= Screen adaptations of plays by Georges Feydeau =

Georges Feydeau, the best-known writer of French farce in the late 19th and early 20th centuries, wrote more than twenty full-length comic plays and twenty one-act ones. Some of these have been adapted for the cinema. Although Feydeau was active well into the era of film he never wrote for the medium, but within two years of his death in 1921 other writers and directors began to take his plays as the basis for films, of which more than twenty have been made, in several countries and languages.

== Films based on Feydeau plays ==
Film title	Based on Feydeau's play	Year	Country	Director
La dama de Chez Maxim's	La Dame de chez Maxim	1923	Italy	Amleto Palermi
Il tacchino	Le Dindon	1925	Italy	Mario Bonnard
Take Care of Amelia	Occupe-toi d'Amélie!	1925	Italy	Telemaco Ruggeri
Un fil à la patte	Un fil à la patte	1925	France	Robert Saidreau
The Queen of Moulin Rouge	La Duchesse des Folies-Bergère	1926	Austria	Robert Wiene
On purge bébé	On purge bébé	1931	France	Jean Renoir
Take Care of Amelie	Occupe-toi d'Amélie!	1932	France	Marguerite Viel and Richard Weisbach
Un fil à la patte	Un fil à la patte	1933	France	Karl Anton
The Girl from Maxim's	La Dame de chez Maxim	1933	UK	Alexander Korda
La dame de chez Maxim's	La Dame de chez Maxim	1933	France	Alexander Korda
Champignol malgré lui	Champignol malgré lui	1933	France	Fred Ellis
L'Hôtel du libre échange	L'Hôtel du libre échange	1934	France	Marc Allégret
Monsieur chasse	Monsieur chasse!	1947	France	Willy Rozier
Keep an Eye on Amelia	Occupe-toi d'Amélie!	1949	France	Claude Autant-Lara
The Girl from Maxim's	La Dame de chez Maxim	1950	France	Marcel Aboulker
The Turkey	Le Dindon	1951	France	Claude Barma
Le Fil à la patte	Un fil à la patte	1955	France	Guy Lefranc
Äktenskapsbrottaren	L'Hôtel du libre échange	1964	Sweden	Hasse Ekman
Hotel Paradiso	L'Hôtel du libre échange	1966	UK	Peter Glenville
A Flea in Her Ear	La Puce à l'oreille	1968	France/US	Jacques Charon
Le P'tit vient vite	Léonie est en avance ou le Mal joli	1972	Canada	Louis-Georges Carrier
Per favore, occupati di Amelia	Occupe-toi d'Amélie!	1981	Italy	Flavio Mogherini
La pulga en la oreja	La Puce à l'oreille	1981	Argentina	Pancho Guerrero
The Art of Breaking Up	Un fil à la patte	2005	France	Michel Deville
A Finada Mãe da Madame	Feu la mère de madame	2016	Brazil	Bernard Attal

== Television adaptations ==
In the 1960s and 1970s the BBC filmed a series of fourteen farces by Feydeau, adapted by Caryl Brahms and Ned Sherrin, under the collective title Ooh La La!. Some were adapted from one-act plays, others from full-length ones. All fourteen starred Patrick Cargill.

Title	Adapted from	Co-starring with Patrick Cargill	Producer	Year	Ref
A Good Night's Sleep	Feu la mère de Madame	Amanda Barrie	Stuart Allen	1968	
All Night Sitting	Tailleur pour dames	Amanda Barrie; Anton Rodgers	Stuart Allen	1968	
A Little Bit to Fall Back On	Les Pavés de l'ours	Amanda Barrie; Jim Dale; Fabia Drake	Stuart Allen	1968	
Above Reproach	C'est une femme du monde	Amanda Barrie; Donald Sinden; Barbara Windsor	Stuart Allen	1968	
Making a Pass	Dormez, je le veux!	Amanda Barrie; Robertson Hare	Stuart Allen	1968	
Before We Were So Rudely Interrupted	Gibier de potence	Amanda Barrie; Anton Rodgers	Stuart Allen	1968	
Call Me Maestro	Amour et piano	Fenella Fielding; Roy Hudd	G. B. Lupino	1968	
Keep an Eye on Amelie	Occupe-toi d'Amélie!	Judi Dench; Bill Fraser	Douglas Argent	1973	
A Pig in a Poke	Chat en poche	Richard Briers; Joan Sims	Douglas Argent	1973	
A-Hunting We Will Go	Monsieur chasse!	Barbara Murray; Tony Britton; Joan Hickson	Douglas Argent	1973	
The Lady from Maxim's	La Dame de chez Maxim	Bernard Cribbins; Barbara Windsor; Betty Marsden	Douglas Argent	1973	
Paying the Piper	Le Dindon	Amanda Barrie; Michael Aldridge; Michael Bates	Douglas Argent	1973	
Caught in the Act	La Puce à l'oreille	Dinah Sheridan; Patricia Routledge; Bernard Bresslaw; Dennis Waterman	Douglas Argent	1973	
Kept on a String	Un Fil à la patte	Freddie Jones; Eleanor Summerfield	Douglas Argent	1973	
