= Je ne trompe pas mon mari! =

Play by Georges Feydeau and René Peter

Des Saugettes, Saint-Franquet and Miss Doty, 1914

Je ne trompe pas mon mari! (I don't cheat on my husband!) is a three-act farce by Georges Feydeau and René Peter. It was Feydeau's last full-length play. Opening in Paris in 1914, it ran for 200 performances. The plot revolves round the love life of a well-known painter, with the other characters in various permutations around him.

== Background and first production ==
By 1914 Feydeau had written, on his own or in collaboration with other playwrights, more than twenty full-length plays, mostly farces (for which he used the alternative French term "vaudevilles"). Several had enjoyed unusually long runs on the Paris stage. What is now one of his most popular plays, La Puce à l'oreille (A Flea in Her Ear), had closed prematurely after 86 performances in 1907, following the sudden death of one of its stars, but its successor, Occupe-toi d'Amélie! (Look After Amélie), ran for 288 performances the following year – considered an excellent run at the time. A younger playwright, René Peter, brought him a script, which Feydeau agreed to rework and prepare for production. The biographer Henry Gidel speculates that the always courteous Feydeau may have felt constrained to revise the original script less drastically than he might have wished.

Feydeau hoped that the cocotte, Bichon, would be played by Armande Cassive whom he had discovered in 1899 for his La Dame de chez Maxim and subsequently moulded into his ideal leading lady, but she was unavailable. Betty Daussmond played the role, and Feydeau admitted that she brought "joie de vivre" to it on "her pretty Columbine lips".

The play opened at the Théâtre de l'Athénée, Paris, on 18 February 1914 and ran until the customary summer closure of the theatres in July, a total of 200 performances.

Sketch of first production, from Le Journal amusant, 1914. The caption reads "Feydeau and Peter don't cheat on their public"

=== Original cast ===
- Saint-Franquet – Lucien Rozenberg
- Des Saugettes – Paul Ardot
- Plantarède – Lucien Cazalis
- Le gérant – M. Cousin
- Tommy – M. Dillon
- Giclefort – M. Papoz
- Bichon – Betty Daussmond
- Micheline – Lucile Nobert
- Miss Doty – Alice Nory
- Mme Giclefort – Virginie Rolland
- Sophie – Rose Grane

== Plot ==
The first act is set in the gardens of a spa resort. The fashionable painter Saint-Franquet is furious at being rebuffed by the virtuous Micheline Plantarède, wife of his closest friend. He picks a quarrel with Des Saugettes, a handsome young man attached to her.

The second act is set in Saint-Franquet's studio in Paris, where the personages coming and going include Bichon, Des Saugettes and Miss Doty. Bichon, a young blonde, is the painter's girlfriend. She is a singer at a café-concert; scantily clad, she rehearses a number. Des Saugettes has become friendly with Saint-Franquet after their quarrel. Miss Doty is a petite American billionairess, who has fallen at first sight for Saint-Franquet and is determined to marry him, despite already having a fiancé, Tommy.

Saint-Franquet quarrels with Bichon, who declares that she has a protector ready to supplant him. He turns out to be Plantarède, Micheline's husband. She, finding her husband is cheating on her, decides to return the favour, and comes in pursuit of Saint-Franquet at the moment when he has just promised Miss Doty to marry her.

In the last act Saint-Franquet and Micheline are together in his bedroom. Bichon, who is worldly-wise and knows how men's minds work, takes matters in hand. Plantarède is persuaded that his wife has not cheated on him, but has merely faked adultery in revenge. The Plantarèdes are reconciled and Saint-Franquet is free to marry his petite American.

== Critical reception ==
Poster for 1920 revival

The play was well received by contemporary critics. Edmond Stoullig wrote in Les Annales du théatre et de la musique, "... everyone will be happy, including the spectators who all laughed madly from one end to the other of these three acts. It is built with a sure hand, a hilarious vaudeville, of extraordinary enthusiasm, of a continuous sparkle of wit, humour and fantasy, a joyful piece, carried to perfection". Le Figaro remarked on "an indisputable, commanding, acknowledged, certified, and irremovable success". When the play was revived in 1916 the reviewer in La Rampe called it "very funny, sparkling in words and situations". The piece has been neglected since Feydeau's death, and his biographer Leonard Pronko writes that it showed signs that the playwright's genius was nearing exhaustion, Gidel comments that the play attempts, not wholly successfully, to combine farce with a satirical depiction of the manners of a small spa town.

== Revivals ==
The play was revived at the Athénée in 1916. Rozenberg and Nobert reprised their original roles, Jacques Louvigny took over the part of Des Saugettes, and Cassive played Bichon, as Feydeau had originally planned. The piece was staged in the French provinces in 1920, in Lyon and in Vichy. Another production was staged in Paris at the Théâtre Antoine in 1923, in which Louvigny switched from his earlier role to play Saint-Franquet, and Arletty played Bichon. Les Archives du spectacle record no subsequent productions.

== Sources ==
- Gidel, Henry (1991). Georges Feydeau (in French). Paris: Flammarion. ISBN 978-2-08-066280-4.
- Pronko, Leonard (1982). Eugene Labiche and Georges Feydeau. London: Macmillan. ISBN 978-0-333-28897-9.
- Meyer, Peter (2003). "Introduction". Feydeau. London: Oberon. ISBN 978-1-84943-993-0.
- Stoullig, Edmond (1909). Les Annales du théâtre et de la musique, 1908. Paris: Ollendorff. OCLC 172996346.

- — (1910). Les Annales du théâtre et de la musique, 1909. Paris: Ollendorff. OCLC 172996346.
- — (1915). Les Annales du théâtre et de la musique, 1914. Paris: Ollendorff. OCLC 172996346.
