= Un fil à la patte =

1894 three-act farce by Georges Feydeau

Act 3: Bois-d'Enghien obtains Bouzin's trousers at the point of a toy gun

Un fil à la patte (Tied by the leg) is a three-act farce by Georges Feydeau. It was first performed in Paris in 1894 and ran for 129 performances. The play has been revived frequently in France, and has been staged in translations in the US and Britain.

The play depicts the frantic efforts of a young man-about-town to break his ties to his mistress as he prepares to marry into the aristocracy.

== Background and first production ==
By the mid-1890s Georges Feydeau had established himself as the leading writer of French farce of his generation. At a time when a run of 100 performances was regarded in Parisian theatres as a success, Feydeau had enjoyed runs of 434 for Champignol malgré lui (1892) and 371 for L'Hôtel du libre échange (1894). Both those plays had been written in collaboration with Maurice Desvallières.

Un fil à la patte opened at the Théâtre du Palais-Royal on 9 January 1894, and ran for 129 performances. The fil or thread of the title is that which metaphorically ties Bois-d'Enghien to Lucette Gauthier, a music-hall star.

=== Original cast ===
Jeanne Cheirel (Lucette) and Perrée Raimond (Bois-d'Enghien)

- Bouzin – Saint-Germain
- General Irrigua – M Milher (Note: Stage name of Ange Édouard Hermil.)
- Bois-d'Enghien – Perrée Raimond
- Lantery – M Luguet
- Chenneviette – Gaston Dubosc
- Fontanet – M Didier
- Antonio – M Garon
- Jean – M Colombet
- Firmin – M Bellot
- Concierge – M Liesse
- A Gentleman – M Parizot
- Émile – M Garnier
- Lucette – Jeanne Cheirel
- Baroness – Mme Franck-Mel
- Viviane – Mme B Doriel
- Marceline – Mme A Bode
- Nini Galant – Mme Mèdal
- Miss Betting – Mme Darville
- A Lady – Élisa Louise Bilhaut
- Servants, Maids, A wedding party

Source: Les Annales du théâtre et de la musique.

== Plot ==
=== Act 1 ===
The scene is the Paris flat of the singer Lucette. Her lover, Fernand de Bois-d'Enghien, is engaged to be married to Viviane, daughter of the Baroness Duverger, but is too cowardly to break the news to Lucette. As the morning continues more characters arrive at the apartment. Bouzin is a notary's clerk who dabbles in song-writing. Although he does not know Lucette, he brings along a song he has written for her. Lucette dismisses his song as stupid and sends him away. A bouquet and ring are delivered for her, with Bouzin's card attached. They have been sent anonymously by Lucette's admirer General Irrigua, a South American exile, but Bouzin has surreptitiously planted his business card in the bouquet. When he returns for his forgotten umbrella, Lucette is more welcoming, sending him back to his flat to retrieve the song. The general enters. He says he will kill anyone who comes between him and Lucette. Bois-d'Enghien tells him Bouzin is her lover. Bouzin returns, the general attacks him, and when it emerges that the bouquet and ring were from the general, Lucette throws Bouzin out.

=== Act 2 ===
Bois-d'Enghien discovered in the wardrobe

At the baroness's town house they are preparing for a party to mark Viviane's engagement. Viviane is not enthused about marrying Bois-d'Enghien: she thinks him a milksop and is attracted only by dashing, disreputable men. Bois-d'Enghien arrives, and is appalled to find that Lucette has been booked to sing at the party. She arrives, and he hides in a wardrobe, where she discovers him. Bois-d'Enghien tries frantically to conceal the news of his engagement, but eventually she discovers it. She takes a thistle from a bouquet and rams it down the back of his neck. Behind a screen he takes off his shirt to remove the thistle, and Lucette removes her dress, makes loud protestations of love, knocks down the screen and embraces him. The uproar brings in the assembled guests who look on, appalled.

=== Act 3 ===
Bois-d'Enghien arrives at his apartment. He is in the middle of changing his clothes when Bouzin arrives. The latter had been the notary's clerk at the betrothal, and is delivering a bill and a copy of the contract. The general arrives, and there is a chase scene before Bois-d'Enghien sends the general in the wrong direction. Lucette arrives and unsuccessfully tries to regain Bois-d'Enghien's affections. She feigns a suicide bid with what turns out to be a toy pistol, and leaves shortly before the general returns. Bois-d'Enghien tells the general he can win Lucette, sending him running after her. Bois-d'Enghien is trapped, trouserless, when the apartment door shuts behind him, leaving him in the corridor. He uses the toy pistol to force Bouzin to surrender his trousers. The concierge comes up the stairs with policemen looking for a man in his underclothes, and Bouzin flees as Viviane arrives, to the surprise of Bois-d'Enghien. Having discovered that Bois-d'Enghien does in fact have the scandalous reputation she desires she is determined to marry him. The baroness soon discovers them and is forced to agree that as Viviane has compromised herself by coming to Bois-d'Enghien's apartment, their marriage is inevitable.

Source: Pronko, Georges Feydeau.

== Reception ==
Act 2: Bois-d'Enghien surprised and shirtless

The authors of Les Annales du théâtre et de la musique said that they despaired of conveying to their readers how funny the piece was. In Le Figaro Henry Fouquier took mild exception to jokes about a minor character's bad breath, but concluded, "I came out dizzy, shaking with laughter" at the sheer youthful delight of the piece, which gave "the rare and charming impression" that the author had enjoyed himself writing the play as much as the audience had enjoyed watching it. The Paris correspondent of the London paper The Era reported that the play "sent us away tipsy with laughing … a side-splitting piece whose broad fun renders criticism superfluous".

== Revivals and adaptations ==
During Feydeau's lifetime the play was revived in Paris, at the Théâtre Antoine in 1911, with Marcel Simon as Bois-d'Enghien, Armande Cassive as Lucette and M Sulhac as Bouzin. It ran for 111 performances. Feydeau's work underwent years of neglect after his death, and Un fil à la patte was not given a major revival in Paris until 1961, when Jacques Charon directed it for the Comédie-Française. Charon played the supporting role of Fontanet, whose bad breath is a trial for all who converse with him; the author's grandson Alain Feydeau alternated in the part with Charon. Micheline Boudet played Lucette, Robert Hirsch Bouzin, and Jean Piat Bois-d'Enghien. (Note: In at least one revival of the production Charon played Bois-d'Enghien.) Since then there have been at least 24 new productions in Paris, Brussels and French provincial cities, under directors including Jérôme Deschamps, Pierre Mondy and Francis Perrin.

=== English versions ===
The first American adaptation of the play was given in 1910, under the title The Lady from Lobster Square. It ran for 24 performances on Broadway. John Mortimer's version, called Cat Among the Pigeons, was first performed in London in 1969. Norman Shapiro's adaptation, called Not By Bed Alone, was published in 1970.

=== Cinema ===
- Un fil à la patte, directed by Robert Saidreau (1925).
- Un fil à la patte, directed by Karl Anton (1933).
- Le Fil à la patte, directed by Guy Lefranc (1955).
- The Art of Breaking Up, directed by Michel Deville (2005).

== Notes, references and sources ==
=== Sources ===
- Noël, Edouard; Edmond Stoullig (1893). Les Annales du théâtre et de la musique, 1892. Paris: Charpentier. OCLC 172996346.
- Noël, Edouard; Edmond Stoullig (1895). Les Annales du théâtre et de la musique, 1894. Paris: Charpentier. OCLC 172996346.
- Noël, Edouard; Edmond Stoullig (1896). Les Annales du théâtre et de la musique, 1895. Paris: Charpentier. OCLC 172996346.
- Pronko, Leonard (1975). Georges Feydeau. New York: Ungar. ISBN 978-0-8044-2700-5.
- Stoullig, Edmond (1897). Les Annales du théâtre et de la musique, 1896. Paris: Ollendorff. OCLC 172996346.
- Stoullig, Edmond (1912). Les Annales du théâtre et de la musique, 1911. Paris: Ollendorff. OCLC 172996346.
