= La Dame de chez Maxim (play) =

Comedy play by Georges Feydeau

La Dame de chez Maxim, 1899

La Dame de chez Maxim (English: The Lady from Maxim's, The Girl from Maxim's) is a three-act farce by Georges Feydeau, first produced in Paris in 1899. It depicts the complications ensuing when a respectable citizen becomes mixed up with a Moulin Rouge dancer after drinking too much champagne at Maxim's restaurant.

In the central role, Feydeau cast a newcomer, Armande Cassive, who became his preferred leading lady, with new roles written with her in mind. The original run of the play, 579 performances, was the longest first run for any of Feydeau's plays. The piece was twice revived in his lifetime and many times since.

== Background and premiere ==
By the late-1890s Georges Feydeau had established himself as the leading writer of vaudeville – known in English-speaking countries as French farce. At a time when a run of 100 performances was regarded in Parisian theatres as a success, Feydeau had enjoyed runs of 434 for Champignol malgré lui (1892) and 371 for L'Hôtel du libre échange (1894), both written in collaboration with Maurice Desvallières, and 282 for Le Dindon (1896).

The leading role of la Môme Crevette in the new piece proved difficult to cast. The character required an actress who could sing, dance the can-can and convey proletarian mischievousness without falling into vulgarity. The director of the theatre suggested Armande Cassive, a singer making a reputation in opérette. Feydeau had seen her in a café-concert and found her impressive. She was temperamental and not a trained actress, but was cast in the role. Feydeau trained her "syllable by syllable, inflection by inflection, move by move" and she became his preferred leading lady, described by the biographer Leonard Pronko as "the unforgettable interpreter of cocottes, housewives and bitter shrews".

La Dame de chez Maxim opened at the Théâtre des Nouveautés on 17 January 1899, and ran for 579 performances.

== Original cast ==
- Petypon – Alexandre Germain
- Général Petypon – Abel Tarride
- Mongicourt – Charles Colombey
- The Duke – Joseph Torin
- Marollier – Eugène Edmond Mangin
- Corignon – Marcel Simon
- Étienne – Landrin
- Street-sweeper – Lauret
- The abbé – Veret
- Chamerot – Royer
- Sauvarel – Émile Milo
- Guérissac – Draquin
- Varlin – Guerchet
- Émile – Miah
- Officer – Féret
- Vidauban – Segus
- Tournoy – Prosper
- La Môme Crevette – Armande Cassive
- Mme Petypon – Rosine Maurel
- Mme Vidauban – De Miramont
- Mme Sauvarel – J. Marsan
- Clémentine – Dalvig
- Duchesse de Valmonté – Chandora
- Mme Ponant – Lamart
- Mme Claux – Marguerite Templey
- Mme Virette – Mylda
- Mme Hautignol – Léo Burkel
- La baronne – Lucy Fleury
- Mme Tournoy – Daguin

Source: Les Archives du spectacle.

== Plot ==
=== Act 1 ===
Petypon and Mongicourt discover la Môme Crevette in Petypon's bed

The scene is the house of Dr Petypon, a respectable middle-aged medical practitioner in Paris. His friend and colleague Dr Mongicourt calls and finds Petypon asleep on the floor. The two of them had been on the town celebrating a professional success and over-indulging at Maxim's. Petypon wakes with a serious hangover and a strange young woman in his bed. She is la Môme Crevette – roughly "the kid shrimp" – star dancer at the Moulin Rouge. His wife, Gabrielle, enters and finds la Môme's dress on the floor and takes it, assuming it is one she had ordered from her dressmaker. Thanks to a ruse by la Môme, Gabrielle leaves without suspecting anything, but la Môme now has no dress in which to leave the house. Mongicourt is sent to buy her one, but while he is away Petypon's uncle, General Petypon, calls. He has never met his nephew's wife, and assumes the young woman in Petypon's bed is Mme Petypon. He invites her, together with his nephew, to his country house. Petypon is aghast, but feels compelled to agree. The general departs, and Mongicourt arrives with a dress for la Môme, who leaves. Gabrielle returns, and her husband tells he is called away from town on a medical case. Two men deliver a new medical contraption for Petypon. It is an "ecstatic chair", designed to put a patient sitting in it into a euphoric trance. Left alone, Gabrielle opens the formal invitation delivered by the general, and concludes that though her husband is unable to join the general's house party, she can and will.

=== Act 2 ===
The local ladies (and the parish priest) attempting to copy la Môme's risqué dance

At the general's château the provincial ladies are shocked but titillated by la Môme's free and easy behaviour and Parisian street-talk, including her catch phrase, "Eh! allez donc, c'est pas mon père!" ("Hey! come on, it's not my father!"), and they attempt to emulate her. Gabrielle arrives; when la Môme is introduced to her as "Madame Petypon" Gabrielle supposes her to be the general's wife. La Môme sings a rude song, which, fortunately, the ladies do not understand – though the general's army colleagues do – and then dances a can-can. Petypon grows increasingly frantic. Corignon, fiancé of the general's niece, arrives. He is an old flame of la Môme, and they run away from the château together. Petypon pleads an urgent medical summons and departs for Paris.

=== Act 3 ===
Back chez Petypon, the mistaken identities proliferate, and characters are frozen in mid-action at crucial moments by sitting in the ecstatic chair. An amorous young duke lusting after "Mme Petypon" (la Môme) finds himself in the embrace of a rampaging Gabrielle. There is a chase scene, much slapping of faces, and a threatened duel is narrowly avoided. Eventually the truth emerges, along with a reasonably plausible innocent explanation of the various impersonations, and everyone ends up with the appropriate partner, including the general and la Môme who go off affectionately together: she tells the assembled company, "Eh! allez donc, c'est pas mon père!".

== Reception ==
The Paris correspondent of the London paper The Era reported, "[Feydeau's] new work is a masterpiece of jocoseness, abounding in frolicsome inventions, and overflowing with witty sayings. Its triumph was prodigious, quite phenomenal. … Seldom have I laughed so heartily in a theatre, and the whole house was with me". In Le Figaro, Henry Fouquier wrote that the laughter shook the auditorium until the audience was begging for mercy. When the play was first revived, in 1910, Les Annales du théâtre et de la musique commented, "The comedy remains insanely funny, and with the unexpected twists and turns the hilarity hardly stops from the rise to the fall of the curtain.

In a 1978 study of Feydeau, Pronko writes, "Scholars and theatermen alike agree that La Dame de chez Maxim is one of the summits of Feydeau's work … it is the embodiment of the vaudeville form at its zenith, the masterpiece of the genre". Pronko comments that in Act 2, Feydeau follows Molière in making fun of provincials who ape what they think are metropolitan ways.

== Revivals and adaptations ==
Georgette Delmarès as la Môme Crevette, Bouffes-Parisiens, 1910

The piece was twice revived in Paris during Feydeau's lifetime. In 1910, at the Bouffes-Parisiens, Georgette Delmarès played la Môme Crevette; in 1913 at the Variétés the part was played by Ève Lavallière, with Félix Galipaux as Petypon. After the First World War, the bawdy plays of the Belle Eppque were now seen as naive, and Feydeau's body of work became neglected for many years; the next production in Paris was in 1965 at the Théâtre du Palais-Royal, directed by Jacques Charon, with Zizi Jeanmaire as la Môme and Pierre Mondy as Petypon. There were several more revivals in the later years of the 20th century, including the Comédie-Française's first production of the piece, directed by Jean-Paul Roussillon in 1981. In the first two decades of the 21st century there were at least 12 major productions in Paris and other French cities.

=== Adaptations ===
The first American adaptation came within a year of the Paris premiere; Charles Frohman presented The Girl from Maxim's on Broadway with a cast led by Josephine Hall. Reviews were mixed: one reported that the play was irresistibly funny without being vulgar, another felt that the adapters had "religiously and industriously sucked all the paint off this once highly colored French farce … disinfected and Americanized". The production lasted for 54 performances. The same adaptation was staged in London in 1902. Reviews were not mixed: they were uniformly terrible; the production closed after three weeks. Frohman tried again in 1913, with a musical version, The Girl from Montmartre, with words by Harry B. Smith and Robert B. Smith and music by Henri Berény; it ran for 72 performances on Broadway.

In October 1977 the National Theatre in London presented an adaptation by John Mortimer, The Lady from Maxim's; it was directed by Christopher Morahan and starred Morag Hood and Stephen Moore. It ran for 70 performances.

=== Film ===
The play has been adapted for the cinema several times, including a silent version in 1923 by Amleto Palermi, two versions directed by Alexander Korda in the 1930s, one in French and one in English, a 1950 film directed by Marcel Aboulker, and a 2020 film of Zabou Breitman's Théâtre de la Porte Saint-Martin production.

== References and sources ==
=== Sources ===
- Gidel, Henry (1991). Georges Feydeau (in French). Paris: Flammarion. ISBN 978-2-08-066280-4.
- Noël, Edouard; Edmond Stoullig (1893). Les Annales du théâtre et de la musique, 1892. Paris: Charpentier. OCLC 172996346.
- Noël, Edouard; Edmond Stoullig (1894). Les Annales du théâtre et de la musique, 1893. Paris: Charpentier. OCLC 172996346.
- Noël, Edouard; Edmond Stoullig (1895). Les Annales du théâtre et de la musique, 1894. Paris: Charpentier. OCLC 172996346.
- Noël, Edouard; Edmond Stoullig (1896). Les Annales du théâtre et de la musique, 1895. Paris: Charpentier. OCLC 172996346.
- Noël, Edouard; Edmond Stoullig (1897). Les Annales du théâtre et de la musique, 1896. Paris: Charpentier. OCLC 172996346.
- Pronko, Leonard (1975). Georges Feydeau. New York: Ungar. ISBN 978-0-8044-2700-5.
- Stoullig, Edmond (1898). Les Annales du théâtre et de la musique, 1897. Paris: Charpentier. OCLC 172996346.
- Stoullig, Edmond (1900). Les Annales du théâtre et de la musique, 1899. Paris: Charpentier. OCLC 172996346.
- Stoullig, Edmond (1911). Les Annales du théâtre et de la musique, 1910. Paris: Charpentier. OCLC 172996346.
