= Alain Feydeau =

French actor, director, and writer

Georges Alain Thierry Feydeau (21 July 1934 – 14 January 2008) was a French actor, director and writer. He was a grandson of the playwright Georges Feydeau, and appeared in several of his grandfather's works, and directed new productions of two of them.

== Life and career ==
Feydeau was born in Boulogne-Billancourt, near Paris, on 21 July 1934, son of Michel Feydeau (1900–1961) and his wife Françoise, née Hoentschel. At the Conservatoire national supérieur d'art dramatique in Paris he won the first prize for comedy in 1958, after which he joined the company of the Comédie-Française, of which he remained a member until 1983. During his time with the company Feydeau was appointed to the rank of Grand Pensionnaire, but was never made a full Sociétaire.

In a stage career lasting nearly fifty years, Feydeau played in a wide range of plays, from French and foreign classics, such as Corneille's Le Menteur, Hugo's Ruy Blas and Schiller's Marie Stuart to 20th-century works by writers including Anouilh, Cocteau, Giraudoux, Sacha Guitry and Marcel Pagnol. Among his more unusual roles was Agatha Christie's Captain Hastings in a stage adaptation of a Poirot story. The dramatist in whose plays he appeared most frequently was Molière – Les Archives du spectacle record 14 Molière productions in which he played between 1958 and 1973.

In his grandfather's plays Feydeau took the roles of Fontanet in Jacques Charon's production of Un fil à la patte (1961 and subsequent revivals), Moricet in his own production of Monsieur chasse! (1969), Pontagnac in Jean Meyer's production of Le Dindon (1970), Ribadier or Thommereux in his own production of Le Système Ribadier (1972), Etienne in Jacques-Henri Duval's production of Occupe-toi d'Amélie (1972), and Dr Finache in Jean-Laurent Cochet's production of La Puce à l'oreille (1978).

On television Feydeau appeared frequently in the long-running series Au théâtre ce soir (At the theatre tonight), taking 21 different roles between 1968 and 1985. He made numerous other television appearances, and did a small amount of work for the cinema. As a writer, Feydeau published two books about the distinguished actress Edwige Feuillère, whom he knew well. He also published some fiction.

Feydeau died in Paris on 14 January 2008, aged 73. He is buried in the Montmartre Cemetery with other family members including the playwright.
