= Feydeau (disambiguation) =

Georges Feydeau (1862–1921) was a French playwright.

Feydeau may also refer to:

== People ==
- Ernest-Aimé Feydeau (1821–1873), French writer, father of Georges
- Jean-Pierre Feydeau (1903–1970), French film director and screenwriter
- Alain Feydeau (1934–2008), French actor, director and writer

== Other uses ==
- Théâtre Feydeau, a theatre completed in 1791 in Paris, France, and its company of performers
