= La dama de Chez Maxim's (1923 film) =

1923 film directed by Amleto Palermi

La dama de Chez Maxim's (or La Dame de Chez Maxim's) is a 1923 Italian silent comedy film directed by Amleto Palermi and starring Carmen Boni, Alfredo Martinelli and Pina Menichelli. It is an adaptation of the 1899 play La Dame de chez Maxim by Georges Feydeau.

== Cast ==
- Carmen Boni
- Alfredo Martinelli
- Pina Menichelli
- Ugo Gracci
- Marcel Lévesque
- Arrigo Marchio

== Production ==
The work is the first film adaptation of a Feydeau play by Palermi, released two years before his screen version of Occupe-toi d'Amélie (1925). It is also, more generally, one of various adaptations of melodrama and vaudeville plays made by the Italian director.

== Reception ==
The film is considered by Charles Ford in his History of Modern Film (1966), to be his best screen adaptation of a theater play. It was the second silent screen adaptation of the play, and in his book about the playwright, Jacques Lorcey found the effort to convey Feydeau's humour without dialogue amusing.

Various commentators noted Menichelli's comedic performance.

== See also ==
- Maxim's
