= Betty Daussmond =

French actress (1873–1957)

- Daussmond by Nadar, 1902 or earlier
- Born: Marguerite Anne Bettina Doneau; 29 July 1873; Sarthe, Pays-de-Loire, France
- Died: 25 September 1957 (aged 84); Paris, Ile-de-France, France
- Occupation: Actress
- Years active: 1910-1953 (film)

Betty Daussmond (29 July 1873 – 25 September 1957), born Marguerite Anne Bettina Doneau, was a French stage and film actress, often associated with comedies and especially with the works of Sacha Guitry.

== Career ==
Daussmond was born in Beaumont-sur-Sarthe, and prepared for a stage career at the conservatory in Nantes.

In 1914 Daussmond played the leading female part in Georges Feydeau's last full-length farce, Je ne trompe pas mon mari!. The author commented that she brought "joie de vivre" to the role on "her pretty Columbine lips". Also in 1914 she appeared in L'habit vert, another French farce, in London. She was featured in the comedy La danseuse éperdue in 1920.

Daussmond acted in works by Sacha Guitry on the London stage, including roles in L'illusioniste (1922), Jacqueline (1922), Comment on ecrit l'histoire (1923), and Le veilleur de nuit (1923). Of her work in Le veilleur de nuit, a Daily Telegraph reviewer wrote, "The audience took her to their hearts, grateful for the many laughs with which she enlivened the evening."

In 1933, she acted in an adaptation of the American play Dinner at Eight in Paris. In 1935 she was again in a Guitry play in London, Mon double et ma Moite, at Daly's Theatre. In 1939 she was in the cast of a radio production of Guitry's Les ruptures. She acted in a play by Armand Salacrou, Si Dieu le voulait, in Paris in 1950.

Daussmond's clothes, including gowns by Lanvin and Maggy Rouff, were photographed, described, and discussed in the fashion press. When her stage costumes violated an exclusive agreement in 1922, the designer Patou sued Daussmond. She endorsed Dentol, a brand of toothpaste, in print advertisements.

== Selected filmography ==
- All for Love (1933)
- A Weak Woman (1933)
- Poliche (1934)
- Three Sailors (1934)
- The New Testament (1936)
- Woman of Malacca (1937)
- Cocoanut (1939)
- Indiscretions (1939)
- White Paws (1949)
- Three Women (1952)
- A Woman's Treasure (1953)
