= Joseph Torin =

French actor (1849–1907)

Torin, c. 1905

Joseph Torin (né Joseph Victorin Schiffer; 9 August 1849 – 18 March 1907), was a French actor of the late 19th and early 20th centuries. He was particularly known for his comic roles in plays by Georges Feydeau, Maurice Hennequin, Georges Duval, Gaston Arman de Caillavet, Robert de Flers and other contemporary playwrights.

== Life and career ==
Torin was born in Chalon-sur-Saône on 9 August 1849. He first acted in an amateur company in Lyon and as a professional he toured in the provinces and abroad in supporting roles in companies headed by Sarah Bernhardt, Gabrielle Réjane, Jeanne Granier, Anna Judic and Jane Hading. In Paris he joined the company of the Théâtre du Gymnase in 1885. He was subsequently a member, in increasingly important roles, of the companies at the Théâtre du Vaudeville, Théâtre de l'Ambigu-Comique and the Théâtre des Nouveautés.

From the early 1890s Torin was cast in prominent roles. Among the plays in which he appeared were Gigolette by Pierre Decourcelle (1893), Brignol et sa fille and Les Maris de Léontine by Alfred Capus (1903), La Douloureuse by Maurice Donnay (1897), Jalouse by Alexandre Bisson (1897) Le Coup de fouet by Maurice Hennequin and Georges Duval (1901), Florette et Patapan and Vous n'avez rien à déclarer? by Hennequin and Pierre Veber (1905 and 1906), Les Sentiers de la vertu and L'Ange du foyer by Gaston Arman de Caillavet and Robert de Flers (1903 and 1905). The playwright with whom he was most associated was Georges Feydeau, appearing in the latter's La Dame de chez Maxim (as the Duke, 1899), La Duchesse des Folies-Bergère (as Chauvel, 1902), La Main passe (as Hubertin, 1904) and La Puce à l'oreille (as Camille, 1907).

Torin, c. 1896

A large man – Le Figaro remarked on "la corpulence de Torin" – he died of congestion of the lungs after an unwisely energetic visit to a gym. In its obituary notice Le Figaro said:

The death of this perfect artist caused a strong emotion in the world of theatre where he was universally esteemed. … Torin was the best of men, the simplest, the most cordial, the most modest. The audience, his comrades, his director, everyone loved him. Authors noted not only his dedication to the roles they entrusted to him, but perhaps even rarer, his complete lack of vanity.

The sudden death of Torin so affected the Parisian theatre-going public that the production in which he had been appearing – La Puce à l'oreille – which had seemed set for a long run, closed prematurely. He was buried in his native Chalon-sur-Saône.

== Sources ==
- Martin, Jules (1901). Nos artistes: annuaire des théâtres et concerts, 1901–1902 (in French). Paris: Ollendorf.
- Stoullig, Edmond (1908). Les Annales du Théâtre et de la Musique, 1897 (in French). Paris: Ollendorf.
