= Alexandre Germain =

French actor

Germain, 1901

Alexandre Germain was the stage name of the French actor Germain Alexandre Poinet (17 June 1847 – 31 November 1938). He created leading comic roles in several of Georges Feydeau's most successful farces.

== Life and career ==
Germain was born in Paris. He made his student debut at the Théâtre-École de la Tour d'Auvergne in 1863 and his professional debut the following year in Zut au berger! at the Théâtre des Folies-Marigny. He was based there until 1869, when he joined the company of the Théâtre Château-d'Eau (1869–1872) and then the Théâtre des Variétés (1872–1890). He took leave of absence from time to time to appear in plays at the Châtelet, Bouffes-Parisiens and the Folies-Dramatiques. He toured in the US and Russia with Anna Judic.

The Bibliothèque nationale de France lists the following as Germain's productions from the later part of his career. Among them are five full-length plays by Georges Feydeau (Champignol malgré lui (title role), L'Hôtel du libre échange (Pinglet), La Dame de chez Maxim) (Petypon), La Puce à l'oreille (Victor-Emmanuel and Poche), and Occupe-toi d'Amélie! (Pochet).

- 1881 – Les mille et une nuits
- 1883 – Fanfreluche
- 1883 – Les pommes d'or
- 1888 – La fille de Madame Angot
- 1890 – Samsonnet
- 1891 – La demoiselle du téléphone
- 1892 – Champignol malgré lui
- 1892 – La bonne de chez Duval
- 1893 – Mon Prince
- 1894 – L'Hôtel du libre échange
- 1898 – Le contrôleur des wagons-lits
- 1899 – La dame de chez Maxim
- 1900 – Les maris de Léontine
- 1901 – Le coup de fouet
- 1902 – La duchesse des Folies-Bergère
- 1904 – La dame du 23
- 1904 – La gueule du loup
- 1905 – Le gigolo
- 1905 – Champignol malgré lui
- 1905 – Florette et Patapon
- 1905 – Dix minutes d'arrêt
- 1906 – La petite Madame Dubois
- 1906 – La dame de chez Maxim (revival)
- 1906 – Le pavé de l'ours
- 1907 – La cabotine
- 1907 – La puce à l'oreille
- 1907 – Vingt jours à l'ombre
- 1908 – Dix minutes d'auto
- 1908 – Occupe-toi d'Amélie
- 1908 – Coralie et Cie
- 1909 – Article 301
- 1909 – Théodore et Cie
- 1909 – Moins cinq
- 1909 – Une grosse affaire
- 1910 – On purge bébé
- 1910 – L'enlèvement des sabines
- 1910 – Noblesse oblige
- 1911 – Et ma soeur?
- 1912 – La présidente
- 1913 – Les deux canards

Germain died in Paris on 31 November 1938, at the age of 91.
