= Armande Cassive =

French actress (1867–1940)

- Born: Louise-Armandine Duval; December 24, 1867; Paris, France
- Died: March 8, 1940 (aged 72); Paris, France
- Occupation: Actress
- Known for: Leading actress in Georges Feydeau's plays

Cassive as Amélie in Occupe-toi d'Amélie, 1908

Louise-Armandine Duval (24 December 1867 – 8 March 1940), known professionally as Armande Cassive, was a French actress.

== Life and career ==
Cassive was born in Paris, and made her early career in Ba-Ta-Clan opérette. In 1891 she played the role of Lisette in Hervé's opéra bouffe Le Petit Faust at the Théâtre de la Porte-Saint-Martin, and was promoted to share the lead role of Marguerite with Jeanne Granier. She moved to the Théâtre de la Gaité, where she replaced Juliette Simon-Girard, in Le Voyage de Suzette. In 1892, she created roles in Le Pays de l'Or noir (The Land of Black Gold) and Le Talisman. During the rest of decade she starred in opéras comiques and opérettes, and in 1899 was cast in a non-musical play, Georges Feydeau's farce La Dame de chez Maxim (The Lady from Maxim's) at the Théâtre des Nouveautés in the role of "la môme Crevette" (roughly translated as "the Shrimp kid"), a famous dancer from the Moulin-Rouge. Les Annales du théâtre et de la musique praised her prettiness, charm, good humour and verve in the role.

After this, Cassive became Feydeau's preferred leading lady. He wrote star roles for her in La Duchesse des Folies-Bergère (1902), La Puce à l'oreille (A Flea in Her Ear, 1907), Feu la mère de Madame (Madame's Late Mother, 1908), Occupe-toi d'Amélie! (Look After Amélie, 1908), Mais n'te promène donc pas toute nue! (But Don't Walk about in the Nude!, 1911) and Je ne trompe pas mon mari! (I Don't Cheat on my Husband, 1914).

One of Cassive's last roles was the pheasant hen in a revival of Edmond Rostand's Chantecler, when the play was revived in 1927.

Cassive died in Paris on 10 March 1940, aged 72.

== References and sources ==
=== Sources ===
- Gidel, Henry (1991). Georges Feydeau (in French). Paris: Flammarion. ISBN 978-2-08-066280-4.
- Stoullig, Edmond (1900). Les Annales du théâtre et de la musique, 1899. Paris: Ollendorff. OCLC 172996346.
