= Woman of Malacca =

1937 film

- Directed by: Marc Allégret
- Written by: Francis de Croisset (novel); Claude-André Puget; Jan Lustig
- Starring: Edwige Feuillère; Pierre Richard-Willm; Betty Daussmond; Jacques Copeau
- Cinematography: Jules Kruger
- Edited by: Yvonne Martin
- Music by: Louis Beydts
- Production companies: Régina Film Compagnie]] La Magie Films
- Distributed by: Tobis Film
- Release date: 1 October 1937
- Running time: 113 minutes
- Country: France
- Language: French

Woman of Malacca (French: La dame de Malacca) is a 1937 French drama film directed by Marc Allégret and starring Edwige Feuillère, Pierre Richard-Willm and Betty Daussmond. It was based on a 1935 novel by the French writer Francis de Croisset. It was a major success on its initial release. It was shot at the Epinay Studios in Paris. The film's sets were designed by the art director Jacques Krauss. A separate German-language version Another World was also made.

== Synopsis ==
A young Englishwoman, Audrey Greenwood, marries an army officer to escape her dreary life as a school teacher. Accompanying her husband out for colonial service in Malacca, she soon grows unhappy with her marriage, and falls in love with a local sultan, Prince Selim.

== Cast ==
- Edwige Feuillère as Audrey Greenwood
- Pierre Richard-Willm as Prince Selim
- Betty Daussmond as Lady Lyndstone
- Jacques Copeau as Lord Brandmore
- Gabrielle Dorziat as Lady Brandmore
- Jean Debucourt as Sir Eric Temple
- Jean Wall as Le major Carter
- Liliane Lesaffre as Lady Johnson
- Ky Duyen as Le japonais
- Foun-Sen as La servante
- William Aguet as Gerald
- Alexandre Mihalesco as Sirdae Raman
- René Bergeron as Le Docteur
- Magdeleine Bérubet as Mademoiselle Tramont
- Charlotte Clasis as Une amie d'Audrey
- Marthe Mellot as La sous-maîtresse de l'institut Tramont
- Robert Ozanne as Un journaliste
- René Fleur as Un journaliste
- Michèle Lahaye as Une dame anglaise
- Colette Proust as Une dame anglaise

== Bibliography ==
- Kennedy-Karpat, Colleen. Rogues, Romance, and Exoticism in French Cinema of the 1930s. Fairleigh Dickinson, 2013.
- Passerini, Luisa, Labanyi, Jo & Diehl, Karen. Europe and Love in Cinema. Intellect Books, 2012.
