= Cocoanut (film) =

- Directed by: Jean Boyer
- Written by: Marcel Achard
- Produced by: Raoul Ploquin
- Starring: Raimu; Marie Bell; Michel Simon
- Cinematography: Walter Pindter
- Music by: Georges Van Parys
- Production company: UFA
- Distributed by: ACE
- Release date: 17 February 1939
- Running time: 80 minutes
- Countries: France; Germany
- Language: French

Cocoanut (French: Noix de coco) is a 1939 French-German comedy drama film adapted by Marcel Achard from his play of the same name. It was directed by Jean Boyer and stars Raimu, Marie Bell and Michel Simon. The film was made by the German studio UFA, and released by its French subsidiary ACE.

The film's art direction was by Max Mellin.

== Cast ==
- Raimu as Loulou Barbentane
- Marie Bell as Caroline
- Michel Simon as Josserand
- Gilbert Gil as Antoine
- Junie Astor as Colette Ventadour
- Gisèle Préville as Nathalie
- Fernand Fabre as Salvador
- Betty Daussmond as Angèle
- Georges Lannes as Lieberkrantz
- Marcel Maupi as Colleville
- Magdeleine Bérubet as Mme Testavin
- Harry-James as Un invité
- Suzet Maïs as Fernande Josserand
- Simone Gauthier
- Claire Gérard as Une invitée

== Bibliography ==
- Crisp, Colin. Genre, Myth and Convention in the French Cinema, 1929-1939. Indiana University Press, 2002.
