= Keep an Eye on Amelia =

1949 film

- Film poster
- Directed by: Claude Autant-Lara
- Written by: Jean Aurenche; Pierre Bost
- Based on: Keep an Eye on Amelia by Georges Feydeau
- Produced by: Pierre Gurgo-Salice; Georges Legrand
- Starring: Danielle Darrieux; Jean Desailly; Grégoire Aslan
- Cinematography: André Bac
- Edited by: Madeleine Gug
- Music by: René Cloërec
- Production company: Lux Film
- Distributed by: Lux Film
- Release date: 16 December 1949
- Running time: 95 minutes
- Countries: France; Italy
- Language: French

Keep an Eye on Amelia (French: Occupe-toi d'Amélie) is a 1949 French-Italian comedy film directed by Claude Autant-Lara and starring Danielle Darrieux and Jean Desailly and Grégoire Aslan. It is based on the 1908 play of the same name by Georges Feydeau, set in Belle Époque Paris. It is one of several of film adaptations to be made of the story.

== Background ==
One reviewer described it as a "lively adaptation of the popular Feydeau farce", "played with verve and charm by Danielle Darrieux", whose character is "an extremely personable young lady of not too difficult virtue". Another critic rated it highly; with a screenplay by Autant-Lara's regular collaborators, Jean Aurenche and Pierre Bost, he saw it as "a tour de force of virtuosity: the old play - about a rising cocotte in the Paris of 1900, who deceives her rich admirer, agrees to a mock marriage ceremony with an engaging rake to help him secure an inheritance, is herself deceived by a genuine ceremony, has the last laugh by signing the register under a false name and goes off to Venice with the young man on a lovers' trip - has been turned practically inside out. It becomes a film within a play, the action starting in a Paris street, moving on to a stage, then to a series of stylised film sets, returning at intervals to the theatre and glimpsing the footlights; and it moves, with unfaltering invention and control, at breakneck speed."

It was entered into the 1949 Cannes Film Festival. It was shot at the Billancourt Studios in Paris. The film's sets were designed by the art director Max Douy who won the decors award at Cannes.

The British Board of Film Censors at first denied a certificate for the UK screening of the film, but with the introduction of a new category 'X' it could then be shown uncut.

== Cast ==
- Danielle Darrieux as Amélie
- Jean Desailly as Marcel
- Louise Conte as Irène
- Julien Carette as Pochet
- André Bervil as Étienne
- Grégoire Aslan as Le prince (as Aslan)
- Roland Armontel as Le général Koschnadieff (as Armontel)
- Victor Guyau as Van Putzeboom
- Charles Dechamps as Le maire
- Marcelle Arnold as La dame en mauve
- Lucienne Granier as Palmyre
- Colette Ripert as Charlotte
- Paul Demange as Moilletu
- Albert Michel as Un spectateur (as Albert-Michel)

== Bibliography ==
- Goble, Alan. The Complete Index to Literary Sources in Film. Walter de Gruyter, 1999.
