= Poliche =

1934 film

- Directed by: Abel Gance
- Written by: Henry Bataille (play); Henri Decoin; Abel Gance
- Produced by: Maurice Orienter
- Starring: Constant Rémy
- Cinematography: Roger Hubert
- Edited by: Lothar Wolff
- Release date: 1934
- Running time: 90 minutes
- Country: France
- Language: French

Poliche [pɔ.liʃ] is a 1934 French drama film directed by Abel Gance.

== Cast ==
- Constant Rémy as Didier Méreuil, called "Poliche"
- Marie Bell as Rosine
- Edith Méra as Mme Laub
- Violaine Barry
- Romain Bouquet as Boudier
- Alexander D'Arcy as Saint-Wast
- Betty Daussmond as Augustine
- Marcel Delaître as Prosper Méreuil
- Pierre Finaly as Laub
- Catherine Fonteney as Louise Méreil
- Marguerite Mahé as L'accordéoniste

== Bibliography ==
- Dayna Oscherwitz & MaryEllen Higgins. The A to Z of French Cinema. Scarecrow Press, 2009.
