= Chat en poche =

Play by Georges Feydeau

Chat en poche is a comedy in three acts by Georges Feydeau which was performed for the first time on the 19 September 1892 at the Théâtre Déjazet. Modern times commentators have remarked that even if this early play was still influenced by Eugène Marin Labiche, this portrayal of a small egoistic Bourgeois society is characteristic of Feydeau.

== Plot summary ==
Pacarel made his wealth in the sugar industry and wants to premiere an opera composed by his daughter, who "rewrote Faust after Gounod". To fulfill this objective, he asks his friend Dufausset who lives in Bordeaux to engage Dujeton, a well known Tenor from the Bordeaux Opera. But instead of Dujeton, it's the son of Dufausset who comes. He is coming in Paris to study the Judiciary in Paris. Pacarel mistakes him for Dujeton and signs a contract with him, leading to a series of misunderstandings.

== Roles ==
- Pacarel
- Dufausset
- Marthe, wife of Pacarel
- Julie, daughter of Pacarel
- Landernau, Physician
- Amandine, wife of Landernau
- Lanoix de Vaux
- Tiburce, valet
- a mute female servant
