= Occupe-toi d'Amélie! =

Play written by Georges Feydeau

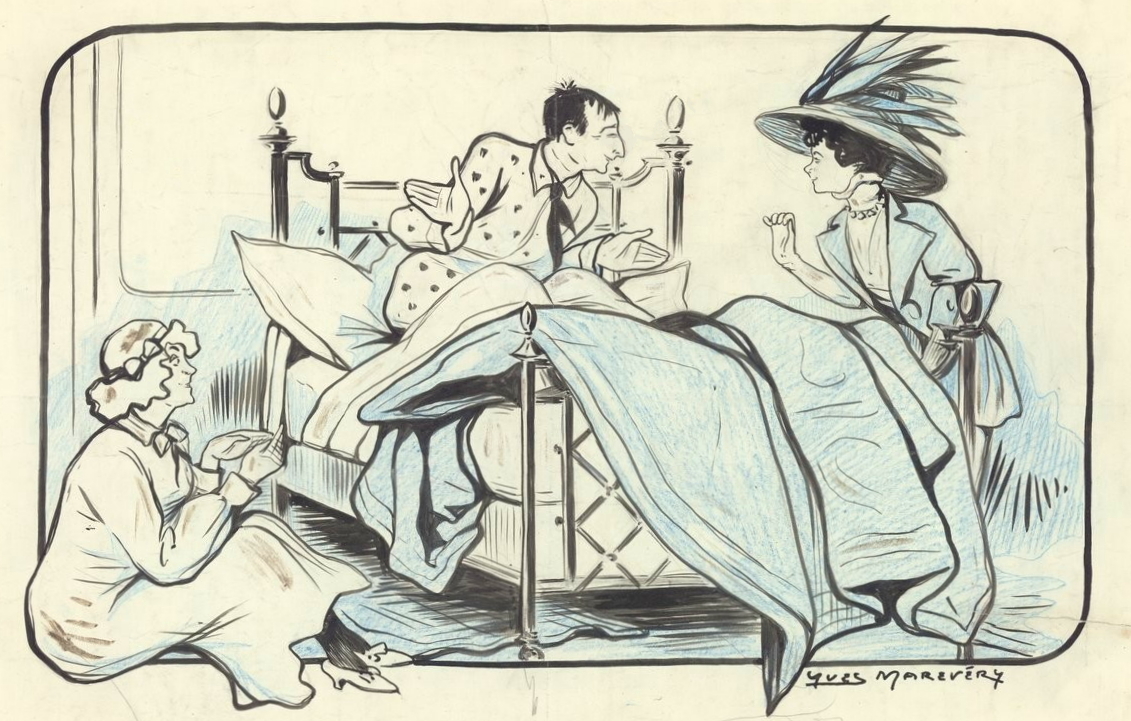
Occupe-toi d'Amélie!, 1908

Occupe-toi d'Amélie is a three-act farce by Georges Feydeau. It was first produced at the Théâtre des Nouveautés, Paris on 15 March 1908, and ran for 288 performances. After the author's death it was neglected until the 1940s, after which it has been frequently revived. The play was adapted into English in 1958 as Look After Lulu!.

== Background and first production ==
Feydeau had been established as Paris's leading writer of farces – which he referred to as "vaudevilles" – since the early 1890s. In 1907 the play he wrote immediately before Occupe-toi d'Amélie, La Puce à l'oreille (A Flea in Her Ear), had been enthusiastically received by critics and public, but the expected long run was curtailed after 86 performances when one of the leading actors died suddenly. Occupe-toi d'Amélie, like its predecessor, is a bedroom farce. It was first produced at the Théâtre des Nouveautés, Paris on 15 March 1908, and ran there for 288 performances. After the run at the Nouveautés the play was revived later in 1909 at the Théâtre Antoine, where it ran for 96 performances.

=== Original cast ===
- Pochet – Alexandre Germain
- Le Prince – Louis Decori
- Marcel Courbois – Marcel Simon
- Étienne – Baron fils
- Van Putzeboum – Ambroise Girier
- Koshnadieff – Landrin
- Adonis – Paul Ardot
- Bibichon – Berthelier
- Le commissaire – Bourgeotte
- Mouilletu – Roger Gaillard
- Le Maire – Grele
- Valcreuse – J. Faure
- Boas – Lamare
- 1st photographer – Mayral
- 2nd photographer – Versy
- Valéry – Raucourt
- Cornette – Prosper
- Mouchemolle – Roux
- Amélie – Armande Cassive
- Irène – Suzanne Carlix
- Charlotte – Gisèle Magnier-Gravier
- Yvonne – J. Morgan
- Palmyre – Ogelly
- Virginie – Jenny Rose
- Gaby – Germaine
- Gismonda – Dorigny
- Pâquerette – Delaunay
- La petite fille – Suzy Leroy

Source: Les Annales du théâtre et de la musique.

== Plot ==
=== Act 1 ===
Amélie Pochet, a high-class cocotte, maintains a Paris apartment in which members of her family also live: her father, a former policeman, and her younger brother Adonis, whom she employs as an attendant. Étienne, Amélie's lover, is obliged to go and do his twenty-eight days compulsory military service at Rouen. Before leaving he asks his old friend Marcel Courbois, in whom he has full confidence, to entertain and watch over his girlfriend. "Look after Amélie", he bids his friend. This suits Marcel, who means to pass Amélie off as his fiancée to fool his godfather Van Putzeboom, who holds a huge sum in trust for him, to be handed over when he marries. A visitor to Paris, the Prince of Palestria, has seen Amélie at the theatre and has lascivious designs on her. He sends his aide-de-camp, General Koschnadieff, to arrange a rendezvous.

=== Act 2 ===
Armande Cassive as Amélie, 1908

In his bachelor flat, Marcel Courbois, wakes up after a night on the tiles. He is surprised to find at the foot of his bed a foreign body, and when he lifts the blanket, he observes with amazement that the body is that of Amélie. They were both so drunk the previous night, after a tour of the bars and cabarets of Montmartre, that they are not sure if they have actually betrayed Étienne, but they acknowledge that appearances are against them. They are surprised by the arrival of the Countess of Premilly, who is Marcel's lover, and was Amélie's employer before the latter exchanged the role of lady's maid for that of a cocotte. Amélie hides under the bed while Marcel and the countess are talking, but soon tired of the cramped position, she escapes by wrapping herself in the bedspread and crawling to Marcel's dressing room. Having tied a string to the bedspread and wound it round one leg of the bed she is able to pull the string so that the bedspread moves across the floor back toward the bed. The countess, believing the furniture haunted, runs away in panic. Étienne arrives, his military service cancelled because of an outbreak of mumps at the army base. He is horrified and angry to discover Amélie in Marcel's bedroom and privately vows revenge.

=== Act 3 ===
Van Putzeboom has insisted on staying to witness the wedding of Marcel and his supposed fiancée, and Étienne takes the opportunity for vengeance on Amélie and Marcel. He tells them that to fool Van Putzeboom into handing over the trust money, Amélie and Marcel should go through a bogus marriage ceremony to be conducted by an actor friend. The ceremony takes place at the town hall, after which Étienne reveals that the "fake" mayor was in fact the genuine one, and that Amélie and Marcel are now married. Amélie and Marcel convince Étienne that they have not deceived him, and after further comings and goings, involving the prince and the police, Amélie and Étienne are found together in circumstances sufficiently compromising for Marcel to obtain a divorce, leaving Amélie and Étienne free to marry. Marcel leaves them together, bidding Étienne, "Look after Amélie".

== Reception ==
The reviewers were enthusiastic; in Le Figaro, Emmanuel Arène said:

M. Georges Feydeau has a spirit, a devil in him which it is impossible to resist. With him, you have to laugh, laugh again, laugh always. We are not deprived of that here. Even those who are not keen on vaudeville or that kind of theatre cannot escape from the contagion. What can one do when surrounded by such unleashed madness and delight?

In Les Annales du théâtre et de la musique Edmond Stoullig wrote:

The mighty, yes the mighty, vaudevillist who is M. Georges Feydeau! Ah, the hilarious farce, first cousin of the Lady from Maxim's, and destined, like her, to attract legions of spectators to the Nouveautés … laughing out loud, as we did without constraint and shamelessly.

== Revivals and adaptations ==
A production directed by Jean-Louis Barrault at the Théâtre Marigny, Paris in 1948, starring his wife Madeleine Renaud marked the start of the revival of interest in Feydeau's plays, neglected since his death in 1921. (Jean Desailly played Marcel and reprised his role in the film version by Claude Autant-Lara the following year.) Since then there have been new productions in Paris and elsewhere by directors including Jacques Charon and Roger Planchon, and actresses including Jacqueline Gauthier and Hélène de Fougerolles as Amélie.

At the suggestion of Barrault and Renaud, Noël Coward adapted the play for Broadway and the West End in 1958, as Look After Lulu!. A 1973 version by Caryl Brahms and Ned Sherrin, entitled Keep an Eye on Amélie, was broadcast by the BBC as part of a French farce series, Ooh La La!, and featured Patrick Cargill as Marcel, Judi Dench as Amélie, Helen Cherry as Irene and Bill Fraser as Pochet. A later English adaptation, by Nicki Frei, was staged in 1996 as Mind Millie for Me.

== References and sources ==
=== Sources ===
- Gidel, Henry (1991). Georges Feydeau (in French). Paris: Flammarion. ISBN 978-2-08-066280-4.
- Hall, Peter (2000) [1993]. Making an Exhibition of Myself (Second ed.). London: Oberon. ISBN 978-1-84002-115-8.
- Mander, Raymond; Joe Mitchenson (2000) [1957]. Theatrical Companion to Coward (second ed.). London: Oberon. ISBN 978-1-84002-054-0.
- Stoullig, Edmond (1909). Les Annales du théâtre et de la musique, 1908 (in French). Paris: Ollendorff. OCLC 172996346.
- Stoullig, Edmond (1910). Les Annales du théâtre et de la musique, 1909 (in French). Paris: Ollendorff. OCLC 172996346.
