= Ernest-Aimé Feydeau =

French writer (1821–1873)

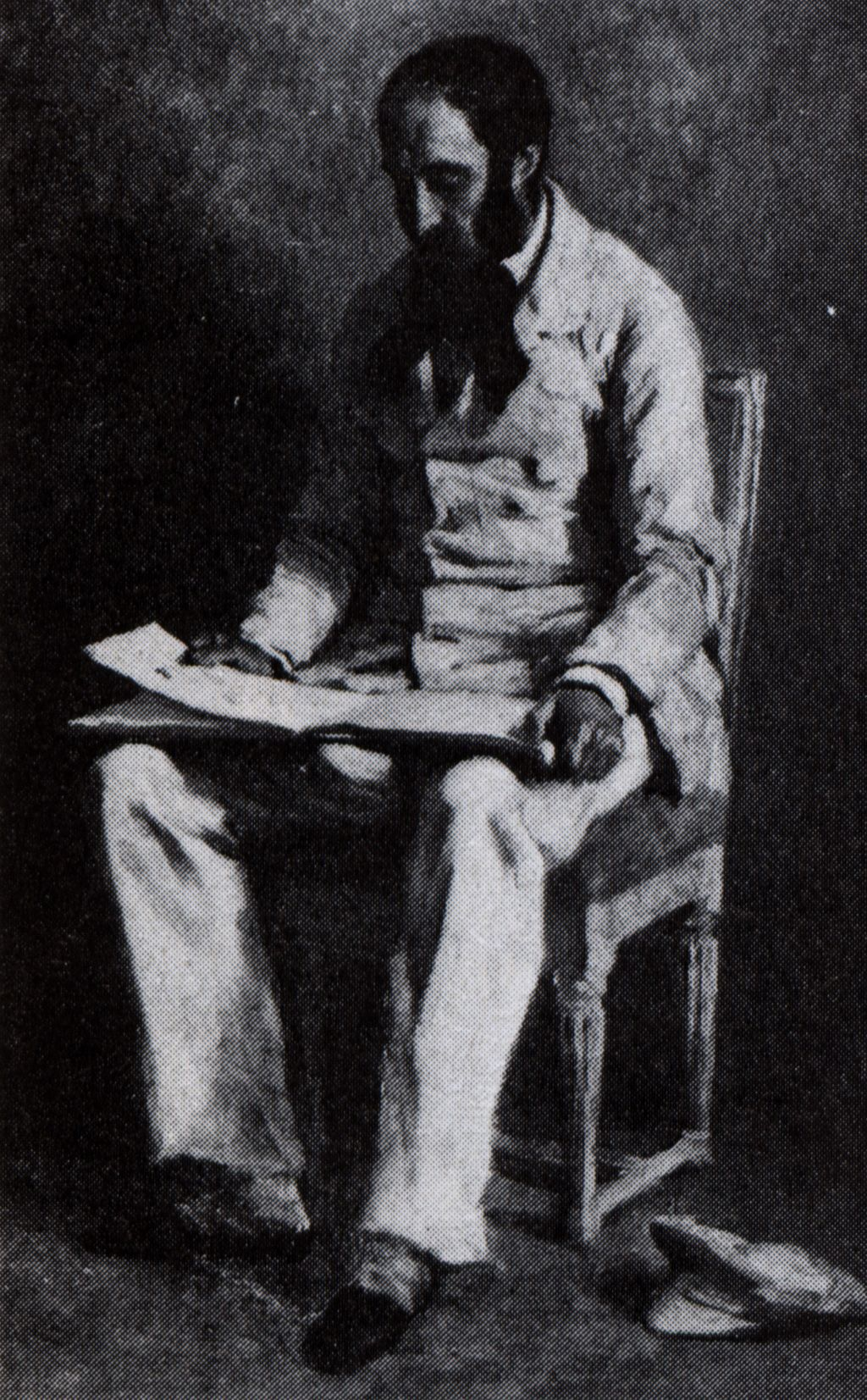
- Ernest-Aimé Feydeau
- Born: 16 March 1821; Paris, France
- Died: 27 October 1873 (aged 52); Paris, France
- Occupation: Writer
- Children: Georges Feydeau

Ernest-Aimé Feydeau (French: [fɛ.do]; 16 March 1821 – 27 October 1873) was a French writer and the father of the comic playwright Georges Feydeau.

== Biography ==
Feydeau was born in Paris, and he began his literary career in 1844, by the publication of a volume of poetry, Les Nationales. Either the partial failure of this literary effort, or his marriage soon afterwards to a daughter of the economist, Blanqui, caused him to devote himself to finance and to archaeology.

He gained a great success with his novel Fanny (1858), a success due chiefly to the cleverness with which it depicted and excused the corrupt manners of a certain portion of French society. In 1861 he married Léocadie Bogaslawa, née Zelewska (1838–1924). This was followed in rapid succession by a series of fictions, similar in character, but wanting the attraction of novelty; none of them enjoyed the same vogue as Fanny. Besides his novels Feydeau wrote several plays, and he is also the author of Histoire générale des usages funèbres et des sépultures des peuples anciens (3 vols., 1857–1861); Le Secret du bonheur (sketches of Algerian life) (2 vols., 1864); and L'Allemagne en 1871 (1872), a clever caricature of German life and manners. He died in Paris.
