= Henry Fouquier =

French journalist and politician (1838–1901)

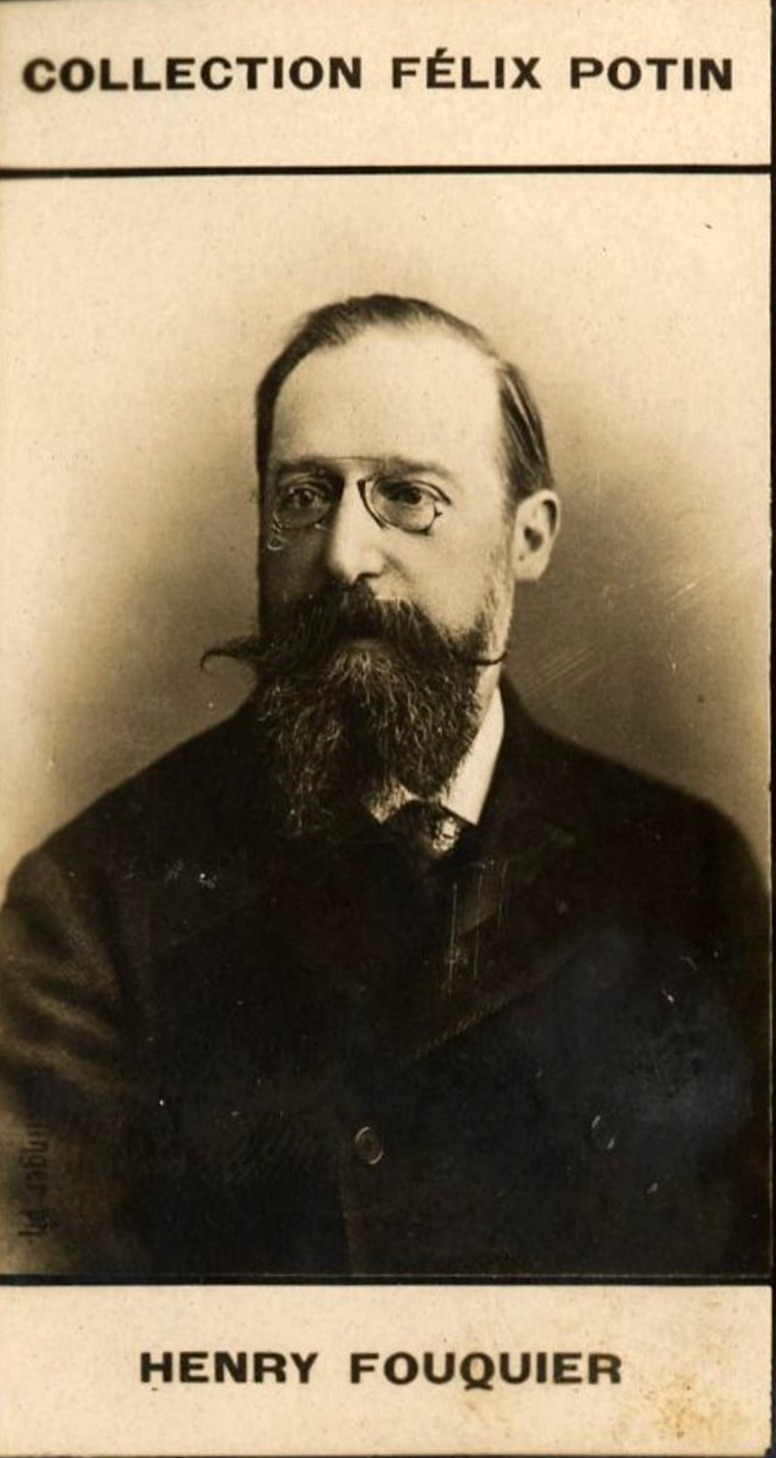
Fouquier in his last years

Jacques François Henry Fouquier (1 September 1838 – 25 December 1901) was a French journalist, writer, playwright and politician. He wrote for many newspapers and journals, often pseudonymously but with a style recognisably his own. He was best known as the chief theatre critic of Le Figaro.

== Life and career ==
=== Early years ===
Henry Fouquier was born in Marseille, the son of a notary. He studied medicine and law but was drawn to neither calling. He was brought up to have liberal values, and throughout his life was proud of his native city, but according to one obituarist the bourgeois spirit of his surroundings did not appeal to him. At the age of 22 he began travelling and spent several years in Spain, Italy and later Switzerland, where he entered the Geneva Institute, studying Italian painting.

Attracted by journalism he moved to Paris in 1861, where he wrote for several newspapers, such as the Courrier du Dimanche, La Presse and L'Avenir National. This was at the height of the Second Empire, under which press freedom was strictly curtailed. Liberal journalists like Fouquier had to exercise great ingenuity and wit to get their views across to their readers without falling foul of the authorities. As a colleague put it, "We did not have licence to say anything, or almost anything, yet we said everything, or almost everything – but it took talent".

In 1867 Fouquier went with Giuseppe Garibaldi's Expedition of the Thousand fighting for Italian Independence. Back in France, following the fall of the Empire in 1870 he was appointed secretary general of the Bouches-du-Rhône département, and then acting prefect, distinguishing himself by his courage in resisting the communard insurrection in Marseille. After this he was appointed director of press affairs at the Ministry of the Interior. He left the post on 24 May 1873, following the fall of Adolphe Thiers's government.

=== Journalist and politician ===
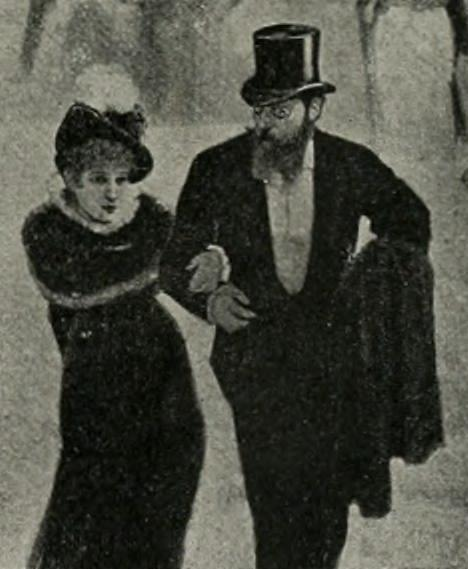
Fouquier with Sarah Bernhardt, 1889

Fouquier returned to journalism in Paris. The English newspaper The Times said of him, "Fouquier again took up his journalist's pen with an activity, an abundance, and a charm which perhaps no other contemporary journalist has been able to equal". His productivity became famous: he wrote for Parisian and provincial papers, in the daily press and in weekly publications. He wrote on all sorts of topics, from politics to philosophy, articles of pure fantasy and on rigorously scientific subjects.

In 1876 Fouquier married Lodzia, known as "Léocadie", Feydeau, widow of Ernest Feydeau and mother of Georges Feydeau. It was a happy marriage and Fouquier and the young Feydeau got on well. Later, when Feydeau was established as a playwright, Fouquier found himself reviewing his stepson's plays from time to time, and despite criticising aspects of some of them he was generally able to agree with his fellow reviewers about their merits.

Despite his success as a journalist, Fouquier hankered after a political career. He unsuccessfully sought election in Bouches-du-Rhône to the Chamber of Deputies, the lower house of the French parliament, but in 1889 he was elected for the Basses-Alpes département. He was a poor orator, made little impression in the Chamber and willingly stood down after one term and returned to journalism. After the death of Auguste Vitu in 1891 he became chief theatre critic of Le Figaro.

Fouquier contributed to a range of publications, often under pen names, including "Spectator" in L'Événement, Le Bien public and the Courrier de France, "Colombine" in Gil Blas and "Nestor" in the Echo de Paris, but as Le Temps put it, ten lines of any of his columns were enough to make it obvious who the author was. He wrote some plays, but they made little impression. The nearest he came to a success as a dramatist was with La Modèle, an 1896 comedy co-written with Georges Bertal. the run of which at the Théâtre de l'Odéon was 38 performances (one of the longer runs at a house where short runs were the norm.) He was twice a candidate for membership of the Académie française, and was professor of journalism at the École libre des sciences politiques.

Fouquier died on Christmas Day 1901 in a nursing home in Neuilly-sur-Seine after a short illness and an unsuccessful operation, and was buried in the Passy Cemetery in Paris.

== Notes, references and sources ==
=== Sources ===
- Gidel, Henry (1991). Georges Feydeau (in French). Paris: Flammarion. ISBN 978-2-08-066280-4.
- Noël, Edouard; Edmond Stoullig (1895). Les Annales du théâtre et de la musique, 1894 (in French). Paris: Charpentier. OCLC 172996346.
- Stoullig, Edmond (1897). Les Annales du théâtre et de la musique, 1896 (in French). Paris: Ollendorff. OCLC 172996346.
