= Henry Gidel =

French biographer

Henry Gidel is a French biographer. He won the Prix Goncourt for his biography of Sacha Guitry. Other subjects have included Charles de Gaulle and his wife, Georges Pompidou and his wife, Georges Feydeau, Jackie Kennedy, Pablo Picasso, Sarah Bernhardt, Coco Chanel and Marie Curie.
