= Leonard Pronko =

American scholar of Japanese theater (1927–2019)

Pronko at Pomona College in 2014

Leonard Cabell Pronko (1927 – November 27, 2019) was an American theatre scholar best known for introducing the Japanese dance drama kabuki to the West, beginning in the 1960s. He was a professor of theatre at Pomona College in Claremont, California, where he taught from 1957 to 2014.

Beginning in 1965, he directed some twenty kabuki productions in English at the college and elsewhere. In 1970, he was the first non-Japanese to study at the Kabuki Training Program at the National Theatre of Japan. He studied kabuki dance with a number of eminent dance teachers both in the U.S. and in Japan. In 1972, Pronko received a Los Angeles Drama Critics Circle Award for his kabuki productions. In 1986, Pronko received the Order of the Sacred Treasure, Third Degree, from the government of Japan in recognition of his achievements in introducing kabuki to the West. In 1997 he received the Association for Theatre in Higher Education Award for Outstanding Teacher of Theatre in Higher Education.

Pronko had written a number of books on western and eastern theatre, including The World of Jean Anouilh, Avant-garde, Theatre East and West and Guide to Japanese Drama. He has translated the plays of Alfonso Sastre, and published monographs on a number of French playwrights. For 27 years, Pronko was Professor of Romance Languages at Pomona College and taught French language and literature and occasionally Spanish and Italian language. He directed plays, including many western classics from Marlowe and Racine to Ibsen and Pirandello.

== Biography ==
Leonard Pronko graduated from Brentwood High School in Brentwood, Missouri in 1945. Leonard Pronko received his B.A. from Drury College in 1947, his M.A. from Washington University in St. Louis and his Ph.D. from Tulane University, all in French and Spanish language and literature. His first teaching position was at Lake Erie College in Painesville, Ohio. Since 1957 he has taught at Pomona College, where he began as an instructor in French, occasionally teaching Spanish and Italian. His interest in theatre manifested itself in numerous courses on French theatre, plays he directed and drama courses he taught from time to time in the Theatre Department. After his first sabbatical, largely spent in Asia, and subsequent study of kabuki at the National Theatre of Japan, he directed many kabuki productions in English. In 1984, Pronko became chair of the Theatre Department, which he served in that capacity for seven years, and he has remained there, teaching courses in dramatic literature, in kabuki performance, and directing plays, including some eighteen kabuki productions, and twenty-four classic western plays from Shakespeare and Schiller to Anouilh and Dürrenmatt. His courses have included surveys of drama, courses in kabuki, in Japanese Theatre, in Asian Theatre and Dance, on Seventeenth Century Drama, Modern European Drama, and an Ibsen seminar. He has offered a number of independent study courses, chiefly on contemporary theatre or on the avant-garde.

Pronko's first article was on the poetic theatre of Lebanese, Georges Schehadé, which led him to an interest in the most recent playwrights writing in French. When, during his frequent visits to Mexico (three months each summer for nine years), he witnessed plays by Eugène Ionesco and Jean Tardieu in the early fifties, he determined to study the new playwrights, and he published his second book (the first having been The World of Jean Anouilh, 1961, University of California Press), Avant-Garde, the Experimental Theatre in France, in 1962 (U.C. Press), one of two early books in English on that important movement. These were followed by short studies of Ionesco and an anthology of French plays. Pronko's sabbatical to Japan and points west of there in 1963-64 brought about a change in his research as he began to study Asian theatres and their impact in the West, resulting in Theatre East and West, 1967, U. of California Press, and Guide to Japanese Drama, 1973, 1984, as well as a number of published translations of kabuki plays to add to his list of translations of several articles by Ionesco and seven or eight plays by Alfonso Sastre. Later books studied the French writers of farce, Georges Feydeau (1975) and Eugène Labiche (1982). He also co-edited Shakespeare East and West, and authored some fifty articles on French theatre, Japanese theatre, and comparative drama.

Pronko lectured widely, chiefly on kabuki, and presented hundreds of lecture-demonstrations including make-up and dance. His performance experience began as a child and continued in graduate school when he participated in plays and sang for two years in the chorus of the New Orleans Opera Company. He studied at the École Dullin and the Sorbonne in Paris, where he has spent a number of years, and he traveled annually to Europe and Japan and to other more exotic climes.

== Awards ==
Pronko won Distinguished Professor Awards twice at Pomona College, a Los Angeles Drama Critics Circle Award in 1972, Drury College Distinguished Alumnus Award in 1980, Tulane University Outstanding Alumnus Award in 1984, the Order of the Sacred Treasure from the Japanese Government, 1986, and the ATHE Award for Outstanding Teacher of Theatre in Higher Education, 1997. In 2006, he was made a Fellow of the College of Fellows of the American Theatre.

== Publications ==
- The World of Jean Anouilh (1961)
- Avant-Garde, the Experimental Theatre in France (1962)
- Eugène Ionesco (1965)
- Theatre East and West (1967)
- Guide to Japanese Drama (1973)
- Georges Feydeau (1975)
- Kabuki Acting Techniques 1: The Body(?)
