= A Flea in Her Ear =

Play written by Georges Feydeau

- Alexandre Germain as Poche, 1907
- Original language: French
- Written by: Georges Feydeau
- Setting: Paris

Premiere
- Date: 1907

A Flea in Her Ear (French: La Puce à l'oreille) is a play by Georges Feydeau written in 1907, at the height of the Belle Époque. The author called it a vaudeville, but in Anglophone countries, where it is the most popular of Feydeau's plays, it is usually described as a farce.

The plot hinges on the central characters having a double: a middle class businessman is indistinguishable from the hall porter of a shady hotel, and the two are persistently mistaken for each other, to the bafflement of both.

== Premiere ==
The play was first performed at the Théâtre des Nouveautés, Paris, on 2 March 1907. Les Annales du théâtre et de la musique said of the play, "It is a piece for which we need to invent a new description: funny, pleasing, comical, frenzied, dizzying, it is all those, and more. The action goes forward with such velocity, explosiveness, prestissimo, from start to finish that the actors and the audience cannot catch their breath for even a second." The play seemed set to rival the run of Feydeau's greatest success, La Dame de chez Maxim (1899, 579 performances) but was cut short by the sudden death of the actor playing Camille Chandebise, and was taken off after 86 performances.

=== Original cast ===
Act 2, 1907: Poche (Germain) being extracted by Lucienne (Suzanne Carlix) from bedroom to lobby as Homenidès de Histangua (Milo de Meyer) shoots at him. Torin, the actor whose sudden death curtailed the run, is sitting on the bed.

- Raymonde Chandebise – Armande Cassive
- Lucienne – Suzanne Carlix
- Olympe – Rosine Maurel
- Eugénie – Jenny Rose
- Antoinette – Mlle Gense
- Victor-Emmanuel Chandebise/Poche – Alexandre Germain
- Camille Chandebise – Joseph Torin
- Finache – Emmanuel Matrat
- Ferraillon – M. Landrin
- Tournel – Marcel Simon
- Homenidès de Histangua – Milo de Meyer
- Etienne – Paul Ardot
- Batistin – Roger Gaillard
- Rugby – M. Roberty

Source: Les Annales du théâtre et de la musique.

== Plot ==
The play is set in Paris at the turn of the 20th century. Raymonde Chandebise, after years of wedded bliss, begins to doubt the fidelity of her husband, Victor Emmanuel, who has suddenly become sexually inactive. Raymonde is unaware that his behaviour is due to a nervous condition. She confides her doubts to her old friend Lucienne, who suggests a trick to test him. They write him a letter, in Lucienne's handwriting, from a fictitious and anonymous admirer, requesting a rendezvous at the Hotel Coq d'Or, an establishment with a dubious reputation, but a large and prominent clientele. Raymonde intends to confront her husband there, and she and Lucienne leave to do so.

When Victor Emmanuel receives the letter he has no interest in such an affair and believes the invitation from the mysterious woman was meant for his best friend Tournel, a handsome bachelor. Unknown to Victor Emmanuel, Tournel has his eye on Raymonde and eagerly exits to make the appointment.

Camille, the young nephew of Victor Emmanuel, is overjoyed to have his speech impediment corrected by a new silver palate from Dr Finache. In celebration, he and the household cook, Antoinette, also hurry to the Hotel Coq d'Or, followed by Etienne, Antoinette's jealous husband. Dr Finache decides to go to the hotel in search of his own afternoon rendezvous.

Poche (left) and Victor-Emmanuel

Victor Emmanuel shows the letter to Lucienne's husband, Carlos Homenides de Histangua, a passionate and violent Spaniard. Carlos recognises Lucienne's handwriting and assumes that she is trying to start an affair with Victor Emmanuel. He runs off to the hotel, vowing to kill her. Victor Emmanuel, hoping to prevent the threatened murder, hurries off in pursuit.

The various characters arrive in search of their goals: Finache for fun; Raymonde for Victor Emmanuel; Tournel for Raymonde; Camille with Antoinette, followed by Etienne; Carlos for Lucienne; and Victor Emmanuel to stop Carlos.

Carlos, attempting to kill his wife, shoots at anything that moves. Victor Emmanuel sees Raymonde talking with Tournel and believes she is unfaithful. Victor Emmanuel is believed to be insane when Poche, an alcoholic porter at the hotel who is a dead ringer for Victor Emmanuel, is mistaken for him. Camille loses his palate, and Tournel tries very hard to seduce Raymonde.

The confusion persists even after all are reunited again at Victor Emmanuel's house. Things begin to clear up when Carlos discovers a rough copy of the letter written by Lucienne on Raymonde's desk, this one in Raymonde's handwriting. The owner of the hotel comes by to return an article left behind by a member of the household and clears up the confusion between his porter and Victor Emmanuel. Finally, Raymonde tells Victor Emmanuel the cause of her suspicions, and he assures her that he will put an end to her doubts—tonight.

== Performance history ==
The first revival, forty-five years after the first production, was at the Théâtre Montparnasse, Paris, on 14 November 1952, directed by Georges Vitaly, with Pierre Mondy in the dual role of Victor-Emmanuel and Poche. The play was revived at Les Célestins, Théâtre de Lyon in 1953 in Vitaly's production, and again in 1968, directed by Jacques Charon. The play was admitted to the repertoire of the Comédie-Française in Paris in December 1978, directed by Jean-Laurent Cochet, with Jean Le Poulain in the lead. It has subsequently been produced at least fifteen times in Paris and other French cities.

Although La Dame de chez Maxim remains the favourite with French audiences, in English-speaking countries A Flea in Her Ear has become the most popular of Feydeau's plays. In Britain a lightly bowdlerised adaptation called You Never Know Y'know played at the Criterion Theatre, London, in 1918, and ran for 351 performances. In 1966 John Mortimer translated the play for the National Theatre, at the Old Vic. The production was directed by Charon and starred Albert Finney. Mortimer's translation has twice been restaged at the same theatre, first in an unsuccessful production by Richard Jones, starring Jim Broadbent, in 1989, and in 2010–11 in a successful one by Richard Eyre, starring Tom Hollander.

In Australia the play was presented in Melbourne in 1967 by the Union Theatre Repertory Company. The Sydney Theatre Company presented the play in 2016 at the Sydney Opera House Drama Theatre in a new adaptation by Andrew Upton. In the US the play was given on Broadway in October 1969, in a production by Gower Champion, with Robert Gerringer as Victor-Emmanuel and Poche. A new adaptation by David Ives was commissioned by the Chicago Shakespeare Theater and first performed on 10 March 2006.

In Serbia a production of the play (as Buba u uhu) opened at the Teatar Bojan Stupica, Belgrade, in June 1971 and, at May 2016, had been running continuously ever since. At 1,700 performances this was the longest theatrical run in the country's history. As "Ψύλλοι στ' αυτιά" (Psili St' Aftia), the play was premiered in Greece in 1976, directed by Dinos Iliopoulos, and has been revived in productions by Minos Volanakis (1984 and 1998), George Kimoulis (2006) and Yannis Kakleas (2013).

=== Television ===
Mondy's portrayal of Chandebise/Poche was captured in a 1956 French television production directed by Stellio Lorenzi, alongside Albert Rémy (Camille), Alfred Adam (Finache), Robert Manuel (de Histangua), Louis de Funès (Ferraillon), Pascal Mazzotti (Étienne), Marthe Mercadier (Raymonde), and Suzanne Dantès (Olympe), released on DVD in 2008. The 1966 National Theatre production was televised by the BBC in 1967. By this time Finney had left the cast and the dual lead role was taken by Robert Lang.

=== Film ===
John Mortimer wrote the screenplay for a 1968 20th Century Fox feature film directed by Jacques Charon. The cast included Rex Harrison, Rosemary Harris, Louis Jourdan, and Rachel Roberts.

== Sources ==
- Gaye, Freda, ed. (1967). Who's Who in the Theatre (fourteenth ed.). London: Sir Isaac Pitman and Sons. OCLC 5997224.
- Gidel, Henry (1991). Georges Feydeau (in French). Paris: Flammarion. ISBN 978-2-08-066280-4.
- Hacht, Anne Marie; Dwayne D. Hayes (2009). Gale Contextual Encyclopedia of World Literature, D–J. Detroit: Gale. ISBN 978-1-4144-3135-2.
- Pronko, Leonard Cabell (1975). Georges Feydeau. New York: Ungar. ISBN 978-0-8044-2700-5.
- Stoullig, Edmond (1908). Les Annales du théâtre et de la musique, 1907 (in French). Paris: Ollendorf. OCLC 762340801.
