= Champignol malgré lui =

French farce

Poster for original production, 1892

Champignol malgré lui (Champignol despite himself) is a farce in three acts, by Georges Feydeau and Maurice Desvallières. It was first performed in Paris in 1892–93, and ran for 434 performances.

The play depicts the complications arising when one man is obliged by circumstances to do military service for another, while the latter, unaware, is doing military service on his own account, under the same name.

== Background and first production ==
In 1886 the 24-year-old Feydeau had a great success with his first full-length play, Tailleur pour dames (Ladies' Tailor), but his next five plays had been failures or very modest successes. After a period of studying the works of the earlier comic masters of the 19th century he wrote two new plays in 1892: Monsieur chasse! (Monsieur is hunting) and Champignol malgré lui – the latter in collaboration with Maurice Desvallières. The management of the Théâtre du Palais-Royal accepted Monsieur chasse! for production, but rejected Champignol malgré lui as too far-fetched and implausible to convince an audience. Feydeau's old friend, Henri Micheau, the owner of the Théâtre des Nouveautés, insisted on seeing the rejected script and immediately recognised it as a potential winner. His judgment was vindicated by the runs achieved by the two plays: Monsieur chasse! had a good run of 144 performances, but Champignol malgré lui had an exceptional run for its day: 434 performances, at a time when a run of more than 100 performances was rated as a success for a Parisian theatre. The play opened at the Nouveautés on 5 November 1892.

== Original cast ==
- Champignol – Alexandre Germain
- Saint Florimond – M. Guy
- Captain Camaret – M. Tarride
- Célestin – M. Clerget
- Charnel – M. Polin
- Ledoux – M. Poudrier
- Fourrageot – Mr Lauret
- Singleton – M. Samson
- Grosbond – M. Calvin, fils
- Le Prince de Valence – M. Rablet
- La Fauchette – M. Cave
- Belouette – M. Sarborg
- Badin – M. Boniface
- Lavalanche – M. Girault
- Jérôme – M. Prosper
- Brigadier – M. Petibon
- Perruquier – M. Ragot
- Joseph – M. Leroy
- Pinçon – M. Aunoble
- Rouche – M. Destrem
- Angèle – Jane Pierny
- Charlotte – Mme Netty
- Mauricette – Mme Narlay
- Adrienne – Mme Aumont

Source: Les Annales du théâtre et de la musique.

== Synopsis ==
Act I: St Florimond, mistaken for Champignol, is arrested

A prominent young painter called Champignol is away from home, and during his absence his attractive wife imprudently flirts with a young flâneur called St Florimond. She intends nothing more than the most innocent flirtation; the pair go to spend a day at Fontainebleau, where during the excursion they meet her uncle, Charnel, and his daughter, and her husband, Singleton. These people have not met Angèle's husband, and in the confusion of the moment she introduces St Florimond to them as M. Champignol.

Angèle, irritated with herself for this blunder, immediately takes the train for Paris, leaving St Florimond crestfallen. He visits her but Madame Champignol makes it plain she does not wish to be further acquainted with him. She is imprudent enough to allow him to give her a farewell kiss on the cheek. They are at the front door when this takes place, and at that moment there arrives Charlotte, a new servant from the country, who assumes St Florimond is Champignol. Angèle does not attempt to undeceive Charlotte, who displays her zeal by bringing St Florimond her master's dressing-gown. While he is thus attired, the Charnels and Singletons arrive, and are delighted to renew their acquaintance with the supposed Champignol. The next arrival is a military man, Captain Camaret, who wants his daughter's portrait painted, and St Florimond feels he has to accept, as any hesitation would compromise Angèle.

It now turns out that Champignol, being away, has failed to respond to a summons to a fortnight's compulsory military service, and gendarmes arrive to enforce it. The servant girl tells them St Florimond is her master, he is taken away to join the regiment at Clermont. As soon as he has been removed, Champignol returns. His valet hands him the summons which had arrived in his absence, and he hastens to comply.

At the barracks the real and the false Champignols are mistaken at every moment for each other. St Florimond still wears his hair long, Captain Camaret tells the adjutant to have it cut. The latter transmits the order to the corporal, who informs the real Champignol that he must submit himself to the barber. He is duly cropped, but Camaret again meets St Florimond, and perceiving that his tresses remain luxuriant assumes that his orders have been neglected. He reprimands the adjutant, the order goes down the command chain and Champignol is subjected to the scissors once more. By this point his head is "shaved as white as a billiard ball". Further mistakes of identity follow. Angèle arrives, and explains to her husband that tired of St Florimond's advances she let him be removed by the gendarmes. St Florimond is obliged to continue to do Champignol's two weeks of service, while the real Champignol makes matters up with his wife. As the curtain falls Camaret orders the false Champignol to get his hair cut.

Source: The Era.

== Critical reception ==
When the play opened in November 1892 one critic wrote of:

... a vaudeville so extremely bright and joyous, and at the same time so irreproachable in its atmosphere, that it obtained an extraordinary success by reason of a kind of mad gaiety which characterized it. ... I have never seen an audience give itself up more completely or continuously to unbridled hilarity.

Another critic said that it had been years since he heard such laughter in a Paris theatre – "I could return to it again and again with pleasure". He predicted that the piece "will have an interminable run".

== Adaptations ==
An English version of the play, called The Other Fellow opened in London in September 1893 and ran for three months. In the same year an American adaptation, The Other Man, opened at the New National Theatre, Washington.

== References and sources ==
=== Sources ===
- Noël, Edouard; Edmond Stoullig (1893). Les Annales du théâtre et de la musique, 1892. Paris: Charpentier. OCLC 172996346.
- Noël, Edouard; Edmond Stoullig (1894). Les Annales du théâtre et de la musique, 1893. Paris: Charpentier. OCLC 172996346.
