= Georges Feydeau =

French playwright (1862–1921)

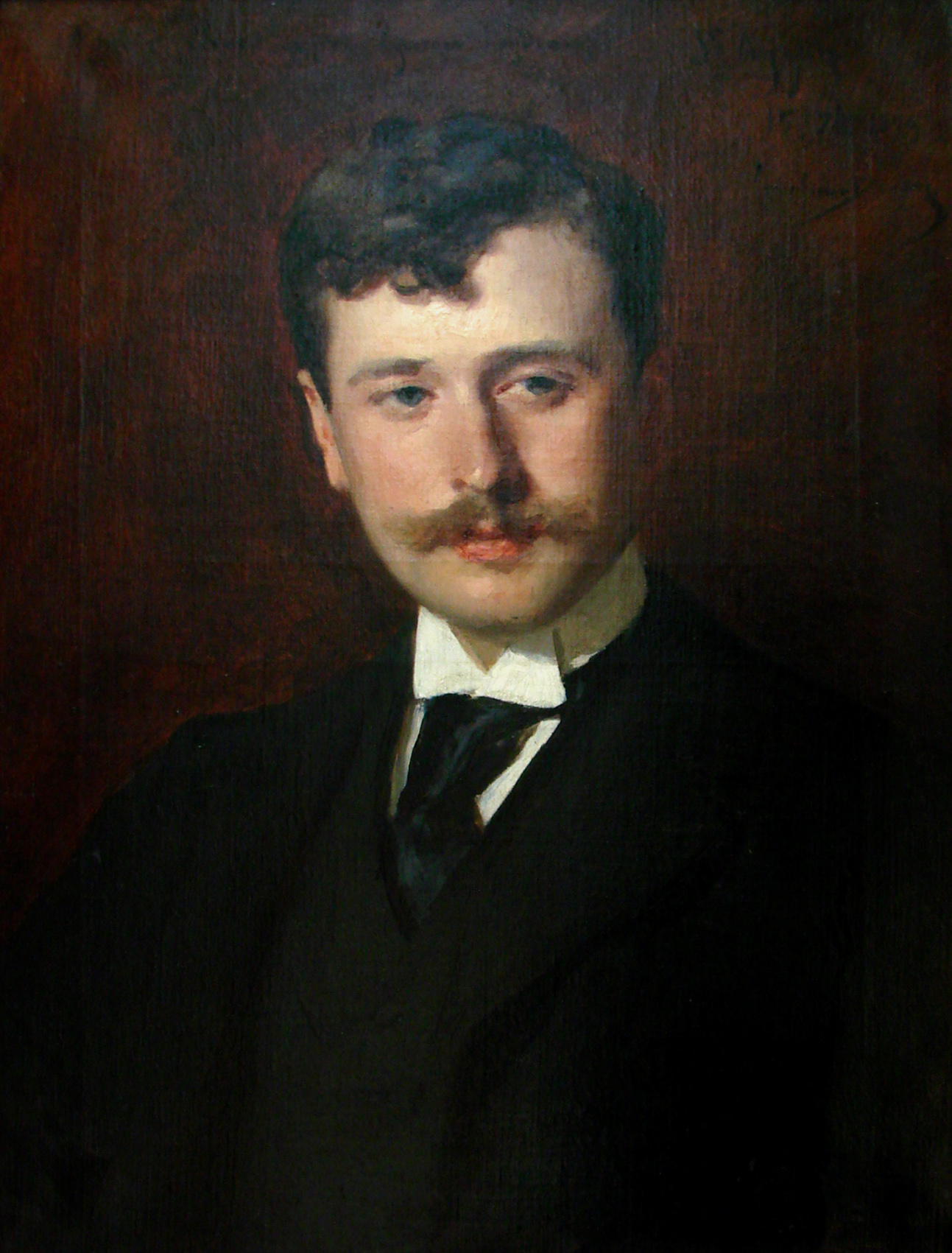
Feydeau in 1899, painted by his father-in-law, Carolus-Duran

Georges-Léon-Jules-Marie Feydeau (Note: Some sources include the hyphens in Feydeau's given names; others omit them.) (French: [ʒɔʁʒ fɛ.do]; 8 December 1862 – 5 June 1921) was a French playwright of the Belle Époque era, remembered for his farces, written between 1886 and 1914.

Feydeau was born in Paris to middle-class parents and raised in an artistic and literary environment. From an early age he was fascinated by the theatre, and as a child he wrote plays and organised his schoolfellows into a drama group. In his teens he wrote comic monologues and moved on to writing longer plays. His first full-length comedy, Tailleur pour dames ('Ladies' tailor'), was well received, but was followed by a string of comparative failures. He gave up writing for a time in the early 1890s and studied the methods of earlier masters of French comedy, particularly Eugène Labiche, Alfred Hennequin and Henri Meilhac. With his technique honed, and sometimes in collaboration with a co-author, he wrote seventeen full-length plays between 1892 and 1914, many of which have become staples of the theatrical repertoire in France and abroad. They include L'Hôtel du libre échange ('The Free Exchange Hotel', 1894), La Dame de chez Maxim ('The lady from Maxim's', 1899), La Puce à l'oreille ('A flea in her ear', 1907) and Occupe-toi d'Amélie! ('Look after Amélie', 1908).

The plays of Feydeau are marked by closely observed characters, with whom his audiences could identify, plunged into fast-moving comic plots of mistaken identity, attempted adultery, split-second timing and a precariously happy ending. After the great success they enjoyed in his lifetime they were neglected after his death, until the 1940s and 1950s, when productions by Jean-Louis Barrault and the Comédie-Française led a revival of interest in his works, at first in Paris and subsequently worldwide.

Feydeau's personal life was marred by depression, unsuccessful gambling and divorce. In 1919 his mental condition deteriorated sharply and he spent his final two years in a sanatorium at Rueil (now Rueil-Malmaison), near Paris. He died there in 1921 at the age of fifty-eight.

== Life and career ==
=== Early years ===
Feydeau was born at his parents' house in the Rue de Clichy, Paris, on 8 December 1862. His father, Ernest-Aimé Feydeau, was a financier and a moderately well-known writer, whose first novel Fanny (1858) was a succès de scandale and earned him some notoriety. It was condemned from the pulpit by the Archbishop of Paris, and consequently sold in large numbers and had to be reprinted; Ernest dedicated the new edition to the archbishop.

Feydeau's parents, Léocadie and Ernest

Feydeau's mother was Lodzia Bogaslawa, née Zelewska, known as "Léocadie". When she married Ernest Feydeau in 1861, he was a forty-year-old childless widower and she was twenty-two. She was a famous beauty, and rumours spread that she was the mistress of the Duc de Morny or even the Emperor Napoleon III and that one of them was the father of Georges, her first child. (Note: The Feydeaus had a second child, a daughter, Diane-Valentine, born in 1866.) In later life Léocadie commented, "How can anyone be stupid enough to believe that a boy as intelligent as Georges is the son of that idiotic emperor!" (Note: "Comment peut-on être assez bête pour croire qu'un garçon aussi intelligent que Georges est le fils de cet empereur idiot!") She was more equivocal about her relationship with the duke, and Georges later said that people could think Morny his father if they wanted to. (Note: "Morny? Soit! Si vous y tenez.")

Ernest was a friend of Gustave Flaubert, Théophile Gautier and Alexandre Dumas fils, and Feydeau grew up in a literary and artistic environment. After being taken to the theatre at the age of six or seven he was so enthusiastic that he started to write a play of his own. His father, impressed, told the family's governess to let the boy off tuition that day. Feydeau later said that laziness made him a playwright, once he found he could escape lessons by writing plays. He sought out Henri Meilhac, one of the leading dramatists in Paris, and showed him his latest effort. He recalled Meilhac as saying, "My boy, your play is stupid, but it is theatrical. You will be a man of the theatre". (Note: Mon fils, ta pièce est stupide, mais elle est scénique. Tu seras un homme de théâtre.)

After the outbreak of the Franco-Prussian War in 1870 the family left Paris for Boulogne-sur-Mer. They returned briefly to Paris in March 1871 and then moved to the spa town of Bad Homburg so that Ernest, whose health was failing, could take the cure. (Note: Bad Homburg was under Prussian rule, but Ernest received permission from the Parisian authorities to go there for the sake of his health.) Soon after their return to Paris in October 1871 the nine-year-old Feydeau, who had so far received only private tuition, was sent to a boarding school. As a pupil he was generally indolent, but devoted time and energy to organising an amateur dramatic group and performing. In October 1873 Ernest died and in 1876 Léocadie remarried. Her second husband, nearer her own age than Ernest, was a prominent liberal journalist, Henry Fouquier (1838–1901), with whom Feydeau got on well. In 1879 Feydeau completed his formal education at the Lycée Saint-Louis, and was engaged as a clerk in a law firm. Still stage-struck, he began writing again. Comic monologues were fashionable in society, and he wrote La Petite révoltée (The rebellious young lady), a humorous monologue in verse, of about seven minutes' duration, which attracted favourable attention and was taken up by the publisher Ollendorff.

=== 1880s ===
Poster for 1887 revival of Tailleur pour dames

The first of Feydeau's plays to be staged was a one-act two-hander called Par la fenêtre (Through the window) presented by the Cercle des arts intimes, an amateur society, in June 1882. In his biography of Feydeau Henry Gidel comments that it was not a representative audience, being composed of friends of society members, but it was nonetheless a test of a sort, and the play was enthusiastically received. The typical Feydeau characters and plot were already in evidence: a shy husband, a domineering wife, mistaken identities, confusion and a happy ending. The first professional presentation of a Feydeau play was in January 1883, when Amour et piano was staged at the Théâtre de l'Athénée. It depicts the confusion arising when a young lady receives a young gentleman who she thinks is her new piano teacher; he has come to the wrong house and believes he is calling on a glamorous cocotte. Le Figaro called it "a very witty fantasy, very agreeably interpreted".

After completing his compulsory military service (1883–84) Feydeau was appointed secrétaire général to the Théâtre de la Renaissance, under the management of his friend Fernand Samuel. In that capacity he successfully pressed for the premiere of Henry Becque's La Parisienne (1885), later recognised as one of the masterpieces of French naturalist theatre. In December 1886 the Renaissance presented a three-act comédie by Feydeau, Tailleur pour dames (Ladies' tailor). Les Annales du théâtre et de la musique thought the play insubstantial, but, it enthused, "what gaiety in the dialogue, what good humour, what pleasing words, what fun in this childishness, what unforeseen things in this madness, what comic invention in this imbroglio, which obtained the most outright success one could wish to a beginner!" The critic of Le Figaro said that the piece was not a comedy at all in the conventional sense of the word:

It doesn't look like anything and it looks like everything. It's made of everything, and it's made of nothing. And it is comic, it is funny! I laughed at it from ten o'clock to midnight. I laughed about it throughout the journey from the theatre to Le Figaro. And I am still laughing about it.

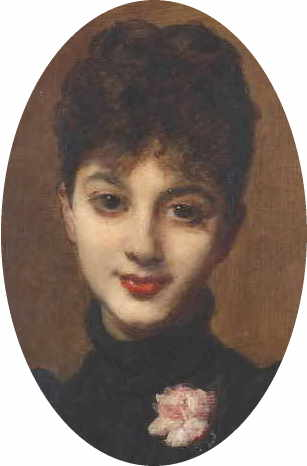
Marie-Anne Carolus-Duran, who married Feydeau in 1889

The critic Jules Prével correctly predicted that the young author would struggle to repeat this early triumph: it was not until 1892 that Feydeau had another success to match Tailleur pour dames. He had a series of poor or mediocre runs in the late 1880s with La Lycéenne (a "vaudeville-opérette" with music by Gaston Serpette, 1887), Chat en poche (1888), Les Fiancés de Loches (1888 co-written with Maurice Desvallières), and L'Affaire Edouard (1889). (Note: Respectively the titles translate into English as The high school girl, A pig in a poke, The betrothed of Loches and The Edouard affair.)

In 1889 Feydeau married Marie-Anne, the daughter of Carolus-Duran, a prosperous portrait painter. The couple had four children, born between 1890 and 1903. (Note: The four children were Germaine (1890–1941), who married the playwright Louis Verneuil; Jacques (1892–1970); Michel (1900–1961), father of the actor Alain Feydeau; and Jean-Pierre (1903–1970), a film director.) The marriage was ideal to Feydeau in several ways. It was a genuine love-match (though it later went awry); he was an ardent amateur painter, and his father-in-law gave him lessons; and marriage into a well-to-do family relieved Feydeau of some of the financial problems arising from his succession of theatrical failures and heavy losses on the stock exchange.

=== 1890s ===
In 1890 Feydeau took a break from writing and made a study of the works of the leading comic playwrights, particularly Eugène Labiche, Alfred Hennequin and Meilhac. He benefited from his study, and in 1891 wrote two plays that restored his reputation and fortune. He submitted them both to the management of the Théâtre du Palais-Royal. They agreed to stage one of them, Monsieur chasse!, but turned down the second, Champignol malgré lui (another collaboration with Desvallières) as too unbelievable for an audience to accept. After receiving this news from the Palais-Royal, Feydeau met an old friend, Henri Micheau, the owner of the Théâtre des Nouveautés, who insisted on seeing the rejected script and immediately recognised it as a potential winner. Meyer writes, "He was right. Monsieur chasse! was a success, but Champignol was a triumph". When the play opened in November 1892 one critic wrote of:

Feydeau in London: Alfred Maltby and Ellis Jeffreys in His Little Dodge (1896)

… a vaudeville so extremely bright and joyous, and at the same time so irreproachable in its atmosphere, that it obtained an extraordinary success by reason of a kind of mad gaiety which characterized it. ... I have never seen an audience give itself up more completely or continuously to unbridled hilarity.

Another critic said that it had been years since he heard such laughter in a Paris theatre – "I could return to it again and again with pleasure". He predicted that the piece "will have an interminable run", and it ran far into the following year for a total of 434 performances. An English version of the play, called The Other Fellow opened in London in September 1893 and ran for three months. Feydeau's next play, Le Système Ribadier (The Ribadier System, 1892), had a fair run in Paris and was successfully produced in Berlin, and subsequently (under the title His Little Dodge) in London and New York.

In 1894 Feydeau collaborated with Desvallières on Le Ruban (The ribbon), a comedy about a man desperately manoeuvring for appointment to the Légion d'honneur. At the same time, after a certain amount of similar manoeuvring on his own account, Feydeau was appointed to the legion, at the early age of thirty-two, joining a small élite of French playwrights to receive the honour, including Dumas, Meilhac, Ludovic Halévy, Victorien Sardou and Becque. (Note: Appointed as chevalier of the Legion in 1895, Feydeau was promoted to officier in 1912.)

La Dame de chez Maxim, 1899

Le Ruban ran at the Théâtre de l'Odéon for 45 performances. Feydeau and Desvallières returned to winning form in the same year with L'Hôtel du libre échange (The Free Exchange Hotel). The Annales du théâtre et de la musique, noting that the laughter reverberated inside and out of the auditorium, said that a reviewer could only laugh and applaud rather than criticise. Another critic, predicting a long run, wrote that he and his colleagues would not be needed at the Nouveautés in their professional capacities for a year or so, but would know where to come if they wanted to laugh. The play ran for 371 performances. An English adaptation, The Gay Parisians, was staged in New York in September 1895, and ran for nearly 150 performances; a London version, A Night in Paris, opened in April 1896 and outran the Parisian original, with a total of 531 performances.

During the rest of the 1890s there were two more Feydeau plays, both highly successful. Le Dindon (literally "Turkey" but in French usage signifying "Dupe" or "Fall guy") ran for 275 performances at the Palais-Royale in 1896–97, and at the end of the decade Feydeau had the best run of his career with La Dame de chez Maxim, which played at the Nouveautés from January 1899 to November 1900, a total of 579 performances. The author was used to working with and writing for established farceurs such as Alexandre Germain, who starred in many of his plays from Champignol malgré lui (1892) to On purge bébé! (1910); for La Dame de chez Maxim Feydeau discovered Armande Cassive, whom he moulded into his ideal leading lady for his later works.

=== 1900–1909 ===
The Feydeaus' marriage, happy for its first decade or so, had begun to go wrong by the early years of the 20th century. Feydeau gambled and lost large sums and in 1901 had to sell some of his valuable art collection; (Note: Feydeau's art collection included, at various times, works by Cézanne, Sisley, Corot, Monet, Pissarro, Renoir and Van Gogh.) his wife was said to have become bitter and spendthrift. Finance became a continual problem. Feydeau never regained the success he had enjoyed with La Dame de chez Maxim. A collaboration in 1902 with the composer Alfred Kaiser (Note: Alfred Kaiser (1872–1917) was a Belgian, later British, composer, a pupil of Anton Bruckner. He composed two more operas after this.) on a serious romantic opera, Le Billet de Joséphine, was not a success, closing after 16 performances. Of his first four plays of the 1900s, only La Main passe! (Note: Literally "The hand passes", as in card games, where play moves from player to player, variously rendered in English versions as "Your Deal" and "Chemin de Fer".) (1904) had a substantial run. La Puce à l'oreille (A flea in her ear) (1907) won glowing reviews, and seemed set to become one of the author's biggest box-office successes, but after 86 performances a leading member of the cast, the much loved comic actor Joseph Torin, died suddenly and the play was withdrawn; it was not seen again in Paris until 1952.

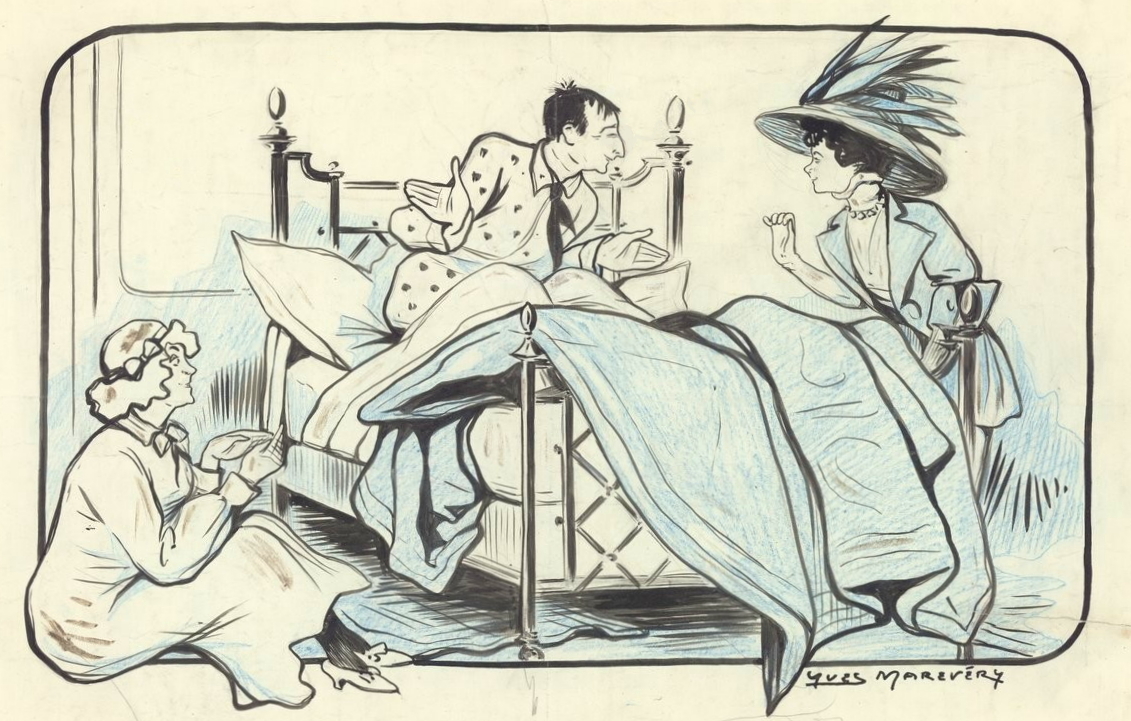
Occupe-toi d'Amélie!, 1908

In 1908 Occupe-toi d'Amélie! (Look after Amélie) opened at the Nouveautés. The reviewers were enthusiastic; in Le Figaro, Emmanuel Arène said:

M. Georges Feydeau has a spirit, a devil in him which it is impossible to resist. With him, you have to laugh, laugh again, laugh always. We are not deprived of that here. Even those who are not keen on vaudeville or that kind of theatre cannot escape from the contagion. What can one do when surrounded by such unleashed madness and delight?

In Les Annales du théâtre et de la musique Edmond Stoullig wrote:

The mighty, yes the mighty, vaudevillist who is M. Georges Feydeau! Ah, the hilarious farce, first cousin of the Lady from Maxim's, and destined, like her, to attract legions of spectators to the Nouveautés … laughing out loud, as we did without constraint and shamelessly.

The piece ran for 288 performances at the Nouveautés during 1908–09, and at the Théâtre Antoine for 96 performances later in 1909. (Note: The first run, at the Nouveautés, like that of some other long-running Feydeau pieces, was not continuous, but had a break in mid-run before resuming for its total tally of performances. Occupe-toi d'Amélie ran from March to November and then continued its run In December and January.)

=== Last years ===
Left to right, Feydeau with Sarah Bernhardt as witnesses at the wedding of Sacha Guitry and Yvonne Printemps, April 1919

In 1909, after a particularly acrimonious quarrel, Feydeau left home and moved into the Hotel Terminus in the Rue Saint-Lazare. He lived there, surrounded by his paintings and books, until 1919. He and Marie-Anne were divorced in 1916 and in 1918, now aged fifty-five, he embarked on an affair with a young dancer, Odette Darthys, whom he cast in the lead in revivals of his plays.

Occupe-toi d'Amélie! was the last full-length play Feydeau wrote on his own. Le Circuit (The road race, 1909) with Francis de Croisset made little impact. Je ne trompe pas mon mari (I don't cheat on my husband, 1914) with René Peter did well at the box office, with 200 performances, but in the view of Feydeau's biographer Leonard Pronko it has signs that "the dramatist had almost reached the end of his brilliant inventiveness". From 1908 Feydeau focused chiefly on a series of one-act plays, which he envisaged as a set to be called Du mariage au divorce (From marriage to divorce). Pronko describes the last of these, Hortense a dit: "je m'en fous!" ("Hortense says 'I don't give a damn'", 1916) "astringently funny … Feydeau's last dazzling gasp".

Feydeau had long been subject to depression, but in mid-1919 his family, alarmed at signs of a severe deterioration in his mental condition, called in medical experts; the diagnosis was dementia caused by tertiary syphilis. The condition was incurable, and Feydeau's sons arranged for him to be admitted to the Sanatorium de la Malmaison, a leading sanatorium at Rueil (present-day, Rueil-Malmaison). He spent his last two years there, imagining himself to be Napoleon III appointing ministers and issuing invitations to his coronation. (Note: In one of his lucid moments Feydeau complained that he was incarcerated for saying he was Napoleon III, but that another patient supposed himself to be President of France: the patient was the President of France, Paul Deschanel.)

Feydeau sank into a coma and died in the sanatorium at Rueil on 5 June 1921, aged fifty-eight. After a funeral at Sainte-Trinité, Paris, he was buried in the Montmartre Cemetery.

== Works ==
Feydeau wrote more than twenty comic monologues, and provided librettos for the composers Gaston Serpette, Alfred Kaiser and Louis Varney, but his reputation rests on those of his plays known in English as farces. He did not use that term for any of his works: he called them vaudevilles or comédies. The vaudeville, a genre that originated in the middle ages as a satirical song, evolved into a play in verse with music, and by Feydeau's time had split into two branches: opérettes, such as those by Offenbach, and, in the words of the writer Peter Meyer, "the vaudeville itself ... akin to what we would call slapstick farce, where movement was more important than character". Reviewers in the French press in Feydeau's time used both terms –"vaudeville" and "farce" – to label his plays.

La Puce à l'oreille (A Flea in Her Ear), 1907

Between 1878 and 1916 Feydeau completed twenty full-length and nineteen one-act plays. Eleven of them were written with a co-author, and not all were farcical; Le Ruban (The ribbon, 1894, in collaboration with Maurice Desvallières), is a comedy about a man's strenuous efforts to gain a state honour, and Le Bourgeon (The bud) is a comedy of manners with serious moments. The latter had a respectable run of 92 performances, (Note: A run of more than 100 performances was regarded as a "hit" in the Parisian theatre of the time.) but Feydeau's greatest successes were in farce. He said that he made so much money from La Dame de chez Maxim that he could afford to take two years' break from writing and devote himself instead to his hobby, painting. That play remains a favourite with French audiences; in English-speaking countries A Flea in Her Ear became the most popular.

=== Farcical style ===
The critic S. Beynon John contrasts Feydeau's farce with that of the English theatre of the same period – the latter "cosy and genial", and Feydeau's "sharply subversive". John also contrasts Feydeau with the earlier French farceur, Eugène Labiche: "Labiche's world, though fantasticated, is rooted in ordinary life; Feydeau's is cruel, claustrophobic, and smacks of mania". Discussing his technique, Feydeau said, "When I sit down to write a play I identify those characters who have every reason to avoid each other; and I make it my business to bring them together as soon, and as often, as I can." He also said that to make people laugh "you have to place ordinary people in a dramatic situation and then observe them from a comic angle, but they must never be allowed to say or do anything which is not strictly demanded, first by their character and secondly by the plot". Although in private life he was known for his wit, he carefully avoided it in his plays, holding that witty theatrical dialogue interrupted the action. (Note: When preparing the first English version of Occupe-toi d'Amélie! Noël Coward commented that only the visual action was funny. His attempt to inject some wit was regarded by some critics as misguided. John Mortimer admitted to adding "a collection of verbal jokes" in his Feydeau translations, but only in the first acts: in the second acts, he said, the action was all-important.)

The critic W. D. Howarth sums up Feydeau's typical dramatic template as "a nightmare sequence of events in otherwise unremarkable lives". In general the vaudeville or farcical events are confined to the second of three acts:

A typical plot establishes in Act I the need for secrecy on which the subterfuge and duplicity of the leading characters will depend; in Act II we move to a public meeting place – most notoriously a hotel of not very savoury reputation … Act III restores things to a somewhat precarious status quo.

Je ne trompe pas mon mari (I Don't Cheat on My Husband), 1920 revival

Howarth observes that "The nightmare quality of Feydeau's middle acts" depends not only on "frenzied comings and goings", but also on mechanical stage accessories such as the revolving bed in La Puce à l'oreille, which conveys its occupants into the adjoining room, seemingly at random. (Note: At the Hôtel Coq d'Or, where "only married couples come" but "not at the same time" a front bedroom has a bed next to a wall. If a couple making use of it are about to be intruded upon (by e.g. an outraged husband) the press of a button has the wall, and the bed and occupants with it, revolving horizontally 180 degrees into the back room, thereby bringing whoever is in the bed there into the front room.)

When Feydeau took a break from writing to study the works of his most successful predecessors, he focused in particular on three playwrights: Labiche, Hennequin and Meilhac. From Labiche he learned the importance of close observation of real-life characters, lending verisimilitude to the most chaotic situations. From Hennequin – who had started as an engineer – Feydeau drew the intricate plotting, described by Pronko as "endless mazes of crisscrossing couples, scurrying from door to door, room to room in every possible and impossible combination". From Meilhac he learned the art of writing polished dialogue, sounding elegant but natural. From these three influences, Feydeau fashioned what Pronko calls "the last great masterpieces of the vaudeville form".

Contemporary opinions of Feydeau covered a wide range. Catulle Mendès wrote, "I continue to deplore the fact that M. Georges Feydeau uses his truly remarkable talent on plays that will be performed four or five hundred times but that will never be read". For some, his late one-act plays are misogynistic; for others, they were his finest achievements, comparable with Strindberg in their naturalism; Feydeau was seen here as a moralist as well as an entertainer. For the authors of Les Annales du théâtre et de la musique, and critics in Le Figaro his farces were what made Feydeau incomparable. Later critics including Gidel, Pronko, Marcel Achard and Kenneth Tynan have judged that in his farces Feydeau was second only to Molière as France's great comic dramatist.

=== Full-length works ===
List of full-length works by Georges Feydeau
Title	Feydeau's description	Year	Theatre	Perfs	Title in English	Notes
Eglantine d'Amboise	pièce historique en deux actes et 3 tableaux	1873	–	–	The wild rose of Amboise	Juvenilia: not staged in Feydeau's lifetime
Tailleur pour dames	comédie en 3 actes	1886	Renaissance	79	Ladies' tailor	
La Lycéenne	vaudeville-opérette en 3 actes	1887	Nouveautés	20	The schoolgirl	music by Gaston Serpette
Chat en poche	vaudeville en 3 actes	1888	Déjazet	36	A pig in a poke	
Les Fiancés de Loches	vaudeville en 3 actes	1888	Cluny	64	The fiancés from Loches	with Maurice Desvallières
L'Affaire Edouard	vaudeville en 3 actes	1889	Variétés	17	The Edward affair	
Le Mariage de Barillon	vaudeville en 3 actes	1890	Renaissance	26	Barillon's wedding	with Desvallières
Monsieur chasse!	comédie en 3 actes	1892	Palais-Royal	114	Monsieur is hunting!	
Champignol malgré lui	vaudeville en 3 actes	1892	Nouveautés	434	Champignol despite himself	with Desvallières
Le Système Ribadier	vaudeville en 3 actes	1892	Palais-Royal	78	The Ribadier system	with Maurice Hennequin (Note: The play was revived in 1909 with a new title: Ni vu ni connu (roughly "What the eye doesn't see the heart doesn't grieve over").)
Le Ruban	vaudeville en 3 actes	1894	Odéon	45	The ribbon	with Desvallières
L'Hôtel du libre échange	vaudeville en 3 actes	1894	Nouveautés	371	Free Exchange Hotel	with Desvallières
Un fil à la patte	vaudeville en 3 actes	1894	Palais-Royal	129	Tied by the leg (Note: Variously rendered in English adaptations as "Cat Among the Pigeons", "Not by Bed Alone" and "Get Out of My Hair".)	
Le Dindon	comédie en 3 actes	1896	Palais-Royal	238	The dupe	
La Dame de chez Maxim	vaudeville en 3 actes	1899	Nouveautés	579	The lady from Maxim's	
Le Billet de Joséphine	opéra	1902	Gaîté	16	Josephine's letter	music by Alfred Kaiser
La Duchesse des Folies-Bergère	comédie en cinq actes	1902	Nouveautés	82	The duchess of the Folies-Bergère	
La Main passe!	comédie en quatre actes	1904	Nouveautés	211	The hand goes round	
L'Âge d'or	comédie musicale en 3 actes et neuf tableaux	1905	Variétés	33	The golden age	with Desvallières; music by Louis Varney
Le Bourgeon	comédie de moeurs en 3 actes	1906	Vaudeville	92	The bud	
La Puce à l'oreille	vaudeville en 3 actes	1907	Variétés	86	A flea in her ear	
Occupe-toi d'Amélie!	comédie en 3 actes	1908	Nouveautés	288	Look after Amélie	
Le Circuit	comédie en 3 actes et quatre tableaux	1909	Variétés	44	The road race	with Francis Croisset
Je ne trompe pas mon mari!	vaudeville en 3 actes	1914	Athénée	200	I don't cheat on my husband	with René Peter
Cent millions qui tombent	pièce en 3 actes		–	–	100 million falling	unfinished
À qui ma femme?	vaudeville en 3 actes		–	–	Whose is my wife?	not staged in Feydeau's lifetime. (Note: According to Jacques Lorcey in his 1972 study of Feydeau, the failure of La Lycéenne caused the playwright to suppress A qui ma femme?, which was complete, but remained unstaged and unpublished.)

=== One-act pieces ===
- L'Amour doit se taire (drame, "Love must be silent", 1878)
- Par la fenêtre (comédie, "Through the window", 1882)
- Amour et piano (comédie, "Love and piano", 1883)
- Gibier de potence (comédie-bouffe, "Gallows-bird", 1883)
- L'Homme de paille (comédie-bouffe, "The straw man", 1884)
- Fiancés en herbe (comédie enfantine, "Unripe fiancés", 1886)
- Deux coqs pour une poule (comédie, "Two cocks for one hen", 1887)
- Un bain de ménage (vaudeville, "A household bath", 1888)
- C'est une femme du monde (comédie, "She's a society lady"; with Desvallières, 1890)
- Notre futur (comédie, "Our future", 1894)
- Les Pavés de l'ours (comédie, "Save me from my friends", 1896)
- Dormez, je le veux! (vaudeville, "Sleep, I insist!", 1897)
- Séance de nuit (comédie, "Night session", 1897)
- Monsieur Nounou (pochade, "Monsieur Nounou"; with Desvallières, 1900)
- Feu la mère de Madame (vaudeville, "Madame's late mother", 1908)
- On purge bébé! (comédie, "Purging baby", 1910)
- Léonie est en avance (comédie, "Léonie is ahead of time", 1911)
- Mais n'te promène donc pas toute nue! (comédie, "Don't walk about stark naked", 1911)
- On va faire la cocotte (comédie, "We're going to play cocotte", unfinished, 1911)
- Hortense a dit: "je m'en fous!" (comédie, "Hortense says 'I don't give a damn'", 1916)

=== Monologues ===
==== For female performer ====
- La Petite révoltée ("The rebellious girl", 1880)
- Un coup de tête ("A whim", 1882)
- Aux antipodes ("Poles apart", 1883)

==== For male performer ====
- Le Mouchoir ("The handkerchief", 1881)
- J'ai mal aux dents ("I've got toothache", 1882)
- Le Potache ("The schoolboy", 1882)
- Trop vieux ("Too old", 1882)
- Un monsieur qui n'aime pas les monologues ("A gentleman who dislikes monologues", 1882)
- Patte en l'air ("Paw in the air", 1883)
- Le Petit Ménage ("The small household", 1883)
- Le Billet de mille ("The 1,000 note", 1884)
- Les Célèbres ("The famous", 1884)
- Le Volontaire ("The volunteer", 1884)
- Le Colis ("The parcel", 1885)
- Les Réformes ("The reformers", 1885)
- L'Homme économe ("The Thrifty man", 1886)
- L'Homme intègre ("The man of integrity", 1886)
- Les Enfants ("The children", 1887)
- Tout à Brown-Séquard ! ("Everything to Brown-Séquard", 1890)
- Le Juré ("The juror", 1898)
- Un monsieur qui est condamné à mort ("A gentleman who is condemned to death", 1899)
- Complainte du pauv' propriétaire ("The poor owner's complaint", 1916)
- Madame Sganarelle ("Madame Sganarelle")

== Legacy ==
L'Hôtel du libre échange, 1906

After his death Feydeau's plays were neglected for many years. It was not until the 1940s that major revivals were staged in Paris, after which Feydeau gradually became a staple of the repertory in France and abroad. The Comédie-Française admitted a Feydeau work to its repertoire for the first time in 1941, with a production of the one-act Feu la mère de Madame, directed by Fernand Ledoux, starring Madeleine Renaud and Pierre Bertin. At the Théâtre Marigny in 1948 Renaud starred in the first production of Occupe-toi d'Amélie! since Feydeau's 1908 original, with the company she co-founded with Jean-Louis Barrault. They took the production to Broadway in 1952, and the West End in 1956, playing in the original French and gaining enthusiastic reviews from the New York and London critics. In the meanwhile the Comédie-Française staged its first full-length Feydeau production, Le Dindon (1951). English adaptations had been familiar in Feydeau's day, and in the 1950s new versions began to appear, including Peter Glenville's Hotel Paradiso (1956, from L'Hôtel du libre échange) and Noël Coward's Look After Lulu! (1959, from Occupe-toi d'Amélie!); both were seen in the West End and on Broadway.

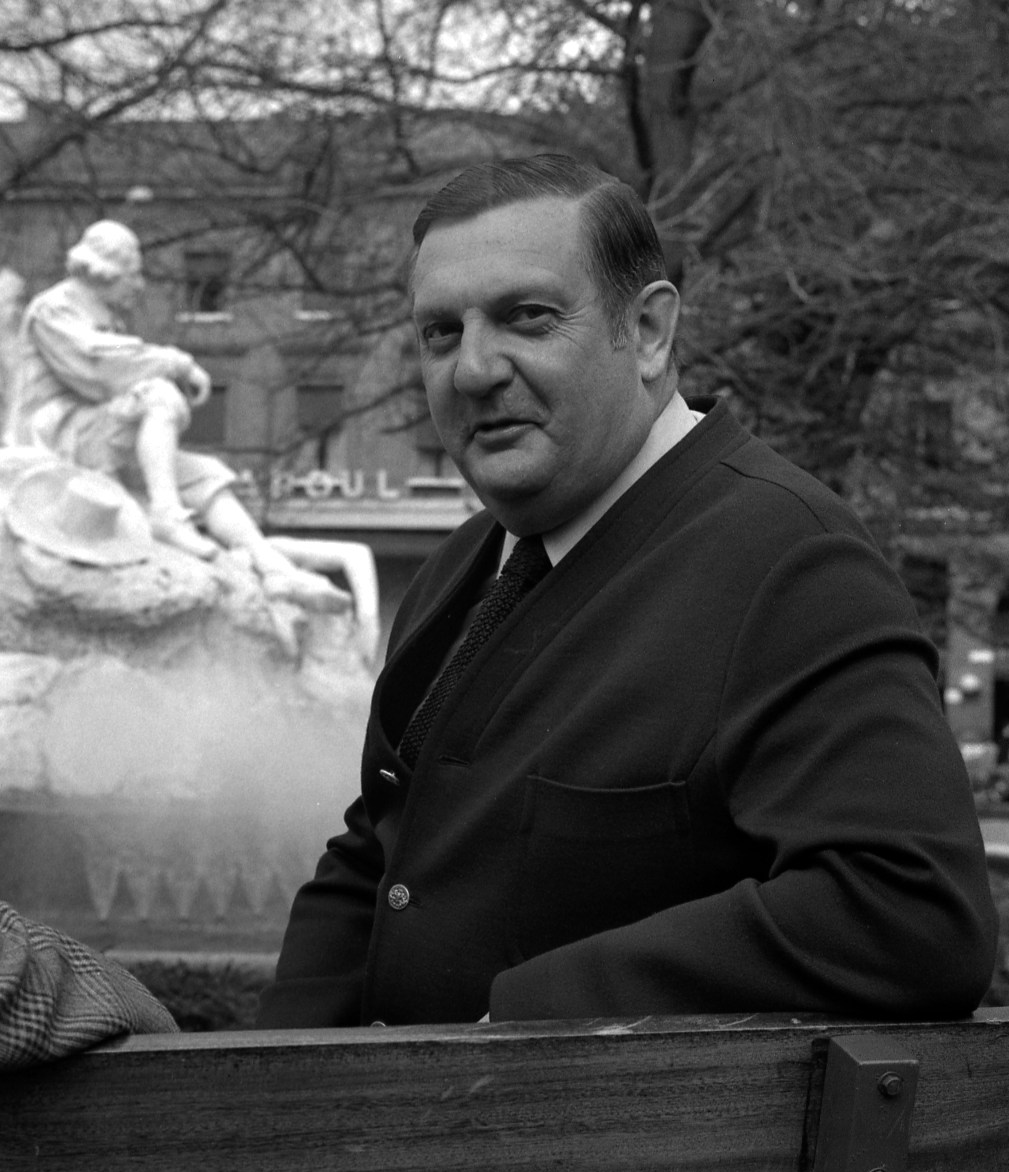
Jacques Charon, a leading Feydeau director of the 1950s and 60s

The 1960s saw two celebrated productions by Jacques Charon. The first was Un Fil à la patte (1961) for the Comédie-Française, which the company took to London in 1964. This led to an invitation from Laurence Olivier to Charon to direct John Mortimer's adaptation of La Puce à l'oreille as A Flea in Her Ear for the National Theatre (1966). Charon followed this with Mortimer's version of Un Fil à la patte (Cat Among the Pigeons) in the West End (1969). In the 1970s the Comédie-Française added two more Feydeau plays to its repertoire: Mais n'te promène donc pas toute nue! (1971) and La Puce à l'oreille (1978), both directed by Jean-Laurent Cochet. In New York there were productions of Le Dindon (1972 as There's One in Every Marriage), La Main passe (1973 as Chemin de fer), and Monsieur chasse! (1978, as 13 rue de l'amour). In London the National Theatre presented a second Mortimer adaptation, The Lady from Maxim's (1977).

During the last two decades of the twentieth century interest in Feydeau continued. The Comédie-Française presented four more of his plays: La Dame de chez Maxim (1981) directed by Jean-Paul Roussillon, Léonie est en avance (1985) directed by Stuart Seide, Occupe-toi d'Amélie! (1995) directed by Roger Planchon, and Chat en poche (1998) directed by Muriel Mayette. There were numerous Feydeau revivals in theatres in Paris, cities across France, and Brussels, including seven productions of Le Système Ribadier three of Monsieur chasse!, five of La Dame de chez Maxim, and four of La Puce à l'oreille. In London the National Theatre presented Mortimer's adaptation of L'Hôtel du libre-échange (1984, as A Little Hotel on the Side), which was later played on Broadway. Other English adaptations included Peter Hall and Nicki Frei's versions of Le Dindon (1994, as An Absolute Turkey) and Occupe-toi d'Amélie! (1996, as Mind Millie for Me).

During the first two decades of the 21st century, the Comédie-Française presented seven Feydeau productions: Le Dindon (2002, directed by Lukas Hemleb), Un Fil à la patte (2010 Jérôme Deschamps), Quatre pièces – a quadruple bill of one-act plays and a monologue (Amour et Piano, Un monsieur qui n'aime pas les monologues, Fiancés en herbe and Feu la mère de madame, 2009, Gian Manuel Rau), Le Cercle des castagnettes (monologues, 2012, Alain Françon), Le Système Ribadier (2013, Zabou Breitman), L'Hôtel du libre-échange (2017, Isabelle Nanty) and La Puce à l'oreille (2019, Lilo Baur). The Internet Broadway Database records no Feydeau productions in the 21st century. Among British productions were Frei's 2003 version of Le Système Rebadier (as Where There's a Will) directed by Hall and Mortimer's A Flea in Her Ear, revived at the Old Vic in 2010, directed by Richard Eyre.

== Adaptations ==
Several of Feydeau's plays have been adapted for the cinema and television. Although he was active well into the early years of film he never wrote for the medium, but within two years of his death in 1921 other writers and directors began to take his plays as the basis for films, of which more than twenty have been made, in several countries and languages. At least fourteen of his plays have been adapted for television.

== Notes, references and sources ==
=== Sources ===
- Coward, Noël (1982). Graham Payn; Sheridan Morley (eds.). The Noël Coward Diaries (1941–1969). London: Methuen. ISBN 978-0-297-78142-4.
- Esteban, Manuel (1983). Georges Feydeau. Boston: Twain. ISBN 978-0-8057-6551-9.
- Feydeau, Georges; John Mortimer (1968). A Flea in Her Ear. London: Samuel French. ISBN 978-0-573-01148-1.
- Gaye, Freda, ed. (1967). Who's Who in the Theatre (fourteenth ed.). London: Sir Isaac Pitman and Sons. OCLC 5997224.
- Gidel, Henry (1991). Georges Feydeau (in French). Paris: Flammarion. ISBN 978-2-08-066280-4.
- Hacht, Anne Marie; Dwayne D. Hayes (2009). "Feydeau, Georges". Gale Contextual Encyclopedia of World Literature, D–J. Detroit: Gale. ISBN 978-1-4144-3135-2.
- Hall, Peter (2000) [1993]. Making an Exhibition of Myself (second ed.). London: Oberon. ISBN 978-1-84002-115-8.
- Lesley, Cole (1976). The Life of Noël Coward. London: Cape. ISBN 978-0-224-01288-1.
- Lorcey, Jacques (1972). Georges Feydeau (in French). Paris: La Table ronde. OCLC 669869.
- Mander, Raymond; Joe Mitchenson (2000) [1957]. Theatrical Companion to Coward (second ed.). London: Oberon. ISBN 978-1-84002-054-0.
- Marcoux, J. Paul (1988). "Georges Feydeau and the 'serious' farce". In James Redmond (ed.). Farce. Cambridge and New York: Cambridge University Press. ISBN 978-0-521-35347-2.
- — (1994). "Introduction". Five By Feydeau. New York: Lang. ISBN 978-0-8204-2390-6.
- Meyer, Peter (2003). "Introduction". Feydeau. London: Oberon. ISBN 978-1-84943-993-0.
- Mortimer, John (1985). Georges Feydeau: Three Boulevard Farces. London: Penguin. ISBN 978-0-14-048191-4.
- Nahmias, Robert (1995). Tout l'humour de Feydeau (in French). Paris: Grancher. ISBN 978-2-08-066280-4.
- Noël, Edouard; Edmond Stoullig (1887). Les Annales du théâtre et de la musique, 1886. Paris: Charpentier. OCLC 172996346.
- —; — (1888). Les Annales du théâtre et de la musique, 1887. Paris: Charpentier. OCLC 172996346.
- —; — (1890). Les Annales du théâtre et de la musique, 1889. Paris: Charpentier. OCLC 172996346.
- —; — (1891). Les Annales du théâtre et de la musique, 1890. Paris: Charpentier. OCLC 172996346.
- —; — (1893). Les Annales du théâtre et de la musique, 1892. Paris: Charpentier. OCLC 172996346.
- —; — (1894). Les Annales du théâtre et de la musique, 1893. Paris: Charpentier. OCLC 172996346.
- —; — (1895). Les Annales du théâtre et de la musique, 1894. Paris: Charpentier. OCLC 172996346.
- —; — (1896). Les Annales du théâtre et de la musique, 1895. Paris: Charpentier. OCLC 172996346.
- Pronko, Leonard (1975). Georges Feydeau. New York: Ungar. ISBN 978-0-8044-2700-5.
- — (1982). Eugene Labiche and Georges Feydeau. London: Macmillan. ISBN 978-0-333-28897-9.
- Slonimsky, Nicholas; Laura Kuhn; Dennis McIntire (2001). "Kaiser, Alfred". In Laura Kuhn (ed.). Baker's Biographical Dictionary of Musicians (eighth ed.). New York: Schirmer. ISBN 978-0-02-866091-2.
- Stoullig, Edmond (1897). Les Annales du théâtre et de la musique, 1896. Paris: Ollendorff. OCLC 172996346.
- — (1900). Les Annales du théâtre et de la musique, 1899. Paris: Ollendorff. OCLC 172996346.
- — (1903). Les Annales du théâtre et de la musique, 1902. Paris: Ollendorff. OCLC 172996346.
- — (1904). Les Annales du théâtre et de la musique, 1903. Paris: Ollendorff. OCLC 172996346.
- — (1905). Les Annales du théâtre et de la musique, 1904. Paris: Ollendorff. OCLC 172996346.
- — (1906). Les Annales du théâtre et de la musique, 1905. Paris: Ollendorff. OCLC 172996346.
- — (1907). Les Annales du théâtre et de la musique, 1906. Paris: Ollendorff. OCLC 172996346.
- — (1908). Les Annales du théâtre et de la musique, 1907. Paris: Ollendorff. OCLC 172996346.
- — (1909). Les Annales du théâtre et de la musique, 1908. Paris: Ollendorff. OCLC 172996346.
- — (1910). Les Annales du théâtre et de la musique, 1909. Paris: Ollendorff. OCLC 172996346.
- — (1911). Les Annales du théâtre et de la musique, 1910. Paris: Ollendorff. OCLC 172996346.
- — (1915). Les Annales du théâtre et de la musique, 1914. Paris: Ollendorff. OCLC 172996346.
