= Jacques Charon =

French actor and film director

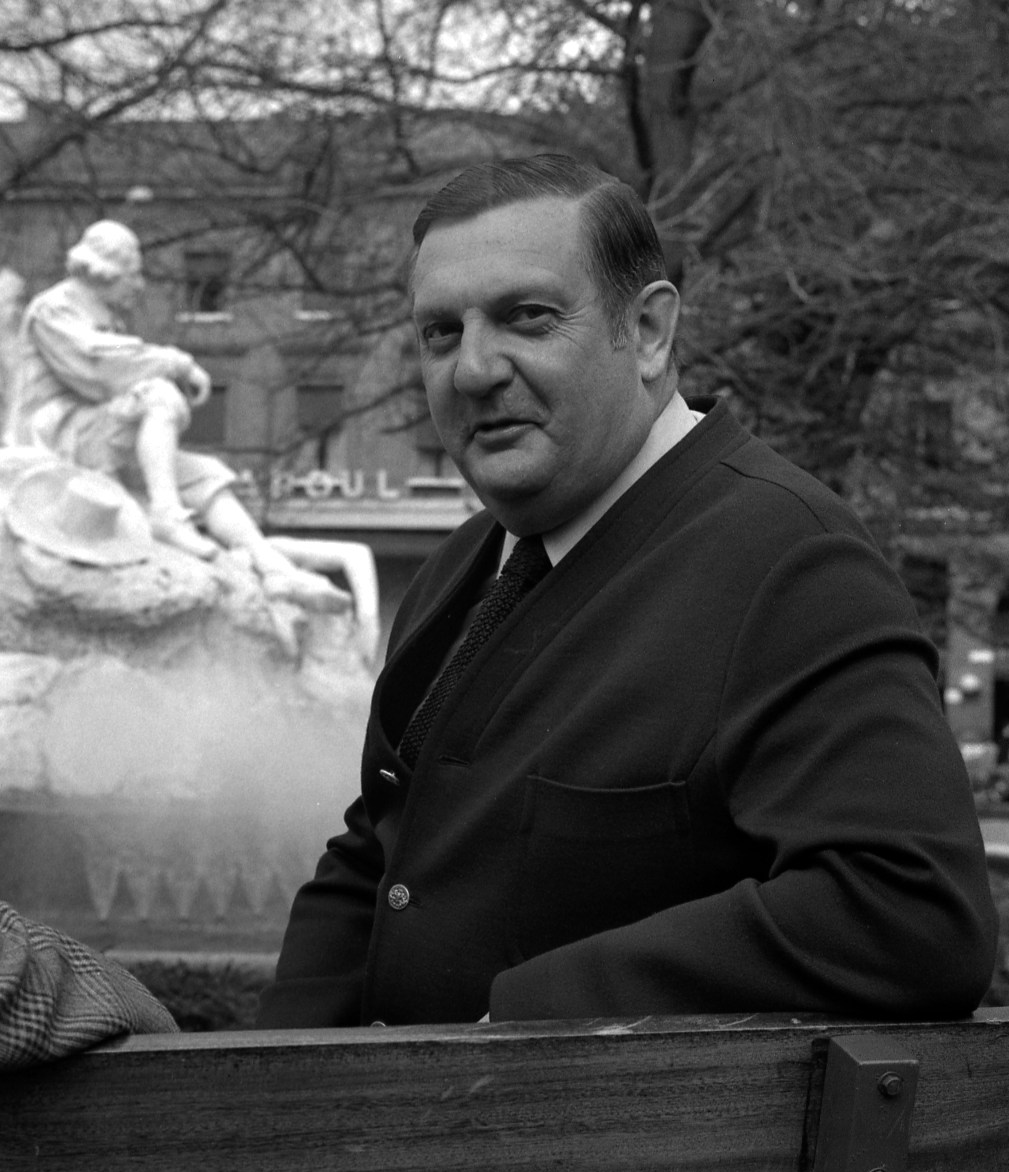
- Born: 27 February 1920; Paris, France
- Died: 15 October 1975 (aged 55); Paris, France
- Resting place: Cimetière de Montmartre
- Education: Conservatoire national supérieur d'art dramatique
- Occupation(s): Actor, film director

Jacques Charon (27 February 1920 – 15 October 1975) was a French actor and film director.

Born in Paris, Charon trained at the Conservatoire national supérieur d'art dramatique (CNSAD) and made his début at the Comédie-Française in 1941. During his time there which lasted until his death, he played over 150 roles in the classical and modern repertoire.

Charon directed the 1968 feature film A Flea in Her Ear and the 1973 television movie Monsieur Pompadour.

He played Spalanzani in the complete recording of The Tales of Hoffmann (Decca, 1971).

Charon was openly gay. He died in Paris and is buried in the Cimetière de Montmartre.

== Selected filmography ==
- Colonel Chabert (1943)
- Jericho (1946) - Count Jacques de Saint-Leu
- The Royalists (1947) - Lieutenant Merle
- The Paris Waltz (La Valse de Paris, 1950) - Berthelier
- Le Dindon (1951) - Pontagnac
- The Red Inn (1951) - Rodolphe
- Dakota 308 (1951) - Lord Vernon
- Little Jacques (1953) - Defence advocate Merlin
- Les Intrigantes (1954) - Antonio Pan
- Operation Thunder (1954) - Maurice Favier
- How to Succeed in Love (Comment réussir en amour, 1962) - Director of publisher Editions du Soleil
- How Do You Like My Sister? (1964) - Jolivet
- A Flea in Her Ear (1968 - director)
