= Les Annales du théâtre et de la musique =

Annual French periodical from 1875 to 1916

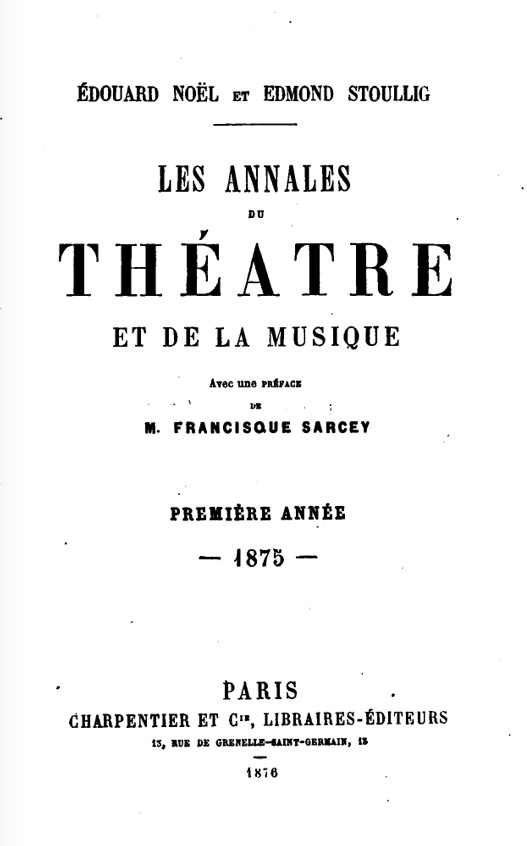
Title page for the year 1875

Les Annales du théâtre et de la musique (The Annals of Theatre and Music) was an annual French periodical which covered French dramatic and lyric theatre for 42 years, from 1875 to 1916. The volumes also covered concert series and necrology. It was co-edited by Édouard Noël (1848–1926) and Edmond Stoullig (1845–1918) and was published in Paris by Georges Charpentier from 1876 to 1895 and Berger-Levrault in 1896. Beginning in 1897 it was published annually by Paul Ollendorff (with Stoullig as the sole editor) up to 1914 with the penultimate volume published in 1916 (covering the years 1914–1915) and the final volume in 1918 (covering the year 1916). A total of 41 volumes were published.

Substantial prefaces were contributed by, among others, Émile Zola (1878), Victorin de Joncières (1880), Émile Perrin (1882), Charles Garnier (1883), Charles Gounod (1885), Jules Barbier (1886), Henri Meilhac (1889), Ludovic Halévy (1890), Émile Faguet (1897), Albert Carré (1899), Catulle Mendès (1902), Camille Saint-Saëns (1904), Jean Richepin (1905), Maurice Donnay (1908), Robert de Flers (1911), and Léon Blum (1912).
