= Alfred Maltby =

English actor, costume designer, playwright and columnist (c.1842–1901)

Maltby, c. 1896

Alfred Maltby (c. 1842 – 12 February 1901) was an English actor, costume designer, playwright and columnist. He began his theatrical career in 1872, becoming a much sought-after costume designer in the West End. By 1875 he began to write comic plays, which were successfully staged. Persuaded to take a role in one of his own pieces in 1876 he also began an acting career in which he specialised in playing comic, eccentric and usually elderly characters, for which portrayals he also earned enthusiastic reviews.

Maltby had a long and fruitful association with the actor-manager Charles Wyndham, becoming a regular member of his company at the Criterion Theatre in London. Outside the West End, Maltby toured in the British provinces and in Australia and New Zealand, maintaining simultaneous acting, designing and writing careers, and sometimes directing. He appeared in several of the first British productions of French farces by Alfred Hennequin and towards the end of his career he played in one of the first plays by Georges Feydeau to be seen in London. He also contributed columns to the humour magazines Judy and Fun.

== Life and career ==
=== Early years ===
Maltby studied costume design in Paris at the École des Beaux-Arts and began his theatrical career as a costume designer, starting with an 1872 Christmas production of The Black Crook at the Alhambra Theatre, London. The piece received poor reviews, but the costumes were warmly praised: The Morning Post observed, "Anything more perfect as to design and colour – so perfect, it may possibly be said – has never been seen on the stage". Maltby was then engaged by F. B. Chatterton at the Theatre Royal, Drury Lane, where he worked on Shakespeare productions together with the scene painter, William Roxby Beverly. Maltby's designs continued to impress reviewers. In 1875 The Era praised "the genius he has displayed in the designs for grotesque, gorgeous and elaborate costumes". A later reviewer praised his "wonderful originality and the most exquisite taste … almost literally enchanting". Maltby became much sought after, and recalled that in one Christmas season he designed the costumes for shows at twelve different theatres.

Maltby also wrote, and a comic play of his, Make Yourself at Home, was staged at the Holborn Empire in 1875 as the last item in a triple bill. In 1876 the actor Charles Collette invited Maltby to write him a one-act farce, suggesting it should be based on the 18th-century comedy A Bold Stroke for a Wife. The result, Bounce, was successfully played on tour and then at the Opera Comique in a double-bill with Collette's play Cryptoconchoidsyphonostomata. Collette persuaded the author to take a part in his own piece and to take over the role of the querulous eccentric Toddleposh in Collette's play. After this, Maltby divided his time between acting, writing and costume design.

=== Wyndham and The Criterion ===
As the tutor in Betsy, 1879

In 1877 the actor-manager Charles Wyndham was starring at the Criterion Theatre in The Great Divorce Case, an adaptation of Hennequin and Delacour's farce Le Procès Veauradieux. The success of the piece in the West End prompted a provincial tour, managed by Richard D'Oyly Carte. Wyndham had seen Maltby as Toddleposh and thought him ideal for the role of the eccentric and somnolent Wetherby Grandison. Maltby was reluctant to take the part, but Carte, together with Maltby's friend the theatre manager John Gunn, persuaded him. This began a long association between Wyndham and Maltby. The former's next London production, The Pink Dominos (1877), was also a box-office success, and he sent out a touring company with Maltby again cast as an eccentric old gentleman. The Era ranked his performances in the two plays as "among the most remarkable in modern comedy".

When Wyndham was preparing the London production of a third farce – Betsy (1879), F. C. Burnand's adaptation of Bébé – he cast Maltby as the eccentric tutor. The play was a success, and Maltby was highly praised in the press. He played the part in several revivals of the piece, and in 1896 The Sketch said of him, "No playgoer will ever call to mind the name of Mr. Alfred Maltby without thinking of his wonderful performance of Samuel Dawson, B.A., the private tutor in Betsy". For the first production, Maltby contributed further by writing a two-act curtain raiser, a "comic drama" called Jilted, which The Era later described as one of his cleverest achievements as a writer". At the Criterion and later, Maltby played his eccentric old gentlemen characters in such plays as Truth, The Candidate, The Man with Three Wives, My Artful Valet and others "too numerous to mention". The Sketch reviewer also noted that Maltby had "severe epidemics as regards the various kinds of old gentlemen he is called upon to portray ... at one time he had a very violent attack of fiery old colonels; at another, it was plausible scoundrels; at another, Members of Parliament."

=== Playwright; Australasia ===
Maltby combined his membership of Wyndham's Criterion company with his continuing career as a writer and designer. He provided a libretto for Hervé's music for the Alhambra Theatre's 1880 Christmas piece, Mefistofele II, and co-wrote and appeared in La Belle Normande, an opéra bouffe adapted from Léon Vasseur's La Famille Trouillat. He was co-author of The Three Hats (1883), an adaptation of Hennequin's Les Trois chapeaux, and author of Old Flames (1884), an English version of 115 Rue Pigalle by Alexandre Bisson. Another well-received piece was his farce Borrowed Plumes (Adelphi Theatre, 1885). When Wyndham revived the 18th-century comedy Wild Oats in 1886 Maltby played Lamp, the oily theatrical manager. A Criterion colleague, the actor Harry Saint Maur, described Maltby as an instinctive actor, getting straight to the essence of a character without painstaking analysis, and commented: "But then, he, Selina Dolaro, and a few other people of a like calibre I have met with are geniuses".

Later in 1886 Wyndham sent a company to Australia and New Zealand. Maltby was known to playgoers there as the author of The Three Hats, which proved popular with audiences in both countries, and he was well received as a performer. During his stay, in addition to playing several of his regular parts, he designed costumes for, and co-wrote, the Theatre Royal, Melbourne's Christmas pantomime, played his first non-comic role, Captain Redwood in Jim the Penman, and directed several plays. (Note: Contemporary press references name him as "stage manager". In the 19th century, the term "stage-manager" covered the artistic functions now ascribed to directors as well as the purely technical aspects of staging to which "stage-manager" has subsequently come to be restricted.)

=== Later years ===
Maltby and Ellis Jeffreys in His Little Dodge (1896)

Throughout the late 1880s and 1990s Maltby continued his tripartite career as actor, writer and designer. In addition to plays, his writing included regular contributions to Judy and Fun. Having made his name as an actor in the plays of the "father of French farce", Alfred Hennequin, he starred in 1896 in one of the first farces of Hennequin's successor Georges Feydeau to be given in London. Maltby appeared with Fred Terry, Weedon Grossmith and Ellis Jeffreys in His Little Dodge (1896), an adaptation of Le Système Ribadier by Feydeau and Hennequin's son Maurice. The Era described Maltby and the play as "making a big hit".

Maltby's last play, in which he made his final stage appearance, was the farce My Soldier Boy, co-written with Frank Lindo, given at the Criterion in 1899. Maltby's co-stars were Grossmith and Jeffreys. The Morning Post praised it for having "all the ingenuity, without any of the impropriety, of the best French farce.

Maltby died at his home in Chipperfield, Hertfordshire, on 12 February 1901, aged 59.

== Notes, references and sources ==
=== Sources ===
- Charney, Maurice (2005). Comedy: A Geographic and Historical Guide. Westport, Conn. and London: Praeger. ISBN 978-0-313-32706-3.
- Pemberton, T. Edgar (1903). The Criterion Theatre. London: Criterion. OCLC 767530190.
