= Les Dominos roses =

Les Dominos roses (The Pink Dominos) is a three-act farce by Alfred Delacour and Alfred Hennequin. It concerns a plan by two wives to test their husbands' fidelity. At a masked ball at the Paris Opéra, each wife disguises herself in a pink domino – a hooded cloak with a mask – to woo the other's husband.

The play was first produced at the Théâtre du Vaudeville, Paris on 17 April 1876 and ran for 127 performances. It was adapted for the West End and Broadway stages as The Pink Dominos, and later became the basis of a Viennese operetta (Der Opernball, 1898) and a musical comedy (To-Night's the Night, 1914).

== Background and first production ==
In 1876 the Théâtre du Vaudeville emerged from a succession of short and unprofitable runs with the production of Le Procès Veauradieux by Alfred Delacour and Alfred Hennequin, which ran for 175 performances, at a time when a run of 100 performances was regarded as a success for a Parisian theatre. The authors' next piece for the house was Les Dominos roses. It opened on 17 April 1876 and ran for a total of 127 performances. The run was not continuous as, in common with other Paris theatres, the Vaudeville closed for several weeks during the height of each summer.

- Beaubuisson – François Parade
- Georges Duménil – Alfred Dieudonné
- Paul Aubier – Pierre Berton
- Henri – Albert Carré
- Philippe – M. Michel
- Germain – M. Bource
- Head waiter – M. Jourdan
- Waiter – M. Vaillant
- Marguerite, wife of Georges – Lucie Davray
- Angèle, wife of Paul – Gabrielle Réjane
- Mme Beaubuisson – Mlle Alexis
- Hortense, maid to Marguerite – Mlle Pierski
- Foedora – Mlle Piccolo

Source: Playscript.

== Plot ==
Marguerite and Angèle are two young married women. The former is a mildly cynical Parisienne, and the latter a more innocent country girl. Angèle is indignant when her friend suggests that all husbands are untrustworthy, and she agrees to Marguerite's suggestion of putting the matter to a practical test. Each will attempt to woo the other's husband at a masked ball at the Opéra. With the aid of Hortense, Marguerite's maid, they concoct notes from supposed anonymous admirers to Georges and Paul, their spouses, inviting them to a rendezvous that evening. Both husbands fall for the ploy and invent plausible excuses for absenting themselves from home that night. Each meets his friend's wife, who is disguised under the folds of a "pink domino". (The Oxford English Dictionary defines a domino as "A kind of loose cloak, apparently of Venetian origin, chiefly worn at masquerades, with a small mask covering the upper part of the face").

Paul with Marguerite on his arm, and Georges conducting Angèle, both adjourn after midnight to private dining rooms in a fashionable restaurant. The potential for confusion is enhanced by the presence in another private room of Hortense, the maid, also wearing a pink domino. She is escorted by Henri, a young lawyer, the nephew of Marguerite's formidable aunt, Madame Beaubuisson. When the three couples have supped, and the champagne has flowed freely, a series of "quiproquos" – mistaken identities (Note: In French theatrical usage a quiproquo is one character being mistaken for another, a key device of farce.) – follows, in which there is a continual, rapid interchange of partners. Hortense flirts with each of the men in turn, and eventually all three couples leave.

Next morning Paul finds that Georges's wife had been at the ball, wearing a domino rose; Georges learns the same as regards Angèle. There is no doubt in the mind of either that he has terribly injured his friend, and both are conscience-stricken. A bracelet has been found in the restaurant, which fell from the arm of the mysterious "pink domino", and, in the midst of noisy and fruitless explanations between the whole party, it is brought in. This relieves Paul and Georges from their self recriminations, but it leads to a discovery that almost equally confounds them, for it turns out to belong to Madame Beaubuisson, a grande dame who for thirty years has been seen as a model of rectitude. In the end this mystery, as well as all the other incidents of the evening, is explained when it becomes known that the young lawyer had borrowed some of his aunt's jewellery with which to adorn Hortense. The latter's domino is produced; Paul sees in it a hole that had been burned by his cigar; Georges sees a corner that he had accidentally torn, and both are consequently enlightened as to whose conquest they have effected. Each keeps his knowledge to himself. Marguerite is pleased at the success of her plan and Angèle has had her lesson in Parisian philosophy; Marguerite has no great confidence that the men's reformation will last, but both wives are satisfied to forgive the antics of their penitent husbands.

Source: The Era.

== Reception ==
In the Journal amusant Pierre Véron wrote, "I will not tell you that the laughter completely escapes vulgarity, but the important thing is to have fun, and frankly we were very amused with the frenetic comings and goings. Quiproquos go round and round … misunderstandings succeed surprises". The Journal officiel de la République française commented, "Really, if we were to believe the vaudevillists, we would have a strange idea of Parisian households. There are only conjugal misfortunes, marriage contracts hacked about, perpetual distrust, shady permutations of husbands and wives, an entire structure of betrayal and lies only just propped up, and collapsing in the last act amid the bursts of laughter from the audience." The Paris correspondent of the London paper The Era found the play "very laughable … highly amusing" and the third act in particular "a marvel of merriment". The critic wondered whether the piece could be staged in any other city than Paris "so thinly-veiled is the impropriety that renders its incidents amusing", but by October the play was running successfully in Brussels.

== Adaptations ==
The play was adapted into English by James Albery as The Pink Dominos. It opened in London in March 1877, starring Charles Wyndham and ran for 555 performances. The same adaptation was given on Broadway between August and November 1877 starring Charles F. Coghlan. At the same time the original French version was running at New York's Théâtre-Français: The Boston Daily Globe found it "exceedingly brisk and amusing … far brighter and more natural than its English version". The Albery version was revived in London by Charles Hawtrey in 1889. An Italian adaptation of the original, Un domino color di rosa, was presented at the Teatro San Genesio in Rome in 2019 by the Compagnia Isigold.

In 1896 an operatic version, Der Opernball, was premiered in Vienna. The libretto was adapted from Delacour and Hennequin's original by Viktor Léon and Heinrich von Waldberg, and the music was by Richard Heuberger. In his history of operetta (2003) Richard Traubner describes Der Opernball as the final work of the golden age of Viennese operetta.

In 1914 the play was the basis of a new musical comedy, To-Night's the Night, with music by Paul Rubens and Jerome Kern, with lyrics by Percy Greenbank and Rubens, and a book adapted by Fred Thompson. It was first seen on Broadway, where it ran for 155 performances. The same production opened in London in 1915, running for 460 performances.

== Notes, references and sources ==
=== Sources ===
- Delacour, Alfred; Alfred Hennequin (1884). Les Dominos roses. Paris: Allouard. OCLC 697961532.
- Mander, Raymond; Joe Mitchenson (1968). Lost Theatres of London. London: Rupert Hart-Davis. OCLC 41974.
- Noël, Edouard; Edmond Stoullig (1876). Les Annales du théâtre et de la musique, 1875. Paris: Charpentier. OCLC 172996346.
- Noël, Edouard; Edmond Stoullig (1877). Les Annales du théâtre et de la musique, 1876. Paris: Charpentier. OCLC 172996346.
- Traubner, Richard (2003). Operetta: A Theatrical History. New York and London: Routledge. ISBN 978-0-415-96641-2.
