= Ellis Jeffreys =

British actress (1868–1943)

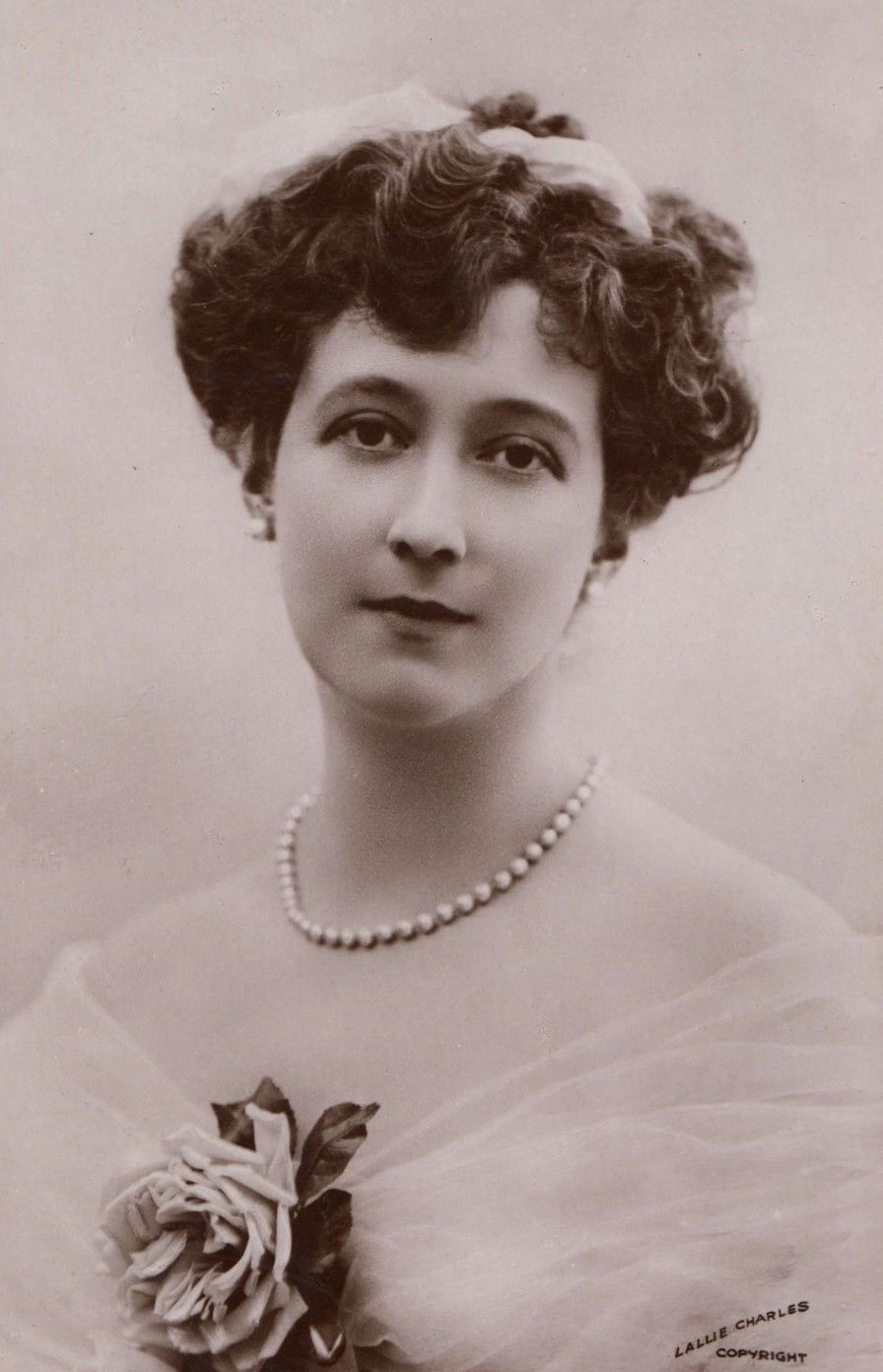
Ellis Jeffreys

Minnie Gertrude Ellis Jeffreys (12 May 1868(?) (Note: There is, as is often the case with actresses born in the 19th century, some doubt about Jeffreys's year of birth. Sources including The Times and Who's Who in the Theatre give the year as 1872; a biographical sketch at the Who Was Who in the D'Oyly Carte website gives the year as 1868; American and Canadian newspapers reporting her death gave her age as 74 and the year of birth 1868; the obituary in The Stage gave her age at death as 69, which would make the year of birth 1873.) – 21 January 1943) was an English actress, best known for her comedy roles.

Jeffreys was born in Ceylon and made her stage debut in London in 1889. She quickly became a leading West End player. In the early 1890s she had a long run in the operetta La Cigale, and then was a member of Charles Wyndham's company at the Criterion Theatre. In 1895 she created a role in The Notorious Mrs Ebbsmith, which she played in London and on Broadway.

Most of her roles were in modern-dress drawing room comedy, but she also acted in classics including She Stoops to Conquer and The School for Scandal. In several years between 1895 and 1906 she was seen in the US, both on Broadway and in national tours. After that she continued to play in Britain, mostly in the West End, into the 1930s. During that decade she appeared in thirteen films, before retiring in 1938, five years before her death.

== Life and career ==
=== Early years ===
Jeffreys was born in Colombo, Ceylon (now Sri Lanka), the daughter of Captain Dodsworth Jeffreys and his wife Elizabeth, née Corcor. She made her stage debut at the Savoy Theatre, London, with the D'Oyly Carte Opera Company in 1889 in the chorus of The Yeomen of the Guard. (Note: According to a newspaper article in 1904 "Having charmed Sir Arthur Sullivan with her sweet mezzo-soprano voice, he gave her a part in The Yeomen of the Guard during the last six weeks of its run".) She then appeared at Her Majesty's Theatre in December 1889, as Butterfly in the pantomime Cinderella, after which she was engaged for the Lyric Theatre where she appeared in 1890 as Polly in The Sentry and then during the long run of La Cigale, she played and sang several leading female roles. In the early 1890s Jeffreys was a member of Charles Wyndham's company at the Criterion Theatre, where she appeared in The Bauble Shop, The Fringe of Society, The Headless Man, Betsy, Madame Favart, La Mascotte and Haste to the Wedding.

In 1894 Jeffreys married the Hon Frederick Graham Curzon, the younger son of the 3rd Earl Howe. Unlike some actresses who retired after marrying into the aristocracy, she continued her stage career. At the Garrick Theatre in 1895, she created the role of Mrs Gertrude Thorpe in The Notorious Mrs Ebbsmith in a starry cast that included Mrs Patrick Campbell, John Hare, Johnston Forbes-Robertson and Gerald du Maurier. When Hare took the production to the US, Jeffreys joined him in the Broadway cast, along with Julia Neilson and Fred Terry.

Alfred Maltby and Jeffreys in His Little Dodge (1896)

=== West End star ===
On her return to England Jeffreys played in The Misogynist at the St James's Theatre, with George Alexander and Allan Aynesworth. She continued to appear in Alexander's company both in London and on tour in his Ruritanian play The Prisoner of Zenda, handing her role over to Fay Davis in October 1896. Still under Alexander's management she then returned to her more familiar territory of modern-dress comedy as Lady Miranda in His Little Dodge, an adaptation of a Feydeau farce. The Pall Mall Gazette judged that Jeffreys's highly promising gift for comedy had now come to fruition, and thought her the best of the cast, which also included Fred Terry, Weedon Grossmith and Alfred Maltby. The theatrical newspaper The Era said:

Miss Ellis Jeffreys was so exactly the fresh, dainty and refined English wife that any suggestiveness in her lines was robbed of half its repulsiveness by her personality … Her appearance was delightfully arch and impudent; her delivery was daintily expressive; her appearance was smartness personified; and the adjective "charming" might have been applied to her with its normal meaning, and not with its conventional insignificance.

As Lady Sneerwell in The School for Scandal, 1909

Her first marriage ended in 1903, when she obtained a divorce on the grounds of Curzon's cruelty and adultery; she was awarded custody of their two children, Evelyn Ellis Isabella and George (later a successful actor). In 1904 she married the actor-manager Herbert Sleath (1870–1921), to whom she remained married for the rest of his life. They had no children.

In several years between 1895 and 1906, Jeffreys was seen in the US, both on Broadway and in national tours. In 1905 and 1906, for example, Jeffreys divided her time between London and the US. She appeared on Broadway as Queen Sonia in The Prince Consort and on an American tour as Lady Gay Spanker in London Assurance. After playing in On the Love Path at the Haymarket Theatre she returned to New York, to create the part of Lady Clarke Howland in The Fascinating Mr Vanderveldt, reappeared in London at the Duke of York's Theatre in a revival of The Marriage of Kitty, and again returned to New York, playing Mrs Brooke in The Dear Unfair Sex, after which she starred in a coast-to-coast tour as Kate Hardcastle in She Stoops to Conquer.

On her return to England Jeffreys appeared at His Majesty's Theatre, in May 1907, as Mrs Allonby in A Woman of No Importance in a cast that also contained Herbert Beerbohm Tree, Marion Terry, Kate Cutler and Viola Tree. In October 1907 Jeffreys appeared in the opening production of the Queen's Theatre in Madeleine Lucette Ryley's comedy The Sugar Bowl, under her husband's management. Also with Sleath's company she toured in Edwin Milton Royle's A White Man. At His Majesty's in 1909 Jeffreys played a part some way removed from her usual agreeable and attractive characters, appearing as the vicious Lady Sneerwell in Tree's production of The School for Scandal. Reviews were good, and although The Athenaeum thought Jeffreys adopted "perhaps rather too gentle a manner to suggest the widow's acidity of temper", The Morning Post found her "agreeably disagreeable".

=== Later years ===
Jeffreys in 1923

Later roles included Mrs Quesnel in The Case of Rebellious Susan and Madge Bolt in Is Matrimony a Failure? at the Criterion (1911), Comtesse Zicka in a revival of Diplomacy at Wyndham's (1913) and Mrs Cameron in The Flag Lieutenant at the Haymarket (1914). At the Globe, Jeffreys played the Countess Olga in Fedora in 1920 and Emily Ladew in Her Husband's Wife in 1921. The following year she was seen at Drury Lane as the Lady Violante in Decameron Nights. Other roles included Lady Frinton in The Last of Mrs Cheyney at the St James's in 1925, Lady Trench in Frederick Lonsdale's Never Come Back with Allan Aynesworth, Viola Tree and the young Raymond Massey at the Phoenix Theatre in 1932 and Lady Mary Crabb in Fresh Fields at the Criterion in 1933.

In the 1930s Jeffreys appeared in thirteen films, playing Mrs Langford in Raise the Roof (1930), Elizabeth Green in Birds of Prey (1931), Lady Marian Mainwaring in Tilly of Bloomsbury (1931), Aunt Emily Debrant in Leap Year (1932), Lady Ellerslie in Two White Arms (1932), Lady Marshall in The Barton Mystery (1933), Frau Kleiner in Where Is This Lady? (1933), Mrs Carmichael in Lilies of the Field (1934), Lady Elizabeth in Eliza Comes to Stay (1936), Lady Madeleine Knox in Limelight (1936), Mrs Hammond in While Parents Sleep (1936), Lady Maude Wall in Return of a Stranger (1937) and Lady Tonbridge in Sweet Devil (1938).

Jeffreys retired in 1938, and died at her home in Chobham, Surrey on 21 January 1943. In an obituary notice The Stage said of her, "Ellis Jeffreys had all the qualities of a comedy actress – fine presence, keen humour, feeling, ease and distinction of manner, polish, and an accomplished technique". The Times said:

Tall and graceful, with an expressive face and a clear, rather incisive manner of speech, Miss Jeffreys was a true comedian, though not lacking in the dramatic force necessary for certain parts which she played in the comedies of Jones, for Zicka in Diplomacy or Olga in Fedora.

== Notes, references and sources ==
=== Sources ===
- Nissen, Axel (2016). Accustomed to Her Face. Jefferson NC: McFarland. ISBN 978-0-7864-9732-4.
- Parker, John, ed. (1925). Who's Who in the Theatre (fifth ed.). London: Sir Isaac Pitman and Sons. OCLC 10013159.
