= Der Opernball =

1898 operetta

Der Opernball (The Opera Ball) is an operetta in three acts with music by Richard Heuberger, and libretto by Viktor Léon and Heinrich von Waldberg, based on the 1876 comedy Les Dominos roses by Alfred Delacour and Alfred Hennequin. The 1877 farce The Pink Dominos and the 1914 musical To-Night's the Night are other adaptations of the original play.

Alexander von Zemlinsky assisted Heuberger with the orchestration. Its premiere was at the Theater an der Wien, Vienna, Austria, on 5 January 1898. The most famous number from the operetta is the waltz duet Geh'n wir in's Chambre séparée. The operetta remains in the repertoire of German-language opera companies, such as the Vienna Volksoper.

== Roles ==
- Theophil Beaubuisson, retiree (bass)
- Palmyra Beaubuisson, his wife (contralto)
- Henri, naval cadet, their nephew (tenor or mezzo-soprano)
- Paul Aubier (tenor)
- Angèle, wife of Paul and niece to Madame Beaubuisson (soprano)
- Georges Duménil (tenor, buffo role)
- Marguérite Duménil, wife of Georges (soprano)
- Hortense, chambermaid of the Duménils (soubrette)
- Féodora, a chansonette (soprano)
- Philippe, waiter in the opera entrance hall (tenor)
- Jean, Baptiste, Alfonse, waiters
- Germain, a servant

== Synopsis ==
The setting is Paris during Carnival, towards the end of the 19th century.

Act 1
Paul Aubier and his wife Angèle are guests of Georges and Marguérite Duménil. Marguérite is sceptical of the fidelity of men in marriage, and she persuades Angèle to put their husbands to the test. On their instructions, the chambermaid Hortense writes two identical letters which invite Paul and Georges to an opera ball at the Paris Opera, where they will meet a lady with a pink domino as part of her dress. Secretly, Hortense writes a third such letter for the cadet Henri, because she wants to appear also with the pink domino.
Act 2
The setting is the opera ball, where everyone is masked. The old Beaubuisson, Henri's uncle, is accompanied by the singer Féodora. Of the three ladies with the pink domino, Henri sees the pink domino on Hortense, Georges sees it on Angèle, and Paul on Marguérite. Georges and Paul hope to meet the mysterious lady each in a chambre séparée. However, Angèle and Marguérite have arranged for a bell signal, at whose sound the lovers are to meet outside the rooms. In the confusion, Paul and Georges meet each other, and not the expected lady. Furthermore, they each then see Hortense with the pink domino, not knowing who she is. Each tries to engage the lady, but in the process, Hortense's pink domino gets scorched and ripped. Marguérite and Angèle are both unaware of the presence of Hortense.
Act 3
Back at his residence, Georges discovers the writing paper on which the invitation to the opera ball was written and tries to figure out the situation. Things build to the point where Georges challenges Paul to a duel. Finally, Marguérite and Angèle show their intact pink dominoes, which nominally proves the fidelity of their husbands. The role of Hortense in the plot is revealed to all.

== Film versions ==
Three films have been made of Der Opernball.

- Opera Ball (dir. Géza von Bolváry, 1939), with Paul Hörbiger, Marte Harell, Hans Moser, Heli Finkenzeller, Theo Lingen, Fita Benkhoff, Will Dohm
- Opera Ball (dir. Ernst Marischka, 1956), with Johannes Heesters, Hertha Feiler, Josef Meinrad, Sonja Ziemann, Adrian Hoven, Fita Benkhoff, Theo Lingen (reprising the role of Germain, the servant)
- Der Opernball (dir. Eugen York, 1971, for ZDF), with Harald Serafin, Helen Mané, Maurice Besançon, Maria Tiboldi, Uwe Friedrichsen, Christiane Schröder

== Recordings ==
Year	Theofil, Palmira, Henri Paul, Angèle Georges, Marguérite	Conductor, opera house and orchestra	Label
2016	Gerhard Ernst, Lotte Marquardt, Alexander Kalmbacher; Ivan Oreščanin, Nadja Mchantaf; Martin Fournier, Margareta Klobučar	Marius Burkert, Grazer Philharmonisches Orchester, chorus of Graz Opera (Recording Opera Graz 2–6 February 2016)	CD: Classic Produktion Osnabrück (CPO); Cat: 555 070-2
