= To-Night's the Night (musical) =

- A Musical Play
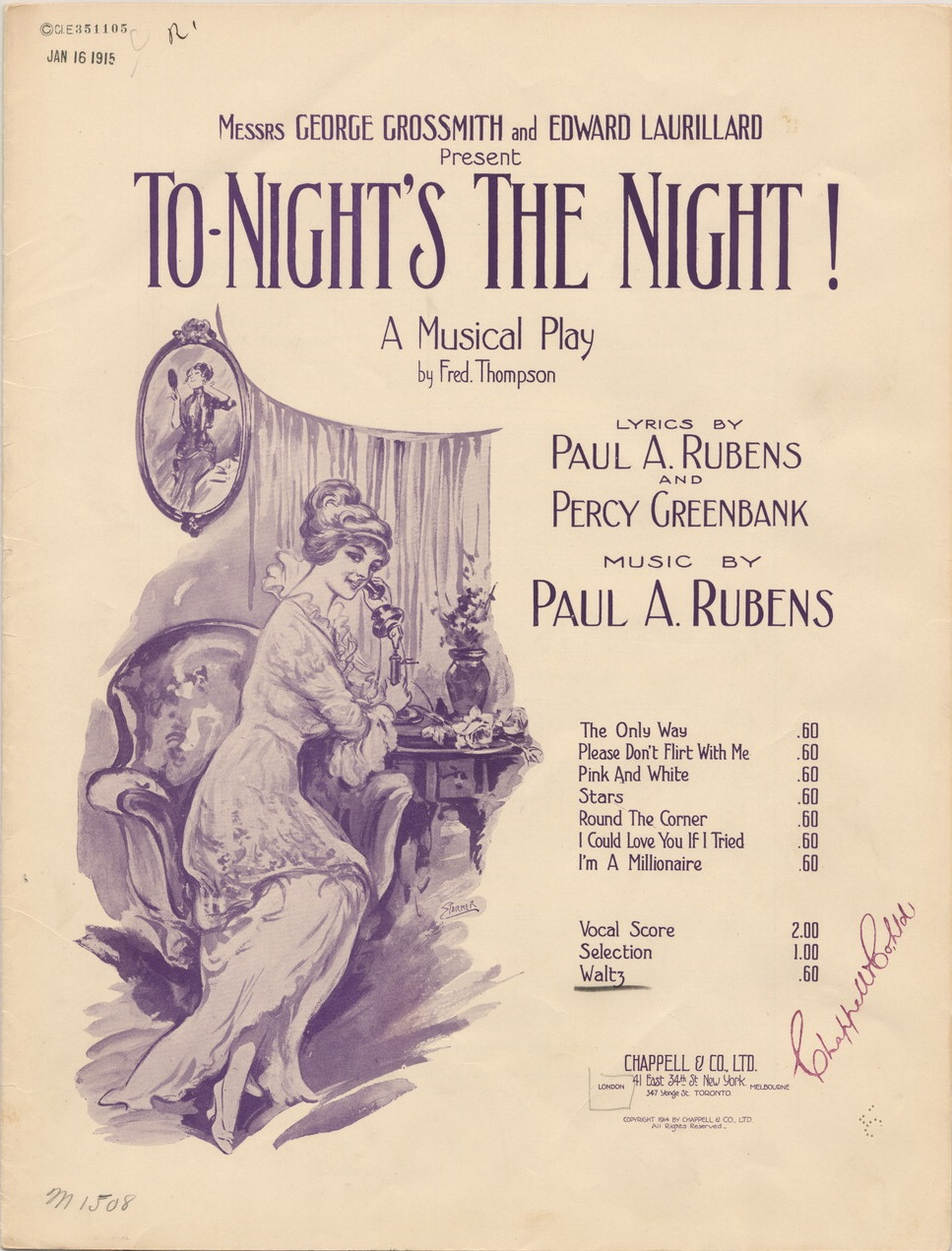
- Original sheet music cover
- Music: Paul Rubens
- Lyrics: Paul Rubens; Percy Greenbank
- Book: Fred Thompson
- Basis: The farce Les Dominos roses
- Productions: 1914 Broadway

To-Night's the Night is a musical comedy composed by Paul Rubens, with lyrics by Percy Greenbank and Rubens, and a book adapted by Fred Thompson. Two songs were composed by Jerome Kern. The story is based on the farce Les Dominos roses by Alfred Hennequin and Alfred Delacour.

The musical was produced by George Grossmith, Jr. and Edward Laurillard and directed by Austen Hurgon. It opened at the Shubert Theatre in New York on December 24, 1914. It then was produced at the Gaiety Theatre in London, opening on April 18, 1915 and running for a very successful 460 performances. Grossmith starred in the piece with Leslie Henson. Grossmith told The New York Times that the musical was the first Gaiety Theatre Company production presented in New York before opening in London.

== Roles and original cast ==
Act I ensemble in To-Night's the Night

- Montagu Lovitt-Lovitt – James Blakeley
- Henry (His Nephew) – Leslie Henson
- Pedro (A Tango Teacher) – Max Dearly
- Robin Carraway – Vernon Davidson
- Alphonse (Head Waiter at Covent Garden) – Robert Nainby
- Albert – Victor Gouriet
- Lord Ridgemount – Stanley Brightman
- Policeman – Forest Smith
- The Hon. Dudley Mitten – George Grossmith, Jr.
- June – Haidée de Rance
- Beatrice Carraway (Robin's Wife) – Julia James
- Victoria (Her Maid) – Moya Mannering
- Daisy De Menthe (Of the Piccadilly Theatre) – Madge Saunders
- Angela Lovitt-Lovitt (Montagu's Wife) – Gladys Homfrey
- Lady Pussy Preston – Peggy Kurton
- Lady Edith Taplow – Barbara Dunbar
- Mimi Skeats – Judith Nelmes
- The Hon. Baby Vereker – Doris Stocker
- Avice Carlton – Elsie Scott
- Yvette La Plage – Adrah Fair
- Attendants at Covent Garden – Dorothy Devere and Vera Davis
- Alice (Maid at Daisy's) – Cynthia Murray

== Musical numbers ==
George Grossmith Jr. as Dudley Mitten

Act I – The Carraway's House at Maidenhead

- No. 1 - Chorus – "Life is very jolly down at Maidenhead"
- No. 2 - Carraway & Chorus – "Hullo! little ladies, now you can't complain, here's your faithful Robin"
- No. 3 - Beatrice, Henry, & Montagu – "No one can afford to be too fussy, prim, and proper"
- No. 4 - June & Pedro – "You foreigners have romantic ways, when merely paying a call"
- No. 5 - Dudley & Chorus – "If by some delightful chance at a dinner or a dance some delicious girl you meet"
- No. 6 - Victoria, Henry, & Pedro – "You're looking very sweet, can't we arrange to meet somewhere by and by?"
- No. 7 - Montagu & Girls – "I never had such a rotten time in all my blessed life"
- No. 8 - June & Dudley – "Got the cutest little way, like to watch you all the day"
- No. 9 - Finale Act I – "Tonight's the night of the new revue which ev'ryone should see"

Act II – Scene 1 – Foyer of the Boxes, Royal Opera House

- No. 10 - Chorus – "Oh, the Mannequin, Mannequin, Mannequin, Mannequin Ball!"
- No. 11 - June & Chorus – "I know a man (he lived across the street) who once composed a real good"
- No. 12 - Victoria – "I'm rather fond of someone who's very fond of me"
- No. 13 - Pedro & Chorus – "I'm a very contented chap, bright and gay, tout à fait"
- No. 14 - Beatrice & Dudley – "Once there was one little pair of boots"
- No. 15 - Dudley, Carraway, Henry & Pedro – "Nowadays we're told not to be so lazy"

Act I – Scene 2 – Covent Garden Market

Act II – Scene 3 – Daisy's Flat in Mount Street

- No. 16 - Waltz Song – June & Chorus – "It's long after twelve, time that the moon went home to bed"
- No. 17 - Dudley & Chorus – "Why people rave about wonderful nights is one thing I never could see"

Addenda:

- No. 18 - Pedro – "If from your window you just take a peep, on a warm sunny day"
- No. 19 - Henry – "I once made Mama a promise I would never flirt again"

== See also ==
- Les Dominos roses (1876 play)
- The Pink Dominos (1877 adaptation)
- Der Opernball (1898 operetta)
