= Bébé (play) =

Three-act comedy by the playwrights Émile de Najac and Alfred Hennequin

1877 poster featuring Saint-Germain (centre) as Pétillon

Bébé (Baby) is a three-act comedy by the playwrights Émile de Najac and Alfred Hennequin, first performed in Paris in 1877. It depicts the amorous affairs of an indulged scion of the aristocracy, encouraged by his eccentric tutor.

The play opened at the Théâtre du Gymnase on 10 March 1877, and ran for 214 performances. English versions, heavily bowdlerised, were presented in New York in 1877 and London in 1879.

== Background and first production ==
By the 1870s Émile de Najac and Alfred Hennequin were established writers for the Parisian stage. Both were used to writing in partnership with co-authors, but this was the first time they worked together. Hennequin had recently enjoyed two considerable successes with Le Procès Veauradieux (1875) and Les Dominos roses (1876), both written with Alfred Delacour. Bébé was presented at the Théâtre du Gymnase on 10 March 1877, and ran for 214 performances, a considerable run at a time when a run of 100 performances was regarded as a success for a Parisian theatre.

=== Original cast ===
- Le Baron d'Aigreville – Émile Francès
- Gaston, his son – Frédéric Achard
- De Kernanigous – Alexandre Joseph Landrol
- Pétillon – Saint-Germain
- Arthur de Beauvert – Corbin
- Coiffeur – Revel
- La Baronne d'Aigreville – Mme Bode
- Diane de Kernanigous – Eugénie Worms
- Aurélie de Villecouteuse – Mme Lebon
- Toinette – Mlle Dinelli
- Rosita – Mlle Giesz

There were cast changes during the run. After eighty performances, Mme Prioleau took over the role of the Baronne and Mme Délia that of Diane. In August 1877 Saint-Germain, reported to be "so fatigued by his one hundred and sixty consecutive representations of Pétillon" handed the part over to his colleague M. Bernès.

== Plot ==
Gaston is a genial, strapping young man of twenty-two, but he is still called "Bébé" by his doting parents, Baron d'Aigreville and his wife. Gaston has been indulged all his life, and in consequence is ill-educated and amoral. The Baronne views him through the eye of love as a paragon of perfection, a model of virtue and innocence. He is engaged to be married to Mathilde, a rich heiress, whose guardian, a country cousin named Kernanigous, has just arrived in Paris with his wife, Diane. Usually Kernanigous' trips to Paris are unaccompanied, so that he can visit the cocotte Aurélie de Villecouteuse. When he hears Gaston's mother boasting of the perfect purity of her son, he cannot restrain himself from declaring that in his opinion no man can be a good husband unless he has sown his wild oats before marriage. In Kernanigous's view, before marrying, a young man should have been on intimate terms with three distinct categories of the opposite sex: chambermaids, demi-mondaines and married women.

Saint-Germain as Pétillon

Unknown to his adoring mother, Gaston has already attended to the first two of the items on Kernanigous' list – having slept with his mother's maid, Toinette, and moved on to Aurélie de Villecouteuse – and he is looking forward to engaging in the third. Kernanigous' attractive wife Diane seems to him an ideal subject. She, having discovered her husband's relationship with Amélie, is disposed to take her revenge by a liaison with Gaston.

Gaston and a friend are being coached for the legal profession by an eccentric tutor called Pétillon. When he should be lecturing, he encourages his students and their girlfriends to dance a cancan of the wildest kind. The Baron suddenly makes an appearance to demand what is the meaning of the music. The women are bundled out of sight and Pétillon convinces the Baron that he has discovered "une méthode mnémotechnique", an infallible way of cramming legal facts into the heads of his students: he has set the legal code to music, and he gives the Baron an example, singing some dry legal dictums to the tunes of popular songs.

Gaston's exploits lead to a frantic farcical sequence in Hennequin's customary manner: the characters rush in and out, hide, and are mistaken for others. Finally it turns out that Aurélie is Pétillon's estranged wife, and he is delighted to find that her infidelities mean that he can discontinue his ruinous maintenance payments to her. The Baron reproaches his erring son when the latter's affairs are revealed, but Gaston successfully bids his father remember his own misspent youth, and all is forgiven. Kernanigous gives his consent to Gaston's marriage with Mathilde.

== Reception ==
Les Annales du théâtre et de la musique noted the enthusiastic reception, and welcomed a real success for the Gymnase after a prolonged series of failures. (Note: In the first two months of 1877 the Gymnase had presented 25 different plays, few of them running more than a few nights.) The Paris correspondent of the London theatrical paper The Era wrote that the play "deserves a niche in the Panthéon of dramatic works alongside those already assigned to the Procès Veauradieux and the Dominos Roses, as one of the most laughter-provoking pieces ever placed on the stage". The critic singled out the character Pétillon as "one of those original characters which any author might be proud to have called into being".

== Revivals and adaptations ==
Poster for London production, titled Betsy, 1879

The play was revived at the Théâtre du Palais-Royal in 1892, with Saint-Germain reprising his role of Pétillon. In 1898 Bébé was produced at the Théâtre Montparnasse in i1898. Other revivals in the twenty years after the premiere included productions at the Théâtre du Vaudeville and the Théâtre de Cluny. For Les Annales du théâtre et de la musique the scene in which Pétillon sings extracts from the legal code remained "surely one of the most hilarious inventions that can be seen. So, once again we had a lot of fun".

In the US, Baby, by Thomas B. Macdonough, opened on Broadway in July 1877, starring W. J. Le Moyne as the tutor. The New York Times found the play amusing, but suspected that "the process of adaptation, while it may have brought much of the language of the original within the bounds of propriety, has weakened both the characters and the dialogue".

A German version was premiered in Vienna in early 1878. The Vienna correspondent of The Theatre reported that the play "was very favourably received by an audience who seemed to feel no moral scruples, but to enjoy the piece thoroughly".

The first attempt to produce a version for the London stage was banned by the official censor, the Lord Chamberlain. A second version, by F. C. Burnand, with the title Betsy (Note: Toinette, the maid, became Betsy in Burnand's version.) was licensed and opened at the Criterion Theatre in August 1879. Lottie Venne played the title role, Lytton Sothern the son of the family and Alfred Maltby the tutor. The reviewers in The Era and The Times both felt that some of the fun of the original French version had been lost along with the discarded risqué elements, but the piece ran exceptionally well, achieving 404 performances.

== Notes, references and sources ==
=== Sources ===
- Gaye, Freda, ed. (1967). Who's Who in the Theatre (fourteenth ed.). London: Sir Isaac Pitman and Sons. OCLC 5997224.
- Noël, Edouard; Edmond Stoullig (1878). Les Annales du théâtre et de la musique, 1877. Paris: Charpentier. OCLC 172996346.
- Stoullig, Edmond (1899). Les Annales du théâtre et de la musique, 1898. Paris: Ollendorff. OCLC 172996346.
