= Charles Wyndham (actor) =

English actor and theatre proprietor (1837–1919)

Wyndham, circa 1900

Sir Charles Wyndham (né Culverwell; 23 March 1837 – 12 January 1919) was an English actor and theatre proprietor. Wyndham's Theatre in London is named after him, and he also built the New Theatre (now the Noël Coward Theatre) nearby.

Wyndham's family intended him for a medical career, and he studied medicine while enthusiastically engaging in amateur theatricals in his spare time. Torn between medicine and the stage, he spent three years in the US as a surgeon in the Union army in the American Civil War and on two occasions acted unsuccessfully on the New York stage. After returning to Britain and establishing himself as an actor he made further trips to the US between 1882 and 1910, playing in theatres all around the country.

In London, Wyndham became known for his comic skills, both in light comedy and farce. He took over the management of the Criterion Theatre in 1876 and remained in charge there for more than 20 years. "Criterion farce" became a familiar feature of the West End theatre, usually risqué French pieces toned down to avoid shocking the Victorian British audience. Later, Wyndham was known for his appearances in period costume dramas, most of all T. W. Robertson's David Garrick, which he revived frequently. Among the authors who wrote for him were W. S. Gilbert, F. C. Burnand and Henry Arthur Jones. Oscar Wilde wrote The Importance of Being Earnest with Wyndham in mind, but circumstances prevented him from playing in it.

Wyndham commissioned two London theatres, both designed by W. G. R. Sprague: Wyndham's, opened in 1899, and the New, which opened four years later. He retired in 1913, and died at his London house in 1919, aged 81.

== Life and career ==
=== Early years ===
Wyndham as a teenager

Wyndham was born in Liverpool on 23 March 1837, the second son of Major Richard Culverwell (c. 1820–1860) and his wife, Jane née Lloyd. He had one brother, who did not survive childhood, and three sisters. Biographies published in Wyndham's lifetime state that Culverwell was a doctor, but in the Oxford Dictionary of National Biography (2011) Michael Read writes:

His father's first name suggested military rank, but Major Culverwell had no connection with the army: he and his son claimed for him the profession of physician, but he does not appear to have possessed a British medical qualification, and in the directories he was variously described as watchmaker, hotelier, and victualler. The truth is in doubt.

Wyndham went to boarding-schools in England, Scotland, Germany and France. In Scotland he acquired the taste for amateur theatricals, and in Paris he frequented the Comédie-Française and the Théâtre du Palais-Royal. The former was known for its classical style and the latter had a long tradition of farce; both were a formative influence on his acting. He studied medicine at King's College, London, and at the College of Surgeons and the Peter Street Anatomical School in Dublin, and despite the counter-attractions of amateur acting and theatre-going he qualified as MRCS in 1857 and took his Doctor of Medicine degree at the University of Giessen in 1859. In 1860 he married Emma Silberrad (c. 1837–1916), a member of a German family that was both aristocratic and affluent. Read comments, "By marrying into this house of merchant princes Wyndham was spared the fear of destitution that plagued other actors".

In February 1862 Wyndham, who had by then adopted his stage surname, (Note: In October 1886 he legally took the surname by deed poll.) made his professional debut at the Royalty Theatre as the juvenile lead opposite the young, but already experienced, Ellen Terry. Her acting was praised; his was not. At the time, it was the practice of some London theatre managers to engage amateurs to appear in prominent roles in otherwise professional companies, and The Examiner took Wyndham for such an amateur. He remained in the Royalty's company for six months, and after his inauspicious debut he began to attract excellent reviews. In the farce Grandfather Whitehead he won praise from the theatrical newspaper The Era, which found him "a very promising Light Comedian" and his playing "as easy, natural and perfect as it need be". In a later review during the season The Era said:

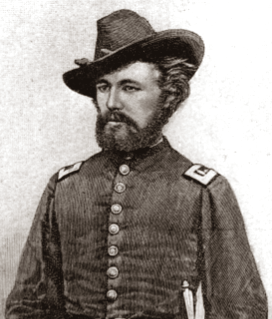
As a military surgeon in the American Civil War

We have before taken occasion to speak favourably of the acting of Mr Charles Wyndham, and almost in every instance in which that gentleman essays a part, he achieves it satisfactorily. He may, in all fairness, be termed a rising Actor, and if he but continues to add care to his admitted ability and acknowledged zeal, he can hardly fail to occupy a notable position.

Still undecided between a theatrical and medical career, but too adventurous in spirit to relish the idea of becoming a family doctor, Wyndham travelled to the US later in 1862, determined to become a medical officer in the Union army in the American Civil War. The military authorities hesitated to sign him up, but he successfully persisted and served until the war was nearly over. (Note: By some accounts Wyndham was present at the battles of Fredericksburg, Chancellorsville and Gettysburg, before going through the Red River Campaign under General Banks, but research reported by the American Civil War Round Table indicates that his military career was centred on St Louis, Fort Schuyler, Port Hudson (after the siege) and Beverly, New Jersey.) During breaks from his military service he made two unsuccessful appearances on the stage in New York, first in a company led by John Wilkes Booth (later the assassin of Abraham Lincoln), and then in Mrs John Wood's troupe.

=== Professional advance, 1865–1873 ===
In 1865 Wyndham returned to England. He resumed his British stage career in a leading role in a play he had written, My Lady's Guardian, which opened at the Theatre Royal, Manchester in July. The local correspondent of The Era was moderately complimentary about the play and said that Wyndham "possesses innate talent as a light comedian". When Wyndham took the production to Liverpool the same paper described him as "one of the most accomplished actors we have seen for a long time". His success in this and other provincial productions enabled him to gain a West End engagement the following year.

Wyndham joined the company of the Royalty in May 1866 under the management of Patty Oliver. He played Sir Arthur Lascelles in Maddison Morton's well-known play, All That Glitters Is Not Gold, given as a supporting piece to a new extravaganza. Of his later roles during the season, the most prominent was as the smuggler, Hatchett, in F. C. Burnand's new and immensely popular burlesque on Douglas Jerrold's nautical comedy, Black-Eyed Susan, with Oliver and Nelly Bromley. Burnand was impressed by Wyndham – his dancing as much as his acting.

Dearer Than Life, 1868: l to r, standing: Everard, Wyndham, Dyas, John Clayton and Hodson; and sitting: Toole, Brough and Irving

In 1867 Wyndham joined the company at the St James's Theatre, where he acted with Henry Irving for the first time. In September and October of the same year he appeared at the Prince's Theatre, Manchester, in Kate Terry's farewell season, in which his roles included Mercutio in Romeo and Juliet, Claudio in Much Ado About Nothing, the clown Modus in James Sheridan Knowles's The Hunchback, and Laertes in Hamlet. Before returning to the West End, he went to his home town, Liverpool, to create the role of Roberto in W. S. Gilbert's extravaganza La Vivandière. The Liverpool Mercury said, "In acting, singing and dancing he fairly carried the audience with him".

Returning to London, Wyndham was then engaged for the Queen's Theatre, Long Acre, and there in October and November 1867 – as the gallant Dujardin in The Double Marriage and the seducer Hawksley in Still Waters Run Deep – he once again partnered Ellen Terry. The company at the Queen's also included Irving, J. L. Toole, Lionel Brough, Henrietta Hodson, Harriett Everard and Ada Dyas, who all appeared with Wyndham in January 1868 in H. J. Byron's Dearer Than Life, given in a double bill with the London production of La Vivandière, in which Wyndham's former role was played by Brough.

In 1868 Wyndham made his first venture into management, when he took the Princess's Theatre, presenting a season of three plays, but the undertaking was not successful. He returned to the US and appeared at Wallack's Theatre in 1869, playing Charles Surface in The School for Scandal, a role he made particularly his own. After several more New York productions, and having established a reputation as a light comedian, he started an American touring company of his own, opening with The Lancers (Note: A comedy by Leicester Vernon, adapted from Le Fils de famille, a comédie en vaudevilles, by Jean-François Bayard and Edmond de Biéville.) in Washington DC in March 1871. He continued to tour all over the US until 1873, with a repertory of 20 plays, mostly comedies. (Note: The plays were Caste, The Debutante, Divorce, Friends, The Happy Pair, Home, Jenny Lind, The Lancers, London Assurance, The Marble Heart, Mephisto's Mission, Milky White, Ours, Progress, Rocks Ahead, Saratoga, School, The Serious Family, The Veteran and Woodcock's Little Game.)

=== Farce and the Criterion, 1873–1881 ===
The Pink Dominos, 1877

Wyndham returned to England in 1873 and appeared for various managements including the Bancrofts, in new plays and revivals of classics (as Jack Rover in Wild Oats and Charles Surface again). At the Court Theatre in May 1874, he played Bob Sackett in a new farce, Brighton; (Note: Brighton, by Frank Marshall, was based on an American comedy, Saratoga, by Bronson Howard (who later married one of Wyndham's sisters). Wyndham had presented the original during his US tour in 1871–1873. Marshall and Wyndham freely acknowledged Howard's play as the basis of Brighton, but Howard was irritated that some laudatory reviews in the British press made no mention of him.) Who's Who in the Theatre records, "his success in that play was very great, and the play remained a trump card in his repertory for many years". The Times later described the play as "the founder of his fortunes, [which] set him off upon a theatrical course in which he was unrivalled".

In September 1874 Wyndham inaugurated a series of matinées at the Crystal Palace in which, over three years, he presented nearly a hundred plays, and acted in many of them, in roles including Bassanio in The Merchant of Venice, and Mephistopheles in Faust and Marguerite; he staged but did not appear in Sophocles' Antigone and Oedipus at Colonus.

Wyndham made his first appearance at the Criterion Theatre, in December 1875 in Brighton, and the following year he took over the management of that theatre, which he retained for more than 20 years. The Times described the Criterion under Wyndham as "the home of farce and Wyndham its unequalled performer and stage manager". (Note: In the 19th century, the term "stage-manager" covered the artistic functions now ascribed to directors as well as the purely technical aspects of staging to which "stage-manager" has subsequently come to be restricted.) Many of the plays he presented were adaptations from the French, in which the precision and speed of the Palais-Royal productions of his youth were a considerable influence on his staging. Some Palais-Royal material required judicious modification for a respectable English audience of the 1870s, but The Times said, "His grace and vivacity were enchanting, and his lightness of touch relieved liveliness of offence". Read writes:

In "Criterion farce", translated from French originals with names and places Anglicized, faithless husbands and suitors were seen in the most favourable light. Men in the audience smirked approvingly, and women swooned. No one was ever more able than Wyndham to commend the transgressor. He moved about the stage with perfect ease; every gesture had been rehearsed in a mirror ... His wonderful naturalness was his greatest legacy to the next generation of actors.

Wyndham did not always play in his own productions; he starred in James Albery's The Pink Dominos (1877, 555 performances) (Note: A characteristic example of a Criterion farce adapted from the French: The Pink Dominos is an Anglicised version of Les Dominos roses by Alfred Delacour and Alfred Hennequin, premiered in April 1876 at the Théâtre du Vaudeville, Paris, where it ran for 127 performances.) but did not appear in Burnand's Betsy (1879, 408 performances). (Note: Another piece based on a French play – Bébé, by Hennequin and Émile de Najac, which ran for 214 performances at the Théâtre du Gymnase in 1877. Burnand had to tone down the risqué French original considerably for his English audience.) A rare failure was Gilbert's farce Foggerty's Fairy (1881), in which Wyndham appeared with his former employer, Mrs John Wood; it opened on 15 December and closed on 6 January. (Note: Nevertheless, Wyndham's performance was praised.)

=== Costume drama, 1882–1899 ===
With his future wife, Mary Moore, in She Stoops to Conquer, 1890

In 1882 Wyndham again visited the United States, where he remained for eighteen months. His Criterion company was the first English troupe to reach America's west coast. On his return to London he successfully continued with modern-dress farce for some years, before turning to period pieces, first in a revival of Wild Oats in May 1886, and later in the same year in T. W. Robertson's David Garrick, a piece with which he became closely associated, playing the title role hundreds of times, including a production in German (in his own translation) which he toured in Europe in 1888, appearing in St Petersburg before Tsar Alexander III and his court.

David Garrick remained Wyndham's principal period-costume role, but he presented several more over the next decade, including Dion Boucicault's London Assurance (as Dazzle, 1890), and 18th-century comedies by Goldsmith, Sheridan, and O'Keeffe. Despite his considerable success in these plays, Read writes that many thought his finest achievement of all was "the portrayal of mellow, titled men of the world, cynical but tender", in plays written for him by Henry Arthur Jones: Lord Clivebrook in The Bauble Shop (1893), Sir Richard Kato QC in The Case of Rebellious Susan (1894), Dr Carey in The Physician (1897), Colonel Sir Christopher Deering in The Liars (1897) and Sir Daniel Carteret in Mrs Dane's Defence (1900).

Wyndham missed the chance to create one of Oscar Wilde's leading roles. Wilde modelled John Worthing in The Importance of Being Earnest on Wyndham's stage persona, and Wyndham accepted the play for production. Before it could be put into rehearsal, his fellow actor-manager George Alexander had a sudden crisis when a production failed and he had no play with which to follow it. At Wilde's request, Wyndham released the rights, and Alexander staged The Importance in February 1895. Wilde promised his next play to Wyndham, but that did not materialise, as later in 1895 Wilde was disgraced and imprisoned, and his career came to an end.

In 1897 Wyndham separated from his wife. His partner for the rest of his life was the actress Mary Moore, widow of James Albery; she had become Wyndham's leading lady, in 1885, and his business partner in 1896. In November 1899 Wyndham opened a new theatre, to which he gave his name, in Charing Cross Road. Wyndham's Theatre, designed by W. G. R. Sprague, had a deeper and wider stage than the Criterion, and the auditorium had a 20 per cent larger capacity. Wyndham opened his new theatre with a revival of David Garrick, donating the first night's takings of £4,000 to charity.

=== Later years, 1900–1919 ===
In April 1900 Wyndham played the title role in Edmond Rostand's Cyrano de Bergerac. Read suggests that lack of early experience in provincial repertory had left Wyndham technically struggling with a part so different from his usual roles, but the reviews were friendly, and it was the play that did not attract audiences. He reverted to his recognised speciality, modern-dress comedy.

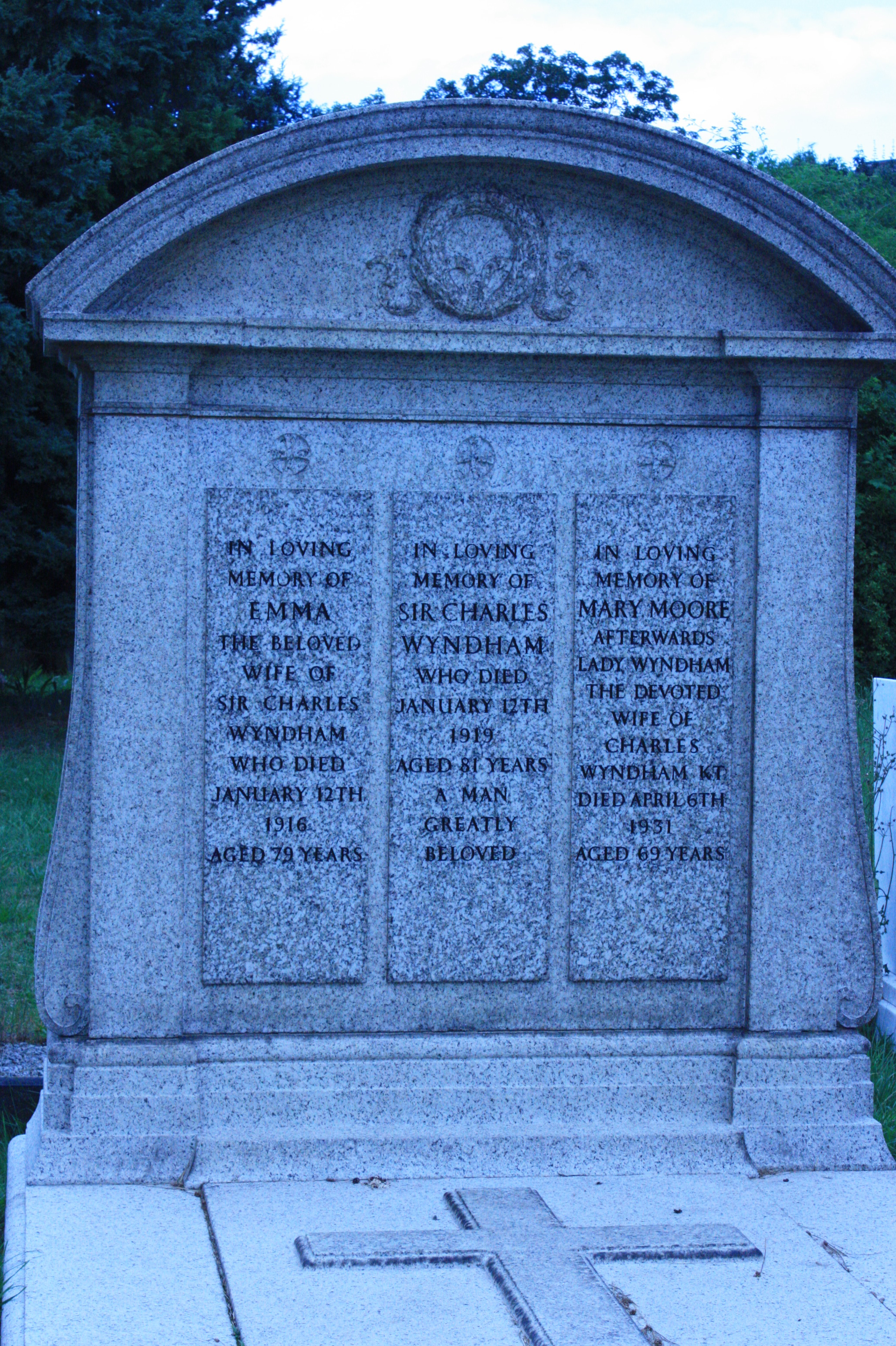
Wyndham's grave in Hampstead Cemetery

In the 1902 Coronation Honours Wyndham was knighted. In 1903 he opened another theatre, the New (later called the Albery, and since 2006 the Noël Coward Theatre), in St Martin's Lane, backing onto Wyndham's. In the same year, he and his company appeared before Edward VII and his court at Windsor Castle, in David Garrick; in a second command performance at Windsor, in 1907, Wyndham played John Mildmay in Taylor's Still Waters Run Deep, in which he had first played (in another role) at the Queen's forty years earlier. He continued to act in the US, appearing there in 1904, 1909, and 1910. His memory began to fail, and in 1913 he retired, after a final run of David Garrick. In 1916 his estranged wife died, and he married Mary Moore.

Wyndham died from pneumonia following influenza on 12 January 1919 at his house in York Terrace, Regent's Park, London. He was survived by his second wife and a son (Howard Wyndham, who was also a theatre manager) and a daughter from his first marriage. He was buried on 16 January at Hampstead Cemetery, and a memorial service was held at St Martin-in-the-Fields.

== Notes, references and sources ==
=== Sources ===
- Burnand, F. C. (1905). Records and Reminiscences. London: Methuen. OCLC 1052533797.
- Gaye, Freda, ed. (1967). Who's Who in the Theatre (fourteenth ed.). London: Sir Isaac Pitman and Sons. OCLC 5997224.
- Noël, Edouard; Edmond Stoullig (1877). Les Annales du théâtre et de la musique, 1876. Paris: Charpentier. OCLC 172996346.
- Noël, Edouard; Edmond Stoullig (1878). Les Annales du théâtre et de la musique, 1877. Paris: Charpentier. OCLC 172996346.
- Parker, John; Freda Gaye; et al. (1978). Who Was Who in the Theatre: Volume 4 – Q–Z. Detroit: Gale. OCLC 310466463.
- Pemberton, T. Edgar (1904). Sir Charles Wyndham: A Biography. London: Hutchinson. OCLC 1084942972.
- Shore, Florence Teignmouth (1908). Sir Charles Wyndham. London: Bodley Head. OCLC 1120894484.
- Wilde, Oscar (1962). Rupert Hart-Davis (ed.). The Letters of Oscar Wilde. London: Hart-Davis. OCLC 460734743.
