= Alfred Hennequin =

Belgian dramatist

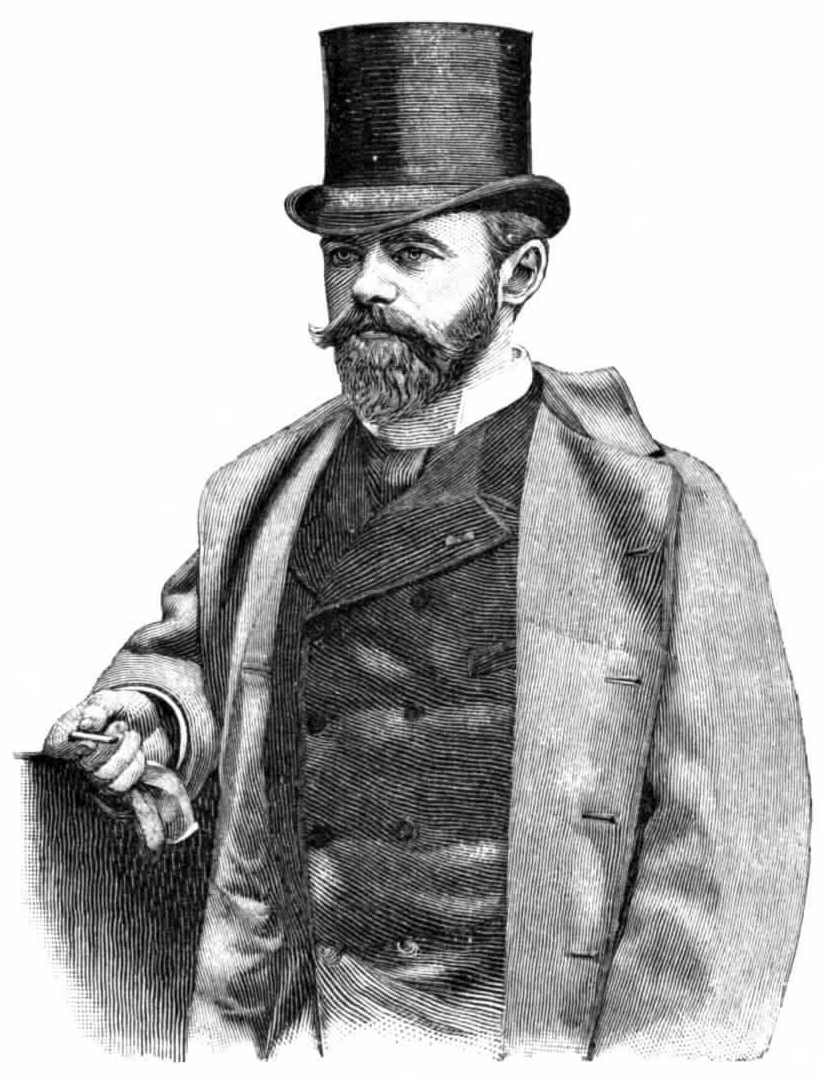
Alfred Hennequin

Alfred Néoclès Hennequin (13 January 1842 – 7 August 1887) was a Belgian playwright, best known for his farces. Born in Liège, Hennequin was trained there as an engineer, and was employed by the national railway company. In his spare time he wrote plays, and in 1870 had a success in Brussels with his farce Les Trois chapeaux (The Three Hats). He moved to Paris in 1871 and became a full-time playwright. Between 1871 and 1886 he wrote a series of comic plays, including Le Procès Veauradieux (The Veauradieux Trial, 1875), Les Dominos roses (The Pink Dominos, 1876), Bébé (Baby, 1877) and La Femme à papa (Father's Wife, 1879). Most of his plays were co-written with collaborators including Alfred Delacour and Albert Millaud and, in his last play, his son Maurice.

Hennequin, with his intricate plotting and frenetic exits and entrances through various doors, is known as the originator of the bedroom farce and a model for a later master of the genre, Georges Feydeau. In addition to his farces, Hennequin wrote some of the last of the old genre of musical vaudevilles, in collaboration with composers including Hervé and Raoul Pugno. Many of his farces were successfully staged in English versions, usually with the bedroom element toned down for British and American audiences.

In the mid 1880s Hennequin suffered increasingly serious mental illness, and in March 1886 he entered a nursing home. He died the following year at Épinay-sur-Seine at the age of 45.

== Life and career ==
=== Early years ===
Alfred Néoclès Hennequin was born in Liège on 13 January 1842. He studied at the École des mines de Liege, and began his working career as an engineer for the Belgian State Railways. In his spare time he wrote plays under a pen name. A two-act comedy, J'attends mon oncle (I'm Waiting for My Uncle) was produced at the Théâtre Royal des Galeries in Brussels in 1869. The following year the same theatre presented his three-act comedy Les Trois chapeaux (The Three Hats), which Le Figaro described as "a play of astonishing comic verve".

Hennequin moved to Paris, where Les Trois chapeaux was produced at the Théâtre du Vaudeville in 1871. There was a brief controversy before the first night: Hennequin, as a Belgian, was accused of having been insufficiently pro-French and anti-German during the recent Franco-Prussian War, but the accusation was quickly withdrawn. The premiere went well. The critic Jules Prével wrote that the audience laughed as much as the excessively hot weather allowed, and "Besides, M. Hennequin's play is funny … a misplaced hat, running from hand to hand, fluttering from head to head, produces quiproquos (Note: In French theatrical usage a quiproquo is one character being mistaken for another, a key device of farce.) that are pretty comical, but too long to detail." The main roles were in the expert hands of star members of the Vaudeville company: Auguste Parade, Léopold Delannoy and Saint-Germain, and the piece was a success.

=== 1875–1878 ===
Bébé, 1877

Hennequin had other comedies ready, but, as Le Figaro later commented, "in Paris, the difficulty is not writing amusing plays – it is getting them played". Hennequin's next success was not until June 1875. He collaborated with Alfred Delacour on a three-act farce, Le Procès Veauradieux (The Veauradieux Trial). The Vaudeville was officially closed for the customary summer break, and Paris was in the middle of a heatwave, but the members of the theatre's company decided to stage the play regardless of their management. The authors of Les Annales du théâtre et de la musique wrote:

It is a long time since we laughed so much and so heartily at the Vaudeville. Everyone looked at each other astonished. You couldn't believe your ears. Everyone had arrived at the theatre without enthusiasm and resigned to spending a boring evening. Not at all: this play … begins with a huge burst of laughter, and as the scenes follow one another and the evening progresses, the laughter crescendos to become almost universal … a great, complete success … We laughed during the show. We were laughing when we came out. And we will laugh at it for a long time.

In Le Figaro Auguste Vitu wrote, "M. Delacour and M. Hennequin won the Veauradieux Trial, with interest, damages and costs; we laughed for two hours, laughed as in the good old days of the Vaudeville, as at the best evenings of the Palais-Royal, (Note: The Théâtre du Palais-Royal had a long tradition of comedy in general and farce in particular.) we laughed like a herd of madmen". The play ran for 175 performances and established Hennequin's reputation.

The following year Hennequin and Delacour had another success at the Vaudeville with Les Dominos roses (The Pink Dominos), described by Le Figaro as "the triumph of the imbroglio", and by the London theatrical paper The Era as "a triumph" tout court. It ran for 127 performances, and was followed by Bébé (1877, with Émile de Najac) at the Théâtre du Gymnase (214 performances), Le Phoque (The Seal, 1878, with Delacour) at the Théâtre du Palais-Royal and La Poudre d'escampette (The Quick Getaway, with Henri Bocage) at the Théâtre des Variétés.

=== Last years ===
Niniche, 1878

The following years saw the appearance of La Petite correspondance, at the Gymnasium, Le Renard bleu, at the Palais-Royal, and then the series of plays written for Anna Judic, in collaboration with Albert Millaud – Niniche, La Femme à Papa and Lili, which, Le Figaro commented, raised the fortunes of the Variétés to a point they had not reached before.

Although Hennequin is credited with creating what became the familiar genre of French farce, he also worked within the older tradition of vaudeville – a genre that originated in the Middle Ages as a satirical song, evolved into a play in verse with music, and by the late 19th century was splitting into two branches: opérettes, such as those by Offenbach, and, in the words of the writer Peter Meyer, "the vaudeville itself ... akin to what we would call slapstick farce, where movement was more important than character". Some of Hennequin's works, such as Niniche (1878), La Femme à papa (1879) and Lili (1882), with music by composers such as Raoul Pugno and Hervé were among the last of the old genre of musical vaudeville. In his non-musical works, Hennequin perfected the intricate plotting that later served as a model for Georges Feydeau. The writer Leonard Pronko describes Hennequin's plots as "endless mazes of crisscrossing couples, scurrying from door to door, room to room in every possible and impossible combination". For his innovative skill in this regard, Hennequin became known as "the father of the farce".

Hennequin worked constantly, and by the early 1880s he was showing signs of mental strain. His condition grew worse, and in March 1886 he went into a nursing home in Saint-Mande. He died a few months later at another nursing home Épinay-sur-Seine, on 7 August 1887 at the age of 45. His body was found in the garden of the home, and suicide was at first suspected, but he had been in good spirits and it was concluded that he had accidentally fallen out of the window of his room.

== Plays by Hennequin ==
Year	Title	English translation	Described as	Collaborator	Theatre
1871	Les Trois chapeaux	The Three Hats	comédie in 3 acts	—	Théâtre des Galeries, Brussels; Vaudeville, Paris
1873	Aline		pièce in one act, in verse	Armand Silvestre	Vaudeville
1875	Le Procès Veauradieux	The Veauradieux Trial	comédie in 3 acts	Alfred Delacour	Vaudeville
1876	Poste restante		comédie-vaudeville in 4 acts	Delacour	Palais-Royal
1876	Les Dominos roses	The Pink Dominos	comédie in 3 acts	Delacour	Vaudeville
1877	Bébé		comédie in 3 acts	Émile de Najac	Gymnase
1877	La Poudre d'escampette	The Quick Getaway	folie-vaudeville in 3 acts	Henri Bocage	Variétés
1877	Le Phoque	The Seal	comédie in 3 acts	Delacour	Palais-Royal
1878	Le Renard bleu	The Blue Fox	comédie in one act	—	Palais-Royal
1878	Niniche		comédie-vaudeville in 3 acts	Albert Millaud (words); Marius Boullard (music)	Variétés
1878	La Petite correspondance	The Little Correspondence	comédie in 3 acts	de Najac	Gymnase
1879	La Femme à papa	Father's wife	comédie-opérette in 3 acts	Albert Millaud (words); Hervé (music)	Variétés
1879	Nounou		comédie in 4 acts	de Najac	Gymnase
1880	La Corbeille de noces	The Wedding Basket	comédie in 3 acts	Bocage	Palais-Royal
1881	La Vente à Tata	The Sale to Auntie	vaudeville in 3 acts	Albert Wolff	Nouveautés
1882	Lili		comédie-vaudeville in 3 acts	Albert Millaud and Ernest Blum	Variétés
1882	Ninetta		opéra comique	Adolphe Brisson (words); Raoul Pugno (music)	Renaissance
1884	Le Train de plaisir	The Pleasure Train	comédie in 4 acts	Arnold Mortier and Albert de Saint-Albin	Palais-Royal
1884	Le Présomptif	The Heir	opéra-bouffe in 3 acts	Albin Valabrègue (words); Louis Gregh (music)	Renaissance
1884	Les Trois Devins	The Three Soothsayers	opérette in 3 acts	Valabrègue (words); Édouard Okolowicz (music)	Ambigu
1885	Cherchez la femme		comédie in 3 acts	de Najac	Vaudeville
1885	L'étudiant pauvre	The Poor Student	opérette in 3 acts	Albin Valabrègue (words) and Carl Millöcker (music)	Brussels, Théâtre des Menus Plaisirs
1886	Trop de vertu!	Too Much Virtue	pièce in 3 acts	Maurice Hennequin	Palais-Royal

== Revivals and adaptations ==
After the author's death his works were revived from time to time. Among other Parisian productions, La Femme à Papa was given at the Variétés in 1895, Nounou at the Dézajet in 1899, Bébé at the Vaudeville in 1901, and Niniche at the Variétés in the same year.

Les Dominos roses as The Pink Dominos in London

On Broadway there were several production of Hennequin's plays during his lifetime and into the early 20th century. Baby (1877 and 1878) was based on Bébé; The Pink Dominos (1877) on Les Dominos roses, The Great Divorce Case (1883) on Le Procès Veauradieux and Before and After (1905–06) on La Poudre de l'escampette. In 1912, The Opera Ball, a musical version of Les Dominos roses, was given.

In the West End adaptations included two different versions of Les Trois chapeaux; and Niniche appeared as Boulogne by F. C. Burnand in 1879, a previous English version having been banned by the censor. At the Criterion Theatre, Charles Wyndham and his company made a speciality of French farces, including Hennequin's Le Procès Veauradieux, Les Dominos roses, Bébé and La Femme à papa, as The Great Divorce Case (1876), The Pink Dominos (1877), Betsey (1879) and Little Miss Muffet (1882), the second and third of these running for 555 and 408 performances respectively: very considerable runs for the period. In the 21st century the Orange Tree Theatre in Richmond, London revived Le Procès Veauradieux under the title Once Bitten in 2010.

Adaptations for the cinema include Bébé, directed by Georges Monca and Charles Prince (France, 1914, short film, based on Bébé); La Femme à papa, directed by Georges Monca and Charles Prince (France, 1914, short film, based on La Femme à papa); Lili, directed by Cornelius Hintner (Hungary, 1918, based on Lili); Niniche, directed by Camillo De Riso (Italy, 1918, based on Niniche); Treno di piacere, directed by Luciano Doria (Italy, 1924, based on Le Train de plaisir); Opernball, directed by Géza von Bolváry (Germany, 1939, based on Les Dominos roses); Opernball, directed by Ernst Marischka (Austria, 1956, based on Les Dominos roses).

== Notes, references and sources ==
=== Sources ===
- Charney, Maurice (2005). Comedy: A Geographic and Historical Guide. Westport, Conn. and London: Praeger. ISBN 978-0-313-32706-3.
- Davis, Jessica Milner (2003). Farce. New Brunswick and London: Transaction. ISBN 978-1-4128-2344-9.
- Gaye, Freda, ed. (1967). Who's Who in the Theatre (fourteenth ed.). London: Sir Isaac Pitman and Sons. OCLC 5997224.
- Meyer, Peter (2003). "Introduction". Feydeau. London: Oberon. ISBN 978-1-84943-993-0.
- Noël, Edouard; Edmond Stoullig (1876). Les Annales du théâtre et de la musique, 1875. Paris: Charpentier. OCLC 172996346.
- Noël, Edouard; Edmond Stoullig (1877). Les Annales du théâtre et de la musique, 1876. Paris: Charpentier. OCLC 172996346.
- Pronko, Leonard (1975). Georges Feydeau. New York: Ungar. ISBN 978-0-8044-2700-5.
