= Pink domino =

Pink domino may refer to:

- Pink Domino (short story), a novel by Georgette Heyer
- a mullein (plants in the genus Verbascum) cultivar
- The Pink Dominos, a farce in three acts by James Albery
