= Fanny Josephs =

English actress, singer and theatre manager

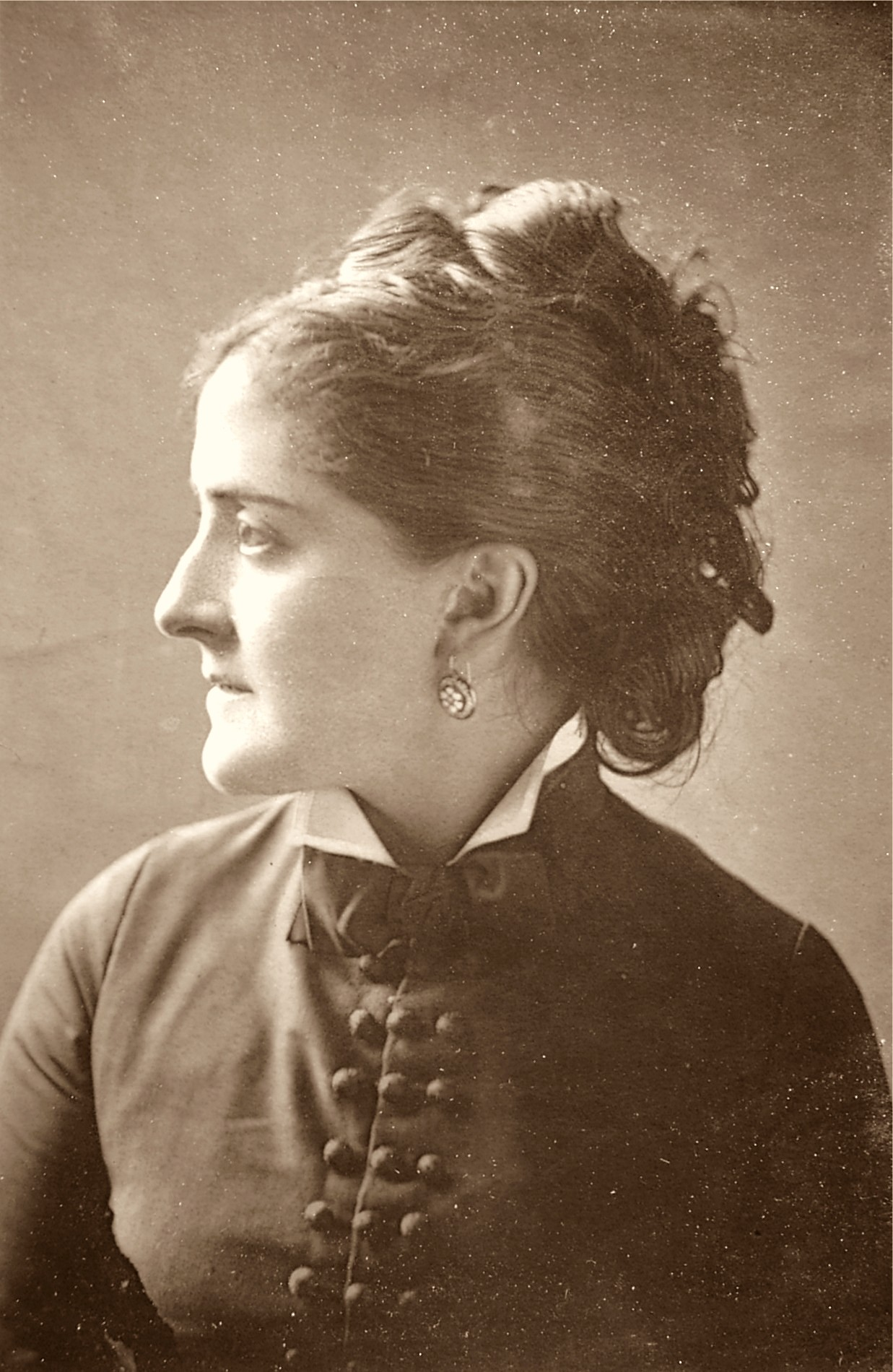
Fanny Josephs

Frances Adeline Josephs (1842–1890) was an English actress, singer and theatre manager. In 1877, she starred in one of the most successful plays of the day, The Pink Dominos, at the Criterion Theatre alongside Charles Wyndham.

== Life ==
Her father held a position at a theatre in Dublin, and under his tutorage she appeared on stage from an early age. Her London debut was in September 1860 at Sadler's Wells Theatre, as Celia in As You Like It. In 1861 she joined the company of the Strand Theatre, and became popular, particularly in burlesque.

In October 1866 on the opening night of the Holborn Theatre, under Sefton Parry's management, she was in the original production of The Flying Scud by Dion Boucicault. In 1868 she became manager of the theatre, and on the opening night presented The Post Boy by H. T. Craven and The White Fawn by F. C. Burnand. In October 1871 at the Globe Theatre. she was in the original production of H. J. Byron's Partners for Life.

In 1873 she joined the company of the Prince of Wales's Theatre; she appeared as Bella in a revival of T. W. Robertson's School, and in a revival of Sheridan's The School for Scandal as Lady Sneerwell. A reviewer wrote:

Special mention should be decidedly reserved for the Lady Sneerwell of Miss Fanny Josephs — a small character, it is true, though what character is small in the hands of an artist? Following the example so frequently and unselfishly set by Mrs Bancroft for so many years. Miss Josephs took the small and, as it is called, ungrateful character, and made her mark. The dancing of Miss Fanny Josephs in the introduced minuet would have astonished the most critical grandmother. One can well believe in the old-fashioned horror of valses and polkas when we see such charming grace and true elegance as this. — The Daily Telegraph, 6 April 1874.

In March 1877 Josephs was in the original production of The Pink Dominos by James Albery at the Criterion Theatre, in the role of Lady Marie Wagstaff, and continued in the role during the run of the play, which ran for 555 performances. In the summer of 1879 she became lessee and manager of the Olympic Theatre; the opening play, The Worship of Bacchus by Paul Meritt and Henry Pettitt, was not successful.
