= The Notorious Mrs. Ebbsmith =

Play by Arthur Wing Pinero

The Notorious Mrs. Ebbsmith is a play by Arthur Wing Pinero. It was first produced on 13 March 1895 at the Garrick Theatre, with Mrs Patrick Campbell playing the lead role of Agnes Ebbsmith. The theme of the play is social radicalism. The title character is a vehement critic of all social conventions, especially marriage, and an advocate of free love.

== Characters and original cast ==
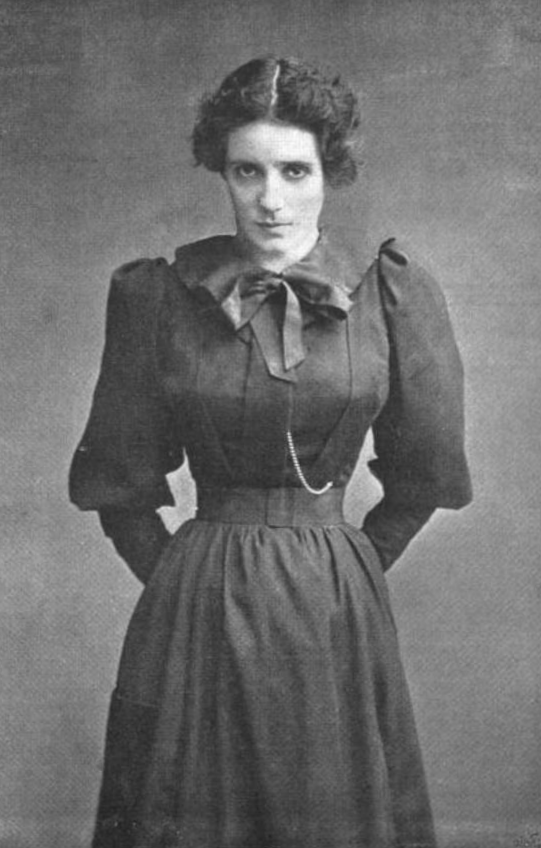
Mrs. Patrick Campbell in the titular role

- The Duke of St Olpherts – John Hare
- Sir Sandford Cleeve – Ian Robertson
- Lucas Cleeve, brother of Sandford Cleeve – Johnston Forbes-Robertson
- The Rev Amos Winterfield, elder brother of Gertrude Thorpe – C. Aubrey Smith
- Sir George Brodrick, a prominent British physician – Joseph Carne
- Dr Kirke, a British physician in Venice – Fred Thorne
- Fortuné, manservant of Lucas – Gerald du Maurier
- Antonio Poppi, servant of Agnes and Lucas – C. F. Caravoglia
- Agnes Ebbsmith – Mrs Patrick Campbell
- Mrs Gertrude Thorpe, a young widow, friend of Agnes – Ellis Jeffreys
- Sybil Cleeve, wife of Lucas – Eleanor Calhoun
- Nella, servant of Agnes and Lucas – Mary Halsey
- Hephzibah, servant of Gertrude and Amos – Mrs Charles Groves

Source: The Era.

== Plot ==
Agnes, a 33-year-old widow, is staying in Venice with Lucas, to whom she is not married, though the servants and her friend Gertrude have assumed so. Lucas was a rising young Conservative politician who abandoned his wife and career for Agnes. They met when she was sent to Italy to nurse him through a bout of malaria contracted in Rome. She had been married unhappily, and after her husband died became a prominent radical lecturer, and then a nurse to earn a living. Lucas was also unhappy in his marriage and they fell in love. Now they (or at least she) envision a future of writing passionate essays against marriage, lecturing and campaigning.

His relatives do not accept his decision. His uncle, the Duke, comes to Venice to "arrange" matters. He suggests a sham reconciliation between Lucas and his wife, and for Agnes, "The suburban villa, the little garden, a couple of discreet servants—everything à la mode." Agnes sneers at this, of course, but is horrified to discover that Lucas actually considers it. She reluctantly agrees.

Gertrude, though shocked by Agnes' open "immorality", has come to appreciate her philosophy. She now urges Agnes to reject this hypocritical arrangement, and instead to come with her and Amos to their home in Yorkshire. Amos also appeals to her, urging her to pray for guidance. Agnes agrees to go with them.

Lucas now rejects the Duke's proposal, and the Duke asks Gertrude and Amos to stop interfering.

Sybil Lucas now appears. She confronts Agnes, and bizarrely asks her to return to Lucas and get him to return to London. She despises Lucas, but she loved him once, and doesn't want to see him "utterly wasted". She implies that her apparent reconciliation with Lucas would relieve her of a great humiliation, even though he made her as miserable as Agnes' husband did her. Agnes breaks down and agrees. However, Gertrude intervenes, fearing that this path will corrupt and destroy Agnes. Sybil breaks down and repudiates the deal.

Lucas makes a last effort to join with Agnes, and resume their "free love" life, but Agnes has had enough; she thought she was a leader, a moral example, who would show the world "how men and woman may live independent and noble lives without rule, guidance or sacrament", but she proved weak and corruptible. She feels that she cannot sit in judgment of Sybil any longer; she will go with Amos and Gertrude; and she urges Lucas to learn to pray.

== Revivals ==
John Hare revived the play at Abbey's Theatre, New York in 1896, with Julia Neilson in the title role. It was not well received – The New York Times called it "smart, ingenious but disliked" – and was quickly replaced by other plays in the repertory of Hare's company. The play was then revived in the West End by Mrs Patrick Campbell (who also reprised her original role), the production opening at London's Royalty Theatre on 27 February 1901.

In 2014 the London-based production company Primavera Productions presented in the second West End revival of the play, at the Jermyn Street Theatre. Rhiannon Sommers played Agnes Ebbsmith and Christopher Ravenscroft played the Duke of St Olpherts, with Max Hutchinson as Lucas Cleeve. Abbey Wright directed the revival. Reviewing the production in The Guardian, Michael Billington described the work as "a flawed but intriguing curiosity" and said "the play is worth reviving if only because it demonstrates Pinero's desire to run with the commercial hare while hunting with the intellectual hounds".
