= Nelly Bromley =

English actor and singer (1850–1939)

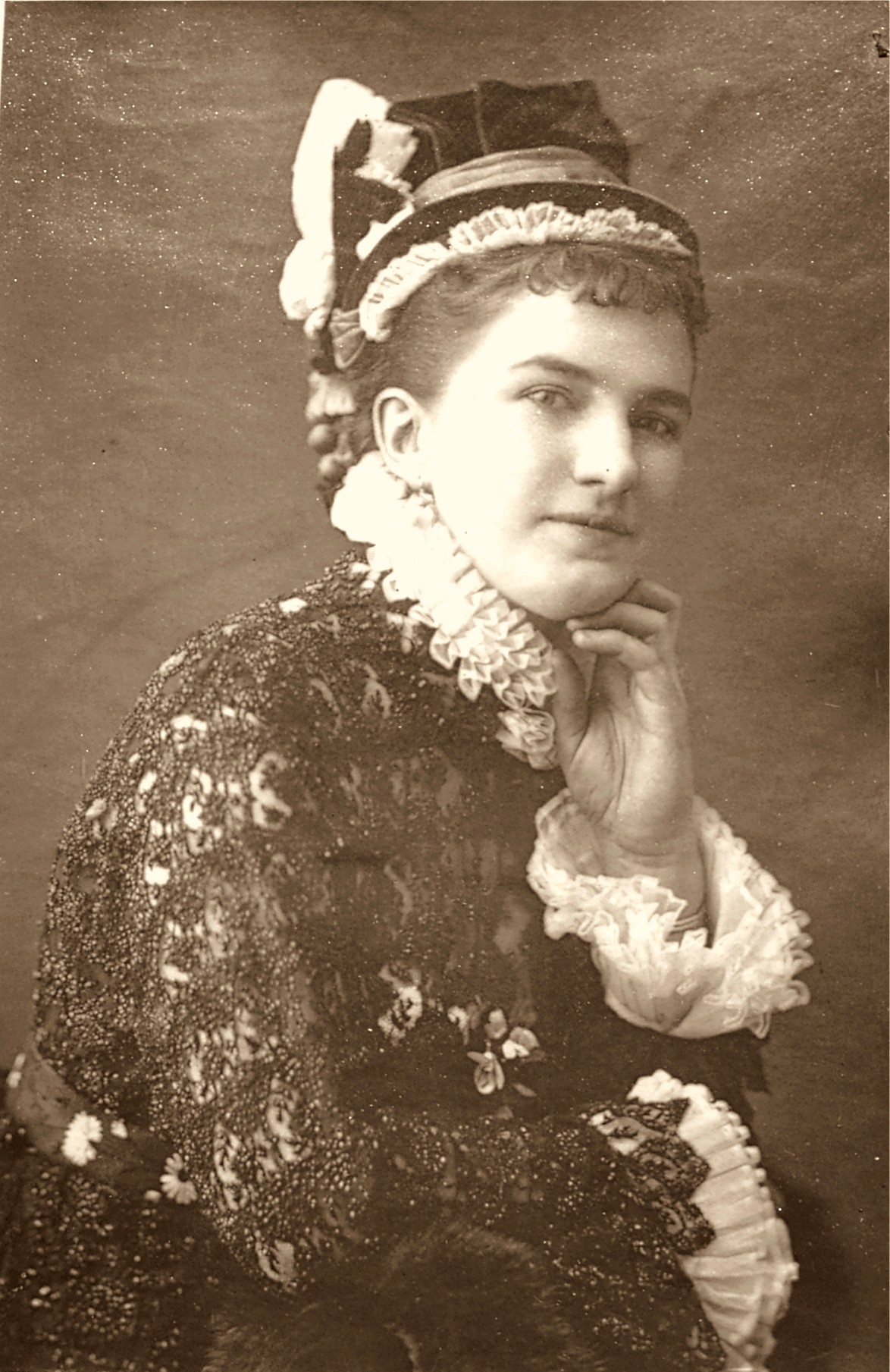

Eleanor Elizabeth Emily (Nelly, sometimes Nellie) Bromley (30 September 1850 – 27 October 1939) was an English actress and singer who performed in operettas, musical burlesques and comic plays. She is best remembered today for having created the role of the Plaintiff in Gilbert & Sullivan's first success, Trial by Jury, although she played in that piece for just over three months out of a successful career spanning nearly two decades.

== Life and early career ==
Bromley was born on 30 September 1850 in London to an actress and singer, also Eleanor Bromley (1826–1860). The identity of her father is unknown. Her mother was born into the large family of her grandparents John Charles Bromley (died 1839) and his wife Hannah née Shailer. Her mother had begun acting while still a teenager, in 1843, appearing at many of the major West End theatres, especially at the Olympic Theatre. She continued to act until she died in childbirth in 1860. In 1857, she had married Charles Henry Cook. After her mother's death, Bromley and her younger sister, Jessy Cook, were raised by their grandmother Hannah.

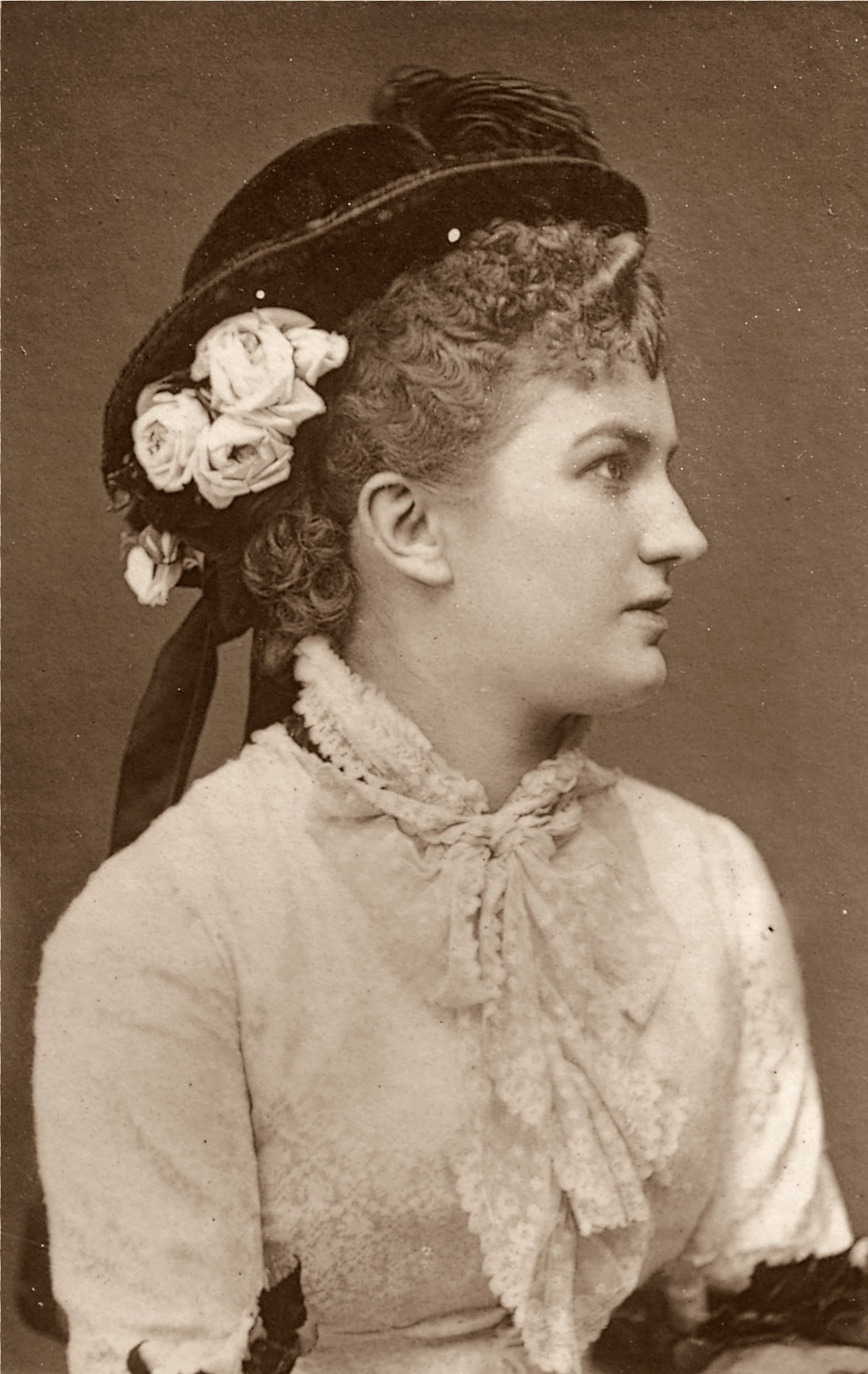
Nelly Bromley

Bromley used her nickname "Nelly" as her stage name and, like her mother, began a stage career in her teens. By December 1866, she was acting at the Royalty Theatre in London, playing Dolly Mayflower in a burlesque by F. C. Burnand of Black-Eyed Susan. She remained in the company at the Royalty, acting in other burlesques, including W. S. Gilbert's Highly Improbable and as Nimble Ned in Burnand's burlesque on Claude Duval. She also played in comedies and toured with Edward Askew Sothern. Like her mother, she soon appeared in many of the West End theatres including the Globe, Olympic, Royal Court, the Gaiety and the Strand. By 1873, she had become popular in H. B. Farnie's musical comedies. In his pasticcio The Black Prince (1874), she and Selina Dolaro played sisters Flossie and Sybil.

== Trial by Jury and later years ==
She then returned to the Royalty (under the management of Richard D'Oyly Carte acting for Selina Dolaro) to create the role of the Plaintiff, on 25 March 1875, in Gilbert and Sullivan's Trial by Jury. Although Bromley was a critical success in the part, she left the production in July 1875. "Trial by Jury Lancers", Charles d'Albert's dance arrangement of numbers from the piece, was dedicated to Bromley.

She next played at the Criterion Theatre as Mrs Graham in The Great Divorce Case, an adaptation of Le Procès Veauradieux. Later in 1875 Bromley played the Princess of Granada in H. S. Leigh's translation of Jacques Offenbach's Les brigands, presented at the Globe Theatre with the title Falsacappa. Bromley acted regularly at the Criterion in a series of long-running English adaptations of French farces: Hot Water, On Bail and, as Rebecca, in the original cast of The Pink Dominos (1877), as well as René in a Farnie and Robert Reece adaptation of Offenbach, La Créole, at the Folly Theatre. In 1879, she created the role of Amy Jones in another hit, Crutch and Toothpick. She returned to the Royalty in 1880, appearing in Venus, an extravaganza by Edward Solomon, Edward Rose and Augustus Harris.

By 1881, Bromley had moved in with artist Archibald Stuart-Wortley. They married in 1884, and he acted as father to her four children: Lillian Bertha (later an actress and singer known as Lilian Eldée, c. 1870–1904), Zoe (born c. 1871), Valentine Robert (1878–1950) and John (born 1881); their fathers are unknown. In 1882, she replaced Lottie Venne in Burnand's farce Betsy at the Criterion. In 1883, she appeared in Freedom at the Theatre Royal, Drury Lane, earning a good review in The Theatre: "Miss Nelly Bromley is pretty and interesting as Constance". She retired from the stage around the same time. In later life, Bromley used her married name, Mrs. Archibald Stuart-Wortley.

Bromley died in Lymington, Hampshire in 1939 at the age of 89.
