= Opera Ball (1956 film) =

- Directed by: Ernst Marischka
- Written by: Viktor Léon (libretto); Heinrich von Waldberg (libretto); Ernst Marischka
- Produced by: Karl Ehrlich
- Starring: Johannes Heesters; Hertha Feiler; Josef Meinrad
- Cinematography: Bruno Mondi
- Edited by: Alfred Srp
- Music by: Richard Heuberger
- Production company: Erma-Film
- Distributed by: Sascha Film (Austria); Herzog Filmverleih (W.Germany)
- Release date: 30 August 1956
- Running time: 95 minutes
- Country: Austria
- Language: German

Opera Ball (German: Opernball) is a 1956 Austrian musical comedy film directed by Ernst Marischka and starring Johannes Heesters, Hertha Feiler and Josef Meinrad. Based on the 1898 operetta Der Opernball, it is part of the operetta film tradition. A previous film version had been made in 1939. The film's sets were designed by the art director Fritz Jüptner-Jonstorff. It was shot using Agfacolor.

== Cast ==
- Johannes Heesters as Georg Dannhauser
- Hertha Feiler as Elisabeth, seine Frau
- Josef Meinrad as Paul Hollinger
- Sonja Ziemann as Helene Hollinger, seine Frau
- Adrian Hoven as Richard Stelzer
- Rudolf Vogel as Eduard von Lamberg
- Fita Benkhoff as Hermine, seine Frau
- Theo Lingen as Philipp, Diener bei Dannhauser
- Dorit Kreysler as Hanni, Dienstmädchen bei Dannhauser
- Frances Martin as Mizzi Schuster
- Hans Moser as Anton Hatschek, Oberkellner

== Bibliography ==
- Waldman, Harry. Nazi Films in America, 1933-1942. McFarland, 2008.
