= The Pink Dominos =

1877 farce by James Albery

Programme for the play during its run, with some cast changes since the first night.

The Pink Dominos is a farce in three acts by James Albery based on the French farce Les Dominos roses by Alfred Hennequin and Alfred Delacour. It concerns a plan by two wives to test their husbands' fidelity at a masked ball and a mischievous maid who causes comic complications by wearing a gown similar to those worn by the wives. The "dominos" of the title are gowns with hoods and masks, worn at masquerades. The piece opened on March 31, 1877 and was exceptionally successful, running for a record-setting 555 performances. Charles Wyndham played one of the husbands and produced the piece at the Criterion Theatre. Augustus Harris played Henry and Fanny Josephs was one of the wives.

== Background and first production ==
Following the success of their 1875 farce Le Procès Veauradieux, Alfred Delacour and Alfred Hennequin, wrote Les Dominos roses for the Théâtre du Vaudeville, Paris, where it premiered in April 1876 and ran for 127 performances. That production had featured the young Gabrielle Réjane at the start of her career.

The actor Charles Wyndham, proprietor of the Criterion Theatre in London, was an adroit farceur, and in the 1870s he presented a series of adaptations of French farces and comedies modified when necessary to meet the sterner moral outlook of London audiences compared with the more relaxed attitude of their French counterparts.

=== Original cast ===
Camille Clermont as Rebecca.

- Charles Greythorne – Charles Wyndham
- Sir Percy Wagstaff – Herbert Standing
- Sophia Greythorne – Mary Eastlake
- Maggie, Lady Wagstaff – Fanny Josephs
- Rebecca – Camille Clermont
- Joskin Tubbs – H. Ashley
- Mrs Joskin Tubbs – Maria Davis
- Henry – Augustus Harris
- Miss Barron – Edith Bruce
- Brisket – J. Clarke

Source: The Era.

Nelly Bromley was originally cast as Rebecca, but was unwell and had to be replaced before the first night. Clermont was succeeded in the role by Camille Dubois (September 1877) and then Rose Saker (October 1877). Six members of the original cast were playing in the piece when the run finished in December 1878: Standing, Ashley and Harris of the men, and Josephs, Davis and Bruce of the women.

== Plot ==
(From a synopsis printed in The Era).

Maggie and Sophia are young married women who regard the male sex from two opposite points of view, the one having little faith in men's regard for the sanctity of the marriage vow, the other regarding mankind in general, and her own husband in particular, as models of marital constancy. Maggie offers to furnish proof that both husbands are partial to an amorous adventure when it comes their way. From this challenge there follow a couple of little scented notes, written by Maggie's maid, Rebecca, and sent to the respective husbands, suggesting a rendezvous that night at a masked ball at the Cremorne pleasure gardens. The husbands at once succumb to this temptation; they are ready with plausible excuses for absenting themselves and presently, when each meets the wife of the other disguised by a "pink domino" the complications begin. They go, in the early hours of the morning, to the same restaurant, where each man has engaged a separate private room, and the imbroglio becomes the more confusing when Rebecca, also wearing a pink domino has, unwilling to lose her share in the night's fun, come to the same establishment escorted by a reasonably virtuous young lawyer, who is the nephew of Maggie's prudish and moralising aunt, Mrs Joskin Tubbs. Cosy little suppers are ordered, champagne flows freely, and, with three young women in pink masks, the respective couples become considerably mixed, and Rebecca has more than her share of the attentions of each of the male revellers.

The gentlemen, proudly conscious of the triumphs they imagine they have secured, depart for their homes, and with the following morning there comes for each of the truant husbands a startling revelation. Charles, the much-trusted spouse of Sophia, learns that Maggie has been at the ball wearing a pink domino; Percy, the untrusted husband of Maggie, is made aware of a similar fact with regard to Sophia; each man thinks he has terribly injured his friend, and each for a time is prone to painful remorse. Their remorse gives way to astonishment when there is brought in a bracelet found in the restaurant, and known to have been worn by the mysterious "pink domino" lady. Their astonishment arises from the fact that this bracelet is known to belong to that model of all that is virtuous and proper, Mrs Joskin Tubbs. This mystery, with others of the evening, is cleared up when it is made known that the young lawyer has borrowed some of his aunt's jewellery for the better adornment of Rebecca. Rebecca, to spare her mistress pain, and ashamed to return, sends to the house the domino she had worn at the ball. In this the one husband spies the hole he has burned with his cigar; the other notes the corner he remembers to have torn. In these they find proof positive, as they think, of the identity of the damsel with whom they have achieved a conquest, and, as neither is proud of the adventure, they keep quiet, and are ready to promise fidelity to their accusing wives, who are willing to pardon their faithlessness. Maggie is satisfied with the success of her scheme, and Sophia acknowledges that her faith in man's fidelity was based on a very shaky foundation.

== See also ==
- Der Opernball (1898 operetta)
- To-Night's the Night (1914 musical)

== Sources ==
- Noël, Edouard; Edmond Stoullig (1877). Les Annales du théâtre et de la musique, 1876. Paris: Charpentier. OCLC 172996346.
