= Opera Ball (1939 film) =

1939 film directed by Géza von Bolváry

- Directed by: Géza von Bolváry
- Written by: Viktor Léon (libretto); Heinrich von Waldberg (libretto); Ernst Marischka
- Produced by: Viktor von Struwe
- Starring: Heli Finkenzeller; Fita Benkhoff; Marte Harell
- Cinematography: Willy Winterstein
- Edited by: Alice Ludwig
- Music by: Richard Heuberger (operetta); Peter Kreuder
- Production company: Terra Film
- Distributed by: Terra Film
- Release date: 22 December 1939
- Running time: 107 minutes
- Country: Germany
- Language: German

Opera Ball (German: Opernball) is a 1939 German musical comedy film directed by Géza von Bolváry and starring Heli Finkenzeller, Fita Benkhoff, and Marte Harell. An operetta film, it is based on the 1898 work of the same name composed by Richard Heuberger. In 1956 it was remade as Opera Ball in Austria with some of the same cast. It was shot at the Babelsberg Studios in Berlin. The film's sets were designed by the art director Robert Herlth. Erna Berger provided a singing voice.

== Main cast ==
- Heli Finkenzeller as Helene Hollinger
- Fita Benkhoff as Stubenmädchen Hanni
- Marte Harell as Elisabeth Dannhauser
- Hans Moser as Hatschek
- Paul Hörbiger as Georg Dannhauser
- Will Dohm as Paul Hollinger
- Theo Lingen as Diener Philipp
- Erika von Thellmann as Baronin Hermine von Lamberg

== Bibliography ==
- Waldman, Harry (2008). Nazi Films in America, 1933–1942. Jefferson, NC: McFarland. ISBN 978-0-7864-3861-7.
