= Leap Year (1932 film) =

1932 film

- Directed by: Tom Walls
- Written by: A. R. Rawlinson
- Produced by: Herbert Wilcox
- Starring: Tom Walls; Anne Grey; Edmund Breon
- Cinematography: Freddie Young
- Music by: Lew Stone
- Production company: British and Dominions
- Distributed by: Woolf and Freedman
- Release date: 11 October 1932
- Running time: 91 minutes
- Country: United Kingdom
- Language: English

Leap Year is a 1932 British comedy film directed by Tom Walls, who co-stars with Anne Grey, Edmund Breon and Ellis Jeffreys. Made at British and Dominion's Elstree Studios, it was written by A. R. Rawlinson, and produced by Herbert Wilcox. The film was re-released in 1937.

== Cast ==
- Tom Walls as Sir Peter Traillon
- Anne Grey as Paula Zahren
- Edmund Breon as Jack Debrant
- Ellis Jeffreys as Mrs Debrant
- Jeanne Stuart as Angela Mallard
- Charles Carson as Sir Archibald Mallard
- Laurence Hanray as Hope
- Franklyn Bellamy as Silas
- Joan Brierley as Girl

== Bibliography ==
- Low, Rachael. Filmmaking in 1930s Britain. George Allen & Unwin, 1985.
- Wood, Linda. British Films, 1927-1939. British Film Institute, 1986.
