= Saint-Germain (actor) =

French actor

Saint-Germain in mid-career

François Victor Arthur Gilles de Saint-Germain (12 January 1832 – 16 July 1899), professionally known simply as Saint-Germain, was a French actor, known for his playing of comic parts. In a career lasting from 1852 to 1896 he created leading roles in comedies by writers including Eugène Labiche, Henri Meilhac, Alfred Hennequin and Georges Feydeau.

== Life and career ==
He was born in Paris in January 1832 as François Victor Arthur Gilles, the son of Louis Antoine Fortuné Gilles, an architect, and Marie Hélène née Cudel. He later adopted the stage name Saint-Germain. Of a bourgeois family, he had a conventional education before enrolling at the Paris Conservatoire at the age of 17. He entered the class of Jean-Baptiste Provost, a noted Sociétaire of the Comédie-Française. Provost later said that his only good students were François Got, Louis-Arsène Delaunay and Saint-Germain.

After leaving the Conservatoire, Saint-Germain joined the company of the Odéon-Théâtre in 1852. The Odéon was state-owned and ranked second only to the Comédie-Française. Saint-Germain came to public notice there the following year in the roles of Pasquin (Harlequin) in Marivaux's comedy Le Jeu de l'amour et du hasard (The Game of Love and Chance) and the mischievous peasant Tourny in George Sand's Mauprat. In July 1854 he left the Odéon for the Comédie-Française, where he remained for five years. When he left there, he was succeeded in the main comic roles by Benoît-Constant Coquelin. Comparing their styles, Saint-Germain said that he himself played a small flute, whereas Coquelin played the trombone.

As Pétillon (centre) in Bébé (1877)

After leaving the Comédie-Française, Saint-Germain became the leading comic actor at the Théâtre du Vaudeville, where he remained for 16 years, creating hundreds of roles by authors including Eugène Labiche, Henri Rivière, Alfred Delacour, Alfred Hennequin and Clairville. From 1876 to 1882 he was at the Théâtre du Gymnase, where Henri Meilhac, Jules Claretie and Albert Wolff were among the dramatists who wrote roles for him. Looking back at his career in 1899, Le Figaro counted Pétillon, the eccentric tutor, in Hennequin and Émile de Najac's Bébé (1877) as the best of all his roles. In 1887 he married Caroline Riel (1847-1921), who acted on the Paris stage as Julie Riel. In 1872 while appearing on the stage in London she had been involved in an infamous case when her mother, Marie Caroline Riel, was murdered in their temporary home in London by her cook, Marguerite Dixblanc.

Finally, when some thought his career was drawing towards its end, Saint-Germain moved to the Théâtre du Palais-Royal, where he had a new lease of life, attracting excellent notices for his performances in two of Georges Feydeau's early farces, Monsieur chasse! (1892) and Un fil à la patte (1894). The last of Saint-Germain's roles recorded by Les Archives du spectacle was Ravinel in Léon Épinette and Pierre Soulaine's comedie Le Tandem in May 1896, in which Les Annales du théâtre et de la musique praised him as "a true actor".

Saint-German died in the Paris suburb Courbevoie on 16 July 1899 at the age of 67.

== References and sources ==
=== Sources ===
- Noël, Edouard; Edmond Stoullig (1893). Les Annales du théâtre et de la musique, 1892. Paris: Charpentier. OCLC 172996346.
- Noël, Edouard; Edmond Stoullig (1895). Les Annales du théâtre et de la musique, 1894. Paris: Charpentier. OCLC 172996346.
- Stoullig, Edmond (1897). Les Annales du théâtre et de la musique, 1896. Paris: Ollendorff. OCLC 172996346.
