= Alfred Dieudonné =

19th-century French actor

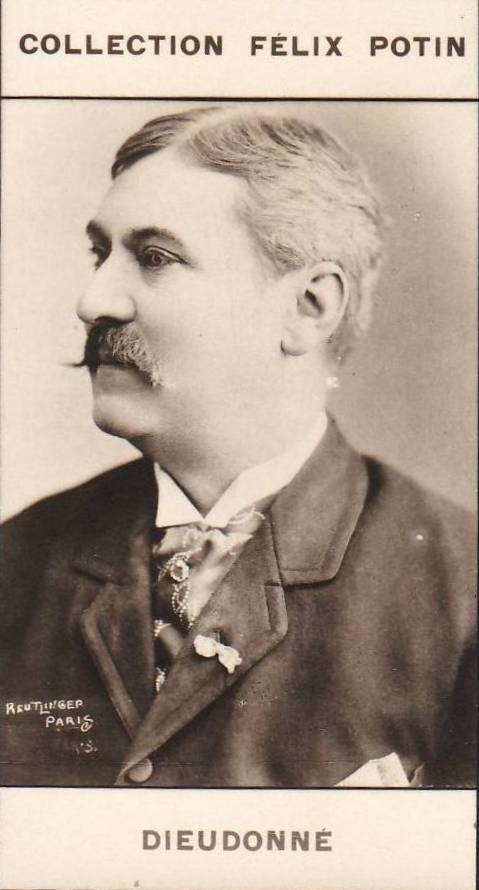
Alfred Dieudonné

Alphonse Emile Alfred Dieudonné, called simply Dieudonné, (12 January 1834 in the 1st arrondissement of Paris - 1922 in Paris) was a French actor who had one of the longest careers in the French theatre.

== Life ==
He travelled extensively throughout his life, both in Parisian theatres and in the provinces and even abroad.

He made his debut in Lisbon in 1856, then followed Rachel on one of her tours in the United States. On his return to France, he played for a while at the Théâtre de l'Ambigu, then moved on to the Théâtre du Gymnase until 1864. During this period, he appeared in two plays by Labiche, alongside Jean-Marie Geoffroy : * Le Voyage de monsieur Perrichon, comedy in four acts by Labiche, created on 10 September 1860 (part of Armand); and La Poudre aux yeux, comedy in 2 acts by Labiche, created on 19 October 1861 (part of Frédéric). He then spent ten years in St. Petersburg (1864-1874; in the French Imperial Theater Direction Company (ru: Французская труппа при императорских театрах) and was a success; among his roles in St. Petersburg : Pâris - La Belle Hélène by Jacques Offenbach in 1866, for the first time in Russia), returned to France in 1874, where he was hired for a year at the Théâtre du Palais-Royal, and where he played in Les Samedis de Madame, a comedy in 3 acts by Labiche, created on 15 September 1874. (part of Léon, also alongside of Jean-Marie Geoffroy). He then played for twenty years at the Théâtre du Vaudeville, and ended his career flitting between multiple Parisian theatres.

In 1860, he married Victoire Eugénie Blancan born in the 5th arrondissement of Paris on 14 December 1831, an actress herself and also the daughter of actors, who made her entire career by following her husband in the same places (Paris, St. Petersburg, etc.) and in the same theatres. She probably died around 1896.

They had two daughters including Alphonsine Eugénie (born 15 January 1860) in Paris who also became an actress under the name of Miss Déa Dieudonné. Her very short career was abruptly interrupted at Cannes on 24 February 1896. In that year, father and daughter had obtained an engagement at the city casino, where they had brilliant success. One evening, she came home happy after the performance, went to bed and fell asleep. The next day, she was discovered dead in her bed. Her funeral was held at the Russian Church in Paris.

The actress Hélène Dieudonné (1887-1980) was his natural daughter. He did not recognize her until 1916.

Dieudonné died in Paris at the age of 88.

== Repertoire ==
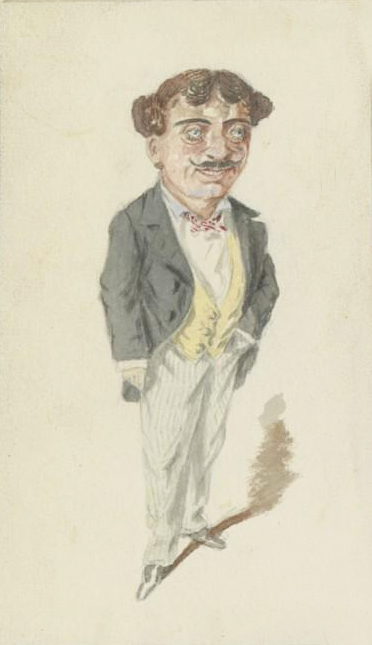
Dieudonné in Les Samedis de Madame by Eugène Labiche, portrait by Lhéritier (1874)

- 1875 : Madame Lili by Marc Monnier, Théâtre du Vaudeville
- 1885: Clara Soleil by Edmond Gondinet and Pierre Sivrac, Théâtre du Vaudeville
- 1887: Monsieur de Morat by Edmond-Joseph-Louis Tarbé des Sablons: Liliane by Félicien Champsaur and Léopold Lacour, Théâtre du Vaudeville
- 1905: Bertrade by Jules Lemaître, Théâtre de la Renaissance
- 1906: Les Passagères by Alfred Capus, Théâtre de la Renaissance
- 1908 : La Femme nue by Henry Bataille, Théâtre de la Renaissance
- 1908: L'Émigré by Paul Bourget, Théâtre de la Renaissance
- 1909: Un ange by Alfred Capus, Théâtre des Variétés
- 1912: La Prise de Berg-Op-Zoom by Sacha Guitry, Théâtre du Vaudeville
