= Ada Dyas =

Irish actress

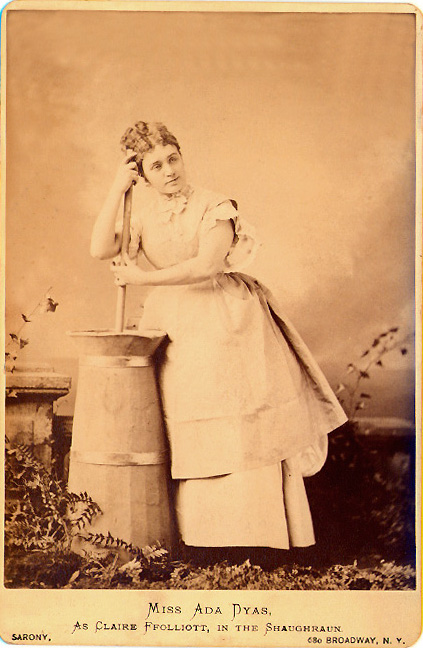
The Irish actress, Ada Dyas, as character Claire Folliott in the Broadway show, The Shaughraun. Circa 1874.

Ada Dyas (July 28, 1843 - March 12, 1908) was an Irish actress. She made her London debut in 1861 in Henry IV, and became famous in the 1871 play based on Wilkie Collins's novel The Woman in White.

== Career ==
Ada Dyas was the daughter of Mrs. Edward Dyas, "an actress of some ability attached to the London theatres". Ada Dyas made her London debut in 1861 in Henry IV, playing "Prince John of Lancaster".

Dyas gained a degree of popularity while touring with "Miss Marie Wilton's London Comedy Company", where she played as "Esther Eccles" in Thomas William Robertson's Caste. In 1871 she was in the original cast of Wilkie Collins's The Woman in White which opened at the Olympic Theatre on October 9, playing both "Laura Fairlie" and "Anne Caherick". In 1873 she was at the Vaudeville Theater.

Dyas's first American appearance was under the management of Augustin Daly in 1872 at the Fifth Avenue Theatre, in New York, in Man and Wife, based on the Wilkie Collins's novel. Daly was a disciplinarian who set firm rules forbidding members of the company to leave the city without permission, even if they were not on the evening's bill, nor were they free to speak to visitors in the Greenroom. Dyas was one of those who took exception to the regulations and left to join Wallack's.

Later, at Wallack's, her most successful roles were those of Kate Hardcastle, Lady Teazle in The School for Scandal, Lady Gay Spanker, Lydia Languish, and especially that of Claire Ffolliott in Boucicault's The Shaughraun. After Wallack's she became a member of the Madison Square Company.

Albert Ellery Berg said of Dyas, she "...has a crisp, bright style which she uses with fine intelligence".

She toured as Mrs. Ralston in Jim the Penman and as Mrs. Seabrooke in Captain Swift. In 1892 she played Goneril in Sir Henry Irving's revival of King Lear at the London Lyceum.

Her performance in The Shaughraun is mentioned in Edith Wharton's 1920 novel The Age of Innocence.

Ada Dyas died in Seaton, England in 1908.
