= Auguste Vitu =

French journalist and writer

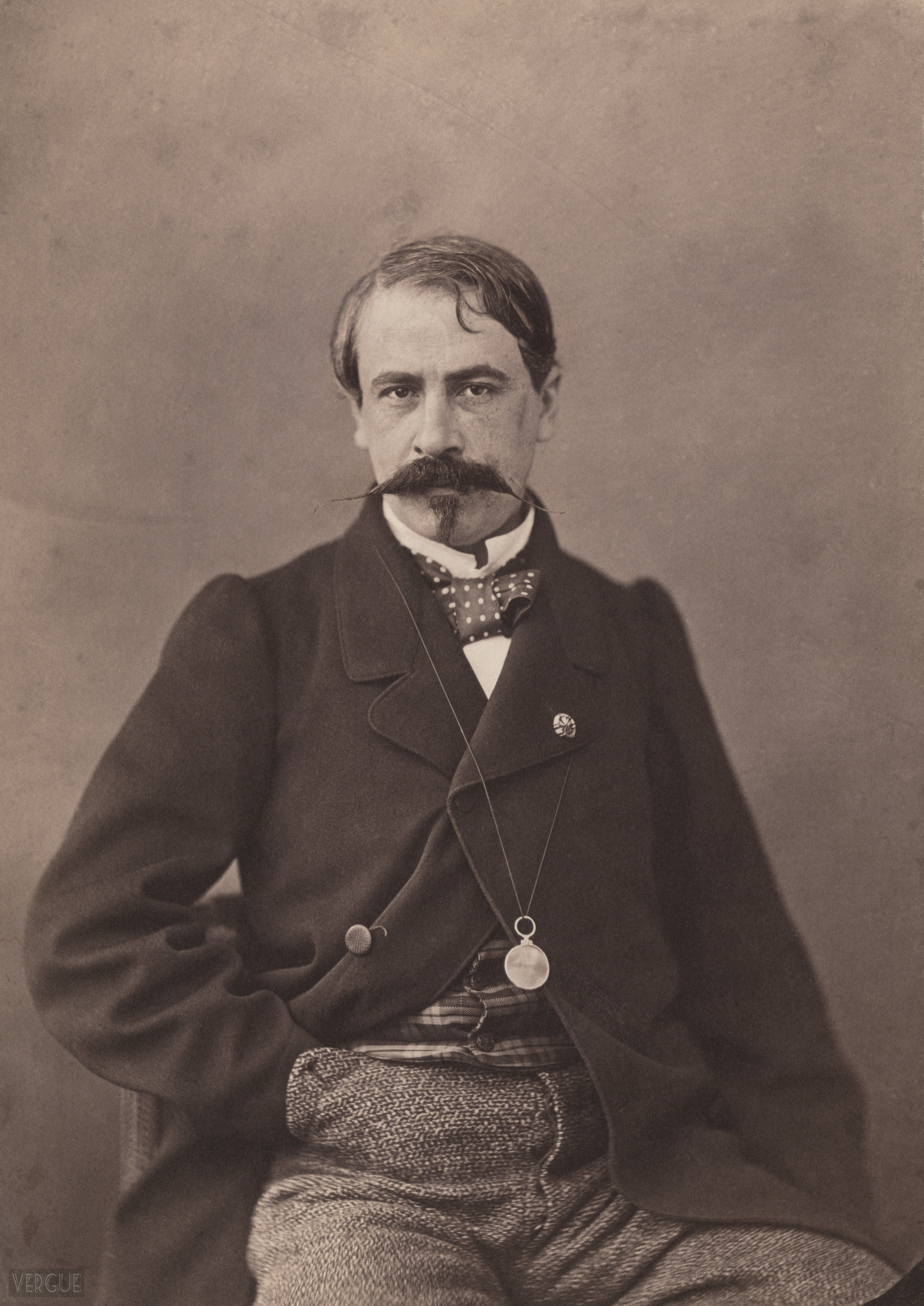
- Portrait by Nadar
- Born: Auguste-Charles-Joseph Vitu; 7 October 1823; Médon
- Died: 5 August 1891 (aged 67); 8th arrondissement of Paris
- Occupations: Writer, journalist

Auguste-Charles-Joseph Vitu (7 October 1823 – 5 August 1891) was a 19th-century French journalist and writer.

== Biography ==
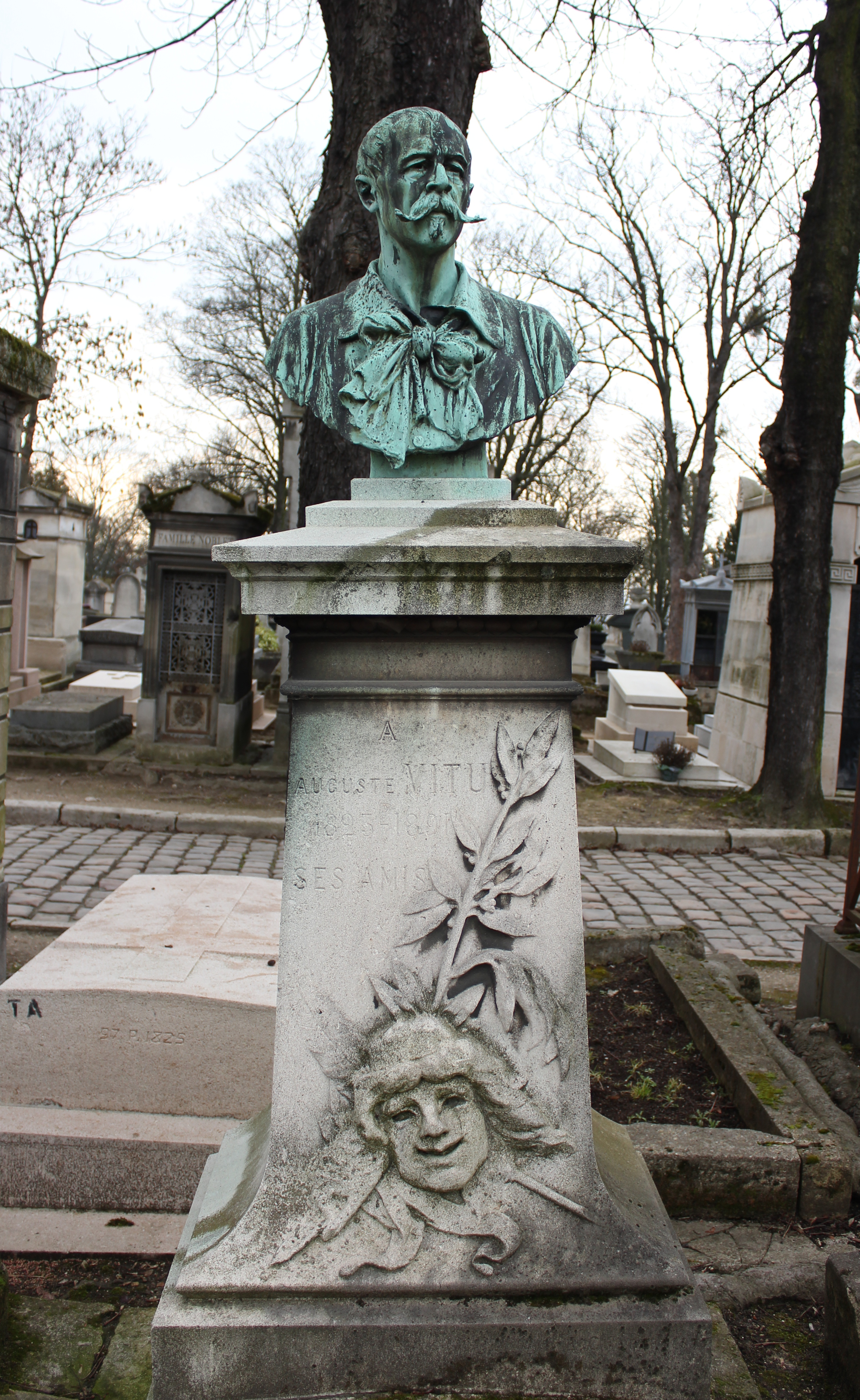
Vitu's grave at Père Lachaise Cemetery.

The natural son of a Parisian rentier, Vitu began his career as a typographer-worker before becoming a journalist. In 1867 he founded Le Journal des Finances (which he directed until his death in 1891) and later created the newspaper L’Étendard from which he was lucky to be deposed in August 1868, before the sensational trial filed against the manager Jules Pic. He was chief editor of the Peuple Français at the request of Napoleon III from 1869.

Vitu is mostly known for his book Paris, images et traditions, reprinted several times. He also published a book on the popular jargon of the 15th century and another on Napoleon III whose style of moustache and goatee he adopted.

Auguste Vitu was in turn publisher, political and military historian, literary and theatre critic, novelist, author of finance textbooks. He collaborated with numerous Parisian newspapers and founded Le Bons sens d'Auvergne in Clermont-Ferrand and L'Ami de l'ordre in Grenoble to local policy purposes.

He is buried at Père Lachaise Cemetery (46th division) in Paris. The rue Auguste-Vitu in the 15th arrondissement of Paris was named after him in 1912.

== Main publications ==
- date unknown: Histoire de la Typographie, librairie Ch. Delagrave, Paris
- 1845–1846: Les Chauffeurs du Nord, novel published under the name Vidocq
- 1851: Révision ou révolution
- 1852: L’Empereur à Grenoble
- 1854: L’Histoire de Napoléon III et du rétablissement de l’Empire
- 1854: Études littéraires sur la Révolution française
- 1860: La Résurrection de Lazare, with Henri Murger
- 1860: Ombres et vieux murs
- 1860: Contes à dormir debout
- 1861: Le Budget de 1862
- 1864: Le Guide financier
- after 1867: Paris : 450 dessins inédits
- 1868: L’Histoire civile de l’armée
- 1868: Le Bilan de l’Empire
- 1869: Qui mange le budget ?
- 1869: Les Réunions publiques à Paris et Les Réunions électorales à Paris, brochure où l’auteur n’a pour documents que des rapports de police qui dénaturent complètement presque partout la pensée des orateurs
- 1873: Notice sur François Villon
- 1874: Le Lendemain de l’Empire
- 1883: La maison de Molière, winner of the prix Montyon in literature awarded by the Académie française.

== Honours ==
- Chevalier of the Légion d'honneur (15 March 1862 decree)
- Officier of the Légion d'honneur (30 June 1867 decree)
