= Le Procès Veauradieux =

Scene from the London version of the play

Le Procès Veauradieux (The Veauradieux Trial) is an 1875 farce written by Alfred Hennequin and Alfred Delacour. It was one of the major successes of Hennequin's career.

== Background and first production ==
Alfred Hennequin had a success with his farce Les trois chapeaux, produced at the Théâtre du Vaudeville, Paris in 1871, but as Le Figaro later commented, "in Paris, the difficulty is not writing amusing plays – it is getting them played". Hennequin's next success was not until June 1875. He collaborated with Alfred Delacour on a three-act farce, Le Procès Veauradieux (The Veauradieux Trial). The Vaudeville was officially closed for the customary summer break, and Paris was in the middle of a heatwave, but the members of the theatre's company decided to stage the play regardless of their management. It opened on 19 June 1875 and ran for 175 performances, at a time when a run of more than 100 performances was regarded as a success in Parisian theatres.

=== Original cast ===
- Gastinel – Auguste Parade
- Fauvinard – Saint-Germain
- Tardivant – Alfred Dieudonné
- De Bagnolle – Édouard Georges
- Mme Laiguisier – Mme Alexis
- Césarine – Léontine Massin
- Mme de Bagnolle – Mlle Germinie
- Angèle – Mlle Delta
- Isidore-Fanchette – Mlle Lamare
- Thérèse – Mlle Marcelle
- Sophie – Mlle Andréa

Source: Les Annales du théâtre et de la musique and Les Archives du spectacle.

== Synopsis ==
Fauvinard is a Parisian lawyer, with a bullying mother-in-law. He and his colleague Tardivaut fabricate a case – the Veauradieux trial – to create an alibi for their extramarital affairs. It chances that both their mistresses live in the same apartment block, and that, unknown to them, Tardivaut's mistress, Zizi, has another admirer: Fauvinard's lecherous but narcoleptic uncle. Fauvinard's mistress, Césarine, also has another admirer, whose wife is Fauvinard's client in her divorce suit. Circumstances bring all the main characters together in Césarine's flat, where the urgent necessity to avoid being found there causes frenetic exits and entrances, offstage savagings by Césarine's man-hating pet dog, and adoption of fictitious identities. Eventually all is safely resolved, and the men are back under the supervision of their wives (and mothers-in-law) convinced that dissipation does not suit them.

== Reception ==
The authors of Les Annales du théâtre et de la musique wrote:

It is a long time since we laughed so much and so heartily at the Vaudeville. Everyone looked at each other astonished. You couldn't believe your ears. Everyone had arrived at the theatre without enthusiasm and resigned to spending a boring evening. Not at all: this play … begins with a huge burst of laughter, and as the scenes follow one another and the evening progresses, the laughter crescendos to become almost universal … a great, complete success … We laughed during the show. We were laughing when we came out. And we will laugh at it for a long time.

In Le Figaro Auguste Vitu wrote, "M. Delacour and M. Hennequin won the Veauradieux Trial, with interest, damages and costs; we laughed for two hours, laughed as in the good old days of the Vaudeville, as at the best evenings of the Palais-Royal, (Note: The Théâtre du Palais-Royal had a long tradition of comedy in general and farce in particular.) we laughed like a herd of madmen".

== Revivals and adaptations ==
Dion Boucicault adapted the play as Forbidden Fruit, premiered on Broadway in 1876, That version was given in the West End in 1880, but the first version of Le Procès Veauradieux seen in London was The Great Divorce Case by "John Doe and Richard Roe" (later revealed to be Clement Scott and Arthur Mattison), successfully produced by Charles Wyndham at the Criterion Theatre, London, in April 1876. That version, which was suitably toned down to satisfy the Lord Chamberlain (the official censor) and the Victorian public, was translated back into French so that a French troupe, led by Didier and Schey, could perform the more respectable version during their 1876 season in London: the Lord Chamberlain declined to license Delacour and Hennequin's original. Wyndham presented The Great Divorce Case on Broadway in 1883.

Le Procès Veauradieux was revived in London in 2010 at the Orange Tree Theatre under the title Once Bitten.

== Notes, references and sources ==
=== Sources ===
- Davis, Jessica Milner (1978). Farce. London. ISBN 978-0-416-81580-1.
- Huberman, Jeffrey (1986). Late Victorian Farce. Ann Arbor: UMI Research Press. ISBN 978-0-8357-1774-8.
- Noël, Edouard; Edmond Stoullig (1876). Les Annales du théâtre et de la musique, 1875. Paris: Charpentier. OCLC 172996346.
- Noël, Edouard; Edmond Stoullig (1877). Les Annales du théâtre et de la musique, 1876. Paris: Charpentier. OCLC 172996346.
