= Richard Heuberger =

Austrian composer

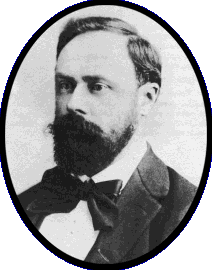
Richard Heuberger

Richard Franz Joseph Heuberger (18 June 1850 in Graz, Austria – 28 October 1914 in Vienna, Austria) was an Austrian composer of operas and operettas, a music critic, and teacher.

Heuberger was born in Graz, the son of a bandage manufacturer. He initially studied engineering, but gave it up in 1876, and turned to music. He studied at the Graz Conservatory (where he studied with Robert Fuchs), and later transferred to Vienna, where he eventually became the chorus master of the Wiener Akademischer Gesangverein, conductor of the Wiener Singakademie, director of the Wiener Männergesang-Verein (Vienna Men's Choral Association), and a teacher at the Konservatorium der Stadt Wien.

As a music critic he wrote for the Neues Wiener Tagblatt in 1881, the Allgemeine Zeitung in Munich in 1889, and (succeeding Hanslick) for the Neue Freie Presse from 1896 until 1901. He also edited the Musikbuch aus Österreich (1904–6).

Although Heuberger wrote many operas, ballets, choral works, and songs, he is best known today for his operetta Der Opernball, composed in 1898. He taught at the Vienna Conservatory from 1902. Among his pupils was Clemens Krauss.

== Selected works ==
Operettas

- Der Opernball (1898)
- Ihre Excellenz (1899), revised as Eine entzückende Frau
- Der Sechsuhrzug (1900)
- Das Baby (1902)
- Der Fürst von Düsterstein (1909)
- Don Quixote (1910)

Operas

- Abenteuer einer Neujahrsnacht (1886)
- Manuel Venegas (1889), revised as Mirjam, oder Das Maifest (1894)
- Barfüssele (1905)

Ballets

- Die Lautenschlägerin (1896)
- Struwwelpeter (1897)
