= Alfred Delacour =

French playwright and librettist

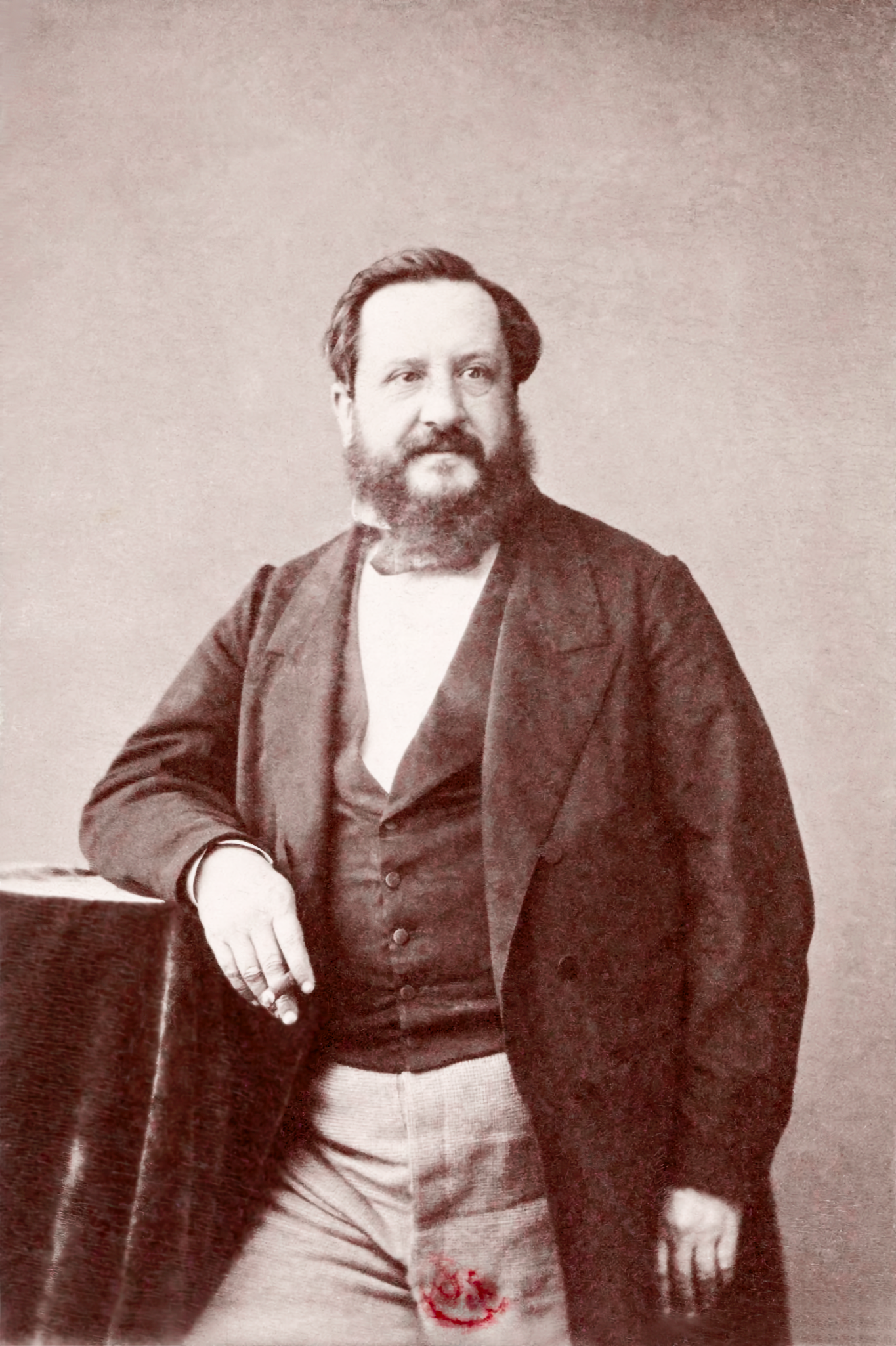
- Born: Pierre-Alfred Lartigue; 3 September 1817; Bordeaux
- Died: 31 March 1883 (aged 65); 9th arrondissement of Paris
- Occupations: Playwright and librettist.

Alfred Delacour or Alfred-Charlemagne Delacour, real name Pierre-Alfred Lartigue, (3 September 1817 – 31 March 1883) was a 19th-century French playwright and librettist.

== Biography ==
In addition to his occupation as a physician, which he practised from 1841, Delacour turned progressively to the theatre. He collaborated with Eugène Labiche and Clairville for several vaudevilles

== Titles and decorations ==
- Knight of the Legion of honour (7 August 1867 decree) His entry on the Base Léonore wrongly calls him Alfred-Charlemagne which was his pen name.

== Plays ==
Le Courrier de Lyon (1850) was one of Delacour's noted plays. It was written together with Eugène Moreau and Paul Siraudin. The play was based on the story of Joseph Lesurques, an innocent man who was executed after he was mistaken for the leader of a gang who brutally murdered a courier. Aside from his collaborations with Labiche and Clairville, Delacour also worked with Lambert Thiboust on Le diable (1880), a French drama. Some of the playwright's vaudeville plays inspired Clement Scott and Arthur Matthison's Great Divorce Case (1876) and James Albery's The Pink Dominos (1877).

- 1847: L'Hospitalité d'une grisette by Mathieu Barthélemy Thouin and Delacour
- 1849: E. H. by Eugène Moreau, Paul Siraudin and Delacour
- 1850: Le Courrier de Lyon by Eugène Moreau, Paul Siraudin and Delacour, Théâtre de la Gaîté
- 1851: La fille qui trompe son mari by Eugène Moreau and Delacour
- 1852: Paris qui dort by Lambert-Thiboust and Delacour, Théâtre des Variétés
- 1855: Un bal d'auvergnats by Paul Siraudin, Delacour and Lambert-Thiboust, Théâtre du Palais-Royal
- 1856: La Queue de la poële by Paul Siraudin and Delacour, Théâtre du Palais-Royal
- 1858: Deux merles blancs by Eugène Labiche and Delacour, Théâtre des Variétés
- 1859: Un mari à la porte by Delacour and Léon Morand, opérette in one act with music by Offenbach; Bouffes-Parisiens, Salle Lacaze
- 1861: Les Voisins de Molinchart by Marc-Michel and Delacour
- 1862: Les Petits Oiseaux by Eugène Labiche and Delacour, Théâtre du Vaudeville
- 1864: La Cagnotte by Eugène Labiche and Delacour, Théâtre du Palais-Royal
- 1864: Le Point de mire by Eugène Labiche and Delacour, Théâtre de la Cour
- 1864: Les Femmes sérieuses by Paul Siraudin, Alfred and Ernest Blum, Théâtre du Palais-Royal
- 1865: L'Homme qui manque le coche by Eugène Labiche and Delacour, Théâtre des Variétés
- 1865: Le Voyage en Chine by Eugène Labiche and Delacour, Opéra-Comique
- 1875: Le Procès Veauradieux by Alfred Hennequin and Delacour.
- 1876: Le roi dort by Eugène Labiche and Delacour, Théâtre des Variétés
- 1876: Les Dominos roses by Alfred Hennequin and Delacour, Théâtre du Vaudeville

== Adaptations for television ==
- 1964: Célimare le bien-aimé, by Delacour and Eugène Labiche (1863), television film by René Lucot
- 2009: La Cagnotte, by Delacour and Eugène Labiche (1864), television film by Philippe Monnier.

== Bibliography ==
- Hippolyte Minier, Le théâtre à Bordeaux, étude historique suivi de la nomenclature des auteurs dramatiques bordelais et de leurs ouvrages, établie en collaboration avec Jules Delpit, Bordeaux, 1883, (p. 53)
