= The Era (newspaper) =

British newspaper

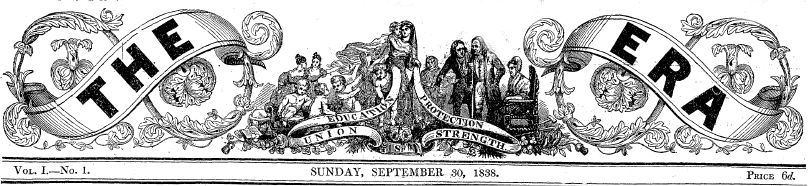
Banner of the first issue, 1838

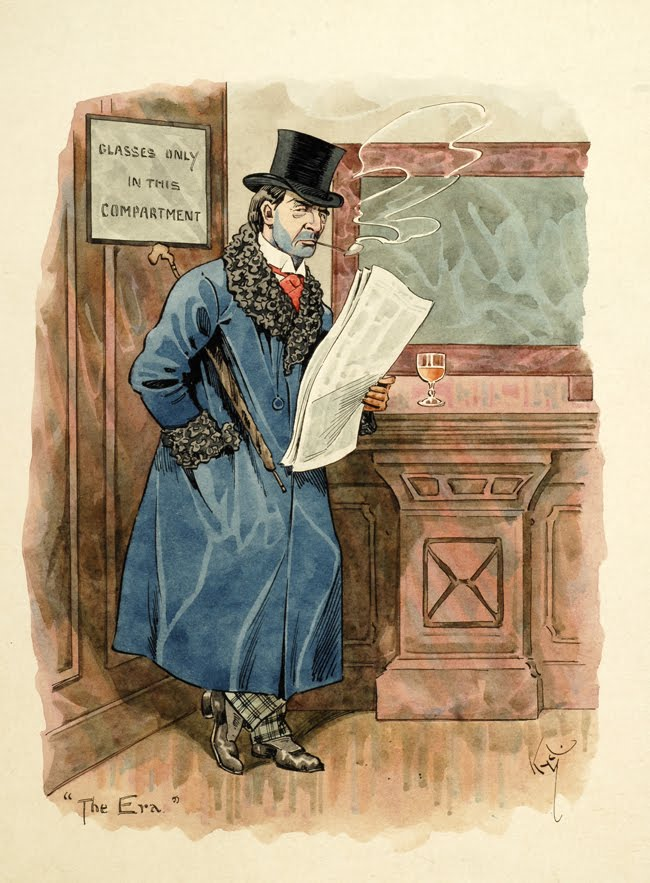
A Reader of The Era by Joseph Clayton Clark, c. 1900

The Era was a British weekly paper, published from 1838 to 1939. Originally a general newspaper, it became noted for its sports coverage, and later for its theatrical content.

== History ==
The Era was established in 1838 by a body of shareholders consisting of licensed victuallers and other people connected with their trade. The journal was intended to be a weekly organ of the public-house interest, just as the Morning Advertiser was then its daily organ. In the first two or three years of its existence, its political stance was broadly Liberal. Its first editor, Leitch Ritchie, proved too liberal for his board of directors, and in addition to editorial clashes, the paper was a commercial failure. Ritchie was succeeded by Frederick Ledger, who became sole proprietor as well as editor. He edited the paper for more than thirty years, gradually changing its politics from Liberalism to moderate Conservatism. Politics, however, ceased to be a major concern of The Era. Its great features after it came into the hands of Ledger were sport, freemasonry and the theatre. A contemporary observer remarked, "To the latter subject it has always devoted a very large part of its space. In relation indeed to the amount and accuracy of its theatrical intelligence, it far surpasses every other weekly journal."

In an 1856 advertisement, The Era claimed to be the "largest Newspaper in the World, containing Sixty-four Columns of closely-printed matter in small type. It is the only Weekly Newspaper combining all the advantages of a first-rate Sporting Journal, with those of a Family Newspaper. Literature and the Metropolitan and Provincial Drama has more space allotted to them in the Era than in any other Journal. The Operatic and Musical Intelligence, Home and Continental, is always most copious and interesting." The Era became regarded as "Invaluable for reviews, news, and general theatrical information and gossip. Also of value are the assorted advertisements by and for actors and companies"

The theatrical historian W. J. MacQueen-Pope described The Era as "The Actor's Bible", with the theatrical coverage gradually assuming prominence over all else:

By degrees and largely because of increasing advertisements, The Era began to take more and more interest in theatrical affairs and gave weekly reports of theatrical happenings in London and the great provincial cities.... [A]s Music Hall grew so the space devoted to it grew; The Era became the great theatrical journal and every member of the profession, stage or hall, just had to buy it although the price was steep, it remained at 6d. for many years. However, to be seen walking along the street with The Era under the arm, its title displayed for the passer-by to read, proved to all that the person carrying it was a "Pro".

The Era was the longest running theatrical trade paper and continued to publish until the beginning of World War II, although its popularity and importance had long since declined.
