= Misbehaviour (film) =

2020 British film by Philippa Lowthorpe

- Theatrical release poster
- Directed by: Philippa Lowthorpe
- Screenplay by: Gaby Chiappe; Rebecca Frayn
- Story by: Rebecca Frayn
- Produced by: Suzanne Mackie; Sarah-Jane Wheale
- Starring: Keira Knightley; Gugu Mbatha-Raw; Jessie Buckley; Keeley Hawes; Phyllis Logan; Lesley Manville; Rhys Ifans; Greg Kinnear
- Cinematography: Zac Nicholson
- Edited by: Úna Ní Dhonghaíle
- Music by: Dickon Hinchliffe
- Production companies: Pathé; BBC Films; British Film Institute; Ingenious Media; Left Bank Pictures
- Distributed by: 20th Century Fox (through Buena Vista International)
- Release date: 13 March 2020
- Running time: 106 minutes
- Country: United Kingdom
- Language: English
- Box office: $2 million

Misbehaviour is a 2020 British comedy-drama film directed by Philippa Lowthorpe, from a screenplay by Gaby Chiappe and Rebecca Frayn, from a story by Frayn. The film stars Keira Knightley, Gugu Mbatha-Raw, Jessie Buckley, Keeley Hawes, Phyllis Logan, Lesley Manville, Rhys Ifans and Greg Kinnear.

Misbehaviour was released in the United Kingdom on 13 March 2020 by Pathé's distribution partner 20th Century Fox via Buena Vista International. It is the final film from Pathé UK to be released under the 20th Century Fox name.

== Plot ==
Sally Alexander successfully applies to study history at University College London. At a conference on women's rights she meets Jo Robinson, a feminist activist. After helping Jo evade arrest for defacing a sexist billboard advertisement, Jo introduces Sally to her women's group where she is invited to collaborate on the group's messaging and media as part of a planned protest at the 1970 Miss World competition, which is due to take place in London. American comedian Bob Hope is hired to present the event over the objections of Hope's wife Dolores, who is angered by Hope's affair with the winner of the 1961 edition.

The Miss World contestants arrive in the city. Among them are Pearl Jansen (Miss "Africa South"), who the organizers have included to deflect criticisms of collaboration with the Apartheid regime, and Jennifer Hosten (Miss Grenada). Jennifer and Pearl bond over their shared experience of anti-black racism. Jennifer also befriends Marjorie Johansson (Miss Sweden), the favourite, who confesses to feeling demeaned and exploited by the competition. Frustrated by the casual sexism she experiences at university, Sally hatches a plan to disrupt the live television broadcast of the Miss World contest by infiltrating the crowd. Several members of the group volunteer and buy audience tickets. Pearl privately confesses to Jennifer that the regime warned her that if she spoke out about the treatment of black South Africans she wouldn't be allowed to return home. Sally and her mother argue about Sally's activism and the toll her mother believes it's taking on Sally's daughter and her relationship with her partner Gareth.

A car bomb, attributed to the anarchist Angry Brigade, explodes outside the theatre hosting the event. Despite Gareth's pleas for Sally to call off the protest, she and Jo resolve to proceed. The competition begins, with the contestants, audience, organizers and Hope having to cross a picket line of protestors. Hope introduces the event with a series of sexist jokes. The judging panel whittles the number of contestants down to a final seven, among them Pearl and Jennifer. Jo and Sally's group start the protest by heckling Hope and flour-bombing the stage. Jo and Sally are arrested. The broadcast is temporarily halted but resumes shortly afterwards. Pearl wins second place before it is announced that Jennifer is Miss World - the first woman of colour to win. Backstage she has a conversation with Sally, who is being taken away by police, where they disagree over the protest.

A post-script explains that Jennifer went on to study Political Science and International Relations, later becoming Grenada's High Commissioner to Canada. Sally became Professor of Modern History at the University of London. Jo gave birth five months after the competition and later trained as a midwife. Pearl returned home to South Africa and became a singer after the fall of Apartheid. The protest succeeded in widely-publicising the women's liberation movement. The film finally notes that "Attempts to bring down the patriarchy remain ongoing."

== Cast ==
- Keira Knightley as Sally Alexander
- Gugu Mbatha-Raw as Jennifer Hosten, Miss Grenada
- Jessie Buckley as Jo Robinson
- Keeley Hawes as Julia Morley
- Phyllis Logan as Evelyn Alexander
- Lesley Manville as Dolores Hope
- Rhys Ifans as Eric Morley
- Greg Kinnear as Bob Hope
- John Heffernan as Gareth Stedman Jones
- Suki Waterhouse as Sandra Wolsfeld, Miss United States
- Ruby Bentall as Sarah
- Alexa Davies as Sue
- Lily Newmark as Jane
- Loreece Harrison as Pearl Jansen, Miss Africa South
- Clara Rosager as Marjorie Johansson, Miss Sweden
- Emma Corrin as Jillian Jessup, Miss South Africa
- Jo Herbert as Sheila Rowbotham
- Eileen O'Higgins as Joan Billings
- Luke Thompson as Peter Hain
- Miles Jupp as Clive
- Emma D'Arcy as Hazel
- Charlotte Spencer as Marjorie Jones
- John Sackville as Robin Day
- Rupert Vansittart as Lord Bly
- Collet Collins as Jennifer Wong, Miss Guyana
- Emily Tebbutt as Yvonne Ormes, Miss United Kingdom
- Misato Omori as Hisayo Nakamura, Miss Japan
- Monica Sarup as Heather Faville, Miss India
- Delly Allen as Georgina Rizk, Miss Lebanon
- Taina Haines as Sônia Guerra, Miss Brazil
- Greta Maria as Irith Lavi, Miss Israel
- Karin Carlson as Rosemarie Resch, Miss Austria
- Chiara King as Ana Maria Lucas, Miss Portugal
- Tashi Bullman as Valli Kemp, Miss Australia
- Zoe Purdy as Tuanjai Amnakamart, Miss Thailand
- Federica Mazzilli as Fátima Shecker, Miss Dominican Republic
- Thomas Smart as Roesmin Noerjadin, Ambassador of Indonesia to the United Kingdom
- Maya Kelly as Abigail Thaw
- Charlie Anson as Michael Aspel
- Clarence Smith as Sir Eric Gairy

== Production ==
The film was announced in October 2018, with Keira Knightley, Gugu Mbatha-Raw and Jessie Buckley set to star. Philippa Lowthorpe was set to direct. In November 2018, Lesley Manville, Greg Kinnear, Keeley Hawes, Rhys Ifans and Phyllis Logan had joined the cast of the film. In September 2018 Collet Collins joined the cast, and in January 2019 Suki Waterhouse and Clara Rosager joined.

=== Filming ===
Principal photography began in November 2018. Filming in the Crofton Park area of Lewisham in southeast London occurred in early January 2019.

== Release ==
The film was released in the United Kingdom on 13 March 2020. Shout Studios was named as the distributor in the United States. Due to the COVID-19 pandemic, the film's theatrical release was cut short, and the film was released early to video on demand in the United Kingdom on 15 April.

The movie was released on DVD in the United Kingdom by Walt Disney Studios Home Entertainment on 7 September 2020. As of 2021, Warner Bros. Home Entertainment was re-printing under licence from Pathé.

The film was inspired by an edition of the BBC Radio 4 series The Reunion, broadcast in September 2010.

== Reception ==
=== Box office ===
Misbehaviour grossed £347,643 in its opening weekend in the United Kingdom and a total of £455,088 locally and $2,024,073 worldwide.

=== Critical response ===
On Rotten Tomatoes, the film has an approval rating of 85% based on reviews from 95 critics, with an average rating of 6.7/10. The site's critics consensus reads: "Misbehaviour's overall arc will be familiar to fans of feelgood British cinema – and so will the way it triumphs over formula to tell a thoroughly crowd-pleasing story." On Metacritic, it has a score of 62, based on reviews from 15 critics, indicating "generally favourable reviews".

Richard Roeper wrote, "Following the playbook of 'The Full Monty,' 'Calendar Girls,' 'Military Wives,' et al., 'Misbehaviour' achieves just the right mix of farcical humor, dry wit and the obligatory dramatic moments when the light banter and sight gags give way to Poignant Confrontations reminding us there are serious undertones to this breezy romp."

Sheila O'Malley of RogerEbert.com of the film gave a mixed review. Though O'Malley praised screenwriters Rebecca Frayn and Gaby Chiappe for focusing on the intersecting stories of both the protesters and pageant competitors, she noted "it's treated as a given that pageants are sexist and gross, [yet] the scenes of pageant rehearsals plus the camaraderie of the contestants tells a different story. The separate storyline structure runs into trouble because these ideas don't have a chance to develop or take root."
