= Gaby Chiappe =

British screenwriter

Gaby Chiappe (born c. 1964) is a British screenwriter, known for her original works: television show The Level, and the films Their Finest and Misbehaviour. Prior to developing those, she worked extensively in commissioned British television, receiving praise and accolades for some of her stories. She has also acted, at university and in a small role in Their Finest.

== Early life and education ==
Chiappe was born in Gibraltar to Mary and William Chiappe. When she was three, the family moved to Brighton, England. Chiappe attended the Cardinal Newman Catholic School, where Mary was an English teacher and taught her daughter in the sixth form. Chiappe was then admitted to New Hall of the University of Cambridge, reading Archaeology. After her first year, she transferred to studying English Literature. At Cambridge, where she met future husband Dominic Gray, she "did as much acting as possible", and wanted to continue after graduating.

== Career ==
After graduating from Cambridge, Chiappe worked in fringe theatre for a decade. To make a living, she took up various jobs during that time, including what Gibraltar Magazine summarises as "teaching English as a foreign language, selling vintage clothes in Kensington market, reviewing plays, reading scripts and doing bits of journalism". As part of the theatre company Trouble and Strife she contributed to writing two plays. She also unsuccessfully tried to write a novel. However, she found that lifestyle unsatisfying and felt that her playwriting was not building a career. Chiappe and husband moved to Leeds in 1997. At the same time, she was offered the opportunity to write a trial script, like a writing audition, for television show Family Affairs, which a friend was working on. Chiappe got the job, and while she was writing commissioned scripts for the show, she realised that "script writing was the culmination of all that interested her".

Broadly speaking, I'd say the deadlines in film are less punishing; mainly because it is in development for so long and by the time you're shooting it, it's written. In television, you're often writing to production deadlines that are tight from the start [...] but it was the one-offs that were really hard to handle as these would involve going down to London [...] especially when the children were young. [...] However, being a screenwriter does, in the main, mean that you can do your work whenever you want.

— Gaby Chiappe

Chiappe worked on Family Affairs until 2002, in a busy work environment. After a few years as a working screenwriter, Chiappe got her first agent, Christine Glover, who had been recommended by a friend and who was still her agent in 2017. Regarding writing for television, Chiappe has said that she is a slow writer and meets the industry's strict deadlines only by working at all hours. From 2000 to 2015, Chiappe worked on various other soaps and television shows as a commissioned writer, and began developing her own series: The Level, which she co-created with Alex Perrin and which aired in 2016.

Writing for the Scottish drama Shetland, Chiappe and script executive Clare Batty wrote a difficult storyline about rape, which was received positively, and described as important and powerful, and not gratuitous. Chiappe had worked with the organisation Rape Crisis at their HQ in Leeds to develop the storyline. Chiappe and Batty were praised for their presented the subject.

Chiappe had starting working on her first feature film screenplay, Their Finest, an adaptation from the novel Their Finest Hour and a Half, in 2008 or 2009, and it was filmed five or six years later. (Note: Chiappe describes the writing and filming periods in relation to her eldest son's school age, corresponding to these approximate dates.) She also appears in a cameo in one of the World War II propaganda films shown in the film. In this process, Chiappe is said in Gibraltar Magazine to have "found there wasn't too big a difference between writing scripts for television and film". In 2017, Chiappe was adapting another novel, Dark Matter, for screenplay. She noted that she had more freedom to write a feature film and develop a television series as her children got older.

In 2018, the Writers' Guild of Great Britain released a report it had commissioned about gender inequality in screenwriting, simultaneously launching a campaign called Equality Writes, backed by various female writers, including Chiappe, and asking for an equal split of writers by 2020.

Expanding into more films, Chiappe co-wrote the 2020 film, Misbehaviour, with Rebecca Frayn, about the 1970 Miss World pageant and Women's liberation movement. In 2019, she was set to write for the Ed Rubin television development The Beast Must Die. During the COVID-19 pandemic, Chiappe was one of the writers who contributed to ITV's Isolation Stories.

In July 2025, it was announced that Chiappe would take over as head writer for the sixth series of Slow Horses, after the departure of Will Smith as showrunner.

== Filmography ==
Sources: Gibraltar Magazine; Film Stories; BIFA; WGGB

Year(s)	Work	Role	Notes
1997–2002	Family Affairs	Writer	45 episodes
2000–2003	Doctors	Writer	7 episodes (series 1 to 5)
2002–2004	EastEnders	Writer	9 episodes
2002–2005	Holby City	Writer	4 episodes (including a Christmas special crossover with Casualty)
2003–2005	Born and Bred	Writer	4 episodes (series 3 and 4)
2005–2007	Casualty	Writer	4 episodes
2007–2009	Survivors	Writer	2 episodes (series 1 and 2)
2007–2009	Lark Rise to Candleford	Writer	6 episodes (series 1 to 3)
2011–2012	Vera	Writer	2 episodes (series 2 and 3)
2012–2013	The Paradise	Writer	3 episodes (series 1 and 2)
2013–2015	Shetland	Writer	5 episodes (series 1 and 3); nominated for a British Academy Scotland Award
2016	Their Finest	Writer; cameo appearance	Original screenplay adapted from novel; nominated for the British Independent Film Award for Best Debut Screenwriter and the Writers' Guild of Great Britain Award for Best Screenplay
2016	The Level	Co-creator; co-writer	6-part series
2020	Misbehaviour	Co-writer	Original screenplay
2021	The Beast Must Die	Writer	6-part series
2026	Slow Horses	Writer	Head writer (series 6)
