= Vivian Burkhardt =

Grenadian model

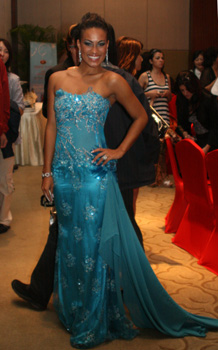
- Born: Vivian Charlott Burkhardt; January 24, 1986 (age 39); Germany
- Height: 1.70 m (5 ft 7 in)
- Beauty pageant titleholder
- Title: Miss Grenada 2007

Vivian Charlott Burkhardt (born January 24, 1986) is a Grenadian model and beauty pageant titleholder who represented her country at Miss World 2007 in Sanya, China where she placed as one of the semi-finalists. Having graduated from The TA Marryshow Community College with an associate degree in Natural Science, she has completed her studies as a pre-med student at St. George's University. She received her bachelor's degree in Basic Medical Science, and completed her MD at St. George's University.

Vivian, who is half Grenadian and half German, was born in Germany and moved to the island of Grenada when she was 15 years old. She is fluent in German and English and knows some French. Among her major interests are alternative energy and the environment.

== Miss Grenada World 2007 ==
Grenada won Miss World 1970 with Jennifer Hosten. On April 2, 2007 at Saint George's, in Grenada, in a pageant produced by Mrs. Hosten, Vivian Charlott Burkhardt was crowned Miss Grenada World 2007:

- Winner: Vivian Burkhardt
- 1st Runner up: Renee Moses
- 2nd Runner up: Crystal McLawrence
- 3rd Runner up: Michelle Minors
- 4th Runner up: Alyssa Bierzynski

The announcement was made before an audience at the G.B.S.S. Hon, Brenda Hood, Minister for Tourism and the Performing Arts, performed the official crowning ceremony.

Vivian also won two special awards: Miss Fitness and People's Choice.

== Event of Miss World 2007 ==
Grenada last participated in Miss World 1996 when Aria Johnson competed in India and the Seychelles.

Vivian represented Grenada at Miss World Contest in China in November 2007, together with 105 other contestants from all over the world. She placed among the top 16 semi-finalists. Earlier she had been named among the top 21 finalists for Miss World Beach Beauty fast-track event.

== Personal life ==
Vivian Burkhardt, has spent some time with Lewis Hamilton, an F1 driver for Mercedes. The couple spent time at Cannes where Vivian appeared on covers of magazines where she walked on the famed Red Carpet. After this period, she returned to the Caribbean for some family commitments.
