= Pearl Jansen =

South African beauty queen and singer (born 1950)

- Born: Pearl Gladys Jansen; 17 June 1950 (age 75); Bonteheuwel, Cape Town
- Title: Miss World 1970 (1st runner-up)

Pearl Gladys Jansen (sometimes spelled Janssen; born 17 June 1950 in Bonteheuwel) is a South African singer and beauty pageant titleholder who was first runner-up at the Miss World beauty contest in the United Kingdom in 1970. She was the first coloured woman to represent her country at the contest and competed as "Miss Africa South" due to apartheid.

== Biography ==
Jansen was born on 17 June 1950 to Alfred Martin Janssen and Selina Dorothy Abrahams. She was 20 when she entered the 1970 beauty contest. She has stated that after the contest nothing changed for her because of apartheid. At 58, she became a singer.

=== 1970 Miss World contest ===
The 1970 contest was held in London, United Kingdom. It began with a row because the organisers had allowed two entrants from South Africa, one black, Jansen, and one white, Jillian Jessup. During the event, women's liberation activists staged a protest and threw flour. Comedian Bob Hope was also heckled. Jennifer Hosten, Miss Grenada, won, becoming the first black woman to win Miss World. Jansen was first runner-up.

== Legacy ==
In the 2020 British comedy drama Misbehaviour about the 1970 Miss World pageant, Loreece Harrison portrays Jansen with a strong Afrikaans accent, which differs from Jansen's own Cape accent.
