= Dr. Phibes Rises Again =

1972 film by Robert Fuest

- Theatrical release poster
- Directed by: Robert Fuest
- Written by: Robert Blees; Robert Fuest
- Produced by: Louis M. Heyward
- Starring: Vincent Price; Robert Quarry; Peter Jeffrey; Valli Kemp; Fiona Lewis
- Cinematography: Alex Thomson
- Edited by: Tristam V. Cones
- Music by: John Gale
- Production company: AIP-England Ltd.
- Distributed by: MGM-EMI Distributors
- Release dates: July 5, 1972 (Fort Worth, Texas); October 15, 1972 (UK)
- Running time: 89 minutes
- Country: United Kingdom
- Language: English

Dr. Phibes Rises Again is a 1972 British comedy horror film directed and co-written by Robert Fuest. It is the sequel to The Abominable Dr. Phibes (1971), with Vincent Price reprising his role as the titular Dr. Anton Phibes. The cast also features Robert Quarry, Valli Kemp, Peter Jeffrey, Fiona Lewis, Hugh Griffith, Peter Cushing, Beryl Reid, Terry-Thomas, and Caroline Munro.

After seeking vengeance on the doctors whom he blamed for his wife's death in the first film, Phibes returns to seek eternal life in Egypt, while he pursues a centuries-old man who holds the ancient secrets that Phibes needs.

== Plot ==
Three years after the events of the previous film, Dr Anton Phibes emerges from suspended animation when the Moon enters into an alignment with the planets, the first such occasion after 2,000 years. Phibes prepares to take Victoria's body to the River of Life in Egypt, which promises eternal life for him and Victoria. However, his ancient papyrus map to the river has been stolen by Darius Biederbeck, a man who has lived for centuries through the regular use of a special elixir. After translating the papyrus, Biederbeck seeks the River of Life for himself and his lover Diana.

Phibes and his silent assistant, Vulnavia, enter Biederbeck's house, kill his manservant and reclaim the papyrus; they leave for Southampton to take a ship to Egypt. Biederbeck travels on the same ship with Diana and his assistant, Ambrose. When Ambrose discovers Victoria's body stored in the hold, Phibes kills him. His body is stuffed in a giant bottle and thrown overboard. Inspector Trout discovers the corpse when the bottle washes ashore near Southampton. He and Superintendent Waverley question shipping agent Lombardo; upon hearing the descriptions of Vulnavia, an organ and a clockwork band all being loaded aboard, they realize that Phibes is responsible.

Trout and Waverley pursue Phibes to Egypt, catching up to Biederbeck's archaeological party near the mountain housing the hidden temple containing the River of Life. Phibes, having set up residence inside the temple, hides Victoria's body in a secret compartment of an empty sarcophagus. He also finds the silver key that opens the gates to the River of Life. Phibes begins killing Biederbeck's men one by one. Biederbeck's team breaks into the temple and takes the sarcophagus and the key; Biederbeck takes the key for himself. Phibes uses a giant screw press to crush the man guarding the sarcophagus and a giant fan to simulate a windstorm, muffling his screams. The sarcophagus is retrieved.

Biederbeck is unmoved by the murders and insists on continuing. He sends Diana and Professor Hackett, the last remaining team member, back to England. Hackett is lured from his truck by Phibes' clockwork men impersonating British troops. When he returns to the truck, Diana is gone and he is sandblasted to death. His truck crashes into Biederbeck's tent.

Realizing Phibes must have taken Diana, Biederbeck confronts him in the temple. Phibes demands the key in exchange for Diana's life, claiming that when the gate is opened the water will drain out of Diana's trap and flow through the gate. Unable to free her from Phibes' water trap, Biederbeck surrenders the key. Phibes unlocks the gate to the River of Life, boats Victoria's coffin through it and summons Vulnavia to join them on the other side. Biederbeck returns to the gate as it closes, pleading through the bars for Phibes to take him along. Phibes ignores him. Diana attempts to comfort Biederbeck, but he rapidly ages and dies.

== Cast ==
- Vincent Price as Dr. Anton Phibes
- Robert Quarry as Darius Biederbeck
- Valli Kemp as Vulnavia
- Peter Jeffrey as Inspector Harry Trout
- Fiona Lewis as Diana Trowbridge
- Hugh Griffith as Harry Ambrose
- Peter Cushing as Captain
- Beryl Reid as Miss Ambrose
- Terry-Thomas as Lombardo
- John Cater as Superintendent Waverley
- Gerald Sim as Hackett
- Lewis Fiander as Baker
- John Thaw as Shavers
- Keith Buckley as Stewart
- Milton Reid as Cheng
- John Comer as Ship's Officer
- Caroline Munro as Victoria Regina Phibes
- Gary Owens as Narrator (voice) (uncredited)

== Production ==
Producer Heyward brought in Robert Blees to co-write the film. He felt Blees' sense of humour would serve a Phibes script well. According to Heyward, Blees and co-writer Robert Fuest, who also directed the film, had frequent disagreements about the script, forcing Heyward to mediate. Heyward said of the two writers' conflicts: "They were two men with great senses of integrity, but one protecting director's viewpoint and the other protecting writer's viewpoint."

American International Pictures (AIP) was grooming Robert Quarry as Vincent Price's replacement. It was rumoured that the two actors did not get on well, but Heyward said he did not notice any rift between them on the set. Quarry subsequently said that the studio had told him privately that he would replace Price when Price's contract ran out. According to Quarry, AIP had become disenchanted with Price, whose salary continued to rise despite his films' diminishing box office performance. In addition, Price was not particularly interested in working with the studio. AIP's plans were revealed to Price at a publicity event in England, when a publicist asked him how he felt about being replaced by Quarry. Quarry went on to say that while there was tension between him and Price on the set, it did not affect the production of the film. On the contrary, Quarry characterized the experience as "extremely pleasant. Our sense of humor was the one bond that made working with him a pleasure."

Director Robert Fuest, production designer Brian Eatwell (creator of the film's noted Art Deco settings), and composer John Gale all remained from The Abominable Dr. Phibes team. Price, Peter Jeffrey, and John Cater reprised their roles from The Abominable Dr. Phibes. Hugh Griffith and Terry-Thomas also appeared in both films, but played different characters. Caroline Munro appeared in both films as Victoria, Phibes' late wife, but in both films her role was limited to lying silently in a glass coffin. It was originally planned for Phibes to have a new assistant in the sequel, but the studio insisted that Vulnavia be retained, despite the fact that the character dies in the first Phibes film, and despite the unavailability of original Vulnavia actress Virginia North, who was pregnant at the time. Valli Kemp was cast as a replacement.

Although the film's budget was slightly higher than that of The Abominable Dr. Phibes, several elements of the original script had to be cut for budgetary reasons; for example, the pyramid was originally planned to have several levels of traps and be overrun with boiling oil at the end. The desert scenes were shot in Ibiza, Spain.

== Release ==
The film's U.S. release was slightly edited, cutting a few seconds each from some of the murder scenes in order to remove the most gruesome parts and allow the film to be released with a PG rating.

AIP solicited scripts for a third Phibes film, but Heyward said the studio never found one suitable. Proposed titles included Phibes Resurrectus, The Brides of Dr. Phibes, and The Seven Fates of Dr. Phibes.

== Reception ==
Variety wrote that Vincent Price "delivers one of his priceless theatric performances" and that producer Louis M. Heyward had "lined up a first-rate crew of technical assistants".

Gene Siskel of the Chicago Tribune gave the film one star, criticizing the "cheapness of the production" and the "unmotivated, mostly unimaginative" violence.

Kevin Thomas of the Los Angeles Times wrote, "Those who enjoyed the campy horror of last year's Dr. Phibes are in for a keen disappointment" and called the script "astonishingly slapdash".

Philip Strick of The Monthly Film Bulletin wrote, "It's refreshing to find a sequel that's better than its prototype. The return of the abominable Phibes, his pallor flushed with the success of his initial screen appearance, is accompanied both by a larger budget and, more to the point, by a greater display of confidence at all levels of the production".

At the film review aggregator website Rotten Tomatoes, 59% of 22 surveyed critics gave the film a positive review, with an average rating of 5.9/10. In Horror Movies of the 1970s, writer John Kenneth Muir described the film as "no better or worse than its predecessor".

In The Penguin Encyclopaedia of Horror and the Supernatural Kim Newman wrote: "Dr Phibes Rises Again lacks the gleeful insanity of the first film, but is far more achieved".

The Radio Times Guide to Films gave the film 3/5 stars, writing: "Vincent Price returns as the ingenious doctor, now in Egypt searching for the elixir of life, but continuing to outwit enemies with macabre murders, each grislier and funnier than the last. While it's not as splendid as The Abominable Dr Phibes, this sequel is mounted with lavish care by Robert Fuest, director of several classic episodes of The Avengers, and still scores high in the squirm and chuckle departments, thanks to Price's perfect timing and grandiose camp relish."

== Soundtrack ==
The film score by John Gale was released on Perseverance Records (PRD 002) on 20 March 2003.
