= Valli Kemp =

Australian model and actress (born 1950)

Valli Kemp (born 19 November 1950) is an Australian former model, actress, fashion designer, painter, teacher and beauty pageant titleholder. She is best known for her involvement in several high-profile beauty contests in the early 1970s, and for her role in the cult 1972 horror film Dr. Phibes Rises Again, in which she appeared opposite Vincent Price as the murderous doctor's silent assistant and accomplice, Vulnavia.

== Early life ==
By her own account, Valli Kemp was born in Kenya to British parents. and grew up as a tomboy running wild with her African mates in the jungles of Molo, Kenya, "land of the trees." She also lived in Nairobi until the Mau Mau Uprising of the 1950s, in which Kemp's father "lost everything" (as she later put it) and the family, including seven-year-old Kemp, relocated to London in 1957.

Kemp and her parents subsequently emigrated to Australia in 1962 when she was twelve years old, although her older brother George (eight years her senior) remained in England. The family settled in Sydney. Kemp, who had become interested in art while still a young child in Africa, left school at the age of fourteen and gained a position with Berlei Ltd, a prominent and long-established Australian firm of brassiere and corset manufacturers, where she worked on poster design and window dressing.

== Career ==
=== Modelling (1964-1970) ===
It was also at the age of fourteen (in 1964) that Kemp began her career as a model. At that age, she appeared in numerous TV commercials as well as a promotional video made by the Beach Boys for their song California Girls during their first tour of Australia in 1964. Kemp was later discovered by the publishers of the Australasian Post, an enduring and popular illustrated magazine, on which she appeared as a cover girl on no fewer than 27 occasions. In 1967, she was photographed alongside an American sailor on board a visiting destroyer, the USS Epperson. Her fame began to spread outside Australia as early as December 1969, when a revealing photograph of Kemp in a bikini ("in an old-fashioned check with braids and frills") was published in an Ohio newspaper.

Kemp's modelling profile rose steadily during 1970, when she entered the Quest of Quests, an annual beauty pageant sponsored by Waltons department store in Sydney, which, at that time, was Australia's most prestigious beauty contest. In July of that year, she was photographed on the arm of TV personality Graham Kennedy, attending a special a gala performance of the musical Hair, to celebrate the first anniversary of the show's Sydney premiere. Kemp was described in the press as "a stunning gypsy in a black dress with embroidered bodice and belt, set off with a brilliant scarf, hoop earrings and shiny red boots". Two months later, on 20 September, Kemp won the Quest of Quests and was duly crowned with the title of Miss World Australia in a ceremony held at the Wentworth Hotel. Later accounts of the Quest of Quests beauty contest noted that Kemp, with her "boudoir eyes and full lips", represented the epitome of early 1970s glamour.

In November 1970, Kemp travelled to London to represent Australia in the Miss World competition. Upon her arrival, she announced to the press that she hoped to make contact with her 27-year-old brother, George, whom she had not seen for seven years. After newspapers printed the story, her brother duly came forward and the two siblings were reunited. George Kemp reportedly quipped: "I work as a loader for BOAC, but I didn't recognise Valli when she came off the plane. My, she's changed for the better."

=== Film and TV (1969-1972) ===
According to Kemp herself, she was "discovered" by eminent Australian theatre director Robert Helpmann, who became her mentor during the early part of her career. Kemp's experience as a model allowed her to break into other media, and in addition to her numerous commercials, she obtained small roles in episodes of several Australian TV series including Riptide (first broadcast 1969) and You Can't See 'Round Corners (also 1969). Her first film appearance was in the Michael Winner film The Games (1970), starring Ryan O'Neal, which was filmed in Sydney.

After moving to London in 1970, Kemp gained more offers. In April of that year, it was reported that she had been signed to appear in the new James Bond film, Diamonds Are Forever, opposite Sean Connery and Jill St. John. However, this role fell through due to a management dispute. By her own account, Kemp also "amassed dozens of TV commercials" during this period, notably spots for Revlon and Lamb's Navy Rum.

== Dr Phibes films ==
In January 1972, it was reported by UPI that Kemp had been cast in a supporting role in the forthcoming sequel to The Abominable Dr. Phibes, which had starred Vincent Price in the title role and Virginia North as his silent assistant, Vulnavia. As the latter character had been killed off at the end of the first film, the draft screenplay for the sequel intended to introduce an entirely new character as Phibes' assistant. This was revised when the film studio, AIP, insisted that the name Vulnavia be retained. North had since become pregnant and was therefore unable to reprise her role, which prompted the casting of Kemp as a replacement. Kemp recalls that she was originally given a 10-year contract, as the producers were hoping to develop a Dr. Phibes franchise, with at least four subsequent films being proposed. This series did not eventuate.

During this time, Kemp also made several TV appearances, including the special Mike & Bernie's Show (1972), a semi-fictitious autobiography of comedian brothers Mike and Bernie Winters, who played themselves. At the time of her marriage in August 1973 (see below), Kemp was reported to be hosting her own TV programme in London.

== Further film roles ==
Notwithstanding the failure of the proposed Dr. Phibes franchise, she went on take small roles in several other films, including Rollerball (1975) (in which she had an uncredited role as a woman at a party) and The Great Muppet Caper (1981), in which she appeared as one of Lady Holiday's models. She lost a part in Mel Brooks' History of the World, Part I as she was in LA working.

In April 1981, Kemp announced her intention to return to Australia permanently, due to the "depressing state of the British film industry". She was quoted as saying: "The trouble is, in England I can make about one film a year, which I can hardly live on. The Australian movie and television business is really booming, so there will be no problem getting parts. I know most actresses try their luck in America, but I couldn't face that place." She later admitted to the Australian press that "comedy is what I like best, and I'd love to do some television work, maybe co-hosting a show."

== Art and fashion design ==
Shortly after moving to London, Kemp revived her earlier interest in painting. Her works during this period included a semi-abstract self-portrait, which was to be exhibited in a London discothecque. Kemp's talent for the visual arts received an unexpected boost while filming Dr. Phibes Rises Again in 1972, when her co-star Vincent Price, an art collector and art critic of some distinction, expressed interest in seeing her work. After doing so, he was sufficiently impressed to arrange for her to hold an exhibition in London, where she sold thirty paintings in two hours. She went on to become, as she put it, "an artist to the British show biz families". Amongst her celebrity clients were singer Des O'Connor, comedians Mike & Bernie Winters, musical entrepreneur Gordon Mills and TV presenter Michael Parkinson.

After returning to Australia in 1982, Kemp rented a house in the Sydney beachside suburb of Bondi and began working as a fashion designer. As she later told the press, "modelling and acting was a means of getting some money, but I think I'll get more designing – it's a daily job." In September 1984, she held her first fashion parade at Pronto, a popular restaurant and bar in the exclusive suburb of Double Bay.

Kemp continues to work as an artist and art teacher in Newcastle, New South Wales, north of Sydney.

== Personal life ==
While living in London in 1971, Kemp was reported to be romantically involved with pop singer Jonathan King.

In August 1973, Kemp married Robert Winsor, 32-year-old businessman who owned a point-of-sale company and who had been introduced to her only a few months earlier by actor Richard Johnson. Kemp herself had reportedly proposed to Winsor during a voyage on a friend's yacht on the Mediterranean. She had an engagement ring specially made to her own design – a ruby in a heart-shaped setting, surrounded by diamonds. The couple wed at the Registry Office at Totteridge, near London, where Winsor was in the process of erecting a large house.

The marriage lasted only 18 months, reportedly due to the stresses of Kemp's acting commitments. The couple divorced in 1975, but remained friends.

After Kemp returned to Australia permanently in 1985, she remarried and had three children.
