= Gordon White, Baron White of Hull =

British Baron and businessman

The Right Honourable The Lord White of Hull KBE

Member of the House of Lords
- In office 25 January 1991 – 23 August 1995

Personal details
- Born: Vincent Gordon Lindsay White; 11 May 1923
- Died: 23 August 1995 (aged 72)
- Spouses: Ann Elisabeth Kalen (m. 1958; div. 1968) Virginia North (m. 1974; div. 1991) Victoria Tucker (m. 1992)
- Children: 3

Vincent Gordon Lindsay White, Baron White of Hull, KBE (11 May 1923 – 23 August 1995), known as Gordon White, was co-founder with James Hanson of the British conglomerate Hanson plc and one of the most successful corporate raiders of the 1970s and 1980s known for his uncanny intuition and ruthless takeover tactics. He died in Los Angeles aged 72, leaving most of his £70 million fortune to his son Lucas.

== Early life ==
White attended De Aston School in Market Rasen, Lincolnshire. He was a Royal Air Force pilot during World War II in clandestine operations in India, Burma and Thailand. It was during the war that White became friends with Bill Hanson, British show-jumping star and younger brother of James Hanson.

Temperamentally and perhaps because of his wartime experiences, after the war White was more interested in having fun than working. Possessed of considerable panache, he set himself up as a Hollywood impresario in the early 1950s. He was a governor of the British Film Institute, 1982–84.

Bill Hanson died aged 27 of cancer, leaving his bereaved elder brother James with the duty of carrying on the Hanson business name. White became a surrogate brother to James; his ideas drove Hanson's takeover-driven success.

== Early career ==
In 1958, in one of their first business ventures together, he and James Hanson hit on the idea of importing jokey American greeting cards, then largely unknown in Britain. The business they created, trading as Hanson White, became one of Britain's largest suppliers of greeting cards, giftwrap and giftware and was sold to a management buy-out for £10.8m in 1997.

The pair's entry into large-scale business, and the world of takeovers, came through White's connection to Jim Slater, the accountant turned highly successful stock market trader who introduced them to the potential in public company shares. White and Hanson concentrated on emulating Slater's takeover techniques, building up a public company through acquisitions and disposals.

By 1964 he and Hanson had started to build up Hanson Trust out of the former Wiles Group. Hanson plc became one of the largest British-owned conglomerates, with annual profits of more than £1.5 billion and a strategy of growth through acquisition. From 1965 to 1973 White was deputy chairman of Hanson Trust Ltd.

== Personal life ==
In 1973 White left Britain for New York City where he developed Hanson's American holdings.

He married three times. His first marriage, to Elisabeth Kalen, the daughter of a Swedish diplomat, produced daughters Sita and Carolina, and the second, to British actress, Virginia North (whom he divorced in 1991), who gave him a son, Lucas. After the divorce he lived with a former model, Victoria Tucker, 40 years his junior. The couple married in a register office in Hamilton, Bermuda, in 1992.

He remained chairman of Hanson Industries North America, based in Iselin, New Jersey, from 1973 until his death.

Perhaps the most successful British buccaneer in America is the canny, soft- spoken Sir Gordon White, 64, chairman of Hanson Industries, the U.S. investing arm of London's Hanson Trust conglomerate. Hanson employs more than 35,000 workers in the eight U.S. firms it has acquired since 1973. Among the prizes: SCM, manufacturer of Smith-Corona typewriters, and Endicott Johnson, the shoe retailer. White's current target is Kidde, a maker of products ranging from Farberware kitchen utensils to Jacuzzi Whirlpool Baths. Hanson has made an offer for Kidde, and a successful deal would double the firm's U.S. employment roster. So far White has spent $2 billion on his acquisitions.

== Business ventures ==
Unlike Slater, White and Hanson survived the British slump in the early 1970s, but the "quantum leap" which had been promised to shareholders did not come until 1979, the beginning of the Margaret Thatcher era, which saw a move toward capitalism and a new respect for businessmen such as White and Hanson, who were not afraid to take on trade unions and break up established companies in pursuit of profit. In the 1970s and 80s White and Hanson turned the Hanson group into a multinational encompassing, amongst others, US chemical factories, UK electricity suppliers and Australian gold mines. The Hanson group's other products included batteries, cigarettes, cod liver oil capsules, cranes, golf clubs, Jacuzzis, timber and toys.

From 1979 to 1986, Hanson Trust stalked its prey on both sides of the Atlantic Ocean, acquiring a succession of ever-larger companies, often in hard-fought takeover battles planned and directed by White but fronted by Hanson. At this time White and Hanson were giving millions of pounds to the Conservative Party. Successful acquisitions included the Ever Ready company Berec, the retail group UDS, and finally Imperial Group which included hotels, the Courage (brewery) and Golden Wonder crisps.

At almost £2bn, the Imperial Group takeover set the record as Britain's biggest. It also set the record as the bitterest. The fight was a public one, through full-page newspaper advertisements; but behind the scenes private investigators sought, unsuccessfully, to prove allegations of criminal activities in US side of business which was White's domain.

The fight for Imperial took its toll. In 1986 The Times focused on a controversial attempt to take £70 million from the Courage brewery pension fund. In the City there was speculation as to how the takeover juggernaut could keep going with its aim to acquire ever-larger targets, and as Hanson and White passed normal retirement age there was speculation as to their succession plans. Neither had any intention of stepping down, but attempts to continue the proven method were, not surprisingly, becoming more difficult not least as the class of possible targets got smaller.

Then there was the issue of the pair's political connection. In November 1990, Thatcher was ousted as prime minister, seriously weakening the pair's political support. Perhaps as a consolation prize, White was given a life peerage in the resignation honours list (Hanson had been made a life peer in 1983). Prior to being created a life peer with the title Baron White of Hull, of Hull in the County of Humberside on 25 January 1991, White had been appointed Knight Commander of the Order of the British Empire (KBE) in the 1979 Birthday Honours. The reduction in political support, signalled by Thatcher's resignation and honours notwithstanding, was the beginning of the end of the pair's takeover career.

In 1991 White and Hanson bid for Imperial Chemical Industries ("ICI"), one of the commanding heights of British industry, in what was supposed to be the ultimate takeover. Apart from being symbolic of Britain's manufacturing and research base, ICI had plants and offices all over Britain, which made it a highly political issue for the many members of parliament whose constituents might be affected - including several in marginal Tory seats. Had they succeeded, White and Hanson may have acquired some of ICI's respectability with which to veneer their own wheeler-dealer reputation. On guard, ICI caused White and Hanson deep embarrassment when it revealed that White was not on Hanson's board and had spent and lost several million pounds of company money on his passionate interest in racehorses. ICI also showed that White and Hanson ran a string of offshore companies in tax havens. Furthermore, Hanson's son Robert, having been identified as the pair's likely successor, had been put in charge of the bid and had been shown to be naïve, dealing a severe blow to White and Hanson's succession plans. Their reputations now seriously damaged, White and Hanson had to withdraw before a formal takeover for ICI could be launched.

At the time of White's death in 1995, the climate in which the Hanson group operated had changed as investors looked beyond the conglomerate to single-sector companies. Hanson plc is now a British-based international building materials company, headquartered in London.

=== Horse racing ===
White's horse Legal Case (b.c. 1986) won the Champion Stakes G1 in 1989 (jockey: R Cochrane; trainer: L Cumani). Reference Light (USA) won the Anzio Maiden Stakes (Div II)(2yo) in 1989 at Redcar (trainer: Sir Michael Stoute; jockey: WR Swinburn) and Evasive Prince (USA) won the EBF Willow Maiden Stakes (Div I)(2yo) at Lingfield in 1990 (trainer: Sir Michael Stoute; jockey: WR Swinburn). White entered two horses in the Jersey Stakes (Group 3)(3yo) at Ascot in 1990: Bold Russian which came second (trainer: BW Hills; jockey: Michael Hills); and Qui Danzig (USA) which came third (trainer: Sir Michael Stoute; jockey: WR Swinburn).

== Legacy ==
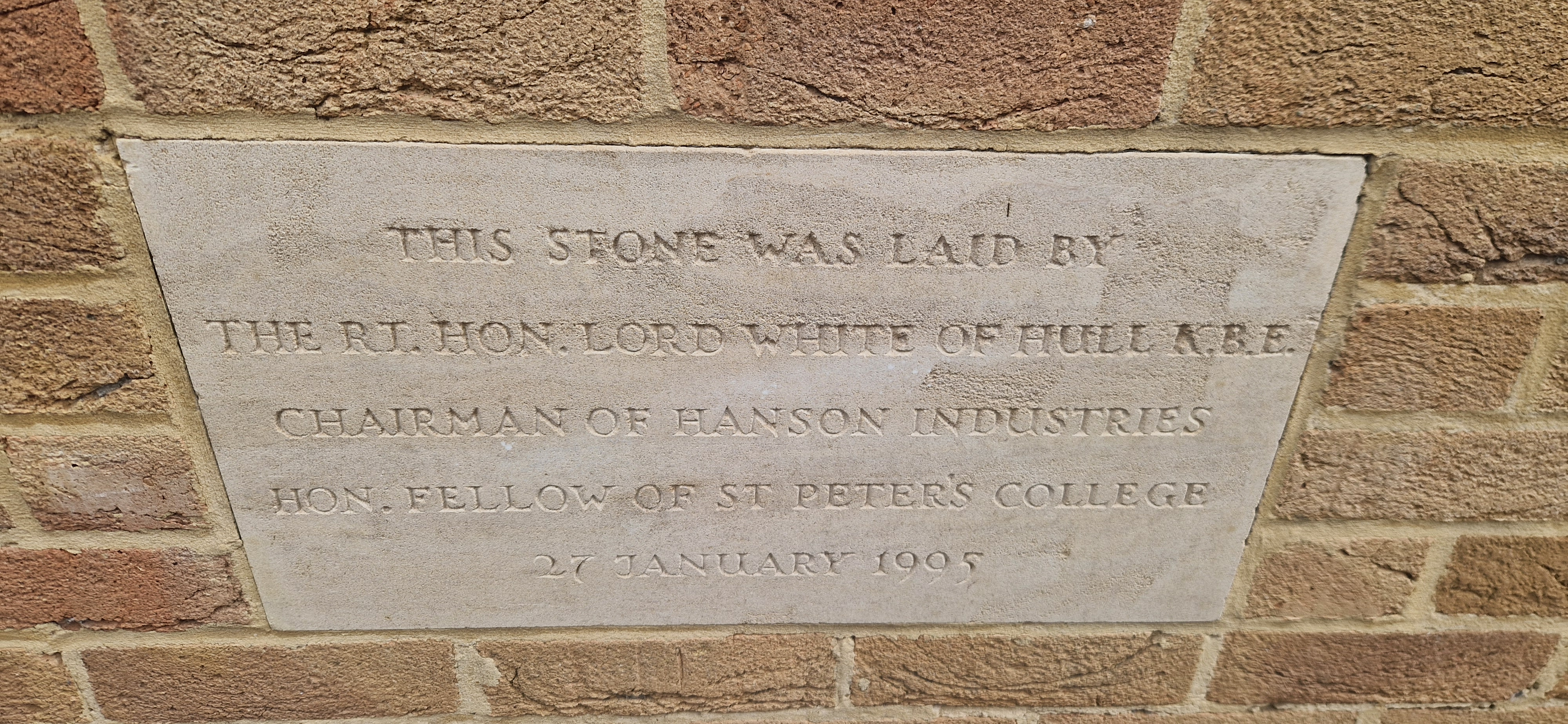
Foundation stone of the Lau Building, a new annexe in Tidmarsh Lane for St Peter's College, Oxford. This stone was laid in 1995 by Lord White, who was an Honorary Fellow of that College

Hanson and White were controversial figures who, critics asserted, were devoted to a quick profit. Such was their fame, or notoriety, that White (then Sir Gordon) was written into the script of the 1987 film Wall Street, as the character 'Sir Larry Wildman', in which he was played as a cold-blooded money-making machine by actor Terence Stamp.

== Family ==
On 15 May 2004, White's daughter Sita, aged 43, died suddenly during a yoga class in Santa Monica, following years of financial troubles. Married three times, she was the mother of a daughter, Tyrian Jade (born June 1992). Tyrian became a subject of a legal dispute in 1997 when a California court declared Imran Khan as the father without a DNA test. Khan denied paternity and willed for a paternity test in Pakistan, stating he would accept the decision of the Pakistani courts. Prior to Sita's death, Jemima Khan, Khan's wife at the time was designated as Tyrian's legal guardian by Sita in her will. After her death, Khan stated that Tyrian would be welcome to join their family in London, leaving the decision entirely up to her, given her established relationship with his and Jemima's sons.

== Arms ==
Coat of arms of Gordon White, Baron White of Hull

Notes
Crest granted 20th December 1983, supporters granted 10th March 1992.
Coronet
A Coronet of a Baron
Crest
Issuing out of a circlet of roses Argent barbed and seeded Proper set upon a rim Or an American Eagle's head proper and a lion's head addorsed Or.
Escutcheon
Azure an equestrian figure in plate armour brandishing a sword in bend sinister his helm crested by a plume of five ostrich feathers his horse salient and with trapper and chaffron all Argent and within a bordure of the last charged with thirteen mullets Azure.
Supporters
Dexter a bear Proper sinister a Lion Or on the head of each a Baron's coronet Proper.
Motto
Alta Peto
