= Bonteheuwel =

Coloured township in Cape Town

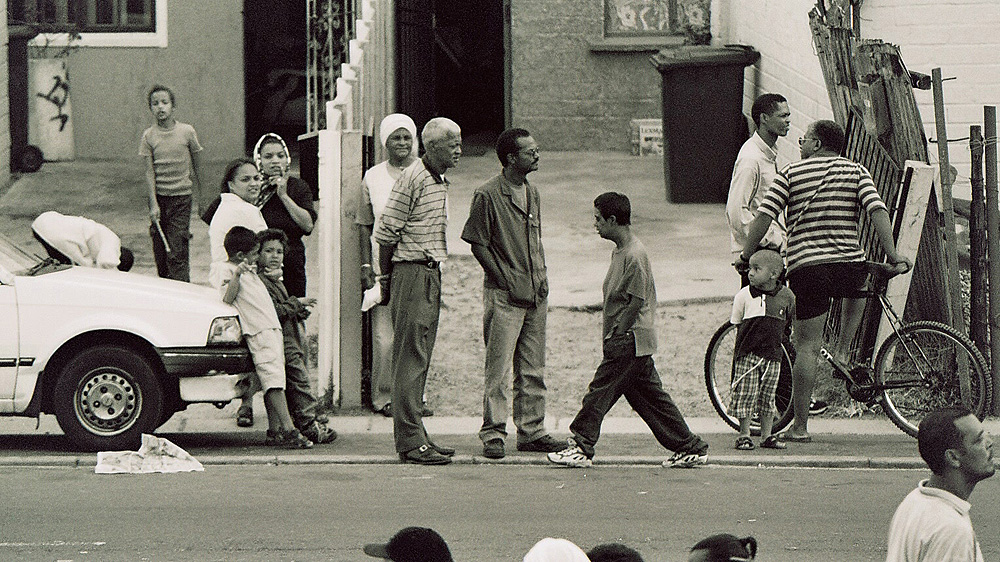
- Street scene in Bonteheuwel

- Location within Western Cape Location within South Africa
- Coordinates: 33.951°S 18.554°E
- Country: South Africa
- Province: Western Cape
- Municipality: City of Cape Town
- Main Place: Athlone

Area
  - Total: 3.55 km^{2} (1.37 sq mi)

Population (2011)
  - Total: 45,967
  - Density: 12,900/km^{2} (33,500/sq mi)

Racial makeup (2011)
  - Black African: 3.1%
  - Coloured: 95.3%
  - Indian/Asian: 0.4%
  - White: 0.1%
  - Other: 1.1%

First languages (2011)
  - Afrikaans: 67.0%
  - English: 31.4%
  - Other: 1.6%
- Time zone: UTC+2 (SAST)
- PO box: 8925
- Area code: 7764

Bonteheuwel is a former Coloured township in Cape Town in the Western Cape province of South Africa.

The 1st and only Mosque was established in 1964. Some of the people that served on the Committee or was involved:

The 1st Imaam was Imaam Achmat Mohammed The Imaam at the madressa was also Boeta Hakkie, Imaam Ismail Frielaar Boeta Ebrahim Tape, Boeta Tape Frederick, Boeta Ebrahim Petersen, Boeta Ismail Abrahams (Boeta Patty), Rashied Sayed, Boeta Armien Scott, Boeta Armien Jassiem, Boeta Abdullah Leeman, Boeta Ebrahim Fisher (kifaayt klops), Boeta Toyer Hendricks, Boeta Ebrahim January, Hadjie Memmet, Boeta Ismail Suleiman known as Boeta Coo-ee

== Famous people ==
- Pearl Jansen
- Ashley Kriel
