= Yutte Stensgaard =

Danish actress

- Born: Jytte Stensgaard; 14 May 1946 (age 80); Thisted, Jutland, Denmark
- Occupation: Actress
- Years active: 1968-1972
- Spouses: Tony Curtis (m. 1967; div. 1971) John Kerwin (m. 1974; div. 1982) Paul Walter (m. 2012)
- Children: 1

Yutte Stensgaard (born 14 May 1946) is a Danish actress born in Thisted, Jutland, Denmark, best known for her starring role in Hammer's Lust for a Vampire (1971).

== Career ==
Born Jytte Stensgaard, she moved to the United Kingdom to improve her English in 1963. She worked as an au pair, studied stenography and became a model for a time. Stensgaard began her acting career in the film La Ragazza con la pistola (The Girl with the Pistol, 1968). She then played parts in diverse UK TV-series: The Saint (1968; episode: "The Desperate Diplomat"); Broaden Your Mind (1969); Doctor in the House (1969/70) – in which she played the recurring role of Helga, Dave Briddock's girlfriend; On the Buses (1970; episode: "The New Uniforms", as Ingrid, a Swedish tourist); Special Branch (1970; episode: "Miss International" as Nina Sareth); sci-fi comedy series The Adventures of Don Quick (1970; as Flosshilda); Jason King (1971; as Arlene in the episode "As Easy as A.B.C."); The Persuaders! (1971; playing Bibi, a Judo instructress who assists Danny Wilde (Tony Curtis) in the episode "The Morning After"); The Marty Feldman Comedy Machine (1972), and anthology series Dead of Night (1972; as Gertrude Wickett in the episode "Bedtime").

Her film parts include the Bulldog Drummond film Some Girls Do (1969) as Robot One; she played small parts in If It's Tuesday, This Must Be Belgium (1969), Scream and Scream Again (1970) and Doctor in Trouble (1970). She also appeared in the low-budget sci-fi sex comedy Zeta One (1969).

Stensgaard's most famous role is that of the vampire Carmilla/Mircalla in Hammer's Lust for a Vampire (1971). The film was the sequel to The Vampire Lovers (1970), which had starred Ingrid Pitt as Mircalla. The original film was an adaptation of Carmilla by Joseph Sheridan Le Fanu. However, Lust for a Vampire shared little with the novel; it only used the vampire characters, and was thus a completely new story. In the film, the bisexual Carmilla infiltrates an all-girl boarding school while falling in love with a novelist.

Stensgaard auditioned for the part of the Doctor Who companion Jo Grant, alongside third Doctor Jon Pertwee in 1970. Towards the end of her career she appeared in pantomime and the stage-farce Boeing-Boeing (1971). She also appeared on TV as a hostess on the popular game show The Golden Shot hosted by Bob Monkhouse.

== Personal life ==
Stensgaard has married three times: first to art director Tony Curtis; second to John Kerwin. She left acting in 1972, went to live in the US and had a son. She became a Christian and for years worked at a radio station selling air-time and refusing to discuss her acting career. She married Paul Walter in June 2012 in Oregon. She was tracked down by a Danish horror fan, Nicolas Barbano, and eventually agreed to an interview (which appeared in Video Watchdog). Soon after, she was guest of honour at a horror convention.

Stensgaard's image continues to feature on the covers of numerous book and magazine publications; for instance, Marcus Hearn's book Hammer Glamour (2009), which contains a chapter on her.

== Selected filmography ==
- The Girl with the Pistol (1968)
- Zeta One (1969)
- Some Girls Do (1969)
- If It's Tuesday, This Must Be Belgium (1969)
- Carry On Again, Doctor (1969) (uncredited role)
- Scream and Scream Again (1970) - Erika
- Doctor in Trouble (1970) - Eve (Model)
- This, That and the Other (1970) - Taxi Girl
- The Buttercup Chain (1970) - Ullah
- Carry On Loving (1970) - Mrs. Roxby (scenes deleted)
- Lust for a Vampire (1971) - Mircalla / Carmilla Karnstein
- Burke & Hare (1972) - Janet
