= Their Finest =

2016 film directed by Lone Scherfig

- British theatrical release poster
- Directed by: Lone Scherfig
- Screenplay by: Gaby Chiappe
- Based on: Their Finest Hour and a Half by Lissa Evans
- Produced by: Elizabeth Karlsen; Amanda Posey; Stephen Woolley
- Starring: Gemma Arterton; Sam Claflin; Bill Nighy; Jack Huston; Helen McCrory; Eddie Marsan; Jake Lacy; Rachael Stirling; Richard E. Grant
- Cinematography: Sebastian Blenkov
- Edited by: Lucia Zucchetti
- Music by: Rachel Portman
- Production companies: Wales Screen; Pinewood Pictures; BBC Films; Ingenious Media; HanWay Films; Ripken Productions; Film i Väst; Filmgate Films; Wildgaze Films; Number 9 Films; Cutting Edge Group
- Distributed by: Lionsgate
- Release dates: 10 September 2016 (TIFF); 21 April 2017 (United Kingdom)
- Running time: 117 minutes
- Country: United Kingdom
- Language: English
- Box office: $12.3 million

Their Finest is a 2016 British war comedy-drama film, directed by Lone Scherfig, written by Gaby Chiappe, and based on the 2009 novel Their Finest Hour and a Half by Lissa Evans. The film stars Gemma Arterton, Sam Claflin, Bill Nighy, Jack Huston, Jake Lacy, Richard E. Grant, Henry Goodman, Rachael Stirling, Eddie Marsan, Amanda Root, Helen McCrory, and Claudia Jessie. It tells the story of a British Ministry of Information film team making a morale-boosting film about the Dunkirk evacuation during the Battle of Britain and the London Blitz.

Principal photography began in early September 2015 in London. Their Finest was screened at the 2016 Toronto International Film Festival, and was released in the UK on 21 April 2017 by Lionsgate.

The film is set during the time after Dunkirk, when the Battle of Britain is turning into the Blitz. The British government is desperately seeking to shore up the morale of the general population, and is pursuing a long strategy of getting the US to join the war and defeat Hitler. The Ministry of Information used artistic talent to pursue these ends.

== Plot ==
In London in 1940, Catrin Cole is hired by the Ministry of Information to help write scripts for propaganda films. Her male colleagues need her to craft realistic dialogue for female characters, but they pay her less than a man's wage and refuse to credit her. Her husband Ellis – a war artist, Spanish Civil War veteran, and volunteer air raid warden – seems indifferent to her achievement in getting the job.

Catrin is sent to interview two twins named Lily and Rose Starling, who supposedly participated in the Dunkirk evacuation. They tell her that they never reached Dunkirk because their boat broke down, although they did take on soldiers from an over-crowded tug returning the other way, causing newspaper reporters to believe they had come from the combat zone. After Ellis tells her he cannot afford to keep them living in London, Catrin lies to the Ministry and claims that the Starlings did reach Dunkirk. Her boss Roger Swain is impressed and greenlights the film, with Catrin seconded to the production company with extra pay.

While German bombs fall on London night after night, a viable script quickly takes shape, despite frequent arguments between the writers about factual accuracy versus artistic license and the needs of wartime propaganda. Catrin particularly clashes with Tom Buckley, who repeatedly belittles her contributions and tries to sideline the female characters in favour of male heroes. She is reassured by Phyl Moore, one of the few other women on the film. A fading actor named Ambrose Hilliard initially refuses to be in the film, until his agent dies in an air raid and is replaced by the agent's sister Sophie. Catrin is nearly caught in a bomb blast, and vomits after seeing a dead body.

Swain discovers that the Starlings did not reach Dunkirk, but is persuaded by the writers that the new story expresses a greater truth. Buckley covers for Catrin by claiming it was the twins who lied. The Secretary of State for War adopts the film as a way to build public support for Britain in the United States, ordering the writers to create a role for a real-life American flying ace. Meanwhile, Ellis is commissioned to document bomb damage far outside London, and is hurt when Catrin refuses to drop her job and go with him. She promises to attend his subsequent exhibition in London.

Filming begins in Devon. The American pilot turns out to be an abysmal actor, and the production is only saved by Catrin's interventions. Catrin and Buckley grow closer, as he begins to respect her work and she warms to his dark sense of humour. Discussing the difference between reality and fiction, Buckley recalls how the First World War broke his father's spirit, and argues that stories help people by giving them a sense of structure and closure.

The extra work means Catrin misses the opening of Ellis's exhibition and must rush back to London to catch its final day. Before leaving, she reveals to Phyl that she and Ellis are not married but pretend to be for propriety. In London, she walks in on Ellis having sex with another woman and storms out, snarkily rejecting his pleas and returning to Devon.

Buckley has found out about Catrin's non-marriage, and on a moonlit night he denounces Ellis and proposes to her. She refuses, prompting an argument. Back in London, the film's American distributors demand an ending with more "oomph", but Buckley is in a romantic funk and fails to write anything satisfactory. Catrin spends all night writing the ending, then types out a mock script returning to the night of their quarrel and providing a meaningful resolution that they could not find in the moment. In the morning, she finds her home has been destroyed by a bomb.

At the studio, some staff are missing due to air raids. Buckley and Catrin talk and reconcile. As he walks away, a lighting rig collapses on him and crushes him to death. Catrin is devastated, but manages to resolve one final plot hole – all the male actors who could shoot a missing scene are injured or unavailable, so one of the (fictional) Starling twins finally gets to save the day – before going into seclusion. Hilliard is also injured, and is visited in hospital by his new agent Sophie with offers of work and an offer to let him recuperate in her home.

The film, named The Nancy Starling after the Starling twins' real-life boat, is a hit, though Catrin misses the premiere. The real Starlings tell her the film has inspired them to run away from their bully of a father and join the ATS. Afterwards, Hilliard visits Catrin to enlist her help with a new film about air raid wardens, but she says she cannot write any more and breaks down crying. He comforts her, saying that they have been allowed to contribute their talent because young men are dying on the front lines. On his advice, she goes to the cinema to see The Nancy Starling and is moved both by the film and the audience's reactions. She returns to the scriptwriters' office to work on the new picture.

== Cast ==
The main story

- Gemma Arterton as Catrin Cole, screenwriter
- Sam Claflin as Tom Buckley, screenwriter
- Jack Huston as Ellis Cole, Catrin's husband
- Helen McCrory as Sophie Smith, Sammy's sister
- Eddie Marsan as Sammy Smith, Ambrose Hilliard's agent and Sophie's brother
- Rachael Stirling as Phyl Moore, executive from the Ministry of Information
- Richard E. Grant as Roger Swain, head of film at the Ministry of Information
- Paul Ritter as Raymond Parfitt, screenwriter
- Jeremy Irons as Secretary of War
- Henry Goodman as Gabriel Baker, film producer
- Michael Marcus as Alex, the Director
- Natalia Ryumina as Muriel, Ellis’ friend
- Lily Knight as Rose Starling
- Francesca Knight as Lily Starling
- Rebecca Saire as Mortuary Nurse

Actors in Carrot Film

- Gaby Chiappe as Dolly
- Amanda Fairbank-Hynes as Mabel

Actors in "The Nancy Starling"

- Bill Nighy as Ambrose Hilliard, the luvvie playing Uncle Frank
- Jake Lacy as Carl Lundbeck, the American soldier playing Brannigan
- Claudia Jessie as Doris Cleavely, the young actress playing Lily Starling
- Stephanie Hyam as Angela Ralli-Thomas, the young actress playing Rose Starling
- Hubert Burton as Wyndham Best, the actor playing Johnnie, Rose's boyfriend

== Production ==
On 14 April 2015 it was announced that Gemma Arterton, Sam Claflin, and Bill Nighy would star in the World War II–set romantic comedy film based on the 2009 novel Their Finest Hour and a Half by Lissa Evans. BBC Films developed the film, hiring Lone Scherfig to direct the film which was adapted by Gaby Chiappe. BBC Films would co-finance the film, which Number 9 Films and Wildgaze Films would produce with its Stephen Woolley and Amanda Posey, while HanWay Films would handle the international rights. On 10 September 2015 Jack Huston and Jake Lacy joined the film along with Richard E. Grant, Helen McCrory, Eddie Marsan, Rachael Stirling, and Henry Goodman. The production was financially supported by the Welsh Government's "Media Investment Budget".

=== Filming ===
Principal photography on the film began in early September 2015, in London and Wales. Locations used included: in Pembrokeshire, Freshwater West beach – which stood in for Dunkirk – Porthgain harbour, the Trecwn valley, and the Cresselly Arms at Cresswell Quay; in Swansea, the Guildhall and Grand Theatre; and in London, Bedford Square in Bloomsbury.

== Release ==
In May 2015, Lionsgate acquired UK distribution rights to the film. The film had its world premiere at the Toronto International Film Festival on 10 September 2016. Shortly after, EuropaCorp acquired the distribution rights to the film in the United States and France. STX Entertainment distributed the film for EuropaCorp.

On 13 October 2016, Their Finest celebrated its European premiere at the BFI London Film Festival. The film was scheduled to be released in the United States on 24 March 2017 but was pushed back to 7 April 2017. It was released in the United Kingdom on 21 April 2017.

== Critical response ==
On the review-aggregator Rotten Tomatoes, the film has an approval rating of 90%, based on 174 reviews, with an average rating of 7.20/10. The site's critical consensus reads, "Carried along by a winning performance from Gemma Arterton, Their Finest smoothly combines comedy and wartime drama to crowd-pleasing effect." On Metacritic, the film has a score of 76 out of 100, based on 30 critics, indicating "generally favorable reviews".

Peter Bradshaw of The Guardian called the character of Hilliard "a colossally proportioned scene-stealer" and wrote that "Arterton brings a rather beautiful kind of restraint to her role". Wendy Ide of The Observer praised the "rattling, screwball rhythm" of Catrin and Tom's "banter" but noted that some of the plot could have been "more persuasively developed" and that without the twist of Tom's death the film "could have torpedoed itself with predictability". She praised that twist as the film's "boldest decision... [which robs] the audience of an outcome we are expecting in a way that nobody sees coming", as well as calling the "film-within-a-film structure ... a neat device".

Geoffrey Macnab of the Independent wrote that "Some of the in-jokes begin to grate" but called Arterton's performance "well-judged and engaging" and noted the "scene-stealing antics" of Nighy, Lacy and Irons, particularly lauding Hilliard's shift from "comic buffoon ... [to] depth and pathos". Robbie Collin of the Telegraph called it a "handsome, rousing, rigorous entertainment you can't help but play along with" and "Sparklingly adapted", with "bristly chemistry" between the two leads. He noted Scherfig's direction, with the "broad and rosy spoof" of the film-within-a-film and the gender inequalities of the period left "to squirm away unhindered in the subtext" rather than countered with anachronistic "spiky comebacks".
