= Corinna Tsopei =

Greek actress and Miss Universe 1964

- Κυριακή Τσοπέη
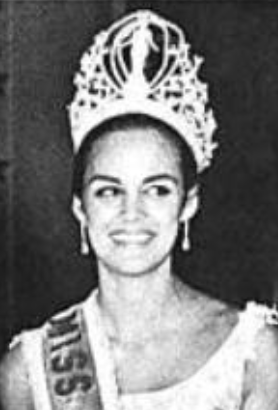
- Kiriaki Tsopei, from a 1964 publication of the United States Air Force
- Born: Kyriaki Tsopei; 21 June 1944 (age 82); Athens, Greece
- Spouses: Steven Zax (m. 1968; div. 1978) Freddie Fields (m. 1981; died 2007)
- Children: 3
- Beauty pageant titleholder
- Title: Miss Star Hellas 1964; Miss Universe 1964
- Hair color: Black
- Eye color: Brown
- Major competitions: Miss Star Hellas 1964 (Winner); Miss Universe 1964 (Winner)

Kyriaki "Corinna" Tsopei (Greek: Κυριακή (Κορίννα) Τσοπέη; born 21 June 1944) is a Greek actress, model and beauty queen who won Miss Universe 1964.

== Career ==
On 20 June 1964, Tsopei was crowned Miss Star Hellas by Miss Star Hellas 1963, Despina Orgeta. She moved on to represent Greece at the Miss Universe 1964 pageant in Miami, Florida, where she beat out Miss England, Miss Israel, Miss Sweden, and Miss Republic of China to be crowned Miss Universe, bringing the title to Greece for the first time. She has since returned several times to judge the pageant.

After completing her reign as Miss Universe, she went on to pursue a brief movie career, making five uncredited or minor appearances (including "Girl in Cage" in Caprice, "Telethon telephone operator" in Valley of the Dolls, and "Tennis Girl" in The Sweet Ride) in 1967 and 1968, before appearing in her only prominent role as the love interest of the lead character in A Man Called Horse (1970). Tsopei also guest-starred in a 1967 episode of the television series Lost in Space ("Castles in Space") and a 1968 episode of Daniel Boone.

Apart from her beauty pageant work and acting career, Tsopei also is a chair of an organisation for children with leukemia.

== Family ==
Tsopei was born on June 21, 1944, to George and Maria Tsopei. Her father, George (1914–1997), was a Greek Army major, originally from Mani in the Peloponnese. She has one brother, Basil, and one sister, Despina.

Tsopei was married twice. Her first marriage was to Beverly Hills plastic surgeon, Dr. Steven Zax, from 1968 to 1978. Tsopei's three sons were born to the couple during this marriage: Andrew, Steven, and Paris Zax.

Tsopei's second marriage was to Hollywood theatrical agent and movie producer Freddie Fields, brother of band leader Shep Fields, from 1981 until his death from lung cancer in December 2007.

Tsopei resides in Los Angeles, California, but pays frequent visits to Greece to visit relatives.

Awards and achievements
Preceded by (Brazil) Iêda Maria Vargas	Miss Universe; 1964	Succeeded by (Thailand) Apasra Hongsakula
