= Miss Venezuela 1964 =

11th edition of the Miss Venezuela competition

- Date: May 27, 1964
- Venue: Teatro Paris (La Campiña) Caracas, Venezuela
- Broadcaster: RCTV
- Entrants: 17
- Placements: 5
- Winner: Mercedes Revenga; Miranda

Miss Venezuela 1964 was the 11th edition of Miss Venezuela pageant held at Teatro Paris (now called Teatro La Campiña) in Caracas, Venezuela, on May 27, 1964. The winner of the pageant was Mercedes Revenga, Miss Miranda.

The pageant was broadcast live by RCTV and entertained by Los Melódicos.

== Results ==
=== Placements ===
- Miss Venezuela 1964 - Mercedes Revenga (Miss Miranda)
- 1st runner-up - Mercedes Hernández (Miss Portuguesa)
- 2nd runner-up - Lisla Silva (Miss Zulia)
- 3rd runner-up - Gloria Pesquera (Miss Bolívar)
- 4th runner-up - Hildegarth Rodríguez (Miss Nueva Esparta)

== Contestants ==
- Miss Aragua - Eva Rodríguez
- Miss Barinas - Olga Mergarejo Rosales
- Miss Bolívar - Gloria Pesquera Rodríguez
- Miss Carabobo - Cecilia Castellanos
- Miss Departamento Libertador - Zulay Felice
- Miss Departamento Vargas - Marlene Salas Marrero
- Miss Distrito Federal - Magaly Villegas
- Miss Falcón - Lupe Foata
- Miss Guárico - Elina Leal Monteagudo
- Miss Lara - Marlene Veracoechea
- Miss Miranda - Mercedes Revenga De La Rosa
- Miss Monagas - Irma Añez Muñoz
- Miss Nueva Esparta - Hildegarth Rodríguez Velásquez
- Miss Portuguesa - Mercedes Hernández Nieves
- Miss Táchira - Alba Gómez Chacón
- Miss Trujillo - Judith Romero
- Miss Zulia - Lisla Silva Negrón
