= Some Girls Do =

1969 British film by Ralph Thomas

- UK cinema quad poster
- Directed by: Ralph Thomas
- Written by: David D. Osborn; Liz Charles-Williams
- Based on: Bulldog Drummond by Sapper; Gerard Fairlie
- Produced by: Betty E. Box
- Starring: Richard Johnson; Daliah Lavi; Beba Lončar; James Villiers; Ronnie Stevens; Vanessa Howard; Maurice Denham; Sydne Rome; Virginia North; Robert Morley
- Cinematography: Ernest Steward
- Edited by: Ernest Hosler
- Music by: Charles Blackwell
- Production companies: The Rank Organisation; Ashdown Film Productions/Pinewood Studios
- Distributed by: J. Arthur Rank Film Distributors (UK)
- Release date: 23 January 1969 (UK)
- Running time: 91 minutes
- Country: United Kingdom
- Language: English

Some Girls Do is a 1969 British comedy spy film directed by Ralph Thomas. It was the second of the revamped Bulldog Drummond films (following 1967's Deadlier Than the Male) starring Richard Johnson as Drummond, made following the success of the James Bond films of the 1960s. (Note: Johnson was the original choice for the role of James Bond.) Some Girls Do even featured a white Aston Martin DB6 Volante, manufactured by the same marque used by Bond.

In the film, the criminal mastermind Carl Petersen attempts to delay the production of a supersonic airliner through acts of murder and sabotage. Petersen is using female robots (fembots) with electronic brains as weapons for his cause.

== Plot ==
A series of inexplicable accidents befall the development of the world's first supersonic airliner, the SST1 – a man falls victim to a homicidal air stewardess and two women perform separate acts of sabotage during tests. The Air Ministry calls on Hugh "Bulldog" Drummond to investigate.

Aided by ditzy American blonde Flicky, Drummond uncovers a plot by criminal mastermind Carl Petersen, who stands to gain eight million pounds if the aircraft is not ready by a certain date. Petersen, assisted by beautiful but deadly assassins Helga and Pandora, has developed a number of robots: beautiful girls with electronic brains to help him sabotage the SST1 project by means of infrasound (sound waves with too low frequency to be detected by the human ear) which can be directed at people or objects with devastating results.

After the initial sabotage attacks by Peterson's robots, Helga and Pandora begin systematically murdering various people associated with the SSTI, such as engineer Dudley Mortimer and Miss Mary, a spy who runs a cooking class as a front for his activities. Helga makes contact with Drummond at a shooting party, and attempts to kill him by planting a bomb in his telephone after sleeping with him. Then Helga and Pandora try to kill Drummond again by crashing into his glider. The ripcord from his parachute was sabotaged but Drummond manages to manually open his parachute and escape death.

The trail leads Drummond to North Africa, following up on a lead on an infrasound-powered powerboat, where he is assisted by Peregrine Carruthers from the British Embassy. Pandora kills the boat owner with a miniature infrasound device, but is thwarted in her attempt to steal the boat. Drummond and Peregrine decide to drive the powerboat in a scheduled race: Helga and Pandora also participate in the race and successfully capture the men and the boat, delivering them all to Petersen at his island headquarters, staffed by an army of his female robots, including the defective but endearing No. 7. Drummond and Peregrine are also reunited with Flicky, who has successfully infiltrated Petersen's organisation.

Over dinner, Petersen reveals the full details of his plan to use infrasound technology to sabotage the SST1's maiden flight. That night, Drummond sleeps with Helga once more, while Pandora contents herself with seducing Peregrine. In the morning, Drummond attempts to retrieve the infrasound powerboat and is met by Flicky, who tells him she is actually a CIA agent assigned to help him. They are caught by Helga – Drummond escapes but Helga holds Flicky at gunpoint. Petersen sends his robots to search the island for the runaway agent – Drummond is cornered by No. 7, but to his surprise, she deliberately chooses not to reveal his location.

Peregrine and Flicky are held hostage in Petersen's control room and are forced to witness the SST1's destruction as he puts his plan into action. Drummond scales the wall of Petersen's hideout, and saves the SST1 from destruction by using Petersen's infrasound waves against him, destroying his control room. Petersen, Pandora and Helga are all apparently killed in the explosion.

Drummond, Flicky, Peregrine and No. 7 escape the subsequent mayhem, having retrieved the infrasound device. Flicky reveals herself to be a double agent working for the Russians and escapes on the powerboat with the device. Peregrine, wanting to improve his Russian relations, decides to go with her. As the base finally explodes, Drummond finds comfort in the arms of the beautiful No. 7, who turns out not to be a robot after all.

== Cast ==
- Richard Johnson as Hugh "Bulldog" Drummond
- Daliah Lavi as Baroness Helga Hagen
- Beba Lončar as Pandora
- James Villiers as Carl Petersen
- Vanessa Howard as robot No. 7
- Maurice Denham as Dudley Mortimer
- Robert Morley as Miss Mary
- Sydne Rome as Flicky
- Ronnie Stevens as Peregrine Carruthers
- Virginia North as robot No. 9
- Adrienne Posta as Drummond's Daily
- Florence Desmond as Lady Manderley
- Nicholas Phipps as Lord Dunburry
- Yutte Stensgaard as robot No. 1
- George Belbin as Major Newman
- Richard Hurndall as president of aircraft company
- Marga Roche as Birgit
- Doug Sheldon as Kruger
- Joanna Lumley as robot No. 2 (uncredited)
- Maria Aitken as flight attendant (uncredited)
- Shakira Caine as robot observer (uncredited)
- Johnny Briggs as air traffic controller (uncredited)
- John Paul as test pilot (uncredited)
- Dora Graham as robot twin (uncredited)
- Doris Graham as robot twin (uncredited)
- Peter Brace as a Petersen Bodyguard (uncredited) and stunts

== Production ==
Filming began May 1968 and took place mainly in Spain. One of the British filming locations was the National Gas Turbine Establishment at Farnborough. It was known as "Pyestock". The locale doubled for the British Atomic plant where the engines and wind tunnel models of the fictional SST1 were being tested. Wycombe Air Park was also used as a location in the film for the glider sequence.

Joanna Lumley, Maria Aitken, Yutte Stensgaard and Virginia North appear as some of Petersen's female robots in the film, Lumley and Aitken going uncredited. North and Lumley were also working on the set of On Her Majesty's Secret Service at the same time, as both films were produced at Pinewood Studios.

== Reception ==
The Monthly Film Bulletin wrote: "Bulldog Drummond would turn in his grave if he could see what has happened to him in this inane sequel to Deadlier than the Male. The spy spoof died a lingering death some time ago, but Betty Box and Ralph Thomas seem not to have heard the news. The result is a crude mishmash of tired jokes ("I say, do remember you're British," says Drummond's mother-fixated buffoon of a bodyguard), second-hand gadgetry, and a tedious collection of giggly, mini-skirted female assassins. Even the glossy surface looks decidedly jaded, as though the producers had taken over some of the less inventive sets from a Matt Helm film. And the script's desperate attempts to camp it up (Robert Morley drifting embarrassingly through as a cookery specialist with flower-patterned shirt and an earring, Carl Petersen dressing for dinner as the Duke of Wellington) completely misfire."

The New York Times was especially scathing, calling Some Girls Do an "... addlepated distant cousin of James Bond... Richard Johnson, (stars as) the glum Drummond of this mishmash of an intrigue ...

Reviewer Leslie Halliwell dismissed the film as an "... abysmal spoof melodrama in the swinging 60s mould; a travesty of a famous character." Filmink called it "far less fun" than Deadlier Than the Male.

== See also ==
- James Bond parodies
