= Ashley Kriel =

South African activist

- Born: Ashley James Kriel; 17 October 1966; Bonteheuwel, Cape Town; South Africa
- Died: 9 July 1987 (aged 20); Athlone, Cape Town
- Cause of death: Shot by the South African Police
- Occupation: Student
- Known for: Anti-apartheid activism

Ashley Kriel (17 October 1966 – 9 July 1987) was a South African anti-apartheid activist who was killed by police in Cape Town on 9 July 1987 for his role in the anti-apartheid movement. In 1999, the Truth and Reconciliation Commission granted Jeffrey Benzien amnesty for his part in the killing.

== Life ==
Kriel was born on 17 October 1966 in Bonteheuwel, a working-class township on Cape Town's Cape Flats. He was born to parents Ivy and Melvin Kriel, with two older sisters, Michel Assure and Melaney Adams. His upbringing was impacted by the families that were forcibly removed from District 6 housing, establishing Bonteheuwel as a "colored" designated area by way of the Group Areas Act of 1950.

He was an active student in high school as he was a part of various groups. He was a founding member of Bonteheuwel Inter-Schools Congress (BISCO), where members would coordinate activities of student councils in surrounding schools. Members of BISCO would also study apartheid tactics, mobilize for grassroots resistances, and call out police corruption and brutality. He was also a member of the Cape Youth Congress (CAYCO), where he played a role in mobilizing students to oppose the apartheid by holding rallying calls. He became a leader for the Bonteheuwel youth, despite still being a teenager. He contributed to the organization of the youth into school boycotts, protests, and other actions.

Kriel was forced to go into exile at the age of 18 after receiving attention from the special police. He joined the Bonteheuwel Military Wing (BMW), which is the armed wing of the African National Congress (ANC) and was founded by other underground militants. There, he received assistance from members of Umkhonto we Sizwe (MK) and ANC to move throughout borders in secret. He also received housing from an old teacher of his at a safe house in Athlone.Many radicals from Bonteheuwel believed in ideologies rooted in praxis. Kriel was a pioneer in advancing the logic that revolutions must initially be ideological before they can be practiced on the streets.

== Death and funeral ==
On 9 July 1987, Jeffery Benzien, who served as Security Branch Operative, assassinated Kriel in his safe house in Athlone. The circumstances around Kriel's death have never been clearly established.

Benzien claims that Kriel answered the door to who he thought were municipal workers, but were disguised special police. The police went on to arrest Kriel for allegedly having a grenade in his possession. When the policemen were handcuffing Kriel, he accidentally shot himself in the back with a pistol Benzien claimed Kriel concealed under a towel after he attempted to scuffle with the policemen. Benzien was subsequently granted amnesty for his involvement in Kriel's death and other apartheid-era crimes by the Truth and Reconciliation Commission (TRC).

Forensic investigator David Klatzow, who was hired by Kriel's family, claimed that Kriel's wounds weren't from a close contact gunshot, but aligned with the belief that the shot was fired from afar when Kriel was already in handcuffs. He believed that the story given by the special police to the TRC and in court were lies made with the purpose of covering up the true nature of Kriel's death, as the original image of the crime scene displayed Kriel's corpse with his wrists in handcuffs, in front of the safe house with the pistol and grenade that the police claimed that Kriel was in possession of. He claimed that it was impossible for Kriel to shoot himself in the back when he was already placed in handcuffs, and the shooter had to have been standing at a distance. Klatzow also believed that it was a norm for police to plant evidence at crime scenes to convey message that the victim was committing acts of terrorism. Kriel's sister, Michel Assure, claimed that he was tortured as she visited the house after his death and found blood inside and outside of the house, as well as a spade.

Kriel's funeral was attended by many, as the masses carried his casket into the Anglican Church of Resurrection, but mourners were attacked by South African police with tear gas and rubber bullets.

== Legacy ==
On his release from prison in February 1990, Nelson Mandela acknowledged Ashley Kriel's sacrifice for the anti-apartheid struggle in his speech in Paarl.

Michel Assure, Ashley Kriel's sister, continues to push for reparations and the truth surrounding her brothers death, as there are still unaddressed inconsistencies from the trial. She believes that the truth was diluted in order to grant his killers amnesty.

The Institute for Justice and Reconciliation and the University of the Western Cape created the annual Ashley Kriel Memorial Youth Lecture in his memory, which takes place near the anniversary of his assassination at Bontehewuel High School, the school Ashley Kriel attended. This lecture memorializes Kriel by sparking conversations on topics of youth leadership with annual themes, such as "My Voice, Our Story." The event also acknowledges progress made among the current youth.

=== The Ashley Kriel Youth Leadership Development Project ===
The establishment of this project was inspired by Cape Town youth leader Ashley Kriel, who was killed by the apartheid regime in the 1980s. His legacy is recognized as a symbol of students and youth activists from Cape Flats in the 1980s and the potential that the youth has to create change.

The program involves youth that are in high school, college, or newly graduated without employment. The program holds workshops that inform applicants on topics of youth activism, history, memory, and how it pertains to the past versus the present. Applicants start off by attending a 5-day camp where they can bond and share their stories and personal experience, then they reconvene once a month over the span of six months. By connecting a cross-section of youth from different societies, the project aims to develop young future leaders and assist them in leaving a positive impact on their peers with their exeperiences.

=== Memory Box Initiative ===
Projects are combined to focus on the fostering of conversation and the sharing of personal narratives and community histories in Worcester, as means of furthering reconciliation and the impact on the IJRs Ashley Kriel Youth Leadership Development Project and Schools' Oral History.

The project aims to provide a platform whereby stories of community members in Worcester can be explored through different aspects of Arts and Theatre-based activities that create space for dialogue, peace-building, social justice and public participation.

The key element throughout the projects is the closing of the generational gap between youth and generations from different eras within the community's history, including the former anti-apartheid activists with the aim of encouraging the connection between the two eras by sharing experiences and memories.

== Documentary ==
Action Kommandant, which is a documentary film based on the life story of Ashley Kriel, was released in 2016. The film was directed by Nadine Cloete. The documentary highlighted Ashley Kriel's life as a grassroots activist, while simultaneously bringing attention to the daily struggles of revolutionaries that were a part of the underground ANC. Action Kommandant contextualized Kriel's life with interviews with his mother, Ivy Kriel, containing scenes of life in the Cape Flats in the 1980s, and embedding footage from Kriel's childhood to provide background to Kriel's character.
