= Mercedes Revenga =

Venezuelan model

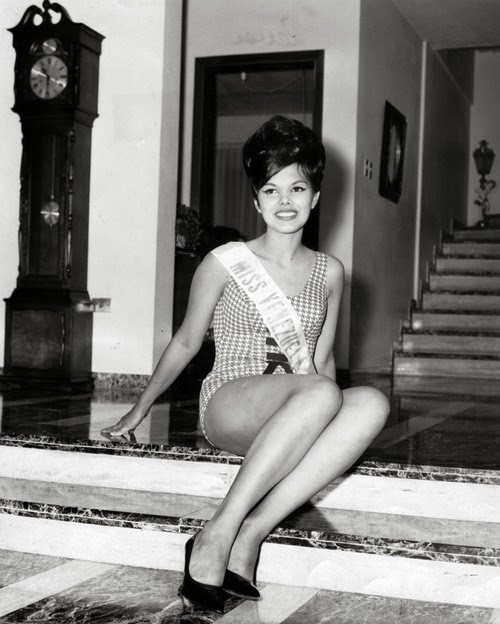
- Born: Sonia Mercedes Revenga de la Rosa; January 21, 1946 (age 80); Caracas, Venezuela
- Height: 1.65 m (5 ft 5 in)
- Beauty pageant titleholder
- Hair color: Black
- Eye color: Black
- Major competitions: Miss Venezuela 1964 (Winner); Miss Universe 1964 (Top 15); Miss International 1964 (Top 16)

Sonia Mercedes Revenga de la Rosa (born January 21, 1946) is a Venezuelan model and beauty pageant titleholder who was crowned Miss Venezuela 1964 and was the official representative of Venezuela to the Miss Universe 1964 pageant held in Miami Beach, Florida, United States on August 1, 1964 when she classified in the Top 15 semifinalists. She also competed at Miss International 1964.

Preceded by Irene Morales	Miss Venezuela; 1964	Succeeded by María de las Casas
