= The Level (TV series) =

2016 British TV crime drama series

- Genre: Thriller
- Written by: Gaby Chiappe; Alexander Perrin
- Directed by: Mark Everest; Andy Goddard
- Starring: Karla Crome; Laura Haddock; Lindsey Coulson; Rob James-Collier; Noel Clarke; Amanda Burton; Joe Absolom; Geoff Bell; Lorne MacFayden; Gary Lewis
- Composer: Jack Arnold
- Country of origin: United Kingdom
- Original language: English
- No. of series: 1
- No. of episodes: 6

Production
- Executive producers: Polly Leys; Kate Norrish
- Producer: Jane Dauncey
- Running time: 60 minutes (including advertisements)
- Production company: Hillbilly Films

Original release
- Network: ITV
- Release: 30 September – 4 November 2016

The Level (stylized as THE LEVꓱ⅃) is a British crime drama television series, which began broadcasting on ITV on 30 September 2016. The six-part series focuses on DS Nancy Devlin (Karla Crome), a detective with the National Crime Division, who is assigned to Brighton CID to investigate the murder of Frank Le Saux (Philip Glenister), a corrupt businessman with whom she has been associated in the past. Having been present at the scene of the murder, Nancy struggles to keep her involvement in the case a secret, whilst working under the watchful eye of boss DCI Michelle Newman (Lindsey Coulson). The series was predominantly filmed in and around the streets of Brighton. The series received consistent viewing figures throughout its run, and actress Karla Crome has suggested the possibility of a second series.

== Cast ==
Main cast

- Karla Crome as DS Nancy Devlin, National Crime Division
- Laura Haddock as Hayley Svrcek, Frank's daughter
- Lindsey Coulson as DCI Michelle Newman, East Sussex Police
- Rob James-Collier as DS Kevin O'Dowd, National Crime Division
- Noel Clarke as DS Sean 'Gunner' Martin, East Sussex Police
- Amanda Burton as Cherie Le Saux, Frank's wife
- Joe Absolom as Shay Nash, corrupt businessman and Hayley's ex
- Geoff Bell as Duncan Elliot, partner of Le Saux haulage
- Lorne MacFayden as Darryl Quinn, Frank's right-hand man
- Gary Lewis as Gil Devlin, Nancy's father and former detective

Recurring characters

- Philip Glenister as Frank Le Saux, corrupt businessman
- Jane Hazlegrove as DC Gayle Vincent, East Sussex Police
- Cian Binchy as Tate Le Saux, Frank's son
- Suzanne Packer as Teresa Devlin, Nancy's mother
- Kelly Harrison as Delia Bradley, Frank's lover
- Rupert Procter as Theo Ketler, Frank's accountant

== Plot ==
One night, Frank Le Saux (Philip Glenister), a corrupt businessman, arranges to meet DS Nancy Devlin (Karla Crome), a National Crime Division detective who has been protecting him from prosecution on several occasions. However, their meeting is cut short when they are interrupted by the arrival of an unknown gunman. Frank is shot dead, and Nancy receives a wound from a ricochet. The Brighton CID of East Sussex Police are assigned to investigate the case. Boss DCI Michelle Newman (Lindsey Coulson) arranges for DS Devlin to be assigned to the case, unaware of her being present at the scene of the murder. Devlin is paired with DS Sean 'Gunner' Martin (Noel Clarke), but the pair have constant friction. After the attempted murder of a customs agent the National Crime Division assign Nancy's fellow NCD detective Kevin O'Dowd (Rob James-Collier) to the case.

Nancy struggles to hide her involvement in Frank's activities. Her friendship with Frank's daughter, Hayley (Laura Haddock) makes her situation increasingly difficult. However, it soon transpires that the blight of the team's investigation appears to a mole within their ranks. Nancy suspects that Gunner may be the leak, but during a late-night visit to O'Dowd's hotel room, she discovers a series of surveillance photos that disappeared earlier in the day. Whilst trying to deal with the pressures of the investigation, Nancy is forced to help her mentally ill mother, Teresa (Suzanne Packer), but soon discovers that her mum has been shielding a life-changing secret for twenty years - that Nancy is secretly Frank's daughter.

=== Episodes ===
==== Series 1 (2016) ====
No.	Title	Directed by	Written by	Original release date	UK viewers (millions)
1	"Episode 1"	Andy Goddard	Gaby Chiappe & Alexander Perrin	30 September 2016	4.87
Nancy Devlin, a detective with the National Crime Division, is present when haulier and drugs trafficker Frank Le Saux is shot and murdered. Later, DCI Michelle Newman, who assigned to the case, seconds Nancy from the NCD to her unit within Brighton CID to assist with the investigation. Nancy, caught between a rock and a hard place, struggles with the increasing pressure as she is forced to hide her involvement in the case from the team.
2	"Episode 2"	Andy Goddard	Gaby Chiappe & Alexander Perrin	7 October 2016	4.17
Forced to hide the CCTV from the chemist which proves she was the second person present at the Le Saux murder scene, Nancy's behaviour starts to become more and more erratic. Suspicion falls upon Le Saux's accountant, Theo Ketler, after the Le Saux family discover he has embezzled all of Frank's money out of the company. Gunner's suspicions of Nancy's involvement continue to grow, while Kevin uncovers some new vital information.
3	"Episode 3"	Andy Goddard	Gaby Chiappe & Alexander Perrin	14 October 2016	3.99
When evidence from the surveillance operation disappears, Nancy suspects that a mole is operating within the team and sets about trying to discover their identity. Her initial suspicions fall on Gunner, and breaks into his flat, to find evidence. Later seeking solace in Kevin, she finds the missing evidence hidden in his hotel room. She is unaware, however, that Kevin has caught on to her discovery of his betrayal.
4	"Episode 4"	Mark Everest	Gaby Chiappe & Alexander Perrin	21 October 2016	4.16
Newman decides to send Nancy undercover to pose as a corrupt cop, in order to get inside Elliot's operation. Nancy, however, is unaware of the situation she is letting herself into when Elliot's first task for her is to ride shotgun on a planned firebomb attack on Le Saux's yard. Meanwhile, Elliot enlists Kevin's help in creating a distraction when the missing Le Saux truck is found abandoned on a nearby coast road.
5	"Episode 5"	Mark Everest	Gaby Chiappe & Alexander Perrin	28 October 2016	3.74
Nancy's undercover operation comes to a head as Elliot asks her to create a gap in the surveillance window in order for him to ferry the missing truck back into the haulage yard. Kevin, however, has already warned Elliot that Nancy is undercover, and when Elliot goes against the agreed plan, Gunner realises Nancy is in danger. Meanwhile, Nash makes a complaint against Nancy, forcing Newman to have no other option but to suspend her.
6	"Episode 6"	Mark Everest	Gaby Chiappe & Alexander Perrin	4 November 2016	3.99
With Nancy suspended, she decides to dig further into Nash's operation, and she discovers that the 'Goldmine' is not the stash of guns as the team first thought, but pallets of fake medical supplies destined for a buyer within the NHS trust. Having discovered that Nash wasn't responsible for Frank's death, Nancy sets about discovering the real identity of the killer, but her investigation leads her to realise that Hayley is in grave danger.
