= Miss Universe 1964 =

13th Miss Universe pageant

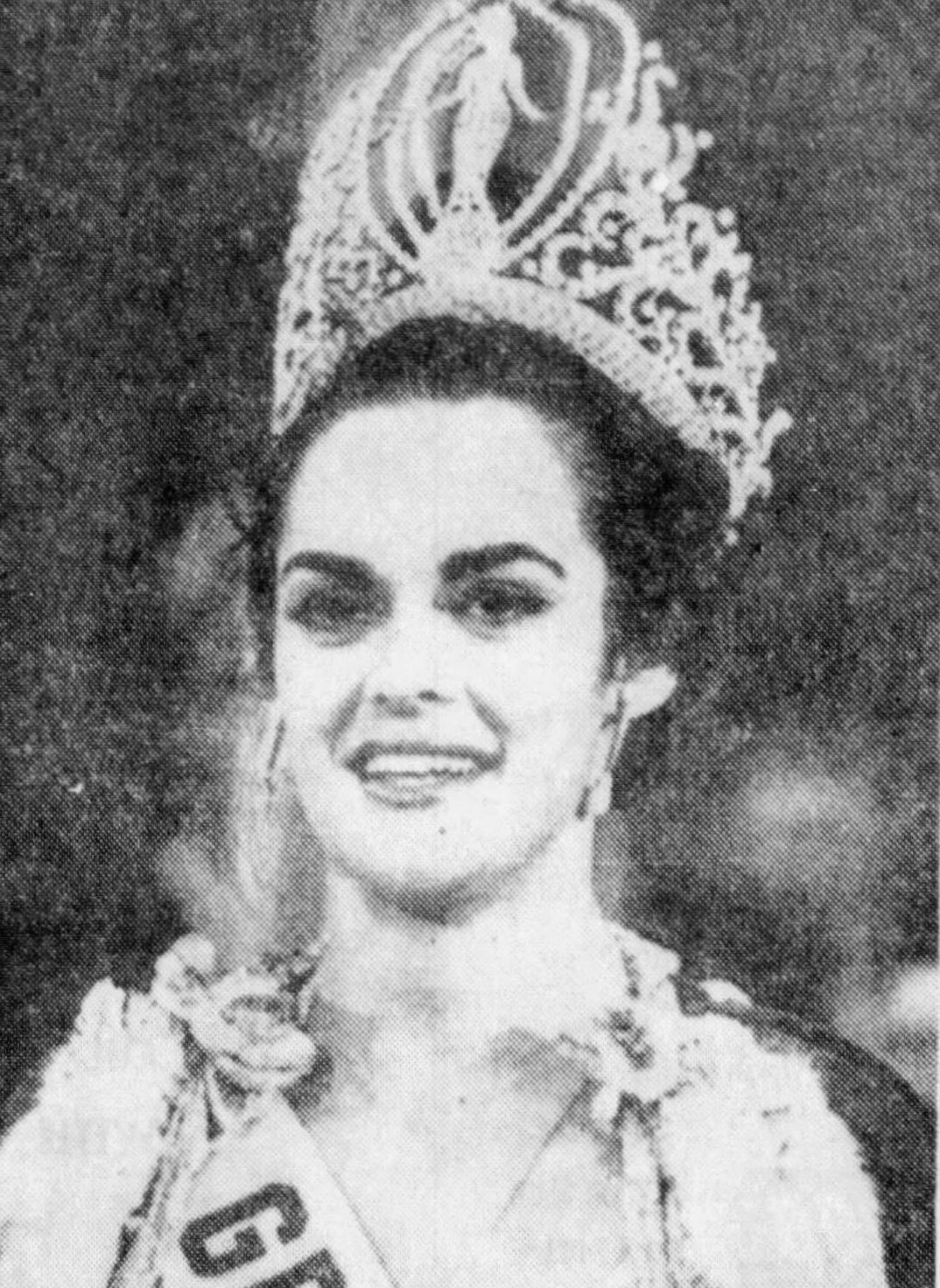
- Corinna Tsopei
- Date: 1 August 1964
- Presenters: John Daly; Arlene Francis; Jack Linkletter
- Venue: Miami Beach Convention Hall, Miami Beach, Florida, United States
- Broadcaster: CBS
- Entrants: 60
- Placements: 15
- Debuts: Aruba; Grenada; Nigeria; Saint Vincent
- Withdrawals: Cuba; Morocco; Nicaragua
- Returns: Australia; Chile; England; Hong Kong; India; Malaysia; Panama; Republic of China; Tunisia
- Winner: Corinna Tsopei; Greece
- Congeniality: Jeanne Venables (California)
- Best National Costume: Henny Deul (Holland)
- Photogenic: Emanuela Stramana (Italy)

Miss Universe 1964 was the 13th Miss Universe pageant, held on at the Miami Beach Convention Hall in Miami Beach, Florida, on 1 August 1964.

At the conclusion of the event, Iêda Maria Vargas of Brazil crowned Corinna Tsopei of Greece as Miss Universe 1964. It is the first victory of Greece in the history of the pageant.

Contestants from sixty countries and territories competed in this edition. The pageant was hosted by Jack Linkletter, while Arlene Francis and John Daly served as backstage correspondents.

== Background ==
=== Selection of participants ===
Contestants representing sixty countries and territories were chosen to participate in the pageant. Two candidates was appointed to represent her country to replace the original dethroned winner.

==== Replacements ====
Wendy Barrie was appointed to represent Scotland after the original Miss Scotland, Doreen Swan, withdrew from the competition to marry her fiancé James Alexander Do Watt Nicoll. Swan was subsequently reported missing, and the FBI suspected she had been abducted.

Miss Luxembourg 1964, Gaby Heyard, was also set to compete in the pageant, but was replaced by Miss Elegance Mariette Stephano for undisclosed reasons.

==== Debuts, returns, and withdrawals ====
This edition saw the debuts of Aruba, Grenada, Nigeria, and Saint Vincent, and the returns of India, which last competed in 1952; Panama in 1954; Australia in 1958; Tunisia in 1960; Chile in 1961; and England, Hong Kong, Malaysia (as Malaya), and the Republic of China in 1962. Cuba, Morocco, and Nicaragua withdrew after their respective organizations failed to hold a national competition or appoint a delegate.

Vera Wee of Singapore as Singapore is still part of Malaysia until October 1965, and instead competed at Miss Malaysia 1964 where she finished as a runner-up to Angela Filmer. Ulla Donastorg of the United States Virgin Islands was also set to compete, but withdrew for undisclosed reasons.

== Results ==
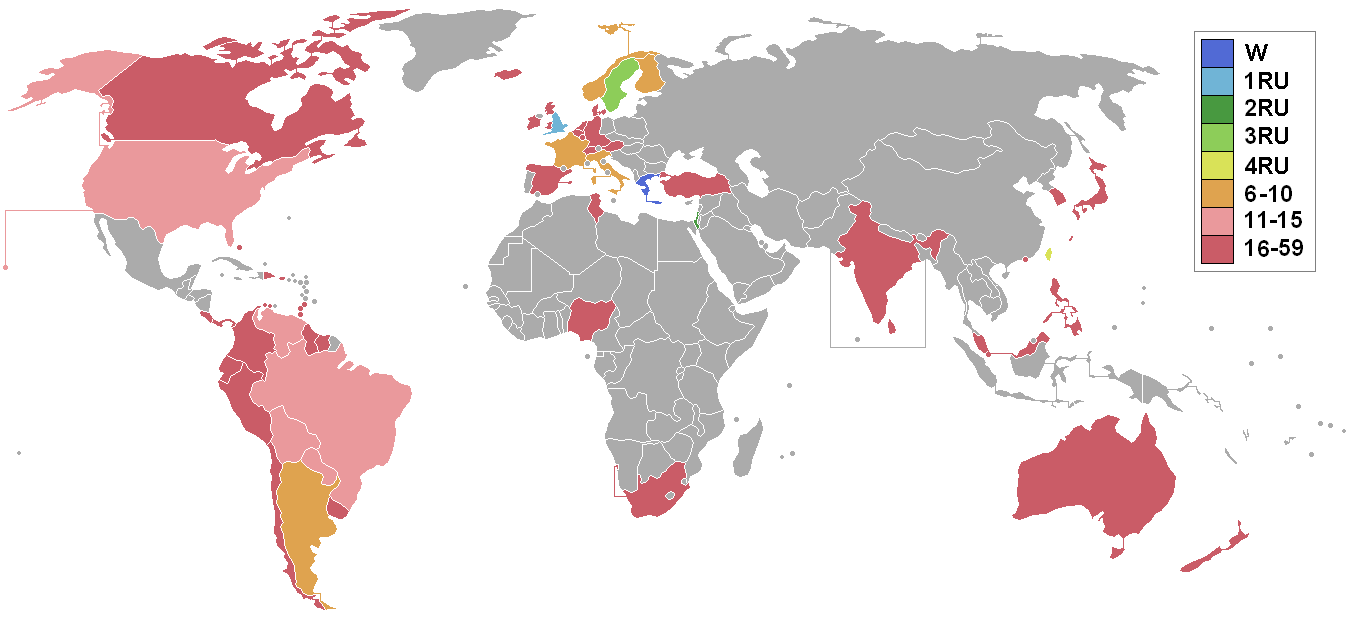
Miss Universe 1964 participating countries and territories

=== Placements ===
Placement	Contestant
Miss Universe 1964	Greece – Corinna Tsopei
1st Runner-Up	England – Brenda Blackler
2nd Runner-Up	Israel – Ronit Rinat
3rd Runner-Up	Sweden – Siv Åberg
4th Runner-Up	Republic of China – Lana Yu
Top 10	Argentina – María Ramírez; Finland – Sirpa Wallenius; France – Edith Noël; Italy – Emanuela Stramana; Norway – Jorunn Nystedt
Top 15	Bolivia – Mónica del Carpio; Brazil – Ângela Vasconcelos; Paraguay – Miriam Riart; United States – Bobbi Johnson; Venezuela – Mercedes Revenga

=== Special awards ===
Award	Contestant
Miss Amity	California – Jeanne Venables
Miss Photogenic	Italy – Emanuela Stramana
Best National Costume	Holland – Henny Deul

== Pageant ==
=== Format ===
Fifteen semi-finalists were chosen at the preliminary competition that consists of the swimsuit and evening gown competition. Each of the fifteen semi-finalists gave a short speech during the final telecast using their native languages. Afterwards, the fifteen semi-finalists paraded again in their swimsuits and evening gowns, and the ten finalists were eventually chosen. From the ten finalists, the runners-up and the new Miss Universe were then determined.

== Contestants ==
Sixty contestants competed for the title.

Country/Territory	Contestant	Age (Note: Ages at the time of the pageant)	Hometown
Argentina	María Ramírez	19	Santa Fe
Aruba	Lidia Henriquez	25	Oranjestad
Australia	Ria Lubyen	22	Melbourne
Austria	Gloria Mackh	22	Vienna
Bahamas	Catherine Cartwright	18	Nassau
Belgium	Danièle Defrère	20	Brussels
Bolivia	Mónica del Carpio	19	La Paz
Brazil	Ângela Vasconcelos	19	Paraná
British Guiana	Mary Holl	20	Georgetown
Canada	Mary Farrell	21	St. John's
Ceylon	Annette Kulatunga	19	Colombo
Chile	Patricia Herrera	18	Viña del Mar
Colombia	Alba Ramírez	18	Bogotá
Costa Rica	Dora Sola	21	San José
Curaçao	Iris de Windt	21	Willemstad
Denmark	Yvonne Mortensen	19	Copenhagen
Dominican Republic	Clara Chapuseaux	16	Comenador
Ecuador	Tanya Klein	18	Guayaquil
England	Brenda Blackler	20	Liverpool
Finland	Sirpa Wallenius	21	Helsinki
France	Edith Noël	20	Paris
Greece	Corinna Tsopei	20	Athens
Grenada	Christine Hughes	18	St. George's
Holland	Henny Deul	18	Amsterdam
Hong Kong	Mary Bai	23	Hong Kong
Iceland	Thelma Ingvarsdóttir	18	Reykjavík
India	Meher Castelino	18	Bombay
Ireland	Maurine Lecky	19	Dublin
Israel	Ronit Rinat	18	Haifa
Italy	Emanuela Stramana	22	Venice
Jamaica	Beverley Rerrie	23	Kingston
Japan	Chizuko Matsumoto	19	Fukuoka
Luxembourg	Mariette Stephano	18	Luxembourg City
Malaysia	Angela Filmer	19	Klang
New Zealand	Lyndal Cruickshank	21	Invercargill
Nigeria	Edna Park	19	Lagos
Norway	Jorunn Nystedt	18	Oslo
Okinawa	Toyoko Uehara	20	Okinawa
Panama	Maritza Montilla	19	Penonomé
Paraguay	Miriam Riart	21	Asunción
Peru	Miluska Vondrak	20	Loreto
Philippines	Myrna Panlilio	22	Manila
Puerto Rico	Yolanda Rodríguez	21	Rio Piedras
Republic of China	Lana Yu	20	Taipei
Saint Vincent	Stella Hadley	18	Kingstown
Scotland	Wendy Barrie	19	Glasgow
South Africa	Gail Robinson	20	Johannesburg
South Korea	Jung-hyun Shin	21	Seoul
Spain	María José Ulla	19	Madrid
Suriname	Cynthia Dijkstra	18	Paramaribo
Sweden	Siv Åberg	22	Stockholm
Switzerland	Sandra Sulzer	–	Lausanne
Trinidad and Tobago	Julia Laurence	18	Port of Spain
Tunisia	Claudine Younes	22	Tunis
Turkey	Inçi Duran	18	Istanbul
United States	Bobbi Johnson	19	Washington D.C.
Uruguay	Delia Babiak	–	Montevideo
Venezuela	Mercedes Revenga	18	Caracas
Wales	Marilyn Samuel	22	Monmouthshire
West Germany	Marina Kettler	20	Berlin
