= Isolation Stories =

British television mini-series

Isolation Stories is a British television mini-series about people living through the COVID-19 pandemic that was first broadcast on ITV on four consecutive nights from 4 May to 7 May 2020.

== Episodes ==
- Mel (broadcast 4 May 2020) starring Sheridan Smith - written by Gaby Chiappe
- Ron & Russell (broadcast 5 May 2020) starring Michael Jibson - written by Jeff Pope
- Mike & Rochelle (broadcast 6 May 2020) starring Angela Griffin - written by William Ivory
- Karen (broadcast 7 May 2020) starring David Threlfall - written by Neil McKay
