= The Abominable Dr. Phibes =

1971 film by Robert Fuest

- US film poster
- Directed by: Robert Fuest
- Written by: James Whiton; William Goldstein
- Produced by: Louis M. Heyward; Ronald S. Dunas
- Starring: Vincent Price; Joseph Cotten; Hugh Griffith; Terry-Thomas; Virginia North
- Cinematography: Norman Warwick
- Edited by: Tristam Cones
- Music by: Basil Kirchin
- Production company: AIP-England Ltd.
- Distributed by: MGM-EMI Distributors
- Release dates: 18 May 1971 (US); 26 August 1971 (UK)
- Running time: 94 minutes
- Country: United Kingdom
- Language: English
- Budget: £300,000
- Box office: $1.5 million, $1,827,000 or $3 million

The Abominable Dr. Phibes is a 1971 British comedy horror film directed by Robert Fuest, and written by James N. Whiton and William Goldstein. It stars Vincent Price in the title role, Dr. Anton Phibes, who blames his wife's death on the medical team that attended to her surgery four years earlier, and sets out to exact vengeance on each one. He is inspired in his murder spree by the Ten Plagues of Egypt from the Old Testament. The film co-stars Joseph Cotten, Hugh Griffith, Terry-Thomas, Virginia North, with an uncredited Caroline Munro appearing as Phibes's wife.

The film was produced by the UK branch of American International Pictures, and was released by MGM-EMI Distributors in April 1971. While it initially received mostly positive reviews from critics, it has since gone on to garner a significant cult following, with critics singling out Price's performance, the film's dark humour, and its Art Deco production design. A 2015 Time Out London poll ranked the film in the Top 100 Horror Films of All Time.

The film was followed by a direct sequel, Dr. Phibes Rises Again, released the following year.

== Plot ==
Dr. Anton Phibes, a famous concert organist with doctorates in both music and theology, is believed to have been killed in a car crash in Switzerland in 1921, while racing home upon hearing of the death of his beloved wife, Victoria, during surgery. Phibes survived the crash, but was horribly scarred and left unable to speak. He remade his face with prosthetics and used his knowledge of acoustics to regain his voice. Resurfacing secretly in London in 1925, Phibes believes his wife was a victim of her doctors' incompetence, and begins elaborate plans to kill those he believes are responsible for her death.

Aided in his quest for vengeance by his beautiful and silent assistant Vulnavia, Phibes uses the biblical Ten Plagues of Egypt as his inspiration, wearing an amulet with Hebrew letters corresponding with each plague as he conducts the murders. After three doctors have been killed, Inspector Trout, a detective from Scotland Yard, learns that they all had worked under the direction of Dr. Vesalius, who tells him the deceased had been on his team when treating Victoria, as were four other doctors and one nurse. Trout discovers one of Phibes's amulets (torn off during a struggle) at the murder scene of the fourth doctor, which takes place while he is interviewing Vesalius. He first takes it to the jeweller who made it, then to a rabbi to learn its meaning. Now believing Phibes may still be alive, Trout and Vesalius go to the Phibes mausoleum at Highgate Cemetery. Inside, they find a box of ashes in Phibes's coffin, but Trout deduces they are probably the remains of Phibes's chauffeur. Victoria's coffin is empty.

The police are unable to prevent Phibes from killing the remaining members of Vesalius's team, so they focus their efforts entirely on protecting Vesalius himself. Phibes kidnaps Vesalius's son Lem, then calls Vesalius and tells him to come alone to his mansion on Maldene Square if he wants to save his son's life. Trout refuses to let him go, so Vesalius knocks the inspector unconscious and races to Phibes's mansion, where he confronts him. Phibes tells him his son is under anaesthesia and prepared for surgery. Phibes has implanted a key near the boy's heart that will unlock his restraints. Vesalius has to surgically remove the key within six minutes (the same time Victoria was on the operating table) to release his son before acid from a container above Lem's head is released and kills him. Vesalius succeeds and moves the table out of the way. Vulnavia, who was ordered to destroy Phibes's mechanical creations, is surprised by Trout and his assistant; backing away, she is drenched with the acid and killed.

Convinced that he has accomplished his vendetta, Phibes retreats to the basement to inter himself in a stone sarcophagus containing the embalmed body of his wife. He proceeds to drain his blood while simultaneously replacing it with embalming fluid and lies down in the sarcophagus next to Victoria. The coffin's inlaid stone lid lowers into place, concealing it. Trout and the police arrive but cannot find Phibes. They recall that the "final curse" was darkness just before the basement goes dark.

== Cast ==
- Vincent Price as Dr. Anton Phibes
- Joseph Cotten as Dr. Vesalius
- Hugh Griffith as Rabbi
- Terry-Thomas as Dr. Longstreet
- Peter Jeffrey as Inspector Harry Trout
- Derek Godfrey as Crow
- Norman Jones as Sgt. Tom Schenley
- John Cater as Superintendent Waverley
- Aubrey Woods as Goldsmith
- John Laurie as Darrow
- Maurice Kaufmann as Dr. Whitcombe
- Barbara Keogh as Mrs. Frawley
- Sean Bury as Lem Vesalius
- Charles Farrell as Chauffeur
- Susan Travers as Nurse Allen
- David Hutcheson as Dr. Hedgepath
- Edward Burnham as Dr. Dunwoody
- Alex Scott as Dr. Hargreaves
- Peter Gilmore as Dr. Kitaj
- Virginia North as Vulnavia
- John Franklyn as Graveyard Attendant
- Walter Horsbrugh as Butler
- Caroline Munro as Victoria Regina Phibes (uncredited)

== Production ==
=== Writing ===
The film began as a script by writers James Whiton and William Goldstein. American International Pictures purchased the script, seeing it as a good vehicle for their biggest star, Vincent Price.

Director Robert Fuest rewrote most of the script, altering Dr Phibes (who in the original script abused his assistant Vulnavia) to be more sympathetic. He also opted to add in some deliberate humour, since critics often razed Price for over-the-top performances, and changed the death of Dr Kitaj by rats to take place on a plane instead of on a boat. Fuest found the boat death implausible, questioning why Kitaj could not save himself by simply jumping into the water.

The name of Phibes' wife, "Victoria Regina," was a nod to the stage play Victoria Regina, in which Vincent Price had made his Broadway debut back in 1937.

=== Casting ===
Peter Cushing was originally cast as Dr Vesalius, but bowed out due to the illness of his wife and was replaced by Joseph Cotten. He and Price would later co-star in Madhouse.

Caroline Munro was cast as Phibes's wife. She took the part despite it being limited to her lying still and silent, and despite objections from Hammer Films, who she was under contract at the time, because she wanted to work with Vincent Price. She could not be credited in the film due to the Hammer contract.

=== Filming ===
The film was shot on the "20s era" sets at Elstree Studios in Hertfordshire. The cemetery scenes were shot in Highgate Cemetery in London. The exterior of Dr Phibes's mansion was Caldecote Towers at Immanuel College on Elstree Road.

Price was reportedly in a good mood during the filming, cooking pâté and other specialty dishes for the cast and crew and telling them stories.

== Music ==
The music that Phibes plays on the organ at the beginning of the film is "War March of the Priests" from Felix Mendelssohn's incidental music to Racine's play Athalie.

The film's incidental score was composed by Basil Kirchin and includes 1920s-era source music, most notably "Charmaine" and "Darktown Strutters' Ball".

Dr. Phibes 1971 soundtrack LP

One of several music-related errors or anachronisms within the film's storyline is the song overlaid as a recorded performance by one of the ostensibly mechanized musicians of "Dr. Phibes' Clockwork Wizards." The pianist in this simulated animatronic band "sings" "One for My Baby (and One More for the Road)". Although the film's plot is set in England in the 1920s, this particular song did not exist until 1943, when Harold Arlen and Johnny Mercer wrote it as part of their film score for The Sky's the Limit. Fred Astaire sang the jazz standard for the first time in that musical comedy. Likewise, the melody of the song "You Stepped Out of a Dream", written by Nacio Herb Brown (music) and Gus Kahn (lyrics) and first published in 1940, accompanies a scene depicting Dr. Phibes and Vulnavia dancing together in the ballroom of his mansion. Other musical anachronisms are Vulnavia's playing "Close Your Eyes" (1933) on the violin, or her placing in a car a music box that plays "Elmer's Tune" (1941). At the end of the film, the song Over the Rainbow plays over the credits. It too was written around 17-18 years after the film's setting. This song would also feature at the end of the sequel, set three years later.

A soundtrack LP was released concurrently with the film's appearance, which contained few selections from the score, but rather was composed mostly of character vocalizations by Paul Frees. A proper soundtrack was released on CD in 2004 by Perseverance Records.

== Critical reception ==
On the review aggregator website Rotten Tomatoes, the film holds an approval rating of 88% based on 40 reviews, with an average rating of 7/10. The website's critics consensus reads, "The Abominable Dr. Phibes juggles horror and humor, but under the picture's campy façade, there's genuine pathos brought poignantly to life through Price's performance." The film, however, was not highly regarded by American International Pictures' home office until it became a box office success.

Contemporary critics were varied, but leaned towards the positive. Howard Thompson of The New York Times wrote, "The plot, buried under all the iron tinsel, isn't bad. But the tone of steamroller camp flattens the fun." Variety was generally positive, praising the "well-structured" screenplay, "outstanding" makeup for Vincent Price, and "excellent work" on the set designs. Gene Siskel of the Chicago Tribune gave the film three-and-a-half stars, calling it a "stylish, clever, shrieking winner", though he disliked "the lack of zip in the ending". In 2002, critic Christopher Null called the film "Vincent Price at his campy best ... A crazy script and an awesome score make this a true classic." Conversely, David Pirie of The Monthly Film Bulletin wrote: "This crassness in dialogue and direction is all the more irritating in that aspects of Dr. Phibes suggest that it might have been a reasonably intriguing film: much of the Thirties gadgetry and apparatus is attractively designed, and the pairing of Vincent Price with Joseph Cotten could in the right circumstances have amounted to a stroke of genius. Here, both are effectively emasculated by their roles, with Cotten given little to do and Price in a virtually non-speaking part (for the purposes of the plot he has to be seen to speak through an electronic socket in his neck). Phibes' ten elaborate curses give rise to a few macabre moments, but the last is rather more disturbing in its suggestion that a sequel is already imminent."

Its reputation has only contuined to grow in the modern day. In the early 2010s, Time Out London conducted a poll with several authors, directors, actors and critics who have worked within the horror genre to vote for their top horror films. The Abominable Dr. Phibes placed at number 83 on their top 100 list.

== Home video ==
MGM Home Entertainment released The Abominable Dr. Phibes on Region 1 DVD in 2001, followed by a tandem release with Dr. Phibes Rises Again in 2005. The film made its Blu-ray debut as part of Scream Factory's Vincent Price box set on 22 October 2013.

A limited edition two-disc set, The Complete Dr. Phibes, was released in Region B Blu-ray on 16 June 2014 by Arrow Films. Both films were later reissued separately by Arrow and as part of the nine-film/seven-disc Region B Blu-ray set The Vincent Price Collection on the Australian Shock label.

The TV broadcast version of the film excises some of the more grisly scenes, such as a close-up of the nurse's locust-eaten corpse.

== Sequel ==
A sequel, Dr. Phibes Rises Again, was released in 1972. It was also directed by Fuest and also stars Price as Phibes. Several other sequels were proposed, including The Bride of Dr. Phibes, but none was ever produced.
