= Lissa Evans =

British writer and television director/producer

Felicity Evans (born 1 May 1960), known as Lissa Evans, is a British television director, producer, novelist and children's author.

== Early life ==
Evans spent her early childhood in Englefield Green, Surrey before moving to Lichfield, Staffordshire at age 9. She attended Chadsmead Junior School. She studied medicine at Newcastle University, completing her qualification in 1983.

== Career ==
After graduating university, Evans worked as a junior doctor in Newcastle for four years before a brief period in stand-up, beginning with an ensemble review called "Wire Less Wireless" which played in some of the pubs in Newcastle. Evans joined BBC Radio where she was a producer of comedy programmes before migrating to television. She has produced and/or directed Father Ted (for which she won a BAFTA for best comedy), Room 101, The Kumars at No. 42, TV Heaven, Telly Hell, Crossing the Floor (for which she won an Emmy for best drama) and Have I Got News For You. She also served as voice director for the British-Canadian children's television series Don't Eat the Neighbours.

Evans has written seven novels for adults: Spencer's List, Odd One Out, Their Finest Hour and a Half (which was filmed as Their Finest), Crooked Heart (which with Their Finest Hour and a Half was long-listed for the Baileys Women's Prize for Fiction), Old Baggage, V for Victory and Small Bomb at Dimperley (published 2024).

For children, she has written Small Change For Stuart, shortlisted for the 2011 Costa Award for Children's fiction, the 2012 Carnegie Medal, and the 2012 Branford Boase Award, its sequel Big Change for Stuart, Wed Wabbit (shortlisted for the 2018 Carnegie Medal) and Wished (published in 2021). Small Change for Stuart was published in the United States, as Horten's Miraculous Mechanisms, and Big Change for Stuart (Horten's Incredible Illusions in the U.S.) was published in 2012.

== Bibliography ==
For adults:

- Spencer's List (2003)
- Odd One Out (2005)
- Their Finest Hour and a Half (2009)
- Crooked Heart (2014)
- Old Baggage (2018)
- V for Victory (2020)
- Small Bomb At Dimperley (2024)
- My Name is MacKenzie Bly (2026)

For children:

- Smudger the Dog Saves Christmas (2010)
- Small Change for Stuart (2011)
- Big Change for Stuart (2012)
- Wed Wabbit (2017)
- Wished (2021)
