= Miss Grenada World =

Beauty pageant

Miss Grenada World Organization
- Formation: 1964; 62 years ago
- Type: Beauty pageant
- Headquarters: St. George's
- Location: Grenada
- Members: Miss World
- Official language: English
- Leader: Jennifer Hosten
- Website: Official Website

Miss Grenada World was a beauty pageant which selected representatives for the Miss Universe and Miss World pageant from Grenada. The winner receives nationwide media exposure, thousands of dollars in prizes, an all-expense-paid trip to the Miss World contest and the opportunity to travel the world to act as an ambassador for various charitable causes.

== History ==
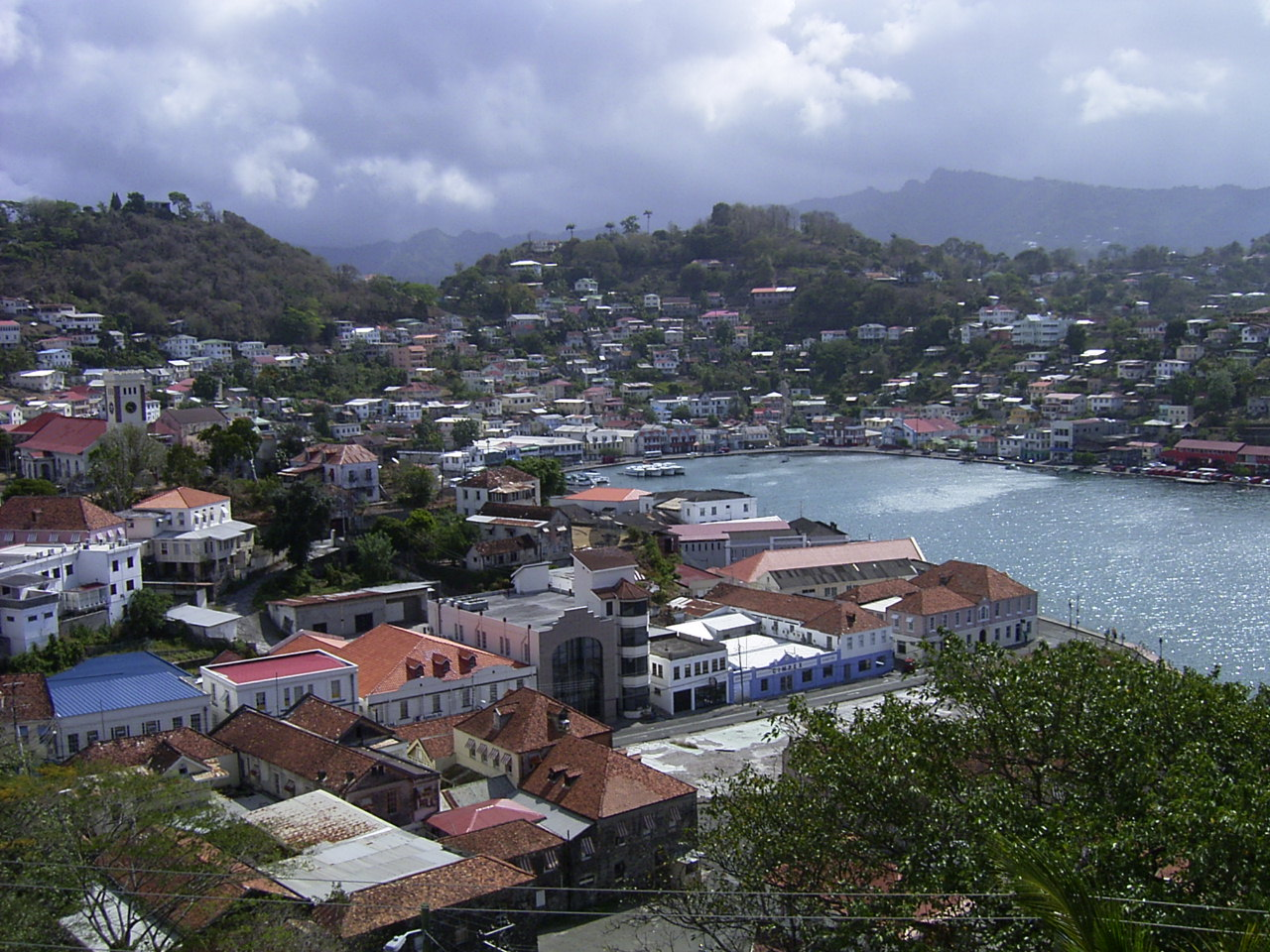
Bay St. George's, Grenada, the location of Jenny's Place, the headquarters in G.Ansedice, for Miss Grenada World.

Miss Grenada was held for first time in 1964. The competition is run as a franchise and organized by a committee. The event organizers strive to increase the skill level and confidence of young Grenadian women. Christine Hughes was the first Miss Grenada 1964 and competed at Miss Universe 1964.

== Miss World ==
Jennifer Hosten won the Miss World 1970 contest, representing Grenada. She became the first woman from her country to win the title. The whole contest had been controversial even before the result had been announced. Afterwards allegations were made about the influence of the Prime Minister of Grenada, who was on the judging panel.

=== Miss Grenada World ===
In 2007, Jennifer Hosten, Miss Grenada 1970, was granted the Miss Grenada World Franchise by the Miss World Organization. The event took place at Jenny's Place, a resort on the beach in Grand Anse and was sponsored by the Ministry of Tourism of Grenada and cosmetics company, Revlon.

== Titleholders ==
=== Miss Universe Grenada ===
- : Declared as Winner
- : Ended as runner-up or top 5/6 qualification
- : Ended as one of the finalists or semifinalists
- : Ended as special awards winner

Year	Miss Grenada	Placement
1964	Christine Hughes	Unplaced
Did not compete between 1965 - present

=== Miss World Grenada ===
- : Declared as Winner
- : Ended as runner-up or top 5/6 qualification
- : Ended as one of the finalists or semifinalists
- : Ended as special awards winner

Year	Miss Grenada	Placement
1970	Jennifer Hosten	Miss World 1970
Did not compete between 1971 - 1995
1996	Aria Johnson	Unplaced
Did not compete between 1997 - 2006
2007	Vivian Burkhardt	Top 16
2009	Tamara Lawrence	Did not compete
2013	Priscilla Collingsworth	Did not compete
