= Jennifer Hosten =

Canadian diplomat

Jennifer Josephine Hosten
- Hosten in 1970
- Born: 31 October 1947 (age 79); St. George's, Grenada
- Education: Carleton University
- Beauty pageant titleholder
- Title: Miss Grenada World 1970; Miss World 1970
- Hair color: Black
- Eye color: Brown
- Major competitions: Miss Grenada World 1970 (Winner); Miss World 1970 (Winner)
- Website: jenniferhosten.com

Jennifer Hosten (born 31 October 1947) is a Grenadian radio announcer, development worker, diplomat, author, model, and beauty pageant titleholder who was crowned Miss World 1970, representing Grenada. She was the first representative of her country and is celebrated as the first Black woman to win the title. It is now commonly accepted that the Carole Joan Crawford, Miss World 1963, was the first black Miss World. She was Jamaican, but most of the public did not know she was mixed race.

The 1970 contest had already been controversial before the winner was announced, and, following the result, allegations emerged regarding the influence of Eric Gairy, Grenada's prime minister, who served on the judging panel.

Hosten was born in St. George's, Grenada. She was 23 years old at the time of her Miss World victory in November 1970; accordingly, 31 October 1947 is generally regarded as her most likely date of birth among those reported. She pursued her studies in London and later worked for the BBC's Caribbean radio service before becoming a flight attendant.

== 1970 Miss World contest ==
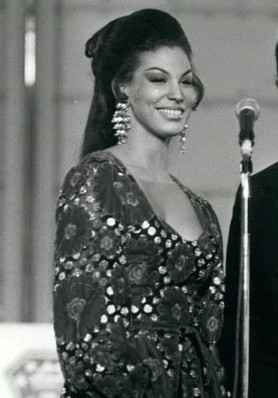

The 1970 contest was held in London, United Kingdom. It began with a row because the organisers had allowed two entries from South Africa, one black, one white. Then during the evening there were protests by women's liberation activists and flour was thrown. The comedian, Bob Hope, was also heckled.

Even greater controversy then followed after the result was announced. Jennifer Hosten won, becoming the first black woman to win Miss World, and the black contestant from South Africa was placed second. The BBC and newspapers received numerous protests about the result and accusations of racism were made by all sides. Four of the nine judges had given first-place votes to Miss Sweden, while Miss Grenada received only two firsts while receiving the most overall points. Miss Sweden, who was favoured to win, finished fourth. Furthermore, the Premier of Grenada, Eric Gairy, was on the judging panel. Although there were judges from several other countries which also took part in the contest, there were many accusations that the contest had been rigged. Some of the audience gathered in the street outside Royal Albert Hall after the contest and chanted "Swe-den, Swe-den". Four days later the organising director, Julia Morley, resigned because of the intense pressure from the newspapers. Years later Miss Sweden, Marjorie Christel Johansson, was reported as saying that she had been cheated out of the title.

Julia Morley's husband, Eric Morley, was the chairman of the company that owned the Miss World franchise. To disprove the accusations, Eric Morley put the judging panel's ballot cards on view and described the complex "majority vote system". These cards showed that Hosten had more place markings in the 2nd, 3rd, 4th and 5th positions over Miss Sweden and the other five finalists. Julia Morley then resumed her job.

== After the contest ==
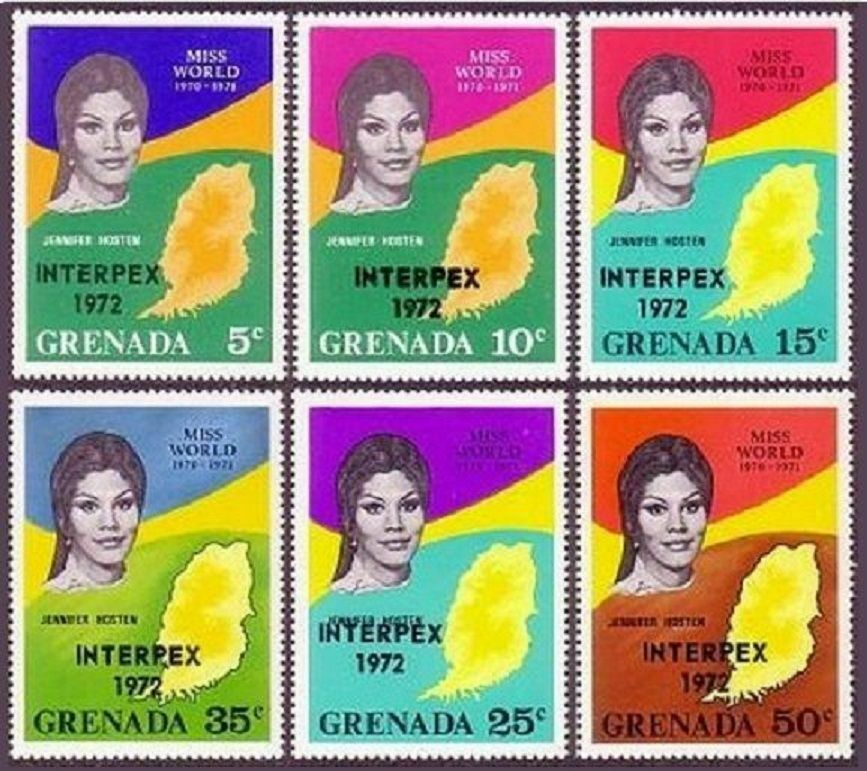
Jennifer Hosten (1971)

Hosten joined Bob Hope on his annual tour to U.S. forces overseas and made numerous other personal appearances all over the world with quiet dignity despite the controversy surrounding her victory. In 1971, a Grenada 15-cent postage stamp was issued to commemorate her victory.

Hosten then worked with Air Canada in customer relations, and married David Craig, an IT Manager with IBM. They lived in Bermuda until 1973, when they moved to Ontario, Canada. Coincidentally, Bermuda's Gina Swainson became the second black Miss World in Miss World 1979 (or third if including Carole Joan Crawford).

Hosten earned a Masters of Arts in Political Science and International Relations from Carleton University, Ottawa. She has two children, a daughter: Sophia Craig, and son: Beau Craig. Jennifer Hosten Craig was High Commissioner to Canada from Grenada from 1978 to 1981. In 1998 she served as Technical Adviser on Trade to the Organization of Eastern Caribbean States (OECS) while living on the island of Saint Lucia. More recently she worked as a Canadian diplomat (Aid Division) at the Canadian High Commission in Dhaka, Bangladesh before returning to the Caribbean.

In 1992 she published an academic study, The Effect of a North American Free Trade Agreement on the Commonwealth Caribbean.

Hosten opened Jenny's Place, beachfront studio apartments on Grand Anse Beach in Grenada, in August 2005.

In late 2006, Hosten was appointed the National Director of the Miss Grenada World Contest. The event took place on 31 March 2007, and chose only the third Grenadian woman in history to compete at the Miss World finals.

Her autobiography, Beyond Miss World, was published in 2008.

In 2011, Hosten graduated from Yorkville University, New Brunswick, Canada, with a master's degree in Counselling (Psychology). She currently works as a registered psychotherapist in Oakville, Ontario. She has five grandchildren.

== Legacy ==
Jennifer is portrayed by Gugu Mbatha-Raw in the 2020 British-French comedy-drama Misbehaviour about the 1970 Miss World competition.

== Bibliography ==
- Jennifer Hosten, The Effect of a North American Free Trade Agreement on the Commonwealth Caribbean, 1992, ISBN 978-0773495548
- Jennifer Hosten,Beyond Miss World, autobiography, 2008, ISBN 978-9768219046
- Jennifer Hosten, Miss World 1970: The Craziest Pageant in History and the Rest of My Life, Sutherland House Incorporated, 2020

Awards and achievements
Preceded by (Austria) Eva Rueber-Staier	Miss World; 1970	Succeeded by (Brazil) Lúcia Petterle
