= Virginia North =

Anglo-American actress (1946–2004)

Virginia North Lady White
- Born: Virginia Anne Northrop; 24 April 1946; London, England
- Died: 5 June 2004 (aged 58); East Sussex, England
- Occupations: Actress, model
- Years active: 1967–1971
- Spouse: Gordon White, Baron White of Hull (m. 1974; div. 1991)

Virginia Anne Northup (24 April 1946 – 5 June 2004), known professionally as Virginia North, was a British model and actress. She was best known for her role as Vulnavia, the titular character’s assistant, in the cult horror film The Abominable Dr. Phibes (1971). She was married to Gordon White, Baron White of Hull, from 1974 to 1991.

== Life and career ==
Born Virginia Anne Northrop in London to a British mother and a U.S. Army father, North spent her early years in Britain, France, Southeast Asia and finally Washington, D.C., following her father's military postings. By the mid-1960s she had returned to Britain, where she worked as a model, specialising in swim wear. In 1968, she joined the newly established London agency Models 1.

North began her film career with small parts in the Bulldog Drummond film Deadlier Than the Male (1967) and the Yul Brynner vehicle The Long Duel (1967). She returned to film two years later as Robot Number Nine in Some Girls Do (1969), the second in the Bulldog Drummond franchise, and as Olympe in two short scenes in the James Bond film On Her Majesty's Secret Service (1969).

The 1969 Department S episode "The Mysterious Man in the Flying Machine" marked her only television appearance.

Her last role was as Vincent Price's silent assistant, Vulnavia, in the horror comedy The Abominable Dr. Phibes (1971).

== Personal life ==
In 1974, North married the industrialist Gordon White.

== Filmography ==
Year	Title	Role	Notes
1967	Deadlier Than the Male	Brenda	
1967	The Long Duel	Champa	
1969	Some Girls Do	Robot No. 9	
1969	On Her Majesty's Secret Service	Olympe	
1971	The Abominable Dr. Phibes	Vulnavia	(final film role)
