= Miss World 1970 =

20th Miss World pageant

- Jennifer Hosten
- Date: 20 November 1970
- Presenters: Michael Aspel; Keith Fordyce
- Entertainment: Bob Hope; Lionel Blair
- Venue: Royal Albert Hall, London, United Kingdom
- Broadcaster: BBC
- Entrants: 58
- Placements: 15
- Debuts: Africa South (Note: Black representative from South Africa competed as Miss Africa South in the pageant); Grenada; Mauritius
- Withdrawals: Chile; Costa Rica; Czechoslovakia; Paraguay
- Returns: Ceylon; Hong Kong; Italy; Malaysia; Portugal; Puerto Rico; Spain; Switzerland; Thailand
- Winner: Jennifer Hosten; Grenada

Miss World 1970 was the 20th edition of the Miss World pageant, held at the Royal Albert Hall in London, United Kingdom on 20 November 1970.

At the end of the event, comedian Bob Hope crowned Jennifer Hosten of Grenada as Miss World 1970. It was Grenada's first-ever victory in the history of the pageant, and the first Black woman to win Miss World. Pearl Jansen of South Africa finished as first runner-up, while Irith Lavi of Israel finished as second runner-up.

Contestants from fifty-eight countries and territories participated in this pageant. Michael Aspel and Keith Fordyce hosted the pageant. Bob Hope and Lionel Blair performed at this edition.

== Background ==
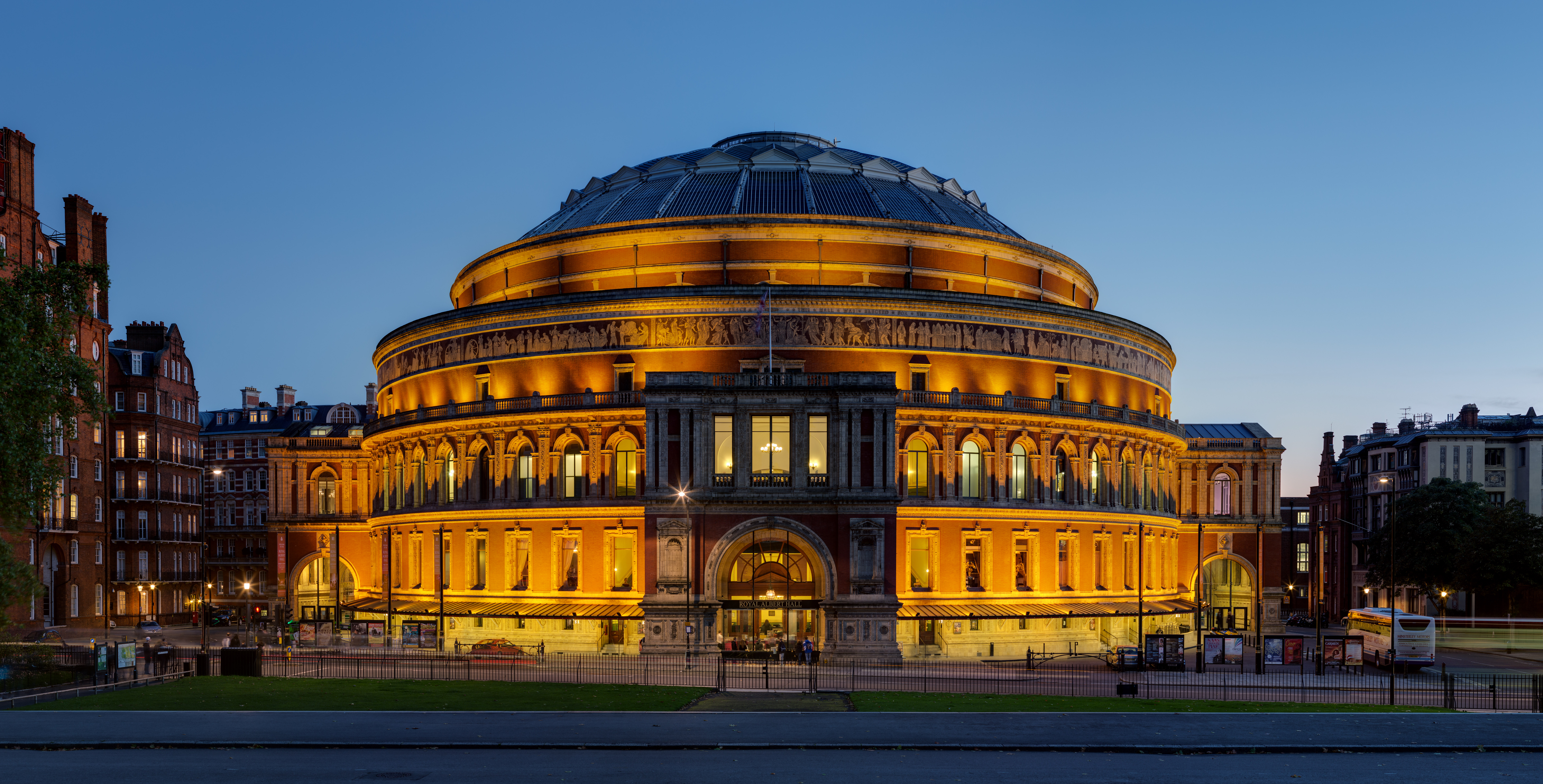
Royal Albert Hall, the location of Miss World 1970

=== Selection of participants ===
Participants from fifty-eight countries and territories were chosen to compete in the pageant. Three contestants were appointed to represent their countries/territories after placing as runners-up in their national pageants, or were selected through a casting process, and two contestants were appointed after the original delegates withdrew.

==== Replacements ====
Miss Italy 1970 Alda Balestra was originally scheduled to compete in this edition, but she did not participate in any international pageants because she was only sixteen years old. She was replaced by Marika de Poi, one of the finalists of Miss Italy 1970. Miss Lebanon 1970 Leila Ruad was originally scheduled to compete in this edition, but she was quickly replaced by Miss Lebanon 1971 Georgina Rizk as Lebanon's representative to Miss World due to undisclosed reasons. Rizk later competed in Miss Universe 1971 and won.

==== Debuts, returns, and withdrawals ====
The countries of Grenada and Mauritius competed for the first time. Returning to this edition were Hong Kong and Puerto Rico, which both last competed in 1959; Spain and Portugal, which both last competed in 1964; Malaysia, which last competed in 1966; and Ceylon, Italy, and Thailand, which all last competed in 1968.

Czechoslovakia, Costa Rica, Paraguay, and Chile did not compete in this edition. Miss Czechoslovakia 1970 first runner-up Xenie Hallová was originally scheduled to compete in this edition, but because the Government of Czechoslovakia prohibited any Czech from participating in any international beauty pageant, Hallová did not proceed with the competition. Julia Haydee Brenes of Costa Rica and Lilian Margarita Fleitas of Paraguay did not participate due to undisclosed reasons. Chile did not participate after its national organization failed to hold a national competition or appoint a delegate.

Miss Bermuda Margaret Hill was also scheduled to compete in this edition, but suddenly withdrew from the competition due to undisclosed reasons. Lovie Gaye of Singapore was also expected to arrive in London alongside Mary Ann Wong of Malaysia to participate in Miss World, but Gaye did not board the plane with Wong to London due to undisclosed reasons.

=== Controversies ===
==== Participation of two contestants from South Africa ====
Even before the competition began, controversy immediately arose after Miss World organizers accepted two participants from South Africa—one Black and one white—due to the apartheid being practiced in said country at the time. The Black contestant, Pearl Jansen, wore a sash reading "Africa, South", while the white contestant, Jillian Jessup, wore a sash reading "South Africa". Many objected to Eric Morley's decision because, according to them, the competition would not be fair if one country sent two contestants while others sent only one.

==== Protests and incidents during the competition ====
On the night of the competition, a bomb exploded under a BBC van parked outside the Royal Albert Hall in an attempt to disrupt the broadcast of Miss World. No injuries or casualties were reported from the explosion. On that same night, a protest by activists from the Women's Liberation Movement also took place outside the Royal Albert Hall. Because of this, audience members had to enter the Royal Albert Hall auditorium by bypassing noisy demonstrators blocking the rear of the barricades. Sixty activists entered inside the Royal Albert Hall, threw flour bombs onto the stage, and made noise with football rattles while American comedian Bob Hope was on stage. He was also heckled during the incident. After a few minutes, Hope returned to the stage and continued his dialogue with Eva Rueber-Staier. This event became the subject of the 2020 film Misbehaviour.

== Results ==
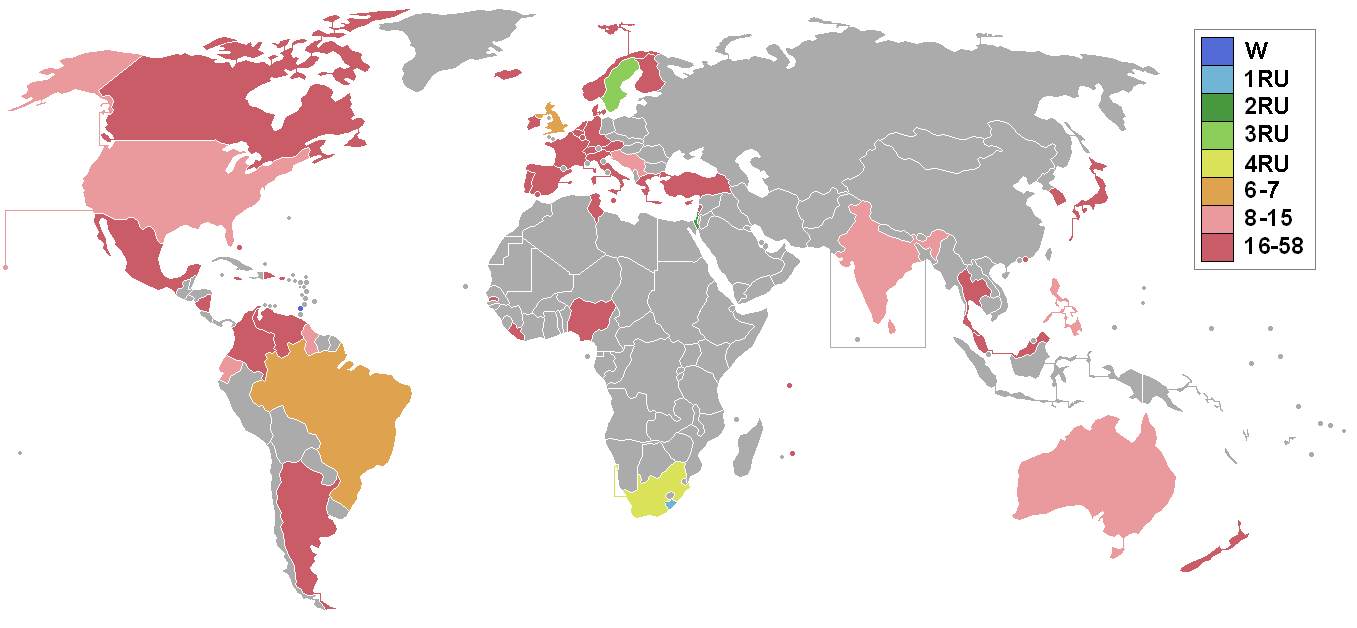
Countries and territories which participated in Miss World 1970 and their placements

=== Placements ===
Placement	Contestant
Miss World 1970	Grenada – Jennifer Hosten
1st runner-up	South Africa – Pearl Jansen
2nd runner-up	Israel – Irith Lavi
3rd runner-up	Sweden – Maj Christel Johansson
4th runner-up	South Africa – Jillian Jessup
Top 7	Brazil – Sônia Yara Guerra; United Kingdom – Yvonne Ormes
Top 15	Australia – Valli Kemp; (Sri Lanka) Ceylon – Yolanda Ahlip; Ecuador – Sofía Monteverde; Guyana – Jennifer Wong; India – Heather Corinne Faville; Philippines – Minerva Cagatao; United States – Sandra Wolsfeld; Yugoslavia – Tereza Đelmiš

== Pageant ==
=== Format ===
As in 1961, fifteen semi-finalists were chosen through a preliminary competition held on the day of the final competition, which consisted of the swimsuit and evening gown competitions. The fifteen semi-finalists competed in the swimsuit and evening gown competitions, and seven finalists were subsequently chosen to compete in the final interview.

=== Post-competition incidents ===
Another controversy arose during the announcement of the results when Jennifer Hosten of Grenada, a Black woman, was crowned as the new Miss World, and Pearl Jansen of South Africa, who was also Black, was named first runner-up. The BBC and newspapers in the United Kingdom received numerous protests regarding the results. Four out of the nine judges gave their first-place vote to Maj Christel Johansson of Sweden and only two to Hosten, but Johansson finished as third runner-up. Eric Gairy, the Premier of Grenada and one of the judges that night, was also accused of favoring Hosten and encouraging the judges to make her win. Due to the intense allegations against the organization, Miss World Organization organizing director Julia Morley decided to resign from her position.

To refute the accusations, Eric Morley displayed the judges' ballot cards showing the voting system implemented at Miss World. The cards showed that Hosten received more second, third, fourth, and fifth-place rankings than Johansson and the other finalists. Julia Morley later returned as organizing director of Miss World.

=== Selection committee ===
- Joseph Alseka – High Commissioner of Malawi to the United Kingdom
- Glen Campbell – American singer and guitarist
- Nat Cohen – English film producer
- Joan Collins – English actress, author, and columnist
- Peter Dimmock – BBC executive
- Fatehsinghrao Gaekwad – Maharaja of Baroda
- Eric Gairy – Premier of Grenada
- Roesmin Noerjadin – Indonesian Ambassador to the United Kingdom
- Nina, Baroness van Pallandt – Danish singer and actress

== Contestants ==
Fifty-eight contestants competed for the title.

Country/Territory	Contestant	Age (Note: Ages at the time of the pageant)	Hometown
Argentina	Patricia María Charré	22	Buenos Aires
Australia	Valli Kemp	19	Sydney
Austria	Rosemarie Resch	19	Vienna
Bahamas	June Brown	19	Nassau
Belgium	Francine Martin	20	Liège
Brazil	Sonia Yara Guerra	22	São Paulo
Canada	Norma Joyce Hickey	19	Prince Edward Island
(Sri Lanka) Ceylon	Yolanda Ahlip	22	Colombo
Colombia	Carmelina Bayona Vera	18	Santander
Cyprus	Louiza Anastadiades	19	Nicosia
Denmark	Winnie Hollmann	23	Copenhagen
Dominican Republic	Fátima Shecker	21	La Altagracia
Ecuador	Sofía Monteverde	20	Guayaquil
Finland	Hannele Hamara	18	Helsinki
France	Micheline Beaurain	21	Paris
(The Gambia) Gambia	Margaret Davies	20	Banjul
Germany	Dagmar Eva Ruthenberg	19	Berlin
Gibraltar	Carmen Gomez	21	Gibraltar
Greece	Julie Vardi	20	Athens
Grenada	Jennifer Hosten	22	St. George's
Guyana	Jennifer Wong	18	Georgetown
Hong Kong	Ann Lay	19	Hong Kong
Iceland	Anna Hansdóttir	17	Reykjavík
India	Heather Faville	24	Madras
(Republic of Ireland) Ireland	Mary McKinley	20	Donegal
Israel	Irith Lavi	18	Haifa
Italy	Marika de Poi	20	Rome
Jamaica	Elizabeth Ann Lindo	24	Kingston
Japan	Hisayo Nakamura	21	Fukuoka
Lebanon	Georgina Rizk	17	Beirut
Liberia	Mainusa Wiles	20	Monrovia
Luxembourg	Rita Massard	18	–
Malaysia	Mary Ann Wong	23	Ipoh
Malta	Marthese Galea	18	Sliema
Mauritius	Florence Muller	21	Port Louis
Mexico	Libia López	18	Sinaloa
Netherlands	Patricia Hollman	20	Doetinchem
New Zealand	Glenys Treweek	19	Auckland
Nicaragua	Evangelina Lacayo	23	Managua
Nigeria	Stella Owivri	20	Lagos
Norway	Aud Fosse	21	Oslo
Philippines	Minerva Cagatao	17	Isabela
Portugal	Ana Maria Lucas	21	Lisbon
Puerto Rico	Alma Pérez	21	San Juan
Seychelles	Nicole Barallon	17	Victoria
South Africa	Pearl Jansen	20	Cape Town
South Africa	Jillian Jessup	20	Port Elizabeth
South Korea	Lee Jung-hee	19	Seoul
Spain	Josefina Román	23	Chiclana de la Frontera
Sweden	Maj Christel Johansson	20	Stockholm
Switzerland	Sylvia Weisser	22	Zollikon
Thailand	Tuanjai Amnakamart	17	Bangkok
Tunisia	Kaltoum Khouildi	24	Tunis
Turkey	Afet Tuğbay	18	Istanbul
United Kingdom	Yvonne Ormes	21	Nantwich
United States	Sandra Wolsfeld	24	Wheaton
Venezuela	Tomasa Nina de las Casas	22	Miranda
Yugoslavia	Tereza Đelmiš	19	Subotica

== In popular culture ==
In 2014, the BBC Radio produced a documentary as an episode of their The Reunion series, bringing together Hosten, Michael Aspel, and some of the protestors who disrupted the competition. This documentary inspired Philippa Lowthorpe to produce and direct the 2020 film Misbehaviour, which dramatized the events of the 1970 pageant. BBC Television later also produced a documentary titled Beauty Queens and Bedlam, in which they interviewed pageant protestors, organizers, Aspel, as well as Hosten, Jansen, and Johansson.
