= Abigail Thaw =

English actress (born 1965)

Abigail J. Thaw
- Born: 1 October 1965 (age 61); London, England
- Occupation: Actress
- Spouse: Nigel Whitmey (m. 1986)
- Children: 2
- Parent(s): Sally Alexander (mother); John Thaw (father); Sheila Hancock (stepmother)

Abigail J. Thaw (born 1 October 1965) is an English actress known for her role of investigative journalist Dorothea Frazil in detective drama series Endeavour. Thaw has appeared in numerous TV series, such as Casualty, Midsomer Murders, Agatha Christie's Poirot and Black Mirror, as well as many stage productions.

== Early life ==
Abigail Thaw was born in London to actor John Thaw and his first wife, Sally Alexander, an academic/feminist activist who taught modern history at Goldsmiths College. Her parents divorced in 1968. On her mother's side she has a half-brother (Daniel), and on her father's side she has an elder stepsister (Melanie Jane) and a half-sister (Joanna). Her stepmother is actress Sheila Hancock.

After her parents' divorce in 1968, Abigail was brought up in Pimlico by her mother and her mother's new partner, Gareth Stedman Jones. Her father also kept in regular contact. Abigail attended Pimlico Comprehensive. Her mother was involved in the flour-bombing of the 1970 Miss World contest, the story of which is the subject of the 2020 film Misbehaviour.

After school she spent a year in Italy, where she was in a car accident. Returning to England, she decided to attend RADA, where she met her future husband, actor Nigel Whitmey.

== Career ==
Abigail Thaw began her career working in rep at Cheltenham, York, and Salisbury, then performed with the RSC and the Royal Exchange Theatre and Library in Manchester, Chichester, The Tricycle, The Gate, Theatre503, The Orange Tree, Battersea Arts Centre, New End, The Finborough, Birmingham, Theatr Clwyd, Watford and extensive touring in Whipping It Up, Ladies in Lavender and Entertaining Angels. She played Ms Capulet in Tom Morris' Juliet and her Romeo at the Bristol Old Vic, and acted in Cymbeline with Mark Rylance at The Globe Theatre and Brooklyn Academy of Music. She also spent a year working with Mike Alfred's company, "Method and Madness", performing in Private Lives, Jude the Obscure and Flesh and Blood. She was nominated for the 2011 Offie for Best Actress (The Firewatchers) at the Old Red Lion. In early 2015, she participated in the world premiere of Michael Hastings' The Cutting of the Cloth.

Thaw has also worked in television since 1990, including in The Bill, Casualty, Pie in the Sky, Peak Practice, Spywatch, Vanity Fair, Love Soup and Trust. In 2009 she appeared in the Midsomer Murders episode “Small Mercies” as Annabel Johnson; and the Agatha Christie's Poirot episode “The Clocks”. She also performed in the 2016 BBC comedy series I Want My Wife Back.

She played a newspaper editor in the ITV1 2011 Christmas special edition of the Inspector Morse prequel, Endeavour, a role she continued in Series 1, and in subsequent series.

In 2014, Thaw appeared as a shaman in The Inbetweeners 2.

== Personal life ==
Thaw met Nigel Whitmey at RADA in the mid-1980s, and they married in 1986. In 1997 she gave birth to a daughter, Molly-Mae Whitmey, and in 2003 to her second daughter, Talia. The family live in Muswell Hill, north London.Her daughter Molly had a cameo as the younger version of her grandmother Sally Alexander in the Endeavour episode "Oracle" (series 7, episode 1, broadcast February 1, 2020).

== Filmography ==
=== Film ===
Year	Title	Role	Notes
2000	Trust	Caroline	TV film
2005	The Stepfather	DS Sullivan	TV film
2009	Tales of the Fourth Dimension	Ann Hathaway	Direct-to-Video
2014	The Inbetweeners 2	Shaman	
2015	Caring for the Recently Deceased	Dr. James	Short film
2015	Nipplejesus	Juliette	Short film
2017	The Penny Dropped	The Being	Short film

=== Television ===
Year	Title	Role	Notes
1990	The Bill	Berne	Episode: "Sufficient Evidence"
1995	Pie in the Sky	DS Lorna Purvis	Episode: "Brown Bread"
1996	Spywatch	Vivienne Belling	Recurring role, 6 episodes
1997	Casualty	Aileen O'Donnell	Episode: "Tall Tales"
1998	Vanity Fair	Jane Osborne	Mini-series, 3 episodes
1999	The Bill	Officer Dunsmore	Episode: "Follow Through"
1999	Big Bad World	Alice	Episode: "Be Nice to Posh People"
2000	Peak Practice	Pam Lloyd	Episode: "For Love of the Child"
2003	Doctors	Lois Campbell	Episode: "Points of View"
2006	Casualty	Karen Whitear	Episode: "Heads Together"
2008	Love Soup	Phillipa	Episode: "Dream Twister"
2009	Midsomer Murders	Annabel Johnson	Episode: "Small Mercies"
2009	Agatha Christie's Poirot	Rachel Waterhouse	Episode: "The Clocks"
2011	Doctors	Dr. Andrea Weller	Episode: "Lord Letherbridge"
2012–2023	Endeavour	Dorothea Frazil	Series regular, 25 episodes
2013	Black Mirror	Juliet	Episode: "The Waldo Moment"
2016	I Want My Wife Back	Abbie	Series regular, 6 episodes
2017	Doctors	Elizabeth Briscoe	Episode: "Field Fever"
2018	Casualty	Emma Mabbitt	Episode: "Episode #32.36"
2020	Housebound	Annabel Monroe	Recurring role, 3 episodes
2021	The Nevers	Mrs. Hundley	Episode: "True"
2022	Miss Scarlet and the Duke	Mrs. Herbert	Episode: "Arabella"
2023	Sister Boniface Mysteries	Dinah Morgan	Episode: "Don't Try This at Home"
2026	Patience	Cathy Wilkes	Episode: "The Runes"
2026	House of the Dragon	Lady Gaskell	Episode: "Rhaenyra Triumphant"

== Theatre credits ==
Year	Title	Role	Venue	Notes
2000	Cymbeline	Arvirargus	Shakespeare's Globe, London	
2000	Making It Up	Ruth	Manchester Library Theatre, Manchester	
2000	Rough Crossing	Natasha	Salisbury Playhouse, Salisbury and Watford Palace Theatre, Watford	
2001	Macbeth	Lady Macbeth	Salisbury Playhouse, Salisbury	
2003	The Road to the Sea	Harriet	Orange Tree Theatre, London	
2004	The Arab-Israeli Cookbook	Hala	Gate Theatre, London	
2005	The Arab-Israeli Cookbook	Hala	Tricycle Theatre, London	
2006	Entertaining Angels	Jo	Chichester Festival Theatre, Chichester	
2007	Whipping It Up	Delia	Ambassadors Theatre, London and UK Tour	
2008	Absent Friends	Diana	Watford Palace Theatre, Watford	
2009	My Mother Said I Never Should	Margaret Bradley	Watford Palace Theatre, Watford	
2010	Juliet and her Romeo	Miss Capulet	Old Vic, Bristol	
2011	The Firewatchers	Catherine	The Old Red Lion, London	
2011	Sold	Hilary	Theatre503, London	
2012	Ladies in Lavender	Olga Danilof	Royal & Derngate, Northampton and UK Tour	
2015	The Cutting of the Cloth	Iris	Southwark Playhouse, London	
2017	Julius Caesar	Trebonius	Crucible Theatre, Sheffield	
2018	The Strange Death of John Doe	Carter	Hampstead Theatre, London	
2022	Sheila's Island	Denise	Yvonne Arnaud Theatre, Guildford and UK Tour	
