= Friend or Foe =

Friend or Foe may refer to:

== Film and television ==
- Friend or Foe (film), a 1982 British film by John Krish
- Friend or Foe (game show), a 2002–2003 American game show that aired on Game Show Network
- Friend or Foe (SpongeBob SquarePants), 2007 SpongeBob SquarePants episode
- "Friend or Foe" (Squid Game), 2024 Squid Game episode

== Music ==
- Friend or Foe (album), album by Adam Ant
- "Friend or Foe" (Adam Ant song), 1982
- Friend or Foe? (The Forces of Evil album)
- Friend or Foe? (Blackmail album), 2003
- "Friend or Foe" (t.A.T.u song)
- "Friend or Foe", a song by Jay-Z from his album Reasonable Doubt

== Other uses ==
- Friend or Foe (novel), a 1977 British children's book by Michael Morpurgo
- Identification friend or foe, cryptographic identification system
- Spider-Man: Friend or Foe, computer and video game

== See also ==
- Friend and Foe, an album by Menomena
