= Friend or Foe (novel) =

1977 British children's novel

- Author: Michael Morpurgo
- Language: English
- Genre: Children's literature
- Set in: World War II
- Publisher: Macmillan Education
- Publication date: 1977
- Publication place: Great Britain
- Pages: 121
- ISBN: 978-1-4052-3337-8
- OCLC: 60866398

Friend or Foe is a British children's novel written by Michael Morpurgo. It was originally published in Great Britain by Macmillan Education in 1977, and was the third book he authored. The novel is set during World War II, and Morpurgo was inspired to write the book after listening to stories from his aunt and her involvement in the evacuation of children from her school during World War II. In 1982, the novel was adapted into a British independent film by the same name, and in 2011, it was adapted by Daniel Buckroyd for a stage play.

== Plot ==
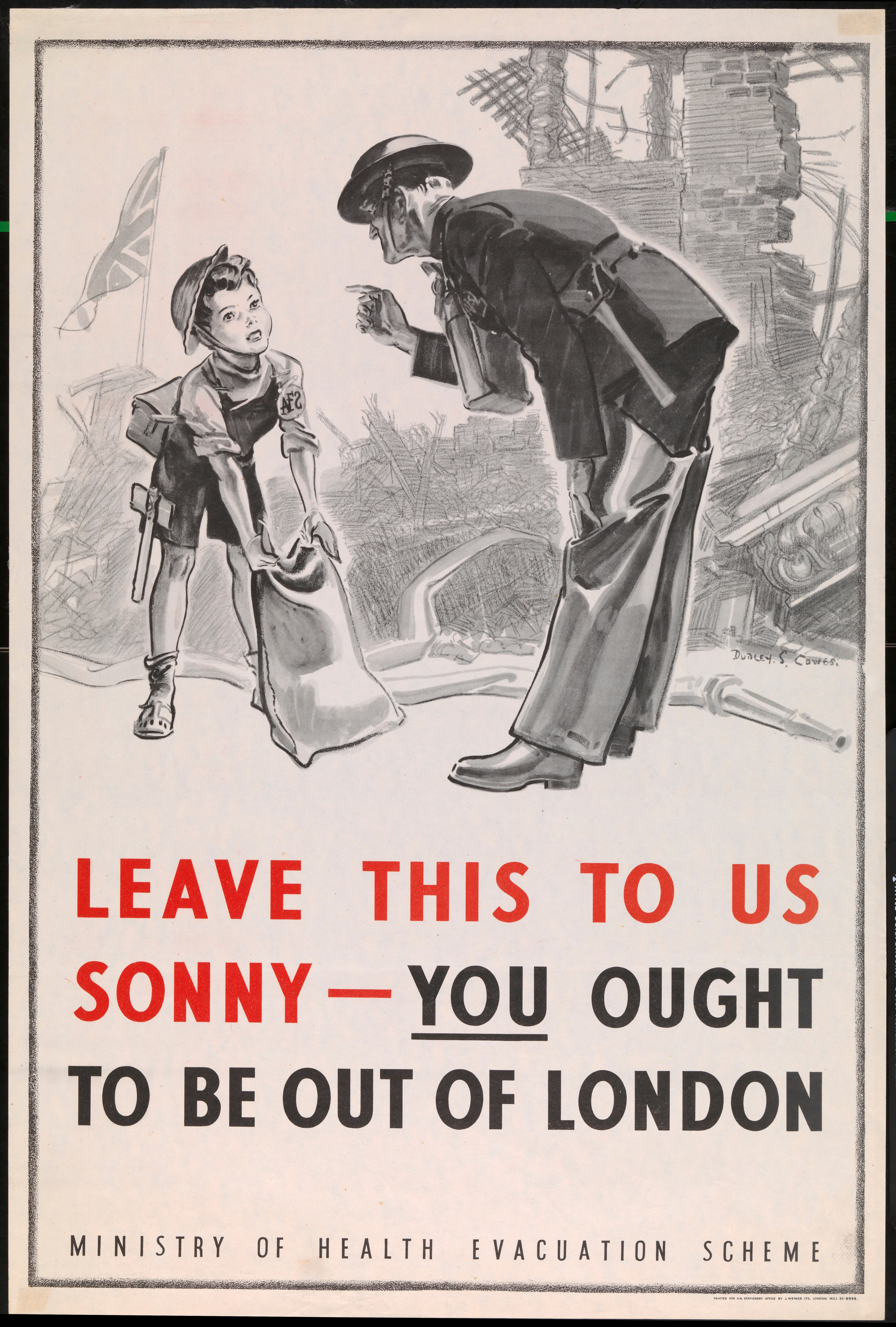
A poster for the evacuation programme in the underground

The year is 1940, and best mates David and Tucky, along with their school chums are being evacuated from London to Devon to escape the Blitz. After a tearful good-bye to their mothers, and carrying nothing but their suitcases and some silly looking gas masks, they are quickly shepherded aboard the underground and travel from Islington to Paddington Station, where they are given name tags to wear. After a long delay, the boys and their mates from school board a train that takes them to Exeter, where they climb aboard a coach that takes them to their final destination; a small village where they will be staying until it is safe to return to London.

Upon arrival at the village, they are taken to the local hall and fed, and then the residents of the village start to arrive, looking over the children and then choosing one child to take home with them. After a bit, David and Tucky are the only ones left, and start to worry they will have no place to go. Just then, a farmer and his wife arrive and the man announces he will not split them up and takes the both of them. They settle into their new lives on the farm, helping out with the chores, accompanied by their new friend, Jip the sheepdog.

One night when they are left alone at the farm, the boys witness a German plane crash out on the moor near the farm. They report what they have observed to the local authorities, who conduct a search and find nothing to substantiate their claim. The boys are laughed at and thought to be liars, concocting the story to get out of going to school. So David and Tucky set out on their own search to prove themselves right. After a day of searching, finding nothing, the pair starts to return home, when David slips and falls into a river and is pulled under by the current. Out of nowhere seemingly, a hand suddenly appears and scoops him out of the water. His rescuer turns out to be one of the German pilots who has been hiding out in the moorlands since the crash of their plane. Nearby is his companion, who was injured in the crash and is very weak.

After a brief introduction, the soldiers ask the boys to bring them food and blankets, but David is wary of helping the enemy, so Tucky reminds him that one of them saved his life, so the boys obliged them. The boys continue to visit the pilots, and once again, the men ask for food, and tell the boys this is the last time as they will attempt to escape by heading off to the sea. After arriving with their second delivery of food, the soldiers make a surprising ask. The injured soldier is in no condition to travel, so they request he be taken back to the farm as the boy's prisoner, and the other one will escape as planned. The boys agree and take him back, and he is turned over to the authorities, and the boys are celebrated as heroes. The boys eventually return to London to their families, and later as adults, they still return to the farm to visit the couple who took them in.

== Background ==
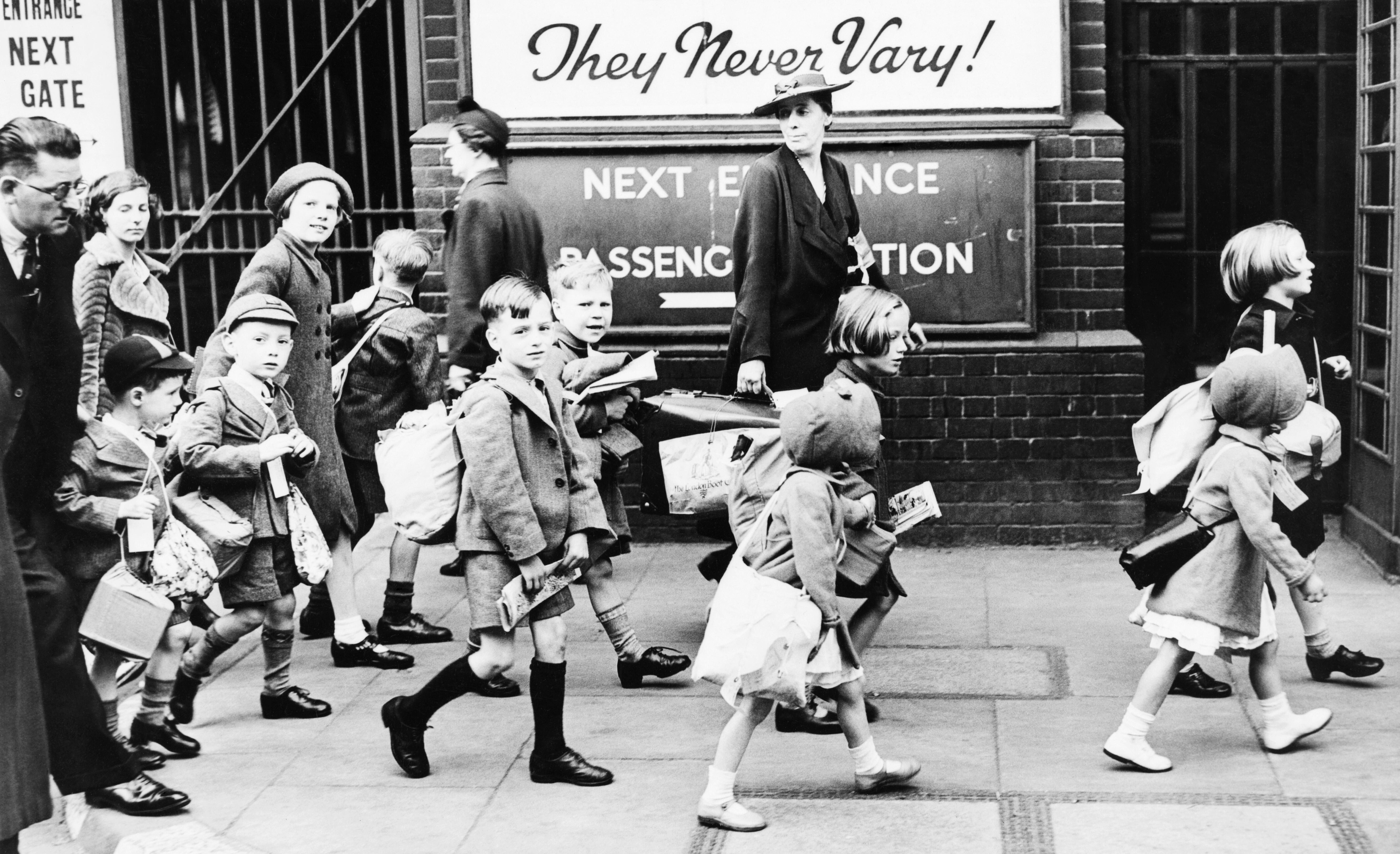
Schoolchildren seen in 1940 about to catch a train to evacuate them from London

Morpurgo said he was inspired to write the story by his aunt, who as a teacher at the time of World War II, was herself responsible for the evacuation of the children in her school. Morpurgo recalls how his aunt told him of the "auction – almost – of the children on the stage of the village hall and of there not being enough farmers and villagers to look after all the children and how upset she was". In 2009, Morpurgo said he was "tempted to rewrite the story", because at the time, this only being the third book he had written, said he "wrote it too early; I didn't know how to tell stories. The importance of atmosphere – being able to smell the sky and feel the mud."

== Themes and analysis ==
In their analysis of the book, the authors of Children at War state that like "many of Morpurgo's books, the story tackles themes of displacement, prejudice and the unfairness often suffered by children". They highlight an example of prejudice when the boys see the plane crash, and after the failure of the authorities to find the plane, David and Tucky experience "the misery of being marked out as different; where the two boys had been integrated into the village community they are now almost ostracized, taunted by their school mates as townies".

The authors also point out the unfairness of the ethical dilemma and moral conflict the boys face after the German soldier who saved David's life, is now asking the boys for help. On the one hand, there is the question of loyalty and duty to their country; immediately sounding the alarm and turning the soldiers in, and on the other hand, the boys also feel a sense a personal responsibility to help them, since one of them saved David's life. The authors sum up their analysis by noting how at the end of the book, when the boys confess to having helped the soldiers, by providing them with food and blankets; the farmer says to Tucky: "tis never wrong to do what you feel is right". They opine that "his simple sentiment provides the implicit moral behind the whole book, a story in which individual conscience must take precedence over national pride and official duty".

== Release ==
The book was originally published in Great Britain by Macmillan Education in 1977. In 2004, a dramatisation of the novel was broadcast by BBC Radio 7, in a special show that was aired live from the Juno Beach Centre in Normandy. It was also adapted for BBC School Radio, in an eight episode format, that featured an educational resource pack for teachers to use in the classroom.

== Reviews ==
Fiona Collins wrote in The Historian that Morpurgo "attempts to broaden the reader's view of the Second World War by writing a story which focuses on German pilots being shot down and found by English children and the dilemma the children find themselves in as a result of this". She also pointed out that "like many of Morpurgo's stories, life is more complex and the boys need to make a choice between doing the right thing and doing what is expected".

British write Julia Eccleshare wrote Morpurgo is "at his best with adventures on a small, personal scale featuring the triumph or growth of an individual; it's the theme with which he began; in this book he shows his ability to identify with the obviously 'different' children; how they see themselves and how they overcome the problems set in their way".

In his review of the novel, Lee Talley of Children's Literature wrote that Morpurgo's book "extends the realism of evacuation by exploring the intersection of emotion and masculinity; and his text explores the uncanniness of separation as well as the strong ties of affection". He also pointed out the emotional connection that David kept with his mother in the form of letter writing between the two; "he looked forward to his mother's letters and kept every one under his pillow, and read and reread them whenever he could".

== Film adaptation ==
For me as a writer, the consequence was that publishers took me slightly more seriously. I was now B+ in their eyes, no longer B−.

— Michael Morpurgo

In 1982, the novel was adapted into a British independent film by the same name, that was written and directed by John Krish. It was produced by Gordon Scott for the Children's Film Foundation, and was theatrically released in April 1982. It stars John Bardon, Stacey Tendeter, Valerie Lush, Edward Burnham, Prentis Hancock and Stephen Bent. Morpurgo said that the Children's Film Foundation initially approached him about writing the screen play for the film adaptation. He said that since he really knew nothing about writing a screenplay, he turned down the offer. He recalled that when the film was released, he "was of course thrilled to be sitting there in a cinema watching my story unfolding in front of me; it was a modest film, well acted, and it did well enough".

== Stage adaptation ==
In 2011, the novel was adapted by Daniel Buckroyd into a stage play, who also directed the production. The play featured Mathew Hamper as Tucky, and Paul Sandys as David. In her five-star review for WhatsOnStage, Anne Priestman wrote that the "young audience at the première performance in Watford was immediately gripped by the story", and that "both Hamper and Sandys are excellent as the boys". In 2014, a new adaptation was staged at the Mercury Theatre in Colchester. It featured Séan Aydon as Tucky and Jake Davies as David. Sam Marlowe wrote in The Times that Aydon and Davies "are an enormously appealing duo and it's the details in their interaction that bring the staging to life". He concluded that "it's a gentle drama, and the producers could usefully have allowed more darkness and danger to creep in; but it's affecting nonetheless, with a sweet-natured charm that in the end proves winning".
