= Entertaining Angels =

Entertaining Angels may refer to:

- Entertaining Angels (play), a 2009 play by Richard Everett
- Entertaining Angels: The Dorothy Day Story, a 1996 film about the life of Dorothy Day
- "Entertaining Angels" (song), a single and EP by Newsboys
- Entertaining Angels, by Landmarq, or the title song, 2012
