= Bust (TV series) =

- Genre: Comedy drama
- Created by: Philip Hinchcliffe; Simon Passmore
- Starring: Paul Nicholas; Phyllis Logan; Belinda Lang; Ron Emslie; Geraldine Alexander; Sarah Neville; John Vine; Shirin Taylor
- Composers: Rod Argent; Peter Van Hooke
- Country of origin: United Kingdom
- Original language: English
- No. of seasons: 2
- No. of episodes: 12

Production
- Executive producer: Nick Elliott
- Producer: Philip Hinchcliffe
- Running time: 60 minutes (including commercials)
- Production company: LWT

Original release
- Network: ITV
- Release: 4 September 1987 – 12 November 1988

Bust is a British comedy-drama television series created by Philip Hinchcliffe and Simon Passmore, starring Paul Nicholas as bankrupted businessman Neil Walsh. The cast includes Phyllis Logan, Belinda Lang, Ron Emslie, Geraldine Alexander and Sarah Neville. Two series were produced by LWT and broadcast on ITV between 4 September 1987 and 12 November 1988.

== Plot summary ==
The series focuses on Neil Walsh, a businessman who is declared bankrupt and tries to organise or get involved in investment schemes to overcome his financial problems and rebuild his life. Concurrently, his marriage to his wife Sheila is already on the rocks when she walks out on him; Neil tries to rebuild their relationship, but his business dealings and financial problems frequently get in the way. Following his bankruptcy hearing, Walsh is appointed a succession of trustees to handle his finances and monitor his affairs, Janet Summers (Series 1) and Carol Chapman (Series 2). He frequently ropes in his lawyer Adam Freeman to assist him with his various schemes, in order to recover his financial position.

== Background ==
The series was conceived by Philip Hinchcliffe and Simon Passmore, who collaborated on a number of episodes; they were assisted by Michael Aitkens, who wrote eight episodes for the series. Hinchcliffe had recently moved to LWT, after unsuccessfully trying to get the series produced at the BBC. The series was developed as part of LWT's drive to make their programmes more appealing to a wide audience and beat the BBC in the ratings. This was part of a network-wide effort by ITV at the time to boost the quality and appeal of their output, investing £80 million into their autumn schedule, commissioning new programmes like The New Statesman, The Bretts, The Dame Edna Experience and The Charmer, the latter also produced by Hinchcliffe.

A tie-in novel written by Roger Morton was released on 3 September 1987. The series had incidental music composed by Peter Van Hooke and Rod Argent, who also wrote the theme tune "You Ain't Gonna Cry No More", which was sung by Nicholas.

== Cast ==
- Paul Nicholas as Neil Walsh
- Phyllis Logan as Sheila Walsh (Series 1)
- Belinda Lang as Sheila Walsh (Series 2)
- Ron Emslie as Adam Freeman
- Geraldine Alexander as Janet Summers
- Sarah Neville as Carol Chapman
- John Vine as Richard Graham
- Shirin Taylor as Sally McLaren

== Episodes ==
=== Series overview ===
Series	Episodes	Originally released	
Series	Episodes	First released	Last released
1	6	4 September 1987	9 October 1987
2	6	8 October 1988	12 November 1988

=== Series 1 (1987) ===
No. overall	No. in series	Title	Original release date
1	1	"Write Off"	4 September 1987
A construction deal falls through, when the cement supplied turns out to be impure. As the creditors close in on Paul, his wife Sheila walks out on him and begins divorce proceedings.
2	2	"Hidden Assets"	11 September 1987
After being declared bankrupt, the court appoints a trustee, Janet Summers (Geraldine Alexander), to handle Paul's affairs. Having lost everything, Paul tries to rebuild his life before Hassoud's (Ravi Rawi) henchmen can take him apart over a £50,000 debt.
3	3	"Stag at Bay"	18 September 1987
Paul is asked to front a business deal and temporarily take charge of the funds. He finds that an enticing new share flotation is not the kind opportunity he would like to miss, despite not having any money of his own to invest.
4	4	"Selling a Dummy"	25 September 1987
Paul tries to trade secretly by setting up a company called Devenish Enterprises, which he sets up in Sheila's name. She increasingly gets dissatisfied with the setup as her teaching job is imperriled and seeks to make a business career of her own.
5	5	"Man of Property"	2 October 1987
Neil visits his mother Brenda (Liz Smith) and hears about a local farm that is on the market. Later, he buys the farm and uses his mother's cottage as collateral as tries to sell it for a profit to a property developer Alan Hardy (Gavin Richards).
6	6	"Family Business"	9 October 1987
Whilst waiting for his application for discharge from bankruptcy to be heard, his brother-in-law Willie (Ron Donachie) asks him to guard £50,000 of his company slush fund. Meanwhile, Sheila starts her own business, running a health boutique.

=== Series 2 (1988) ===
No. overall	No. in series	Title	Original release date
7	1	"Cleaning Up"	8 October 1988
Whilst still owing £90,000, Neil attempts to mop up his debts by setting up a cleaning firm in his wife's name. Just as he attempts to try a reconcilliation with Sheila, he has been appointed a new trustee Carol Chapman (Sarah Neville) to handle his money problems.
8	2	"Love and Profit"	15 October 1988
Neil and Carol try to ignore the chemistry between them during their initial meeting. But when Neil discovers that Carol's private life is in mess, he decides to get involved.
9	3	"Weekend Break"	22 October 1988
Neil takes Sheila on a weekend break to the seaside, where they encounter Juliet, one of his old flames. Upon hearing that's he's in town, Neil's friend Barry Donovan (Trevor Byfield) offers him a business opportunity to sell berths to prospective buyers at a new marina development.
10	4	"Love Bait"	29 October 1988
When Sheila accidentally bumps her car into the Hon. Marcus Creighton (Jeremy Clyde), she expects a hefty bill for damages. Instead she is taken aback by his offer to support Neil in a business venture. But Neil is less than enthusiastic, much to the annoyance of Sheila.
11	5	"Concert Party"	5 November 1988
Whilst attending a welcome home party for one of his old pals, Neil is tempted to invest in a lucrative but risky shares scam. The problem is he needs a stake of £25,000.
12	6	"Round Up"	12 November 1988
Carol surprises Neil when she tells him that he if he keeps out of trouble until the hearing, he should apply for a bankruptcy discharge.

== Home media ==
The first series was released on DVD on 29 June 2009 by Fabulous Films and Fremantle Home Media Entertainment.
