= Daniel Buckroyd =

British theatre director

- Born: Chelmsford
- Occupations: Theatre director & CEO

Daniel Buckroyd is a British theatre director and current Artistic Director and CEO of the Lichfield Garrick Theatre.

Buckroyd has adapted several books by Michael Morpurgo for the stage, including The Butterfly Lion, Farm Boy, and Friend or Foe.

== Career ==
Buckroyd was Artistic Director of New Perspectives touring theatre company from 2003, Associate Director of the Nuffield Theatre, Artistic Director of Oxfordshire Touring Theatre Company, and Education Director of the Haymarket Theatre in Leicester. He served as Artistic Director of the Mercury Theatre from November 2012 until his appointment at Exeter Northcott Theatre in August 2018.

In 2014, Buckroyd directed the UK regional premiere of the George Stiles, Anthony Drewe and Cameron Mackintosh musical Betty Blue Eyes, co-produced with Salisbury Playhouse, West Yorkshire Playhouse and Liverpool Playhouse. Buckroyd's direction received positive critical reviews.

Buckroyd produced Clybourne Park, which toured six theatres in 2016. Also in 2016 he toured with his production of the Churchill Theatre's End of the Rainbow.

== Productions as Director ==
- 2011 Lark Rise to Candleford for New Perspectives Theatre Company
- 2011 Those Magnificent Men by Brian Mitchell and Joseph Nixon for New Perspectives Theatre Company
- 2012 The Honey Man by Tyrone Huggins for New Perspectives Theatre Company
- 2013 The Butterfly Lion by Michael Morpurgo at Mercury Theatre Colchester
- 2013 The History Boys by Alan Bennett at Mercury Theatre Colchester
- 2013 The Hired Man by Melvyn Bragg at Mercury Theatre Colchester
- 2013 The Opinion Makers by Brian Mitchell and Joseph Nixon at Mercury Theatre Colchester
- 2016 End of the Rainbow at Waterside Theatre, Aylesbury
