= War Horse (novel) =

Book by Michael Morpurgo

- First edition
- Author: Michael Morpurgo
- Language: English
- Genre: War novel
- Publisher: Kaye & Ward
- Publication date: 1982
- Publication place: United Kingdom
- Media type: Print (hardback & paperback)
- ISBN: 978-0-439-79664-4
- OCLC: 70630557
- Preceded by: The White Horse of Zennor: And Other Stories from below the Eagle's Nest
- Followed by: Farm Boy

War Horse is a British war novel by Michael Morpurgo. It was first published in Great Britain by Kaye & Ward in 1982. The story recounts the experiences of Joey, a horse bought by the Army for service in World War I in France and the attempts of 15-year-old Albert, his previous owner, to bring him safely home. It formed the basis of both an award-winning play (2007) and an acclaimed film adaptation (2011) by Steven Spielberg. The novel is often considered one of Morpurgo's best works, and its success spawned a sequel titled Farm Boy, which was published in October 1997.

== Genesis ==
After meeting a World War I veteran, Wilfred Ellis, who drank in his local pub at Iddesleigh and who had been in the Devon Yeomanry working with horses, Morpurgo began to think of telling the story of the universal suffering of the Great War through a horse's viewpoint, but was unsure that he could do it. He also met another villager, Captain Budgett, who had been in the cavalry in the Great War, and a third villager, Albert Weeks, who remembered the Army coming to the village to buy horses. Morpurgo thanks these three men in the dedication of the book.

With his wife, Morpurgo had founded Farms for City Children, a charity where inner city children live and work on rural farms for a week. Interviewed by Fi Glover on Saturday Live on BBC Radio 4 in December 2010, Morpurgo recounted the event that convinced him he could write the book:

One of the kids who came to the farm from Birmingham, a boy called Billy, the teachers warned me that he had a stammer and told me not to ask him direct questions because it would terrify him if he had to be made to speak because he doesn’t speak...I came in the last evening into the yard behind this big Victorian house where they all live, and there he was, Billy, standing in his slippers by the stable door and the lantern above his head, talking. Talking, talking, talking, to the horse. And the horse, Hebe, had her head just over the top of the stable, and she was listening; that’s what I noticed, that the ears were going, and I knew she knew that she had to stay there whilst this went on, because this kid wanted to talk, and the horse wanted to listen—this was a two way thing...I went and got the teachers, and brought them up through the vegetable garden, and we stood there in the shadows, and we listened to Billy talking, and they were completely amazed how this child who couldn’t get a word out—the words were simply flowing. All the fear had gone, and there was something about the intimacy of this relationship, the trust building up between boy and horse, that I found enormously moving, and I thought: Well yes, you could write a story about the First World War through the eyes of a horse, and yes, the horse didn't understand every word, but she knew it was important for her to stand there and be there for this child."

Another inspiration for the book, after meeting the veterans and seeing Billy with Hebe the horse, was an old oil painting that Morpurgo's wife Clare had been left: "It was a very frightening and alarming painting, not the sort you'd want to hang on a wall. It showed horses during the First World War charging into barbed wire fences. It haunted me." The painting was by F. W. Reed and was dated 1917, and showed a British cavalry charge on German lines, with horses entangled in barbed wire. Morpurgo wrote a fictionalised version of this painting in his "Author's Note" at the start of the book. In his version, the painting shows a red bay with a white cross on his forehead, and the painting bears the legend: "Joey. Painted by Captain James Nicholls, autumn 1914.")

== Plot ==
Farmer Ted Narracott buys a colt for 3 guineas when he was supposed to buy a calf at an auction. Ted's son, Albert, names the horse Joey and grows to love him, protecting him when Ted is drunk. While with the Narracotts, Joey forms a strong bond with old Zoey, the farm work horse.

Ted sells Joey to the army before Albert can stop him. Albert tries to sign up for the army, but he is too young but promises to come back for Joey. Joey is trained for cavalry service by Corporal Perkins, and Captain James Nicholls is his original rider, leading a unit of mounted infantry. Joey soon befriends Topthorn, a horse ridden by Captain Jamie Stewart. During a charge against the Germans, Nicholls is killed. Stewart assigns Trooper Warren, a nervous young man who rides heavier but is kind, to ride Joey.

During another charge, Topthorn and Joey carry Warren and Stewart into the enemy lines, and are the only two of many, but they are captured by the Germans. They use Joey and Topthorn to pull an ambulance cart for the hospital, where the two are famous and respected for saving many lives. The Germans allow Emilie and her grandfather, who live in a farm near the front lines, to care for Joey and Topthorn. Emilie grows to love the horses like Albert loved Joey, caring for their injuries and feeding them every night. Soon, the Germans move their hospital somewhere else, and Emilie and her grandfather are allowed to keep the horses, who they use for their farm. Topthorn was not bred to plow, but learns from Joey, who has experience from the Narracott farm.

Soon, however, Germans pass by their farm, and take away the horses to pull their artillery wagon. The two meet Friedrich, who befriends them and tries to care for them, growing to love Topthorn and telling them that he did not want to be a soldier. Joey and Topthorn are two of the last few survivors of the artillery-pulling team. One day, after drinking water with Joey, Topthorn dies from heart failure. The Allied artillery starts shelling right after the Germans and Friedrich is killed. After seeing an Allied tank for the first time, Joey runs in terror and is wounded by barbed wire before breaking free. Both the Allied and German soldiers see the wounded Joey in no-man's-land, and a British soldier wins possession of him by flipping a coin with a German soldier and winning. However, their few minutes of friendly peace create a bond between the two before they separate.

At the veterinary hospital, Joey happens to be cared for by Albert, who works there and has a friend named David. Albert realizes that Joey is his old horse only after cleaning all the mud off him, and seeing how he responds to his whistle. Albert starts caring for Joey again like he used to. Later, David and two horses from the hospital are killed by a stray shell, putting Albert in a state of depression, as David had cared for him like a brother. At the end of the war, Major Martin announces that they will auction off all the horses, despite the protests of Sergeant Thunder and the rest of the soldiers. During the auction, Sergeant Thunder loses to an old man for Joey. The man is Emilie's grandfather and was looking for Joey. Emilie's grandfather tells Albert about how Joey and Topthorn came to their farm, and that Emilie had lost the will to live after they were taken from her, with Emilie fading away and dying at just 15 years old. Emilie's grandfather sells Joey to Albert for a cheap price, in return for telling people about Emilie, and keeping her memory alive. Albert and Joey return to England, where they live in peace and Joey meets Albert's girlfriend, Maisie, with whom he does not get along very well.

== Awards ==
The book was runner-up for the Whitbread Book Award in 1982.

== Adaptations ==
The book has also been made into a play adapted by Nick Stafford. The play, also called War Horse, was staged at the Olivier Theatre, National Theatre in London. The production opened on 17 October 2007 and was met with critical acclaim – its use of life-size puppets of horses from the Handspring Puppet Company won an Olivier Award, Evening Standard Theatre Award and Critics' Circle Theatre Award for design. In February 2010 it was revealed that the play would transfer to Broadway in New York City, and has since been seen in separate and touring productions in Canada, Australia, South Africa, the Netherlands, and Japan, as well as translations into German (Gefährten) and Chinese (战马). The play continues to tour successfully around the world.

In May 2010, it was announced Steven Spielberg would direct the movie adaptation with Richard Curtis and Lee Hall writing the screenplay. Jeremy Irvine was cast in the lead role. The full cast was revealed on 17 June 2010. It was released on 25 December 2011.

A radio adaptation of the book was broadcast on BBC Radio 2 on 8 November 2008. It featured Timothy Spall starring as the voice of Albert, Brenda Blethyn as Mother and Bob Hoskins as Sergeant Thunder. The radio play was rebroadcast on BBC Radio 4 Extra on 11 November 2011 as part of a special Remembrance sequence.

A Welsh version of the novel, adapted by Casia Wiliam and titled Ceffyl Rhyfel, was published by Gwasg Carreg Gwalch in 2010.

== Further information ==
War Horse is one of five children's books that deal with war that was featured in a special exhibition titled Once Upon a Wartime – Classic War Stories for Children at the Imperial War Museum in London, that ran from 11 February – 30 October 2011. The exhibition details the historical background to the story, and exhibits include pages from Morpurgo's original draft of the novel.

On its first publication in 1982 the book was only translated into a 'handful' of languages. As a side effect of the interest in the film adaptation by Steven Spielberg, the publishers of the book have recently been "inundated" with requests for translation rights for the book to coincide with the film's release in late 2011.

The painting mentioned in the preface of the book, a portrait of Joey painted by Captain Nicholls and now hanging in the Village Hall (of an unnamed village), was a fiction of Morpurgo's. However, particularly since the success of the stage version of the book, so many tourists have come to the village of Iddesleigh, where Morpurgo lives, and asked to see the painting in the village hall, that in 2011 Morpurgo commissioned an artist to paint just such an oil painting to hang there. He used equine artist Ali Bannister, who acted as the chief "equine hair and make-up" artist on the Steven Spielberg film of the book and who also drew the sketches of Joey seen in the film.

An exhibition entitled War Horse: Fact & Fiction opened in October 2011 at the National Army Museum exploring the novel alongside real-life stories of horses involved in war and the men who depended on them, and also drawing on the play and film adaptations of the novel.

== Sequel ==
Michael Morpurgo wrote a sequel called Farm Boy, which was released in October 1997.
