= Farm Boy (novel) =

1997 British children's novel

- First edition
- Author: Michael Morpurgo
- Illustrator: Michael Foreman
- Language: English
- Series: War Horse
- Genre: Historical Fiction, Children's literature
- Publisher: Pavilion Books
- Publication date: 1997
- Publication place: United Kingdom
- Pages: 112
- ISBN: 978-0007450657
- Preceded by: War Horse

Farm Boy is a British children's novel written by Michael Morpurgo, and illustrated by Michael Foreman. The book is the sequel to the popular novel War Horse. The book was first published in the United Kingdom in 1997 by Pavilion Books. It was republished in 1999 by HarperCollins Children's Book. The novel was adapted into a stage play in 2010.

== Plot ==
The story begins in "Burrow", the young boy enjoys regularly visiting his Grandpa, especially during summer. He imagines himself driving the old green Fordson tractor kept in the back of the barn. It is acknowledged that this tractor is very important. The grandfather tells the boy he loves swallows because they were the first birds he ever saw. When his Father was young (the protagonist's great-grandfather) the Father pinched sparrow and rook eggs because they interfered with the farm; his Father left the swallows' nests alone because they never bothered his farm. The Father even punched a friend for stealing from a swallow's nest, getting Father into trouble. Father is described as always getting into fights when he was younger.

The protagonist's Grandpa then describes events between his own Father and a horse named Joey, indicating that the pair were Albert and Joey from the original novel. He describes the lengths his Father went to protect Joey, even joining the army to find Joey after he was sold to the military during WWI. Father, who was only 14 years old when he joined, lied about his age. This section is primarily a flashback to the previous book and the events around and before the war, but from another perspective. After such events and the end of WWI, the protagonist's great-grandfather was commonly referred to as the "Corporal" by the townspeople.

Now a young adult, the protagonist visits his Grandpa during the summer. Grandpa asks the boy to help him learn to read and write. As a child, the Grandfather had to help with the farm because his Father as the Corporal had a permanent leg injury from the war, making farm work difficult. The Grandpa's wife attempted to teach him after the protagonist's mother and her siblings had left the farm, but unfortunately she died unexpectedly. Grandpa was left distraught and embarrassed. Grandpa makes a bet with the protagonist that if he can read Agatha Christie and even write a short story by Christmas he will give the boy a hundred pounds. He also offers to pay the protagonist for teaching him to read and write while he is living and working on the farm.

Thanks to Grandpa's determination, on Christmas Eve he walks with the protagonist into the barn to read him Death on the Nile by Agatha Christie and by New Year he is able to read the book word for word. In February the boy travels to Australia. On the train, he finds an envelope, containing the £100 from the bet and a story written by Grandpa.

The story is a recollection of how the Corporal, his two horses Joey and Zoey and his son (Grandpa) challenge an arrogant farmer, Harry Medlicott, in a bet where if the horses ploughed more than Medlicott's tractor, the Corporal receives his tractor. Despite determination from the Corporal, at the beginning of the bet the tractor easily pulls ahead, however after the break it refuses to start again. When the tractor starts back up again the Corporal is slightly in the lead, however Medlicott quickly catches, and the Corporal can no longer bear the strain due to his injury. Grandpa takes over and leads the horses in ploughing. In a surprising turn of events Medlicott accidentally tips the tractor over into a ditch, allowing Grandpa to just barely pull ahead and win. The tractor is the same one which resides in Grandpa's barn in the protagonist's time. This leads the protagonist to deciding to study engineering at college, before returning to the farm to live and work there while also fixing up the tractor so it is one day usable again.

== Characters ==
- Main protagonist – A young boy, who is the great-grandson of Albert. He lives in London, but often visits Grandpa over the summer.
- Grandpa – The grandfather of the protagonist and the son of Albert. He regularly tells stories to the protagonist about his life and the stories he learned of his Father.
- Albert/Father/Corporal – The father of Grandpa and the original owner of Joey. He is a character from the book War Horse as well as this book.
- Joey – the younger horse owned by Albert and the main protagonist from the prequel War Horse. While the first book is narrated by Joey, Farm Boy is narrated entirely by humans.
- Zoey – An old mare and the second horse that Albert owns. Zoey is older than Joey by about 5 years and was on Albert's farm when Albert was a child before Joey.
- Harry Medlicott – A rich neighbouring farmer, who believes that his new tractor is far superior to Albert's horses Joey and Zoey.

== Background ==
I know every lane, every hedge and every field in the book because it's right outside my window.

— Michael Morpurgo

Morpurgo said he was persuaded to write the sequel by his frequent collaborator, British author and illustrator, Michael Foreman, who proposed the story to be "about how tractors changed the face of farming". In addition, he received numerous inquiries from kids wanting to know what happens to Joey after World War I. Morpurgo also opined that the novel was his favourite amongst his works. He went on to say that it's kind of a sequel to War Horse, but really it's not, "it's just that the War Horse story comes into it; it's much more about a horse coming back after the First World War and what happens to that horse back on the farm". Another reason Morpurgo is so fond of the book is because the story is actually set in the same Devon parish where he resides.

== Reception ==
Jana Siciliano from Teenreads wrote that the novel "is perfect for a young adventurous reader who loves history, animals and family stories all put together. The prose may be easy to read, but the emotion is dug in as deeply as the burrows on Grandpa's farm". In her review for The Booklist, Hazel Rochman noted that "with black-and-white illustrations in watercolor and pencil on every page, the first-person narratives tell of the rich bonds across generations, the warmth of farm life, and the power of words".

Lee Bock of the School Library Journal stated "the book is generously illustrated with Foreman's soft watercolor-and-pencil illustrations and period posters, flyers, and advertisements; while some children will genuinely appreciate the style and content of this well-designed book, its appeal will be mostly to adults". Kirkus Reviews opined that "Foreman focuses on the flashbacks, depicting rural and wartime scenes with faded colors; although the grandfather and the narrator, who has grown into young manhood by the end, appear only occasionally, their warm mutual regard for one another comes through clearly, anchoring this expertly crafted reminder that stories can link generations".

Jeremiah Clabough from Childhood Education said "the literary technique of telling a story within a story will be familiar to readers of Morpurgo's works; Foreman's soft charcoal sketches capture the feelings and emotions of people in the historical time periods being discussed; Farm Boy is a moving story that captures the feelings and stories that bind a family together, regardless of generational difference".

== Play adaptation ==
Actor John Walters sitting on the Fordson, a prop for the play

The novel was adapted into a stage play in 2010, by British theatre director Daniel Buckroyd, for the Nottingham based New Perspectives. It enjoyed full runs in both the West End theatre and the National Theatre. During its run at the National Theatre, his wife arranged for him to have a small part in the play, as an extra in the crowd scene.

In her review for The Daily Telegraph, Sarah Crompton noted how the "rusty old Fordson" takes centre stage. She further stated that the play is "simply but effectively told, with a minimum of props and costume changes". She complimented the sole two actors in the play, Matt Powell who "brings to the part of the grandson a sunny optimism"; and John Walters who played the grandfather, for being "both dignified and riveting, as he doesn’t play for pathos, and in his understatement he allows the words to work harder". She summed up her review stating, "in the end, the very bareness of the piece, its reliance on the power of words alone, is a reminder that theatre doesn't always need puppets and effects to hold the attention".

In its 2011 off-Broadway debut at 59E59 Theaters, it "played to packed houses". Morpurgo attributed the success to the fact that the United States is "more appreciative of its Devon rural settings than England; in America the connection to the countryside is very strong; rural life here is now thought to be antique and nostalgic but in America there's a nobility to it". As of February 2024, the play was still running, with its performance at Garrick Theatre in the City of Westminster, featuring actors Jonathan Houlston and Alan Booty.
