= Bang Bang! (play) =

2017 play

- Written by: John Cleese; Georges Feydeau (original)
- Genre: Comedy

Premiere
- Date premiered: 24 February 2017
- Place premiered: Mercury Theatre, Colchester

Bang Bang! is a comedy play by John Cleese. It is an adaptation of the French play Monsieur chasse! by Georges Feydeau

== Productions ==
The play made its world premiere at the Mercury Theatre, Colchester, from 24 February to 11 March 2017. The American premiere of the play opened at the Shadowland Stages, in Ellenville, New York, from 10 August to 9 September 2018. A new production of the play, directed by Daniel Buckroyd and produced by Dermot McLaughlin, Charles H. Duggan and Brian Zucker, opened at the Northcott Theatre, Exeter, before touring the UK from February 2020.

== Critical reception ==
2017/2018 Production The reviewer in The Daily Telegraph wrote: "Cleese seems to have contented himself with stuffing the original with coarse, cheap jokes. When Richard Earl's charmless doctor is rejected by Leontine, he tells her to shove it where the sun don't shine. Sorry to be prudish, but I could have done without such crudities. Characters keep breaking the fourth wall to inform the audience what a nightmare it all is, but being told a situation is getting out of control is not the same as feeling it. Disappointing". The Times described the adaptation as "a production that falls short of hilarity … more creak creak than bang bang … It's Feydeau without fizz". The Stage was more positive noting that "amid the... tight direction there are several laugh-out-loud moments."

2020 Production The reviewer in LondonTheatre1 wrote: "David Shields’ set is brilliantly designed, beginning at Monsieur and Madame Duchotel's (Tony Gardner and Tessa Peake-Jones) Parisian home and switching to Madame Latour's (Wendi Peters) chambers. The set cleverly swivels around and the Duchotel's saloon door becomes the door to the balcony, the door to Duchotel's dressing room becomes a wardrobe and a bookcase becomes the door to a second room in the chambers; plenty of entrance and exit opportunities here. While the scenery is being changed after the first act by the male cast members dressed in brown coats, Mme. Latour relates the story of her life in song, with the scene-shifters joining in and moving the furniture in time with the music. This production must be hard work for the excellent cast, as the action is fast-paced and often requires precision timing. For the audience, there is no such pressure; the story is a typical farce involving extramarital affairs, slamming doors and plenty of trouser dropping. The double standards of France in the 1890s are still rich pickings for comedy. Mme. Latour has just evicted a tenant for her disreputable behaviour, having multiple assignations with scruffy young men for cash. Her chambers are for the assignations of respectable married men and women, in one case they are actually married to each other. It is surprising that this play is so little known, it is comedy gold in the hands of this fantastic cast. Tessa Peake-Jones, Tony Gardner, and Richard Earl (Dr. Moricet) give a master class in farce. Wendi Peters’ facial expressions alone reduced me to tears of laughter. There are plenty of “asides” and interactions with the audience. Cast and audience all seemed to be thoroughly enjoying themselves. I am so pleased that I got to see this production, I highly recommend it."
