= Wooden Overcoats =

British sitcom podcast

- Genre: Comedy
- Language: English

Creative team
- Created by: David K. Barnes
- Written by: David K. Barnes

Cast and voices
- Starring: Belinda Lang; Felix Trench; Beth Eyre; Ciara Baxendale; Tom Crowley; Andy Secombe; Steve Hodson; Sean Baker; Alison Skilbeck

Publication
- No. of seasons: 4
- No. of episodes: 34
- Original release: September 24, 2015 – March 31, 2022

Reception
- Ratings: 4.7924528301886795/5

Related
- Website: www.woodenovercoats.com

Wooden Overcoats is a British sitcom podcast created and written by David K. Barnes, and directed and produced by Andy Goddard and John Wakefield. It premiered on September 24, 2015, and completed its run on March 31, 2022 with the conclusion of its fourth season.

The series is set in the fictional Channel Islands village of Piffling Vale and follows two misanthropic siblings whose business has been in charge of all of the island's funerals for generations until a new, cheerful funeral director opens a competing funeral home.

== Plot ==
Stubborn undertaker Rudyard Funn runs Funn Funerals with the help of his asocial sister Antigone and their assistant Georgie Crusoe. Funn Funerals, which was previously owned by Rudyard and Antigone's parents, is the only funeral parlour in the village of Piffling Vale, which is located on a small, isolated English island; as such, despite Rudyard's unpopularity within the community, his business has remained successful due to the absence of available competition.

The situation changes with the arrival of a new undertaker, Eric Chapman, who establishes a competing business in the town square. Chapman's approach proves popular among the residents of Piffling Vale and his company gains greater prominence than the more traditional Funn Funerals. As a result, the siblings face a decline in business, leading to a rivalry between the two firms as they attempt to maintain their position.

Tensions progressively heighten as the feud spirals out of control, with Funn Funeral's increasingly over-the-top attempts to sabotage Chapman soon affecting the entire village. These unfolding events are narrated by Madeleine, a mouse that resides in Funn Funerals and is Rudyard's best friend.

== Cast and characters ==
=== Main ===
- Belinda Lang as Madeleine, a mouse who lives at Funn Funerals and Rudyard's best friend. She acts as the narrator of the story, which she dutifully records in the hopes of releasing them as a biographical book, "Memoirs of a Funeral House Mouse". She only makes mouse squeak noises (performed by Holly Campbell) when not acting as a narrator to the audience, although several of the show's characters understand her when she squeaks.
- Felix Trench as Rudyard Funn, the owner and funeral director of Funn Funerals, in charge of interacting with clients and organizing the ceremonies. Stubborn, caring only about his work, and lacking empathy for his grieving clients, he develops an immediate hatred of Chapman, both out of jealousy for his success and out of contempt for his cheery methods and behavior. Unpopular among the citizens of Piffling Vale and caring little for them, he sets out to outdo Chapman in any possible way.
- Beth Eyre as Antigone Funn, Rudyard's twin sister and the mortician of Funn Funerals, in charge of preparing the corpses for the funerals. A shut-in who suffers from severe lifelong depression and went through many years of near-total social isolation in the funeral house, to the point where most villagers believe she has died, she differs from her brother in that her reluctance to engage in social interaction stems from fear rather than disinterest. Spending most of her time in the funeral house's mortuary, which she considers her sacred haven, she is gloomy and even more socially inept than her brother, but is passionate about her work, and becomes more confident and assertive over the course of the series, notably becoming Funn Funerals' co-owner alongside Rudyard at the end of season 1. Although she despises Chapman as a competitor, she is also irresistibly attracted to him.
- Ciara Baxendale as Georgie Crusoe, the Funns' assistant, notably in charge of building and carrying the coffins. Confident, resourceful and more socially skilled than the siblings, she is a considerable asset to them, although she is often reluctant or too lazy to provide more effort than the minimum. Having started to work with the Funns after arriving to Piffling Vale with her grandmother prior to the beginning of the series, she is originally uncaring and emotionally detached from them, but grows closer to them over the course of the series. She later takes on a second job as Mayor Desmond's secretary.
- Tom Crowley as Eric Chapman, a new arrival in Piffling Vale who opens a funeral home of his own. His positive, wholesome behavior is completely at odd with Rudyard's, as is his vision of funerals, which he makes party-like and cheerful instead of sober. He is very popular with the villagers, and is very competitive in his feud with Funn Funerals, although he remains cordial towards them. Little is known about his life prior to his arrival, although he occasionally hints at having a dark and mysterious past.
- Andy Secombe as Reverend Nigel Wavering, who is tasked with delivering eulogies at funerals, and therefore often works with funeral houses. Despite being a Reverend, he is actually an agnostic, and as such his eulogies are filled with lengthy statements conveying religious ideas while questioning them.
- Steve Hodson (season 1) and Sean Baker (season 2-4) as Mayor Desmond Desmond, the longstanding mayor of Piffling Vale and Nigel's boyfriend. Good-hearted but clueless, forgetful and fairly incompetent, he usually lets his assistant do most of the work, although he does not realize it himself. Hodson portrays the character in the first season, but was unavailable for season 2 and replaced by Baker; in reference to Hodson previously voicing the character, he makes a cameo in the series finale as Desmond's twin brother, also named Desmond.
- Alison Skilbeck as Agatha Doyle, the owner of the village's candy shop and an on-and-off detective.

=== Recurring ===
- Andy Hamilton as Herbert Cough, the owner of the island's sole cinema
- David K. Barnes as Dr. Henry Edgware, the overworked, sole medical doctor in all of Piffling Vale
- Catriona Knox as Lady Vivienne Templar, a hypersexual who loves gossip
- Paul Putner as Sid Marlowe, the editor-in-chief of Piffling Vale's sole newspaper, Piffling Matters.
- Julia Deakin as Nana Crusoe (season 1-3), Georgie grandmother and only family
- Elle McAlpine as Marjorie Smith (regular season 1-2, 4), Mayor Desmond's secretary. Due to his forgetfulness and incompetence, she ends up doing almost all of his work for him.
- Alana Ross as Jennifer Delacroix (season 2-4), an amateur journalist who broadcasts her radio news show from her mother's house. She later becomes Georgie's girlfriend.
- Ellie Dickens as Miss Dottie Scruple (season 1), an elderly inhabitant
- Sarah Thom as Petunia Bloom (season 1), Pillfling's prime flower merchant of Piffling
- Jason Forbes, Phil Wang and Ella Garland as Baz, Wez and Roz (season 1-2), the so called "local village hoodlums" who spend their time undergoing in-depth conversations about art and philosophy
- Emily Stride as Marlene Magdalena (season 2-4), a fierce, whip-wielding circus directo
- Amy Rockson as Zoe Adeyinka (season 4), an old acquaintance of Eric Chapman

=== Notable guests ===
- Kieran Hodgson as Serge (season 1), a character in a film Antigone is watching
- Max Olesker as Seymour Profitte (season 1), a man who commissions the Funns as part of a tax evasion scheme
- Thom Tuck as Captain Scott Sodbury (season 1), the keeper of the island's lighthouse
- Caroline Quentin as Madam Lansbury Manning (season 2), a medium whose work Antigone studies
- Hugh Fraser as Roger Noggins (season 2), a man who arranges his own funeral for the day he is convinced will be his last
- Ben Norris as Miles Fahrenheit (season 2), a local with a foul mouth
- Katy Manning as Bijou the Clown (season 2), a clown who left a lasting impact on Antigone as a child

== Episodes ==
=== Series 1 ===
List of episodes for Wooden Overcoats Series 1
No. overall	No. in series	Title	Written by	Original release date
1	1	"The Bane of Rudyard"	David K. Barnes	24 September 2015
2	2	"Flowers for Chapman"	Christopher Hogg	1 October 2015
3	3	"The Little Death"	Tom Crowley	8 October 2015
4	4	"Tempting Fête"	David K. Barnes	15 October 2015
5	5	"She Stoops to Conquer"	T. A. Woodsmith	22 October 2015
6	6	"Georgina and the Waves"	David K. Barnes	29 October 2015
7	7	"The Cliffhanger"	Cordelia Lynn	5 November 2015
8	8	"The Trial of Rudyard"	David K. Barnes	12 November 2015

=== Series 2 ===
List of episodes for Wooden Overcoats Series 2
No. overall	No. in series	Title	Written by
9	1	"The Ghost of Piffling Vale"	Molly Beth Morossa & David K. Barnes
10	2	"A Funeral House Divided"	James Hamilton & James Huntrods
11	3	"Take a Letter Miss Crusoe!"	David K. Barnes
12	4	"The Sweet, Sweet Taste of Death"	David K. Barnes
13	5	"Flip Flap Flop"	T. A. Woodsmith
14	6	"Rudyard Makes a Friend"	Cordelia Lynn & David K. Barnes
15	7	"Undertakers Underground"	David K. Barnes
16	8	"There Ought to be Clowns"	David K. Barnes
Holiday special
		"Rudyard Ruins Christmas"	Tom Crowley & David K. Barnes

=== Series 3 ===
List of episodes for Wooden Overcoats Series 3
No. overall	No. in series	Title	Written by
17	1	"The Loneliness of the Short-Tempered Rudyard"	David K. Barnes
18	2	"Altar Ego"	James Hamilton & James Huntrods
19	3	"Rudyard Takes a Hike"	Rosie Fletcher
20	4	"The Race for Piffling"	Tom Crowley
21	5	"Antigone in the Spotlight"	David K. Barnes
22	6	"Tinker Tailor Undertaker"	David K. Barnes
23	7	"The Sunshine Treatment"	Molly Beth Morossa
24	8	"Putting the Funn in Funerals"	David K. Barnes
Holiday special
		"Rudyard Ruins Summer"	Alex Lynch & David K. Barnes

=== Series 4 ===
List of episodes for Wooden Overcoats Series 4
No. overall	No. in series	Title	Written by
25	1	"The Body Snatchers"	David K. Barnes
26	2	"Old School Funn"	Ben Cottam
27	3	"The Big Cheese"	Tom Crowley
28	4	"A Match Made in Piffling"	David K. Barnes
29	5	"Dead Man's Chest"	Sarah Shachat
30	6	"Radio Drama"	Gabriel Urbina
31	7	"In the Buff"	Molly Beth Morossa
32	8	"Once Upon a Long Time Ago"	David K. Barnes
33	9	"The Last Nail in the Coffin"	Alex Lynch & David K. Barnes
34	10	"A Funn Farewell"	David K. Barnes
Holiday special
		"Rudyard Ruins Hallowe’en"	David K. Barnes, James Hamilton & James Huntrods

=== Supplemental episodes ===
==== Piffling Lives ====
List of episodes for Wooden Overcoats Series 4
Title	Written by
"Random Mouse"	Rosie Fletcher
"Agatha Doyle and the Honeytrap"	Tom Crowley
"The Casebook of Dr Edgware"	Tom Crowley & David K. Barnes
"Sid / Desmond"	David K. Barnes
"Island of Passion"	Rosie Fletcher

==== Funn Fragments ====
List of episodes for Wooden Overcoats Series 4
Title	Written by
"Antigone Antagonized"	Ben Cottam
"At Home in the Dark"	Lauren Shippen
"The Social Rudyard"	Chris Hogg
"Practical Magic"	Gabriel Urbina
"The Full Works"	Alex Lynch
"Eric's Pal"	Felix Trench
"Autumn Cleaning"	Ella Watts
"Rolo"	Chris & Jen Sugden
"Graveyard Shift"	Sarah Shachat
"The Smart Coffin"	Mac Rogers

==== The Trouble With Rudyard ====
List of episodes for Wooden Overcoats Series 4
Title	Written by
"The Trouble With Rudyard"	David K. Barnes

==== Rudyard Ruins Everything: A Very Mini Series ====
List of episodes for Rudyard Ruins Everything
No. in series	Title	Written by
1	"DAY 1"	David K. Barnes
2	"DAY 2"	David K. Barnes
3	"DAY 3"	David K. Barnes
4	"DAY 4"	David K. Barnes

== Production ==
The idea of a story involving two competing undertakers arose from discussions between eventual cast members Felix Trench and Tom Crowley. Trench shared a lodging in London with writer David K. Barnes, who was looking for a new project. The initial idea was to create a short film out of the idea, but the large budget required to do that, and also the increasing popularity of podcasts, meant Wooden Overcoats became an audio project.

Much of the series was recorded in a repurposed music studio. Narration was recorded in an audiobook studio and there were also scenes recorded on-location.

Wooden Overcoats concluded after four seasons, released between 2015 and 2022. A number of live shows were also done at Kings Place in Kings Cross, London, as episodes from the fourth season were released in early 2022. The final episode, A Funn Farewell, was released on 31 March 2022.

A one-off episode was broadcast live from the London Podcast Festival on 7 September 2025 to mark the tenth anniversary of the series. Rudyard Ruins Everything was performed in front of a live audience with original cast members Trench, Eyre, Crowley, Baxendale, and Secombe reprising their roles and Alice Osmanski playing the part of Madeleine. The story was subsequently recorded and released as a four-episode miniseries, with episodes released daily between 24 and 26 September 2026.

On 8 July 2026, a new episode, Rudyard On The Moon, was announced. The episode was performed live at the London Podcast Festival on 6 September 2026, with the performance also available via an online stream.

== Reception ==
=== Critical reception ===
Wooden Overcoats received an extremely positive critical reception, with the New Statesman describing the series as "funnier than anything broadcast on the BBC". In another favourable comparison to the BBC, the Daily Telegraph stated in 2018 that the "release of this funny, clever, independently produced sitcom marks a quietly significant moment in British radio comedy, when the BBC networks stopped being the only conduit by which top-rank young writers and actors got their wares to market."

Writing for the New York Times, Phoebe Letts wrote, "over the four available seasons of “Wooden Overcoats,” it becomes impossible not to adore everyone in the village.” And in the Reader's Digest, Chloë Nannestad stated that, “this podcast is hilarious, charming, there’s three seasons of it to fill your longest driving day and there’s also a mouse called Madeleine. Download immediately".

Wooden Overcoats has been described as a "shining example of the power of the form (of audio drama)” by Forbes, a "very funny, very British radio drama" by Wired and a "hit podcast" by The Independent.

=== Awards and nominations ===
Year	Award	Category	Recipient	Result	Ref.
2016	Prix Europa	Digital Audio	Wooden Overcoats	Nominated	
2016	Audio Verse Awards	Best Original, Long Form, Large Cast, Ongoing, Comedic Production	Wooden Overcoats	Won	
2016	Audio Verse Awards	Best Performance of an Actor in an Original Leading Role for a Long Form, Large Cast Production	Felix Trench	Won	
2017	British Podcast Awards	Best Fiction	Wooden Overcoats	Silver	
2017	Audio Verse Awards	Best Writing for an Ongoing, Comedic, Production	David K. Barnes	Won	
2017	Audio Verse Awards	Best Actress in an Ensemble role for an Ongoing, Comedic, Production	Beth Eyre	Won	
2018	Audio Verse Awards	Best Audio Engineering of an Ongoing, Long-form, Comedic Production	Andy Goddard and John Wakefield	Won	
2018	Audio Verse Awards	Best Original Composition for an Ongoing, Comedic Production	James Whittle	Won	
2018	Audio Verse Awards	Best Ongoing, Long-form, Comedic Production	Wooden Overcoats	Won	
2018	Audio Verse Awards	Best Writing of an Ongoing, Long-form, Comedic Production	David K. Barnes, Tom Crowley, Rosie Fletcher, Molly Beth Morossa, James Huntrods, James Hamilton, Alex Lynch	Won	
2018	Audio Verse Awards	Best Performance of a Role in the Ensemble of an Ongoing, Comedic Production	Beth Eyre	Won	
2022	British Podcast Awards	Best Fiction	Wooden Overcoats	Nominated	
2022	Audio Verse Awards	Best Performer in an Existing Production	Felix Trench	Won	
2022	Audio Verse Awards	Best Existing Audio Play Production	Wooden Overcoats	Won	
2023	British Podcast Awards	Best Fiction	Wooden Overcoats	gold	
2026	Golden Lobes	Best Scripted Show	Wooden Overcoats	Nominated	
