= The Butterfly Lion =

British 1996 children's novel

- First edition cover
- Author: Michael Morpurgo
- Illustrator: Christian Birmingham
- Language: English
- Genre: Children's novel
- Publisher: HarperCollins
- Publication date: 1996
- Publication place: United Kingdom
- Media type: Print
- Pages: 128
- Awards: Smarties book prize Writers' Guild Award
- ISBN: 978-0-00-675103-8

The Butterfly Lion is a children's novel by Michael Morpurgo. It was first published in Great Britain by Collins in 1996, and won the 1996 Smarties book prize. The book was adapted into a stage play by Daniel Buckroyd of the Mercury Theatre, Colchester, which toured the UK in 2013.

== Plot ==
A young boy named Michael runs away from a boarding school and meets an old lady living in a big cottage. She tells him about a boy named Bertie who lived in South Africa. As a boy, Bertie had found an orphaned white lion cub, but was eventually forced to send the lion away to the circus and leave South Africa to attend boarding school in Wiltshire, England. Bertie escapes from his school and meets Millie, and the two become fast friends, flying kites together. He tells Millie all about his life in South Africa, and his white lion cub. When the pair leave school, they continue to write until war breaks out, and a letter arrives from Bertie informing Millie that he has joined the army.

Later, when fighting in France in the First World War, he saves two men's lives and is given a Victoria Cross. Millie, who has become a nurse in the hopes of finding Bertie, reads about him in a newspaper and the two are reunited. Together they discover that Monsieur Merlot's circus has closed down, but that the Frenchman lives nearby with the lion. Bertie marries Millie and brings the lion back to England, where they live happily for many years. When the lion dies, Bertie and Millie carve a lion out of the chalk in the hillside in memorial, before Bertie dies himself.

After being told the story, Michael returns to school. He finds a plaque commemorating Bertie's heroic acts in the war, and learns from a teacher that Millie died only a few months after Bertie. Michael goes back to the house, finding it deserted. He then hears Millie's voice asking him to look after the chalk lion on the hill.

== Release and stage play ==
The novel was first published in Great Britain by Collins in 1996, and won the 1996 Smarties book prize, and the Writers' Guild Award in 1995.

The book was adapted into a stage play by Daniel Buckroyd of the Mercury Theatre, Colchester, which toured the UK in 2013. The play featured Gwen Taylor and Adam Buchanan in the title roles. British theatre critic Lyn Gardner said in his review of the play that "this is a gripping and ultimately touching couple of hours, made all the more compelling by Daniel Buckroyd's staging ... Buckroyd is as much a storyteller as Morpurgo, and while the narration is initially a little clumsy and overemphatic, and the physical theatre element somewhat overworked, the performances find rhythm and power ... it may be an old-fashioned, nostalgic story, but music, storytelling, design, puppetry and stagecraft come together".

== Reviews ==
Gebregeorgis Yohannes wrote in the School Library Journal; "this touching story is well written and emotionally satisfying. Readers will be drawn to this fascinating tale of a unique friendship between boy and beast. In addition to being a successful adventure story, the book demonstrates the value of character – of keeping promises standing up for one's beliefs, and courage under fire". Nick Smurthwaite of Design Week said "the combination of Morpurgo's imaginative story-telling and Birmingham's lovingly detailed pictures has proved to be one of the biggest success stories of children's literature in the 1990s".

Publishers Weekly said in their review that the "conclusion is sweet, but unless readers can picture the famous White Horse on the hillside at Uffington, they will have difficulty imagining an adult Bertie and his wife carving out a similar picture of the white lion or blue butterflies alighting on it en masse to drink on the chalk face – concepts critical to the book's conclusion".

In her review for the Booklist, Kathleen Squires wrote "the story sounds hokey, but Morpurgo evocatively captures the South African landscape and presents young, lonely Bertie's heartbreak and his blossoming friendship and love for Millie with genuine emotion and tender poignancy. Eventually, a reunion does come after Bertie goes off to fight the war in France. When the lion finally dies, Bertie and Millie honor it by carving a monument that attracts beautiful blue butterflies. With just the right mix of tension and romance, this short, sophisticated novel will appeal especially to animal lovers".
