= Nigel Whitmey =

British actor

- Born: 17 March 1963 (age 63); Peace River, Alberta, Canada
- Occupation: Actor
- Years active: 1989–present
- Spouse: Abigail Thaw (m. 1986)
- Children: 2

Nigel Whitmey (born 17 March 1963) is a British actor who has appeared in TV series and films. He is the husband of the actress Abigail Thaw, whom he met while training at RADA.

== Early life ==
Whitmey was born in Peace River, Alberta, Canada. His family emigrated there from Liverpool, England, where his father had been employed as a medical officer of health. He came to London in the mid-1980s to study drama at RADA.

== Career ==
His television credits include Black Earth Rising, Doctor Who, Attila, Casualty, Waking the Dead and Agatha Christie's Poirot. He is also known for voicing numerous games, including the two Battlefield games of the Bad Company series, Crysis Warhead and Cyberpunk 2077.

== Personal life ==
At RADA, Whitmey met actress Abigail Thaw, whom he married in 1986. They have two children: Molly Mae, born 1997, and Talia, born 2003. He has worked chiefly in Britain in film, television, and voice overs.

== Filmography ==
=== Film ===
Year	Title	Role	Notes
1992	Shining Through	1st G.I. in canteen	
1995	Jefferson in Paris	John Trumbull	
1996	Surviving Picasso	Pierre	
1996	La lengua asesina	Chip	
1997	Twilight of the Ice Nymphs	Peter Glahn	Lead actor, had name removed from credits when his voice was overdubbed
1998	Girls' Night	Tyrone	
1998	Saving Private Ryan	Private Boyd	
1999	The Criminal		Voice
2001	The 51st State/Formula 51 (USA)	L.A. Highway Patrol	
2002	Muffin	Ed	
2003	Octane	Detective Ned Stephens	
2005	The Jacket	Lieutenant	
2006	Land of the Blind	Anchorman	
2007	The Three Investigators and the Secret of Skeleton Island	Al Crenshaw	
2012	Dark Shadows	Hard Hat #1	
2013	The Fifth Estate	General Thomason	
2015	Never Let Go	Clark Anderson	
2016	London Has Fallen	Prime Minister Robert Bowman (Canada)	

=== Television ===
Year	Title	Role	Notes
1990	Agatha Christie's Poirot	Luigi Valdarno	Episode: "The Adventure of the Cheap Flat"
1991	Josie		Episode: #1.6
1991	Streetwise	Louis Doyle	7 episodes
1991	The Lost Language of Cranes	Winston Penn	Television film
1992	Kissing the Gunner's Daughter	Jonathan Hogarth	2 parts
1993	Jeeves and Wooster	George	Episode: "Lady Florence Craye Arrives in New York"
1996	Over Here	Rayner	
1996	X	Yuto	Voice (English version)
2000	The 10th Kingdom	The SWAT Team	Mini TV series
2000	Too Much Sun	Jack	Episode: "Real Men Cry a Lot"
2001	Attila	Grachia	TV miniseries
2001	People Like Us		Episode: "The Actor"
2001	Where the Heart Is	Conrad Walker	Series 5, 4 episodes
2002	Shackleton	William Bakewell	2 episodes
2003	Helen of Troy	Odysseus	2 episodes
2004	Carrie's War	Major Cass Harper	Television film
2004	Mad About Alice	Vicar	Episode: "School Craze"
2004	Casualty	Dan Wilder	10 episodes during Series 18
2004	Keen Eddie	Anton Levy	Episode: "Liberté, Egalité, Fraternité"
2005	Broken News	Lawrence Frenzel	Episode: "Bolivian Crisis"
2005	Hustle	Chip Lacey	Episode: "Old Acquaintance"
2005	Doctor Who	Simmons	Episode: "Dalek"
2005	The Secretary Who Stole £4 Million	Ron Beller	Television film
2005	Murphy's Law	Atwell	Episode: "Strongbox"
2006	The Booze Cruise III	Ben	Television film
2007	Waking the Dead	Mervyn Simmel	Episodes: "The Fall: Part 1&2"
2008	Kingdom	Brad Johnson	Episode: #2.3
2009	Moonshot	Deke Slayton	Television film
2009	Midsomer Murders	Clinton Finn	Episode: "The Glitch"
2010	The Deep	Lowe	Episode: "All"
2012–present	Fireman Sam	Moose Roberts (voice)	Regular character
2013	Death of a Pilgrim	CIA Chef	2 episodes Television miniseries
2013	Jo	Viel	Episode: "Place Vendome"; Credited as Nigel Withmey
2014	The Assets	Callan Grayson	Episode: "Trip to Vienna"
2018	Death in Paradise	Bobby Rodrigues	Episode: #7.2
2018	Shakespeare & Hathaway: Private Investigators	Clive Brenton	Credited as Nigel Whitney; Episode: "O Brave New World"
2019	The Crown	Marquis Childs	Episode: #3.4
2023	The Way Home	Byron Groff	Recurring role (7 episodes)

=== Video games ===
Year	Game	Role	Notes
2006	Killzone: Liberation	Jan Templar	
2008	Haze		
2008	Battlefield: Bad Company	Haggard	
2008	Crysis Warhead	Marine	
2010	Battlefield: Bad Company 2	Haggard	
2012	Far Cry 3	Leonard	voice
2015	Soma	Matthey Frost / Richard Thabo	voices
2017	Need for Speed Payback		voices
2020	Cyberpunk 2077	Sergeant Dobs	voice
2021	The Ascent	Grateful Abbot / M-G Rep	voices
