= Salisbury Playhouse =

English theater and community facility

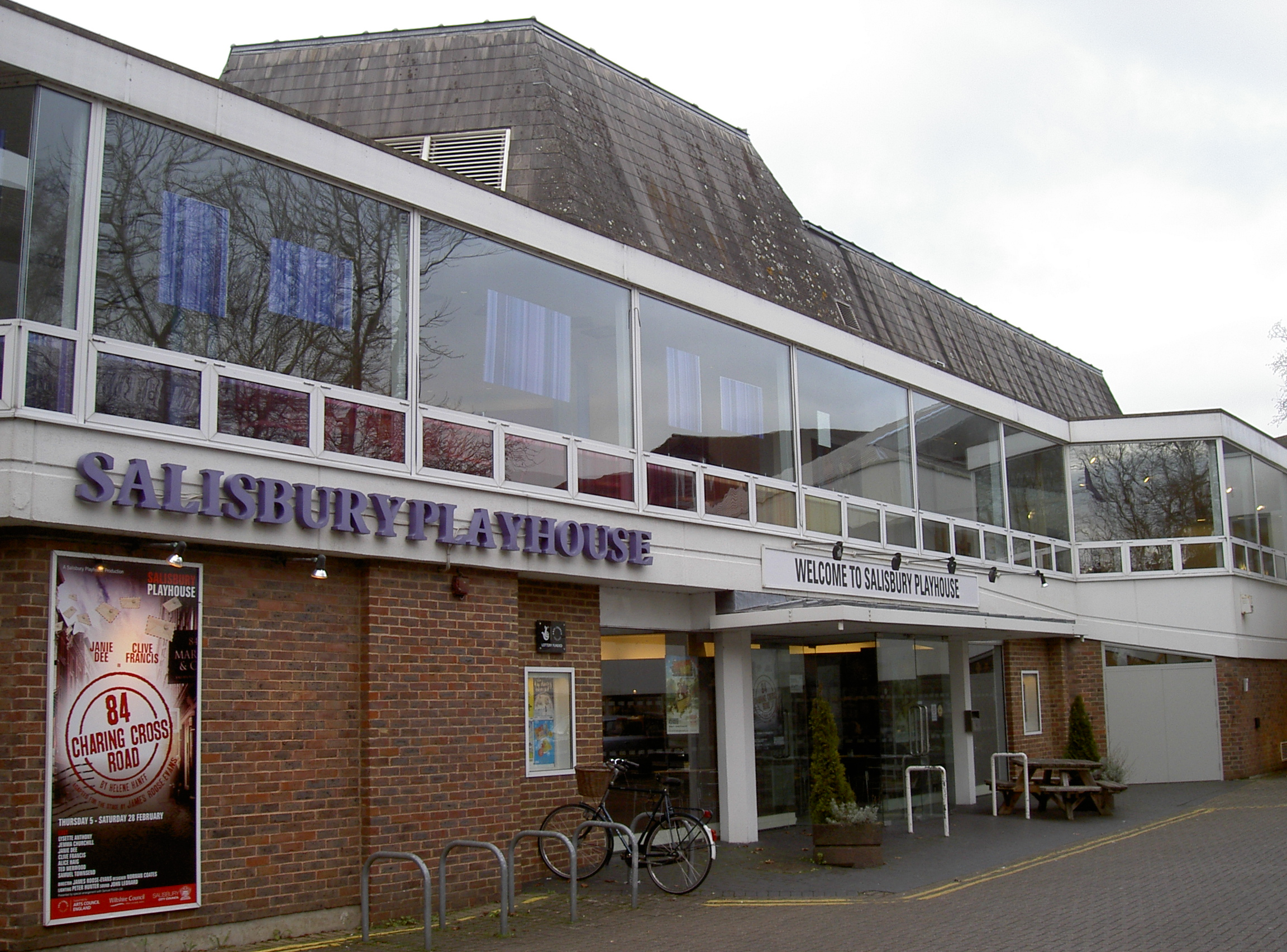
- Salisbury Playhouse
- Interactive map of Salisbury Playhouse
- Address: Salisbury, Wiltshire, England; Salisbury; United Kingdom
- Coordinates: 51.067°N 1.798°W
- Owner: Wiltshire Creative
- Operator: Wiltshire Creative
- Capacity: 517 (Main House); 149 (Salberg Studio)
- Type: Theatre

Construction
- Opened: 1976

Salisbury Playhouse is a theatre in the English city of Salisbury, Wiltshire. Built in 1976, it comprises the 517-seat Main House and the 149-seat Salberg Studio, a rehearsal room, a daytime café, and a community and education space. It is part of Arts Council England's National Portfolio of Organisations, and also receives regular funding from Wiltshire Council and Salisbury City Council.

== Overview ==
Plays in the Main House are often own or co-produced works, of which there are between eight and ten a year. The Playhouse also houses touring productions and a variety of events as part of the Salisbury International Arts Festival.

The Studio programme is the focus for the theatre's work for and with young people, which includes toured-in work, work from its Youth Theatre called Stage '65, and workshop productions.

The Playhouse's Tesco Community & Education Space and Rehearsal Room opened in July 2007.

In 2018, the charity which runs the theatre amalgamated with Salisbury Arts Centre and Salisbury International Arts Festival and was renamed Wiltshire Creative.

The artistic director is Gareth Machin, who was appointed in October 2011. Since 2024, the executive director is Rosa Corbishley.

== Productions ==
=== 2008 ===
- The Herbal Bed by Peter Whelan.
- People at Sea by J.B. Priestly.
- Taming the Tempest devised and directed by Mark Powell.
- Touched by Stephen Lowe.
- What the Butler Saw by Joe Orton.
- Oliver! A Stage ’65 Youth Theatre Production.
- Drowning on Dry Land by Alan Ayckbourn.
- A Taste of Honey by Shelagh Delaney.
- A Number by Caryl Churchill.
- A Month in the Country by J.L. Carr, adapted by Philip Wilson Premiere.
- Let's Face The Music and Dance a celebration of Irving Berlin.
- Dick Whittington and his Cat by Mark Clements.
- Our Country's Good by Timberlake Wertenbaker (Stage ’65 Youth Theatre).

=== 2009 ===
- Estelle Bright by Sarah Tullamore and Frederic Baptiste.
- The Winslow Boy by Terence Rattigan.
- The Real Thing by Tom Stoppard.
- Restoration by Rose Tremain, adapted by Matthew Francis. World premiere.
- Faith Healer by Brian Friel.
- The Importance of Being Earnest by Oscar Wilde.
- The Wizard of Oz A Stage ’65 Youth Theatre Production.
- The Lady in the Van by Alan Bennett.
- Blackbird by David Harrower.
- Romeo and Juliet: Unzipped, devised and directed by Mark Powell.
- After Miss Julie, a version of Strindberg's Miss Julie by Patrick Marber.
- Arsenic and Old Lace by Joseph Kesselring.
- Cinderella by Mark Clements, with original songs by Paul Herbert.
- The Way You Look Tonight, a celebration of Jerome Kern.

=== 2010 ===
- With a Song in My Heart a celebration of Rodgers and Hart.
- Aladdin by Mark Clements, with original songs by Paul Herbert.
- The Picture by Philip Massinger.
- Death and the Maiden by Ariel Dorfman.
- A Voyage Round My Father by John Mortimer.
- Peter Pan by J. M. Barrie.
- Les liaisons dangereuses by Christopher Hampton.
- Toro! Toro! by Michael Morpurgo, adapted by Simon Reade (world premiere).
- Low Pay? Don't Pay by Dario Fo, translated by Joseph Farrell.
- The Glass Menagerie by Tennessee Williams, co produced with Shared Experience.
- Private Lives by Noël Coward.
- The Little Mermaid and Other Tales, devised by Stage ’65 Youth Theatre, based on original stories by Hans Christian Andersen.

=== 2011 ===
- The Constant Wife by W. Somerset Maugham.
- The Game of Love and Chance by Pierre Marivaux, translated by Neil Bartlett.
- The Country by Martin Crimp.
- Guys and Dolls, a co-production with Clwyd Theatr Cymru and New Wolsey Theatre Ipswich.
- Around the World in 80 Days adapted by Phil Wilmott from the novel by Jules Verne (Stage '65 Youth Theatre).
- The Women of Troy by Euripides (Stage '65 Youth Theatre).
- Way Upstream by Alan Ayckbourn.
- Persuasion by Jane Austen (Adapted by Lucy Pitman-Wallace).
- Bang Bang Bang by Stella Feehily, a co-production with Out of Joint, Octagon Theatre, Bolton, and Curve Theatre Leicester.
- The Girl in the Yellow Dress, by Craig Higginson.
- Jack and the Beanstalk written by Mark Clements, (2011-2012).
- Let's Misbehave celebrating the songbook of Cole Porter, directed by Simon Green, (2011-2012).
- Romeo and Juliet: Unzipped, written and directed by Mark Powell.
- Good Night, Sleep Tight (Stage '65 Youth Theatre).

=== 2019 ===
- Toast by Nigel Slater, produced by Karl Sydow in partnership with PW Productions.
- The Night Watch by Original Theatre Company, written by Sarah Waters, adapted by Hattie Naylor.
- Robin Hood, adapted by Andrew Pollard and directed by Gareth Machin.
- The Tailor of Gloucester, by Beatrix Potter, directed by Jo Newman.

=== 2020 ===
- Mame (musical) by Jerome Lawrence and Robert E. Lee (playwright), directed by Nick Winston.
- Blood Wedding by Federico García Lorca, adapted by Barney Norris.
- Shirley Valentine by Willy Russell, directed by Ian Talbot.
- Dial M for Murder by Frederick Knott, directed by Anthony Banks.
- The Kite Runner by Khaled Hosseini, adapted by Matthew Spangler.
- Who's Afraid of Virginia Woolf? by Edward Albee, directed by David Mercatali, a co-production with Tobacco Factory Theatre.
- Hay Fever (play) by Noël Coward, directed by Gareth Machin.
- Little Robin Redbreast written and directed by Gareth Machin, (Annual Pantomime 2020-21).

=== 2021 ===
- September in the Rain written by John Godber, directed by Gareth Machin, a co-production with Tobacco Factory Theatre. This marked the first main house production since the COVID-19 pandemic in the United Kingdom began. It was available to watch live or stream online.
- The Lemon Table by Julian Barnes, directed by Michael Grandage and Titas Halder.
- The Hound of the Baskervilles by Arthur Conan Doyle, adapted by Steven Canny and John Nicholson.
- Snow White by Brothers Grimm, adapted and directed by Gareth Machin into the title "Snow White and the Happy Ever After Beauty Salon", (Annual Pantomime 2021-22).

=== 2022 ===
- A Murder Is Announced by Agatha Christie, directed by Michael Lunney.
- The Legend of Sleepy Hollow by Washington Irving, directed by Jake Smith.
- The Children (play) by Lucy Kirkwood, directed by Belinda Lang.
- Private Peaceful by Michael Morpurgo, adapted by Simon Reade.
- Sheila's Island by Tim Firth, a female led adaptation of his original drama Neville's Island (play).
- The Rise and Fall of Little Voice by Jim Cartwright, directed by Bronagh Lagan.
- When Darkness Falls by James Milton and Paul Morrissey.
- Spike by Ian Hislop and Nick Newman.
- The Wellspring by Barney Norris and David Owen Norris.
- Good Luck, Studio by Henry Shields, (World Premiere).
- Much Ado About Nothing by William Shakespeare, directed by Robert Hassie, a co-production with Ramps On The Moon and Sheffield Theatres.
- Cinderella adapted by Clare Plested, Adam Brown, and Amanda Wilsher, directed by Gareth Machin, (Annual Pantomime 2022-23).

=== 2023 ===
- How the Other Half Loves by Alan Ayckbourn, directed by Gareth Machin.
- Brief Encounter by Noël Coward, directed by Douglas Rintoul, a co-production with New Wolsey Theatre.
- The Tempest by William Shakespeare, directed by Gareth Machin. This was an outdoor production that took place within Churchill Gardens.
- Jeeves and Wooster in Perfect Nonsense by David and Robert Goodale, directed by Marieke Audsley, a co-production with Octagon Theatre Bolton
- The Girl on the Train (novel) adapted by Rachel Wagstaff and Duncan Abel, directed by Loveday Ingram.
- Dick Whittington and His Cat adapted by Clare Plested, Adam Brown, and Amanda Wilsher (who also wrote Cinderella at Salisbury in 2022-23). The production was directed by Gareth Machin, (Annual Pantomime 2023-24).

=== 2024 ===
- One Last Push by Chris Chibnall, directed by Gareth Machin.
- A Chorus of Disapproval (play) by Alan Ayckbourn, directed by Gareth Machin. This production marked the 35th Ayckbourn play at the venue.
- The Mousetrap by Agatha Christie, directed by Phillip Franks. This was part of a nationwide tour celebrating the play's 70th anniversary.
- Birdsong (novel) by Sebastian Faulks, directed by Alastair Whatley. This production celebrated the 30th anniversary of the original novels publication.
- Stones in His Pockets by Marie Jones, directed by Matthew McElhinney, the son of the original director Ian McElhinney.
- Play On! by Cheryl West, directed by Michael Buffong.
- Sleeping Beauty adapted by Clare Plested, Adam Brown, and Amanda Wilsher (who also wrote Cinderella and Dick Whittington at Salisbury in 2022-23 and 2023-24). The production was directed by Ryan McBryde, (Annual Pantomime 2024-25).

=== 2025 ===
- The Thirty-Nine Steps by John Buchan, adapted by Patrick Barlow, directed by Ryan McBryde. It was a co-production with Mercury Theatre, Colchester, and Octagon Theatre, Bolton.
- The Da Vinci Code by Dan Brown, adapted by Rachel Wagstaff and Duncan Abel (who had both previously written the stage adaptation for the Playhouse's The Girl on the Train). It was a co-production with Mercury Theatre, Colchester, directed by Chelsea Walker.
- The Jungle Book by Rudyard Kipling, adapted by Sonali Bhattacharyya, directed by Clare Threadgold. The show was a production by Stage 65 Youth Theatre, celebrating their 60th anniversary.
- Blithe Spirit by Noël Coward, directed by Anthony Banks. Co-production with Grand Theatre, Blackpool and Lee Dean.
- Don't Look Now by Daphne du Maurier, adapted by Nell Leyshon. Co-production with New Wolsey Theatre.
- Jack and the Beanstalk adapted by Clare Plested, Adam Brown, and Amanda Wilsher. The production was directed by Gareth Machin , (Annual Pantomime 2025-26).

=== 2026 ===
- Rock & Roll Man directed by Randal Myler, choreographed by Stephanie Klemons, and starring Constantine Maroulis. It was the UK Debut of the show, coming from a successful run on Broadway. It toured several UK theatres after.
- Romeo and Juliet directed by Gareth Machin. It was the second promenade Shakespeare adapation done by Wiltshire Creative.
- The Haunting of Hill House directed by Martin Constantine. It was a co-production in association with Theatr Clwyd, touring to several locations after.
- Up Down Big Man directed by Helena Seneca. This production marked the re-opening of the Salberg Studio, the first since COVID-19.
