= Sally Alexander =

English historian

Sally Alexander FRHistS
- Born: 1943 (age 82–83)
- Education: Ruskin College, Oxford; University College London
- Occupations: Historian; Feminist activist
- Employer: Goldsmiths, University of London
- Spouse: John Thaw (m. 1964; div. 1968)
- Children: Abigail Thaw

Sally A. Alexander FRHistS (born 1943) is an English historian and feminist activist.

== Career ==
When she was sixteen, Alexander trained at the Royal Academy of Dramatic Art as an actress. She completed a diploma in history at Ruskin College, Oxford from 1968 to 1970, before earning a Bachelor of Arts degree in the same subject from University College London. While studying, she worked on The Black Dwarf, a radical newspaper. She helped to organise the United Kingdom's first National Women's Liberation Conference in 1970 at Ruskin College, as an activist with the Women's Liberation Movement. She was also an organiser of the 1970 Miss World protest. She was involved in several London Women's Liberation Workshops as well as the Night Cleaners Campaign (1970–72).

Alexander was a founding editor of the History Workshop Journal, which was established in 1976, and was involved with Red Rag, a socialist feminist magazine. She taught in the extramural department of the University of London in the 1970s. She also taught history at the WEA and at Birkbeck College. She was a principal lecturer at the University of East London in history and cultural theory from 1992. She was also part of the advisory group for Virago Press. As of 2018, Alexander is Emeritus Professor of Modern History at Goldsmiths, University of London. Aside from feminist history, her academic interests include the history of other social movements, of memory, and of psychoanalysis in Britain.

== Personal life ==
In the summer of 1964, Alexander married actor John Thaw; they divorced four years later. She has a daughter from this marriage, actress Abigail Thaw.

== Activism and legacy ==
Alexander is portrayed by Keira Knightley in the 2020 British comedy-drama Misbehaviour about the 1970 Miss World competition that Alexander and other members of the Women's Liberation movement disrupted with flour bombs. Alexander’s granddaughter Molly Whitmey made a cameo in the Endeavour episode "Oracle" in February 2020 as the younger version of Alexander.

== Selected publications ==
- Becoming a Woman: And Other Essays in 19th and 20th Century Feminist History (London: Virago, 1994).
- (Co-edited with Barbara Taylor) History and Psyche: Culture, Psychoanalysis, and the Past (Basingstoke: Palgrave Macmillan, 2012).
