= Ladies in Lavender (play) =

Ladies in Lavender is a stage play in two acts by Shaun McKenna. It was adapted from Charles Dance’s screenplay for his 2004 film Ladies in Lavender, which was itself based on a 1908 short story by William J. Locke.

The play was commissioned by Daniel Schumann and produced by him together with Lee Dean in association with Charles Diamond and the Royal & Derngate, Northampton. The first performance was on 6 April 2012 at the Royal & Derngate. The play is published by Oberon Books.

== First Production ==
The original production was directed by Robin Lefevre and designed by Liz Ascroft, with sound by John Leonard and lighting by Mick Hughes. The music was by Nigel Hess, taken from the film soundtrack.

The original cast was led by Hayley Mills as Ursula, Belinda Lang as Janet, Carol MacReady as Dorcas and Robert Rees as Andrea. Robert Duncan played Dr Mead and Abigail Thaw was Olga.

The production toured the UK extensively.

== The Plot ==
Set in Cornwall in the mid-1930s, the play tells of two ageing spinster sisters, Ursula and Janet Widdington. Their lives are turned upside down when they discover a young man washed ashore on the beach, close to death. They nurse him back to health and discover he is a talented Polish violinist, on his way to seek a career in the USA. Despite her sister's concerns, Ursula falls in love with Andrea. It leads to a journey of discovery for her and a poignant ending.

== Awards and critical reception ==
Ladies in Lavender won five Broadway World UK Awards 2012, including Best Regional Play, Best Director (Robin Lefevre), Best Leading Actress (Hayley Mills), Best Featured Actress (Belinda Lang) and Best Featured Actor (Robert Rees). Throughout the tour the play received generally excellent reviews.

"Mills is stunning as Ursula, imbuing her with a girlish youth which makes her unrequited feelings ever poignant... As is Belinda Lang, who is equally touching as the abrupt Janet, her life also scarred by disappointment... It is perhaps because you spend so much time laughing that it makes its inevitable ending so poignant..." Northampton Chronicle and Echo. "Its tenderness and fragility are lovely to watch..." What'sOnStage.com "A thumping good brand new play in its own right... beautifully measured, touching and often very funny... If I had to choose just one play to watch again from this year's batch it would, without question, be my number one choice.” Bath Chronicle Theatre of such quality is a rare and precious thing..." LeftlLion.co.uk - Nottingham Culture A promotional video is available to view on YouTube.
