= Three Minute Moments =

- Release date: 2007
- Country: United Kingdom
- Language: English

Three Minute Moments is a 2007 British comedy feature film about speed dating. It was directed by Don Allen and written by Hari Patience. Three Minute Moments stars Katherine Heath, Giles Alderson, Philip Hayden, Naomi Martin and Belinda Lang who has an illustrious career in theatre and on television. The film follows three characters – Lucy, Emmett and Alicia – through their day and what inspires them to go speed dating. Because of the subject matter, there are more than 50 actors in the film. It highlights dates that you really wouldn't like to have.

== Cast and characters ==
=== Main characters ===
- Lucy - Katherine Heath
- Emmett - Philip Hayden
- Alicia - Naomi Martin
- Esther - Belinda Lang
- Joel - Giles Alderson

=== Other characters ===
- Bob - Dominic Fowler
- Maxie - Anita Clements
- Bianka - Dawn Salva
- Alan - Daniel Landau
- Johnny - James Fisher
- Layla - Gabrielle Amies
- Ishmael - Joey Jeetun
- Cathy - Kathryn Camsey
- Marcus - Paul Marcus Davis
- Peppar - Emma Jerrold
- Donna - Elle-Louise Berrie
- Kerri - Manolis Emmanouel
- Roxanne - Gillian MacGregor
- Dean - Rod Hunt
- Paul - Richard Fry
- Sunny - Elizabeth Cooper
- Trish - Kirsty Aarden
- Tom - Nathan Guy
- Daisy - Victoria Miller
- Maja - Ana Valencia
- Christian - Stephen Butterton
- Eleanor - Victoria Kruger
- Jason - Graeme Bunce
- Nathan - Nicholas Osmond
- Dave - Mark Plonsky
