= Stephen Bent =

English actor

Stephen Bent is an English actor who has appeared regularly on British television since 1970 in varied roles, including on 5 soaps, Crossroads, Coronation Street, EastEnders, Hollyoaks and Emmerdale. In 1989, he played the role of Jackson in the television production Agatha Christie's Miss Marple: A Caribbean Mystery. He has also acted in theatre.

He appeared initially as a well-known face on British TV for his role as Gerry Hurst in the ATV tea-time soap opera Crossroads. Then as a recurring character in Hollyoaks as Don Trent. In 2013 he appeared as Micky Saunders in Truckers.

== Filmography ==
Year	Title	Role	Notes
1977 - 1979	Crossroads	Gerry Hurst	
1980	McVicar	Warder	
1982	Friend or Foe	Corporal	
1982	Who Dares Wins	Neil	
1995	The Gnomes' Great Adventure	Holler / Pat	Voice
1998	The Sea Change	Mario	
2001	Millennium Actress	Junichi Otaki	English version, Voice
2001	Mean Machine	Referee	
2002	Ali G Indahouse	John - Nike Leisure Centre Manager	
2002	Before You Go	Male Official	
2003	Cheeky	Albert Sharples	
2010	The Orgasm Diaries	Noon's Dad	
2012	City Slacker	John	
2012	Les Misérables	Jailer	
2015	Molly Moon and the Incredible Book of Hypnotism	Bus driver	
2021	Doctors	Jeff Sewell	Episode: "Game On"
2023	Doctors	Colin Shaw	Episode: "Furryland"
