= Monsieur chasse! =

1892 play

Contemporary sketches of the premiere

Monsieur chasse! (Monsieur is hunting!) is a three-act farce by Georges Feydeau, first produced in Paris in 1892. A married man disguises his absences conducting an extramarital affair in Paris as shooting trips in the country, but an evening's chaotic events expose his deception.

The play was Feydeau's first success since his first full-length play, Tailleur pour dames, six years earlier. It ran for 144 performances and has been revived frequently in the 20th and 21st centuries.

== Background and first production ==
In 1886 the 24-year-old Feydeau had a great success with his first full length play, Tailleur pour dames (Ladies' Tailor), but his next five plays had been failures or very modest successes. After a period of studying the works of the earlier comic masters of the 19th century he wrote two new plays in 1892: Monsieur chasse! and Champignol malgré lui (Champignon despite himself) – the latter in collaboration with Maurice Desvallières. The management of the Théâtre du Palais-Royal accepted Monsieur chasse! for production, and it was first presented on 23 April 1892, running for 144 performances, at a time when a run of more than 100 performances was rated as a success for a Parisian theatre.

=== Original cast ===
- Duchotel – Saint-Germain
- Moricet – Perrée Raimond
- Cassagne – R. Luguet
- Bridois, Commisaire de police – H. Deschamps
- Gontran – Marcel Simon
- Féru – M. Ferdinand
- Agent – M. Greffier
- Leontine – Berthe Cerny
- Madame Latour – Mme Franck-Mel
- Babet – Mlle A. Renaud

Source: Les Annales du théâtre et de la musique.

== Plot ==
=== Act 1 ===
The scene is the Duchotels' flat in Paris. Duchotel is frequently absent on the pretext of shooting on the country estate of his friend Cassagne. He is, in fact, carrying on an extramarital affair in Paris with Cassagne's wife. Duchotel's wife, Léontine, has an admirer, Dr Moricet, but she refuses to give way to him as long as her husband is faithful to her. Duchotel's young nephew Gontran enters, succeeds in extracting 500 francs from his uncle, and leaves. Duchotel departs, with his guns and luggage, and Moricet hints to Léontine that there may be an ulterior motive for her husband's regular absences.

Cassagne arrives. He is separated from his wife, and has come to Paris to consult Duchotel about obtaining a divorce. He knows that her most ardent adorer is an individual called Zizi, and has taken steps for catching them together in flagrante at the Paris apartment in which they meet. It emerges that Cassagne has not seen Duchotel for six months, and that the latter has never shot over the Cassagne estate. Léontine sees that her husband is deceiving her, and on the spur of the moment she tells Moricet that she will be his the same evening.

=== Act 2 ===
The scene is an apartment block at 40 rue d'Athènes. As the venue for his rendezvous with Léontine, Moricet has rented furnished rooms previously occupied by a glamorous cocotte, Urbaine des Voitures, who has just been expelled by the concierge, Madame Latour du Nord. The latter is indulgent to extramarital escapades in her rooms, but cannot abide mercenary love. The concierge is unaware that Urbaine has given a key to the apartment to her admirer Gontran. Off the same corridor is another flat, occupied by Madame Cassagne, whose "uncle Zizi" – Duchotel – comes to see her once a month. He has already arrived there when Moricet conducts Léontine through the opposite door. Their conversation is interrupted by the concierge, who hints that a husband "going shooting" is really setting a trap for his unfaithful wife. This frightens Léontine, and her thoughts of revenge vanish, and the putative lovers quarrel so seriously that they decide to spend the night apart, Léontine on a sofa in the next room, while Moricet occupies the bed.

The concierge returns: the woman in the opposite room has had an attack of nerves and perhaps Dr Moricet could treat her. He refuses, and Duchotel himself comes to beg him to help, and is astonished to see his friend. Léontine appears, and on seeing her husband hides her face with a blanket; Duchotel does not recognise her, and takes himself off without suspecting anything. Léontine retires to the other room and Moricet goes to bed again.

The door opens gently, and Gontran makes his way to the bed, where he supposes his darling Urbaine is sleeping. He kisses and hugs Moricet, who, after returning this embrace with a box on the ear, jumps out of bed calling for help. Gontran hides in the wardrobe, while Moricet – in his drawers – and Léontine, who has come to his rescue, search for the intruder, but in vain. Then Moricet goes to bed again and Léontine returns to her sofa, but they are again disturbed by Duchotel, who, trapped in Mme Cassagne's apartment by the arrival of the police commissary, has escaped from it – also in his drawers – via the balcony and into Moricet's room. Hastily donning a pair of trousers placed on a chair, he rushes to the door and downstairs, while the pursuing policemen, on discovering Moricet trouserless, arrest and haul him off.

=== Act 3 ===
The action returns to the Duchotel residence, the following morning. Leontine is exasperated with Moricet for failing to keep his trousers, for in one pocket was her letter to him asking him to avenge her. Now her husband is in possession of both trousers and letter. Duchotel arrives from his supposed shooting trip, and when Leontine tells him that Cassagne denies all knowledge of such shooting on his estate, Duchotel insists that Cassagne had sunstroke which badly affects his memory. Cassagne himself enters, confusing matters still further. He is delighted to have caught his wife with her lover and asks Duchotel if he knows this man Moricet. Duchotel says no, at which point Moricet enters. Duchotel tries to pass him off as his shirt-maker. Gontran's arrival throws everyone into confusion, for he has seen them all at 40 rue d'Athènes. They each bribe him to silence. Duchotel finds the love-letter in his trouser pocket but takes it to be an old letter from Leontine written at the time of their engagement, and he asks her to forgive him in memory of that happy time. She refuses, until Gontran quietly suggests she should forgive her husband in memory of the lady he saw at 40 rue d'Athènes the night before. She takes the point and complies, Duchotel promises never to go hunting again, and Moricet gets his trousers back.

Source: The Era.

== Reception ==
In Le Figaro, Henry Fouquier wrote:

Yesterday evening was an evening of laughter and the audience delightedly welcomed a work conceived in joy, nimble and brisk, by an author who enjoys his own imaginings. The play is quite complicated and, for the most part, belongs to the theatre of imbroglio and remains faithful to the tradition of the Palais-Royal, which does not shrink from a little excess in comic situations. But it is clear, of a constant good humour which is irresistible, and the spirit of vaudeville joins a spirit of fine comedy and a very special fantasy.

Les Annales du théâtre et de la musique said:

At last the Palais-Royal has a success, a real success, undisputed and deserved. Yes, deserved, for these three acts by the young author of Tailleur pour dames show great progress since that pleasing start – so constant a good mood, such frank and natural cheerfulness of dialogue, such an abundance of good lines, so much fertility, fantasy and ingenuity in the comedy, and such unexpected madness carried the audience away with laughter and caused cheers from the spectators.

== Revivals and adaptations ==
Feydeau's plays went through a period of neglect after his death in 1921, and it was not until the 1940s that interest in them was rekindled. Monsieur chasse was one of the first to be revived, in a production in 1944 by Jean Darcante at Le Palace, Paris, with Pierre Larquey and Simone Renant as the Duchotels. In the rest of the 20th century there were nine further major revivals in Paris and other French cities, and there were ten in the first two decades of the 21st. Directors have included Darcante; Robert Dhéry; the author's grandson Alain Feydeau; Denise Filiatrault; Basil Langton; Yves Pignot and Georges Vitaly.

=== Adaptations ===
An early English adaptation, The Sportsman, by William Lestocq was heavily edited to meet the requirements of Victorian theatregoers in London. The protagonist's motives for playing truant were changed from adultery to gambling. The piece opened in London in January 1893, starring Charles Hawtrey and Lottie Venne. English-language adaptations broadly representative of Feydeau's original did not appear until the 1960s. Prospect Theatre Company presented a version by Richard Cottrell called The Bird Watcher in 1964.

Under the title 13 rue de l'amour the piece played in London in 1976 and New York in 1978, starring Louis Jourdan in both productions. Two other versions from the 1970s are The Happy Hunter (1972), and A-hunting We will Go (1976). Gone Hunting! was published in 1995 and The One that Got Away in 2002. A 2017 play Bang Bang! was based on Monsieur chasse!.

== References and sources ==
=== Sources ===
- Noël, Edouard; Edmond Stoullig (1893). Les Annales du théâtre et de la musique, 1892. Paris: Charpentier. OCLC 172996346.
- Pronko, Leonard (1975). Georges Feydeau. New York: Ungar. ISBN 978-0-8044-2700-5.
