= Friend or Foe (film) =

- Directed by: John Krish
- Screenplay by: John Krish
- Based on: Friend or Foe by Michael Morpurgo
- Produced by: Gordon Scott
- Starring: John Bardon; Stacey Tendeter; John Holmes
- Cinematography: Ray Orton
- Music by: Robert Farnon
- Production company: Children's Film Foundation
- Distributed by: Children's Film Foundation (theatrical); Rank Video Library
- Release date: April 1982
- Running time: 70 minutes
- Country: United Kingdom
- Language: English
- Budget: £116,500

Friend or Foe is a 1982 British independent film that was written and directed by John Krish and produced by Gordon Scott for the Children's Film Foundation. The film, which was given a theatrical release in April 1982, is based on the 1977 children's novel by the same name by Michael Morpurgo. It stars John Bardon, Stacy Tendeter, and John Holmes and concerns two young boys who are evacuated from London during World War II. The source novel was inspired by the evacuations of civilians in Britain during World War II.

Friend or Foe was later shown as part of a theatrical retrospective of Krish's work in 2013 and was also screened at the Melbourne International Film Festival in 2014.

== Plot ==
During the Second World War, two young boys, played by John Holmes and Mark Luxford, are evacuated from London to the countryside by train. Arriving in an unfamiliar village, they are taken in by a kindly dairy farmer, and soon become familiar with country life. Between lending a hand on the farm and attending the one-classroom village school, they spend their days exploring the fields and woods of the area, and thoroughly enjoying themselves. Then one night, there is a bombing raid near the village and the boys witness a German bomber come down. They try to tell the locals, but a search finds no evidence of a downed plane, and the boys are in trouble for wasting the police and the armed services’ time (the plane had actually come down in a pond and sunk out of sight).

The boys encounter two German airmen hiding in the woods who are the only ones to have survived the crash. One of them saves one of the boys from drowning in the pond. The airmen both speak English and let the boys go, but ask them not to tell. The boys have a crisis of conscience as a result, but eventually decide to protect the Germans. When one of the airmen injures himself, he lets the boys 'capture' him, as he needs medical attention. The boys then become local heroes. The second German is later captured. The boys' foster family realise what happened, but are understanding of the situation.

== Cast ==
- John Bardon as Jerry
- Stacey Tendeter as Anne
- John Holmes as David
- Mark Luxford as Tucky
- Jennifer Piercey as Miss Evans
- Valerie Lush as Miss Roberts
- Edward Burnham as Mr. Cooper
- Jasper Jacob as German Pilot
- Robin Hayter as Injured German
- Philip Mankium as Captain
- Prentis Hancock as Sargeant
- Ann Mitchell as Mrs. Hardy
- Len Marten as Seedy Reporter
- David Cunningham as Despatch Rider
- Stephen Bent as Corporal

== Reception ==
Critical reception for Friend or Foe was positive. Variety rated the film favorably, writing "It's more evidence that the Children's Film Foundation is presently moving toward front position in this difficult genre on the world scene."

Sight and Sound reported the film Has done very well and will soon be in profit."
