= Edward Burnham =

English actor (1916–2015)

- Born: 25 December 1916; Stafford, Staffordshire, England
- Died: 30 June 2015 (aged 98); Chelwood Gate, West Sussex, England
- Education: RADA
- Occupation: Actor
- Years active: 1938–2003

Edward Burnham (25 December 1916 – 30 June 2015) was an English actor whose career spanned over 60 years.

== Early years ==
Burnham was born in Stafford, England on Christmas Day 1916. He was educated at The Latymer School in London. After studying history for a year at the University of London, he trained at RADA and briefly at the Comédie-Française in Paris, then worked on stage in regional repertory theatre, at the Liverpool Playhouse and The Old Vic, and in London's West End. He was a conscientious objector during the Second World War.

== Career ==
Burnham is best known for the films To Sir, with Love (1967), The Abominable Dr. Phibes (1971) and 10 Rillington Place (1971), and for twice appearing in Doctor Who in The Invasion (1968) and Robot (1974/5). His other television roles include Z-Cars, The Saint, The Avengers, The Troubleshooters, Special Branch, Crown Court, Thriller, Rumpole of the Bailey, Crossroads, Tales of the Unexpected, The Gentle Touch, All Creatures Great and Small, The Bill, Swiss Toni and Black Books. His other films have included When Eight Bells Toll (1971), Young Winston (1972), The Hiding Place (1974), Coming Out of the Ice (1982), Little Dorrit (1987) and Diamond Skulls (1989).

As well as his acting career, Burnham also returned to RADA to teach. His students included Peter O’Toole, Sian Phillips, Albert Finney, Anne Reid and Alan Bates.

== Death ==
Burnham died aged 98, on 30 June 2015 at his home in England.

== Filmography ==
Year	Title	Role	Notes
1967	To Sir, with Love	Florian	
1971	10 Rillington Place	Medical Board #2	
1971	When Eight Bells Toll	Macullum	
1971	The Abominable Dr. Phibes	Dr. Dunwoody	
1972	Young Winston	Henry Labouchere	
1975	The Hiding Place	Underground Leader	
1976	The Copter Kids	Mr. Owen	Children's Film Foundation
1982	Friend or Foe	Mr. Cooper	
1984	Memed, My Hawk	Naked Man	
1987	Little Dorrit	Daniel Doyce	
1989	Diamond Skulls	John the Gardener	
