= The Bretts =

British drama television series (1987–1988)

- Genre: Drama
- Created by: Frank Marshall; Rosemary Anne Sisson
- Written by: Rosemary Anne Sisson
- Starring: Norman Rodway; Barbara Murray; Belinda Lang; David Yelland; George Winter; Sally Cookson; Frank Middlemass
- Theme music composer: David Cullen; David McKay
- Country of origin: United Kingdom
- Original language: English
- No. of series: 2
- No. of episodes: 19

Production
- Executive producers: Ted Childs (Series 1); Frank Marshall; Colin Callender; William Smethurst (Series 2)
- Producer: Tony Charles
- Running time: 51 minutes
- Production company: Central Independent Television

Original release
- Network: ITV
- Release: 16 October 1987 – 28 August 1988

The Bretts is a British period drama television series produced by Central Independent Television. It originally aired for 2 series consisting of 19 episodes between 16 October 1987 and 28 August 1988 on ITV in the United Kingdom and on Masterpiece Theatre in the United States.

It follows the fortunes and dramatic private lives of The Bretts, a legendary theatrical dynasty, headed by Actor-manager Charles Brett (Norman Rodway) and his wife Lydia Brett (Barbara Murray). They have been the reigning luminaries of the West End stage since the 1890s, and their fiercely competitive nature has now been passed down to the next generation of Bretts: Edwin, Martha and Thomas. The series is set in London, England, against the backdrop of the British theatre and interwar society during the late 1920s and into the 1930s. The series deals with the advent of ‘talking pictures’ and the radical plays that began to be written by the likes of people like Noël Coward.

Dubbed “Upstage, Downstage” by critics, due to Sissons being a writer on the popular period drama Upstairs, Downstairs, the second series was produced in association with the WGBH television station in Boston, USA, the Central Television series allegedly cost £15 million and was the channels most expensive drama up to that point. The series were funded with a grant from The Mobil Corporation and was promoted in the US under the Mobil Masterpiece Theater banner.

The series was known for its high production values for the time, from costumes to props, as well as many of the episodes consisting of multiple elaborate sets, some of which were only used once. The Princess Theatre which features prominently in the series was filmed at the Buxton Opera House.

The series was created by Frank Marshall and Rosemary Anne Sisson.. Sissons wrote a book based on the series which was published by Penguin Books in 1987.

The Wall Street Journal called it “The fine high style of Masterpiece Theatre at its frothiest” and The Houston Chronicle referred to it as a “Delightfully dizzy clan of Brits”.

== Main cast ==
- Norman Rodway as Charles Brett
- Barbara Murray as Lydia Brett
- Belinda Lang as Martha Brett
- David Yelland as Edwin Brett
- George Winter as Thomas "Tom" Brett
- Sally Cookson / Natalia Thompson as Perdita Brett
- Frank Middlemass as George Brett
- Helena McCarthy as Maeve Brett
- Tim Wylton as Alfred Sutton (The Bretts Butler)
- Billy Boyle as Patrick Hegarty (The Bretts Chauffeur)
- Rhoda Lewis as Flora Evans (The Bretts Cook) (Series 1)
- Janet Maw as Jean Lacy (Series 1)
- Hugh Fraser as Oliver Mortimer, KC (Series 2)

It was whilst filming Series 2 that Belinda Lang first met, and acted opposite, her future husband, Hugh Fraser.

== Episodes ==
=== Series overview ===
Series	Episodes	Originally released	
Series	Episodes	First released	Last released
1	13	16 October 1987	27 December 1987
2	6	24 July 1988	28 August 1988

=== Series 1 (1987) ===
No. overall	No. in series	Title	Directed by	Written by	Original release date
1	1	"The King Shall Not Die"	Ronald Wilson	Rosemary Anne Sisson and Herb Schmerz	16 October 1987
To cope with mounting debts and chaotic correspondence, Charles employs a glamorous society woman as his secretary. Meanwhile, Lydia takes on a theatrical role that pointedly excludes him. When she discovers his new hire, she storms out and threatens divorce. Struggling to land worthwhile parts, Charles produces a play others deem mediocre. Lydia’s production becomes a triumph, while his flops financially—until an unexpected guest changes its fate.
2	2	"Driving Ambition"	Ronald Wilson	Laurence Marks and Maurice Gran	18 October 1987
The Bretts buy a motorcar. Thomas is elated when Jean praises his play, though Sutton believes she is overstepping her bounds. Charles sets his sights on acquiring the Princess Theatre so his son can inherit the lead in The King Must Not Die.
3	3	"Vagabonds and Thieves"	David Reynolds	Bill Craig	23 October 1987
With Thomas’ play proving successful, Brewster insists his next work debut at the Princess, while Charles pressures him to rewrite it with a starring role for himself. Thomas soon makes a startling discovery.
4	4	"Full House"	David Reynolds	Julia Jones	30 October 1987
After an illness, Charles’ parents—George and his wife—move in. Thomas leaves home for the theatre. The new manager, Piers, uncovers costly structural issues and begins an affair with Martha, arousing George’s suspicions.
5	5	"Moving Pictures"	Ronald Wilson	Rosemary Anne Sisson	6 November 1987
Charles, Lydia, and Martha collaborate on a new play. Flora shocks the family by revealing she has seen Edwin in a film, prompting uproar until Laszlo offers Charles a screen test. Forced to watch himself onscreen, Charles tactfully refuses the opportunity. Laszlo then offers Sutton a position as his assistant, leaving him tempted.
6	6	"Broadway, Here I Come"	Ronald Wilson	Alan Clews	13 November 1987
An American songwriter arrives, and Charles bristles at Gerard’s attention toward Lydia—though Gerard is truly pursuing Martha. Lydia turns to Charles for help with a staggering tax bill and considers returning to Broadway.
7	7	"Revenge Is Sweet"	David Reynolds	Stanley Price	20 November 1987
Stung by a scathing review of their latest play, Edwin retaliates by dumping a drink over the critic at his club. Lydia returns from New York, but Charles grows jealous of her Broadway leading man. As gossip columns continue to needle the Bretts, Charles receives crucial information from an unlikely source.
8	8	"Get Me to the Church on Time"	David Reynolds	Alan Clews	27 November 1987
Edwin falls hard for Martha’s friend Diana. Sutton invites his companion Polly for tea but is disheartened when their relationship stalls. Gerard urges Martha to join him in America, yet she refuses to sacrifice her career.
9	9	"The Actress and the Bishop"	Ronald Wilson	Fred Kelsall	4 December 1987
When Martha’s injury forces the closure of Scram!, a mysterious clergyman pens a sensational play for her. Charles and Lydia accidentally see a copy and secretly claim it. Jean resigns without warning. A Bolshevik union organizer seizes the moment to sue the Bretts. Though Martha tries to support Jean, Jean insists on independence.
10	10	"Forbidden Fruit: Part One"	Bill Hays	Laurence Marks and Maurice Gran	11 December 1987
The focus shifts to the tangled love lives of the three younger Brett siblings.
11	11	"Forbidden Fruit: Part Two"	John Bruce	Bill Craig	11 December 1987
Grieving Gerard’s death, Martha spirals into cocaine use until Tatyana helps her confront old wounds and find forgiveness. Meanwhile, Edwin’s romantic missteps cost him his film role.
12	12	"All Right on the Night"	John Bruce	Bill Craig	18 December 1987
As the entire family prepares a charity performance, Charles hires yet another secretary. Rumors swirl among staff that he is unfaithful to Lydia, while relatives suspect Lydia of betraying him.
13	13	"Grand Finale"	John Bruce	Rosemary Anne Sisson	27 December 1987
After a fire ravages the Princess Theatre, the Bretts mount a Christmas pantomime of Cinderella in a desperate bid to avoid financial collapse.

=== Series 2 (1988) ===
No. overall	No. in series	Title	Directed by	Written by	Original release date
14	1	"Home and Away: Part One"	Baz Taylor	Stanley Price	24 July 1988
Advised to take a break, Charles travels with his family to Edwin’s villa in the south of France. After they depart, Perdita secretly returns home so she can continue seeing her boyfriend.
15	2	"Home and Away: Part Two"	Baz Taylor	Stanley Price	31 July 1988
A sudden heart attack leaves Charles shaken, draws media attention, and prompts him to reconsider an offer from the Princess Theatre. Meanwhile, Hegarty’s nephew, Fergus Ryan, arrives and quickly charms Emily. Silverstein suspends Edwin for the remainder of his three-year film contract. The family’s new cook, Mrs. Dean, proves a welcome change after the dreary vegetarian fare served by the late, unlamented Gladys.
16	3	"A House Divided"	Graeme Harper	Bill Craig	7 August 1988
Hegarty soon learns that Fergus is fleeing dangerous Irish criminals. Charles refuses to rely on Equity contracts and threatens legal action instead. When Eduardo assaults Martha, Oliver Mortimer warns her that pursuing the case would damage her reputation, then unexpectedly asks her out.
17	4	"The Luck of the Irish"	Graeme Harper	Harry Duffin	14 August 1988
While researching hospitals for a play, Thomas encounters a spirited medical student. Fergus remains haunted by the fear that the killer he witnessed will track him down. Oliver urges Martha to campaign alongside him, and Thomas’s new love interest, Meg, turns out to be the sister of Oliver’s political rival. Lydia persuades Charles to play Romeo opposite her in a radio production.
18	5	"I’ve Got You Under My Skin"	John Woods	Alan Clews	21 August 1988
The staff continue to mourn Hegarty’s death, with Sutton burdened by guilt. Both Charles’s and Lydia’s touring companies struggle as audiences flock to “talkies,” though Charles insists that strong performances will still draw crowds. Oliver persists in courting Martha. Edwin’s suggestion to convert some theatres into cinemas sparks Charles’s anger. Claudia attempts to ease Sutton’s self-blame. Guy Benson expresses interest in screen-testing Perdita, despite her desire for a stage career, and Charles and Lydia question his intentions.
19	6	"The Golden Dustman"	John Woods	Richard LeParmentier and Paddy Fletcher	28 August 1988
Edwin and Diana carry on their affair, but Diana grows increasingly jealous as Edwin spends more time filming and dining with his leading lady. Oliver proposes to Martha. Edwin and Charles strike a deal to appear in Douglas Barron’s film adaptation of Our Mutual Friend in exchange for distribution rights for their cinema chain. At the same time, Lydia takes the lead in Strike Up the Band.

== Home media ==
The complete series was released on DVD as a box set by Acorn Media in the United States on 26 July 2011. And it remains not yet to be released in the United Kingdom.
