= Mercury Theatre, Colchester =

Theatre in Colchester, England

Mercury Theatre Colchester
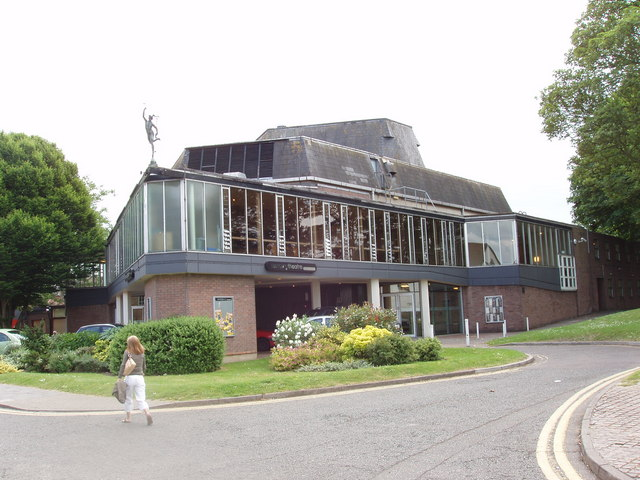
- The Mercury Theatre from the Roman Wall (2006)

- Location within Colchester
- Address: Balkerne Gate; Colchester, Essex; England
- Coordinates: 51.8894°N 0.8944°E
- Capacity: Main Theatre 499; Studio Theatre 99
- Production: List: The Weir; Peter Pan; The Events; Spamalot; Bang Bang; Aladdin; Sweeney Todd: The Demon Barber of Fleet Street; Much Ado About Nothing; Wind in the Willows; Private Lives; Clybourne Park; End of the Rainbow; Bully Boy; Little Shop of Horrors; Avenue Q; Educating Rita; Cinderella; You Can Always Hand Them Back; The Good Person of Sichuan; Man To Man; James and the Giant Peach; The Hired Man; The Butterfly Lion; The Opinion Makers

Construction
- Opened: 1972
- Architect: Norman Downie

Website
- Mercury Theatre

The Mercury Theatre is a theatre in Colchester, producing highly regarded original work under the title "Mercury Originals" and also receiving touring shows. The theatre has two auditoria, and is led by Steve Mannix (Executive Director & CEO). The theatre formerly contained The Digby Gallery, which showcased local art.

== History ==
In 1968, the Colchester New Theatre Trust was formed to identify a site for a new theatre and to oversee its constructions. The Mercury Theatre, designed by Norman Downie, was opened on 10 May 1972, after a successful fund-raising campaign, supported by a large grant from the Borough Council. It originated with the Colchester Repertory Company, formed in 1937.

The theatre was initially structurally identical to the Salisbury Playhouse, though the Playhouse was later extended.

David Buxton, the first Artistic Director, was succeeded by Michael Winter in 1984. After David Forder's retirement as Administrative Director in late 1990, Michael became Artistic Director and Chief Executive. In May 1994, Pat Trueman succeeded him in the joint role, until 1998. Adrian Stokes joined as Associate Director in 1995 and initiated the Community Education Programme.

In 1998 Dee Evans arrived as Chief Executive and Gregory Floy as Artistic Producer. Together, in 1999, they formed the Mercury Theatre Company with Gregory as Artistic Director. In 2012 the Company was superseded by Made in Colchester, introduced by newly appointed Artistic Director Daniel Buckroyd and Executive Director Theresa Veith. In 2019 a revamped leadership structure was announced with Tracey Childs (Executive Producer) and Steve Mannix (Executive Director) appointed as Joint Chief Executives and Ryan McBryde appointed as Creative Director. In January 2025, Natasha Rickman was appointed as Artistic Director, joining Steve Mannix (CEO) and Deborah Sawyerr (Deputy Executive Director) in the Leadership team.

== Featured artists ==
Productions at the Mercury have included the work of John Cleese, Martin Clunes, Gwen Taylor, Simon Gray, Toby Longworth, Ingrid Lacey, Michael Grandage, Mike Poulton, Michael Deacon, Colin McCormack, David Oakes, Donald Freed

Michael Grandage made his directorial debut at the Mercury with "The Last Yankee", and Trevor Howard began his career at the Colchester Repertory Company.

Gari Jones, formerly of the National Theatre, has regularly piloted new work at the Mercury Theatre.

== 2018 Made in Colchester productions ==
- Jack and the Beanstalk
- Silence by Nicola Werenowska (co-production with Wiltshire Creative and Unity Theatre, Liverpool)
- Moll Flanders by Nick Perry (An unfaithful adaptation based on the novel by Daniel Defoe)
- Babe, The Sheep-Pig by David Wood, based on the book by Dick King-Smith
- Europe After the Rain by Oliver Bennett
- Pieces of String by Gus Gowland (co-production with TBO Productions)
- Turn of the Screw by Henry James adapted by Tim Luscombe (co-production with Dermot McLaughlin Productions and Wolverhampton Grand Theatre)

== 2017 Made in Colchester productions ==
- Snow White and the Seven Dwarfs
- The Weir (co-production with English Touring Theatre) by Conor McPherson
- Peter Pan
- Farm Boy by Michael Morpurgo
- The Events by David Greig
- Spamalot
- Bang Bang (co-production with John Cleese) based on Georges Feydeau's Monsieur chasse !

== 2016 Made in Colchester productions ==
- Dick Whittington
- Sweeney Todd: The Demon Barber of Fleet Street (co-production with Derby Theatre)
- Much Ado About Nothing by William Shakespeare
- Wind in the Willows by Kenneth Grahame
- Private Lives by Noël Coward
- End of the Rainbow (co-production with Paul Taylor-Mills) starring Lisa Maxwell as Judy Garland

== 2015 Made in Colchester productions ==
- Aladdin
- Bully Boy by Sandi Toksvig
- James and the Giant Peach
- Little Shop of Horrors
- Noises Off
- Animal Farm
- The Smallest Show on Earth (Co-Production with Brian Eastman and Christabel Albery)
- Educating Rita by Willy Russell

== 2014 Made in Colchester productions ==
- Dial M for Murder by Frederick Knott
- Betty Blue Eyes by Alan Bennett, Malcolm Mowbray, Daniel Lipman and Ron Cowen
- Saturday Night and Sunday Morning by Alan Sillitoe
- You Can Always Hand Them Back by Roger Hall and Peter Skellern
- The Wall by Roger Waters
- Friend or Foe by Michael Morpurgo
- Macbeth by William Shakespeare
- Dracula by Fitzrovia Radio Hour

== 2013 Made in Colchester productions ==
- Garage Band by Andy Barrett
- The Hired Man by Melvyn Bragg and Howard Goodall
- Intimate Exchanges by Alan Ayckbourn
- The History Boys by Alan Bennett
- Quadrophenia by Kenneth Emson
- The Butterfly Lion by Michael Morpurgo
- The Good Person of Sichuan by Bertolt Brecht
- Man to Man by Manfred Karge
- The Opinion Makers by Brian Mitchell and Joseph Nixon
- Sleeping Beauty by Jonathan Petherbridge
