= Belinda Lang =

British actress (born 1953)

- Born: Belinda Lucy Lange; 23 December 1953 (age 72); Marylebone, London, England
- Occupation: Actress
- Years active: 1980–present
- Spouse: Hugh Fraser (m. 1988)
- Children: 1
- Relatives: Jeremy Hawk (father); Joan Heal (mother)

Belinda Lucy Lang Fraser (born 23 December 1953), known professionally as Belinda Lang, is an English actress. She starred as Kate in the BBC sitcom Dear John, Liza in the ITV sitcom Second Thoughts (1991–94), and Bill Porter in the BBC sitcom 2point4 Children (1991–99). Her theatre credits include London productions of the Noël Coward plays Present Laughter (1981), Blithe Spirit (1997), and Hay Fever (2006). Her radio/audio credits include voicing narrator Madeleine in the podcast Wooden Overcoats.

== Early life ==
Lang was born Belinda Lucy Lange, in the Marylebone district in West London, in 1953, the daughter of actors Jeremy Hawk and Joan Heal. The family surname was later shortened to Lang.

== Career ==
=== Television ===
After a small part as 'Girl in Bath' in Play for Today in 1980, she appeared later that year as Beth in the TV adaptation of To Serve Them All My Days. Following this, she had several one-off appearances and small parts until her breakthrough role as Kate in Dear John (1986–1987). Following this she played Martha Brett in The Bretts (1987–1988), during which she acted alongside her future husband, Hugh Fraser. Around the same time, she replaced Phyllis Logan in the role as Sheila Walsh in Bust. Lang also had a lead part in the television series Inspector Alleyn Mysteries, in which she played the artist Agatha Troy between 1990 and 1994.

In 1991, she took a lead role in 2point4 Children alongside Gary Olsen. The sitcom ran for eight series, ending in 1999.

In 2000, she appeared as Christine Hamilton in the television film Justice in Wonderland.

Since 2point4 Children, Lang has rarely appeared on television, instead taking on more stage work. She has, however, made guest appearances in several programmes, including playing the ill-fated business woman Elspeth Inkpen-Thomas in Midsomer Murders, and alongside John Nettles and television presenter Quinnie Dorrell in "The Gongoozlers", a 2004 episode of the murder mystery series Rosemary and Thyme. She has also appeared in two episodes of the BBC daytime soap opera Doctors. In 2009, she made a brief return to sitcom, playing Margot in an episode of BBC sitcom My Family, and then in 2014 playing Marina Fairchild in Citizen Khan, another BBC series.

From 2022, she appeared as landlady Mrs Clam in Sister Boniface Mysteries in a recurring role.

=== Radio ===
In 1988, Lang appeared in the BBC Radio 4 play Hard of Hearing opposite Graham Blockey. She took part in Stilgoe's Around, also broadcast on Radio 4 and BBC Radio 2. Second Thoughts was based on a radio programme originally broadcast on Radio 4. From 2015 to 2022, with a hiatus for production required due to the COVID-19 pandemic, she voiced the anthropomorphic mouse and narrator Madeleine in the sitcom audio podcast Wooden Overcoats.

=== Theatre ===
Lang has taken on many stage roles. She is part of the cast of the touring play Seven Deadly Sins Four Deadly Sinners and Ladies in Lavender starring alongside Hayley Mills.

Lang appeared with Nicholas Farrell and David Robb in Alan Bennett's "Single Spies" play during 2016. Her other theatre credits include Present Laughter (1981), The Clandestine Marriage (1984), Dead Funny (1995), Blithe Spirit (1997), and Hay Fever (2006). BBC Proms 2017 "Aunt Eller" in Oklahoma with the John Wilson Orchestra (2017).

In 2003, she established Haig-Lang productions with David Haig with the intention of producing plays and managing their own touring schedules; together they have worked on a number of productions including Hay Fever, My Boy Jack and Private Lives.

She is now a vice-president of the theatre charity The Theatrical Guild, having been involved with them for many years. Lang was chairman from 2009 to 2011 and continues to help promote them among the theatrical profession.

== Personal life ==
In 1988, Lang married actor Hugh Fraser, with whom she has one daughter.

== Selected credits ==
=== Television & film ===
Year	Title	Role	Notes
1980	Play for Today	Girl in bath	The Imitation Game
1980	To Serve Them All My Days	Beth	4 episodes
1983	A Brother's Tale	Eileen Taylor	3 episodes
1983	The Cabbage Patch	Susie	7 episodes
1984	The Clairvoyant	Senior Nurse	1 episode
1985	Operation Julie	D.C Joy Brookes	TV Movie
1986	Unnatural Causes	Helen Cassady	Episode: "Home Cooking"
1986	Victoria Wood As Seen on TV	Soldier's Girlfriend	1 episode
1986–1987	Dear John	Kate	12 episodes
1987–1988	The Bretts	Kate Brett	19 episodes
1988	Bust	Sheila Walsh	6 episodes
1989	Stay Lucky	Lady Karen Winderscale	2 episodes
1990	Making News	Suzanne Critchley	Episode: "Yes We Have No Secrets"
1990–1994	The Inspector Alleyn Mysteries	Agatha Troy	6 episodes
1991–1994	Second Thoughts	Liza Ferrari	42 episodes
1991–1999	2point4 Children	Bill Porter	56 episodes
1996	The Office	Mrs Platt (voice only)	TV Movie
1999	The Comedy Trail: A Shaggy Dog Story	Bill Porter	TV special
2000	Justice in Wonderland	Christine Hamilton	TV Movie
2000	Midsomer Murders	Elspeth Inkpen-Thomas	Episode: "Garden of Death"
2004	Rosemary & Thyme	Quinnie Dorell	Episode: "The Gongoozlers"
2007	Three Minute Moments	Esther	Film
2008	Doctors	Anne Marie Cavendish	Episode: "The Honey Trap"
2009	My Family	Margot	Episode: "A Very Brief Encounter"
2013	Doctors	Clarissa Auden	Episode: "A Few Bits"
2014	Citizen Khan	Marina Fairchild	Episode: "Farmer Khan"
2022–present	Sister Boniface Mysteries	Mrs Clam	22 episodes

=== Theatre ===
Year	Title	Role	Notes
1977	Teeth 'n' Smiles	Laura	Oxford Playhouse, Oxford
1978	Cabaret	Sally Bowles	The Northcott, Exeter
1979	Mr Puntila and His Man Mati	Eva	Theatre Royal, Stratford
1981	Present Laughter	Daphne Stillington	Greenwich Theatre, London and Vaudeville Theatre
1982	Hobson's Choice	Vicky Hobson	Theatre Royal, Haymarket
1983	Antigone	Isme	The National Theatre, London
1983–1984	The Cladestine Marriage	Miss Sterling	UK tour
1986	The Women	Miriam Arons	Theatre of Comedy, The National Theatre
1989	Thark	Kitty Stratton	Lyric Theatre, Hammersmith
1996	Dead Funny	Eleanor	UK tour
1997	Blithe Spirit	Ruth Codomine	Theatre Royal, Bath; and Chichester Festival Theatre
1999	Things We Do For Love	Barbara	UK tour
2001	Life x 3	Sonia	Theatre Royal, Bath; and Savoy Theatre, London
2003	The Chalk Garden	Miss Madrigal	UK tour
2005	What the Butler Saw	Mrs Prentice	Criterieon Theatre, London
2006	Hay Fever	Myra Arundel	Theatre Royal, Haymarket
2009	A Song in Twilight	Carlotta	UK tour
2009	East is East	Ella	Birmingham Repertory Theatre, Birmingham
2011	Ladies in Lavender	Janet	Richmond Theatre, London
2016	Single Spies	Coral Browne/ HM Queen	UK tour
2017	Duet for One	Stephanie	UK tour
2017	Gabriel	Jeanne Becquet	UK tour
2018	The Country Wife	Lady Fidget	Minerva Theatre, Chichester
2018	Humble Boy	Flora Humble	Orange Tree Theatre, Richmond
2025	Little Women	Aunt March	UK tour
