= Entertaining Angels (play) =

2006 play by Richard Everett

- Written by: Richard Everett
- Original language: English
- Setting: United Kingdom

Premiere
- Date premiered: 2006
- Place premiered: Chichester Festival Theatre, Chichester, United Kingdom

Entertaining Angels is a play by Richard Everett. The production was directed by Alan Strachan and produced by Michael Codron.

== Plot ==
As a vicar's wife, Grace (Penelope Keith) has spent a lifetime trying to meet other people's expectations. Now, after the death of her husband Bardolph, she enjoys the freedom of being able to do and say exactly what she wants. The return of her eccentric missionary sister, Ruth, together with some disturbing revelations, forces Grace to confront the truth of her marriage.

== Cast ==
Penelope Keith plays Grace with Benjamin Whitrow as her late husband. The rest of the cast include Polly Adams, Carolyn Backhouse and Claudia Elmhirst. It was directed by Alan Strachan and produced by Michael Codron

== Reception ==
The play received widely positive reviews, receiving 5 stars from the Edinburgh Guide with The Sunday Times writing that "Richard Everett has written a warm, glowing, serious comedy, like an Ayckbourn play finished by JM Barrie", while the London Evening Standard reviewed the play as a “very English comedy with some real emotion .. scratch the surface and you’ll find interesting undercurrents rippling the water .. Adultery, miscarriage, divorce and deception interestingly handled all, are just some of the problems that writer Richard Everett beds down among well-received jokes .. This is a sure-fire hit”.
