= Jim Thompson bibliography =

- Books↙: 1
- Novels↙: 29
- Stories↙: 34
- Scripts↙: 2

The bibliography of Jim Thompson (1906–1977) includes novels, short stories and screenplays.

== Novels ==
| Title | Date | Notes |
|---|---|---|
| Now and on Earth | 1942 | |
| Heed the Thunder | 1946 | |
| Nothing More Than Murder | 1949 | Also published as Murder at the Bijou |
| Cropper's Cabin | 1952 | Also published as Sharecropper Hell |
| The Killer Inside Me | 1952 | Adapted into a TV movie in 1976 and a theatrical film in 2010 |
| The Criminal | 1953 | |
| Recoil | 1953 | |
| The Alcoholics | 1953 | |
| Savage Night | 1953 | |
| The Golden Gizmo | 1954 | |
| A Swell-Looking Babe | 1954 | Adapted as Hit Me (1996) |
| The Nothing Man | 1954 | |
| A Hell of a Woman | 1954 | Adapted as Série noire (1979) |
| King Blood | 1954 | |
| After Dark, My Sweet | 1957 | Adapted as a film in 1990 |
| The Kill-Off | 1957 | Adapted in 1989 |
| Flint | 1957 | Under pseudonym Gil Dodge |
| Wild Town | 1957 | |
| The Getaway | 1958 | Adapted in 1972 and 1994 |
| The Transgressors | 1961 | |
| The Grifters | 1963 | Adapted as a film in 1990 |
| Pop. 1280 | 1964 | Adapted as Coup de Torchon |
| Texas by the Tail | 1965 | |
| South of Heaven | 1967 | |
| Ironside | 1967 | |
| The Undefeated | 1969 | Novelization of The Undefeated |
| Nothing but a Man | 1970 | |
| Child of Rage | 1972 | |
| The Rip-Off | 1988 | Posthumous release |

== Non-fiction ==
| Title | Date | Notes |
|---|---|---|
| Bad Boy | 1953 | Memoir |
| Roughneck | 1954 | Memoir |

== Collections ==
| Title | Date | Notes |
|---|---|---|
| Fireworks: The Lost Writings of Jim Thompson | 1988 | |

== Short Stories ==
| Title | Decade | Notes |
|---|---|---|
| The End of the Book | | |
| The Strange Death of Eugene Kling | | |
| Oil Field Vignettes | | |
| Thieves of the Field | | |
| Frozen Footprints | | |
| Gentlemen of the Jungle | | |
| Snake Magee's Rotary Boiler | | |
| Ditch of Doom | | |
| Oklahoma's Conspiring Lovers | | |
| A Penny in the Dust | | |
| Character at Iraan | | |
| Illicit Lovers and the Walking Corpse | | |
| Time Without End | | |
| Death Missed a Bet | | |
| Murder Came on the Mayflower | | |
| Exactly What Happened | | |
| The Threesome in Four-C | | |
| The Dark Stair | | |

== Screenplays ==
| Title | Date | Director |
|---|---|---|
| The Killing | 1956 | Stanley Kubrick |
| Paths of Glory | 1957 | Stanley Kubrick |
