= List of awards and nominations received by Joe Pesci =

Joe Pesci awards and nominations
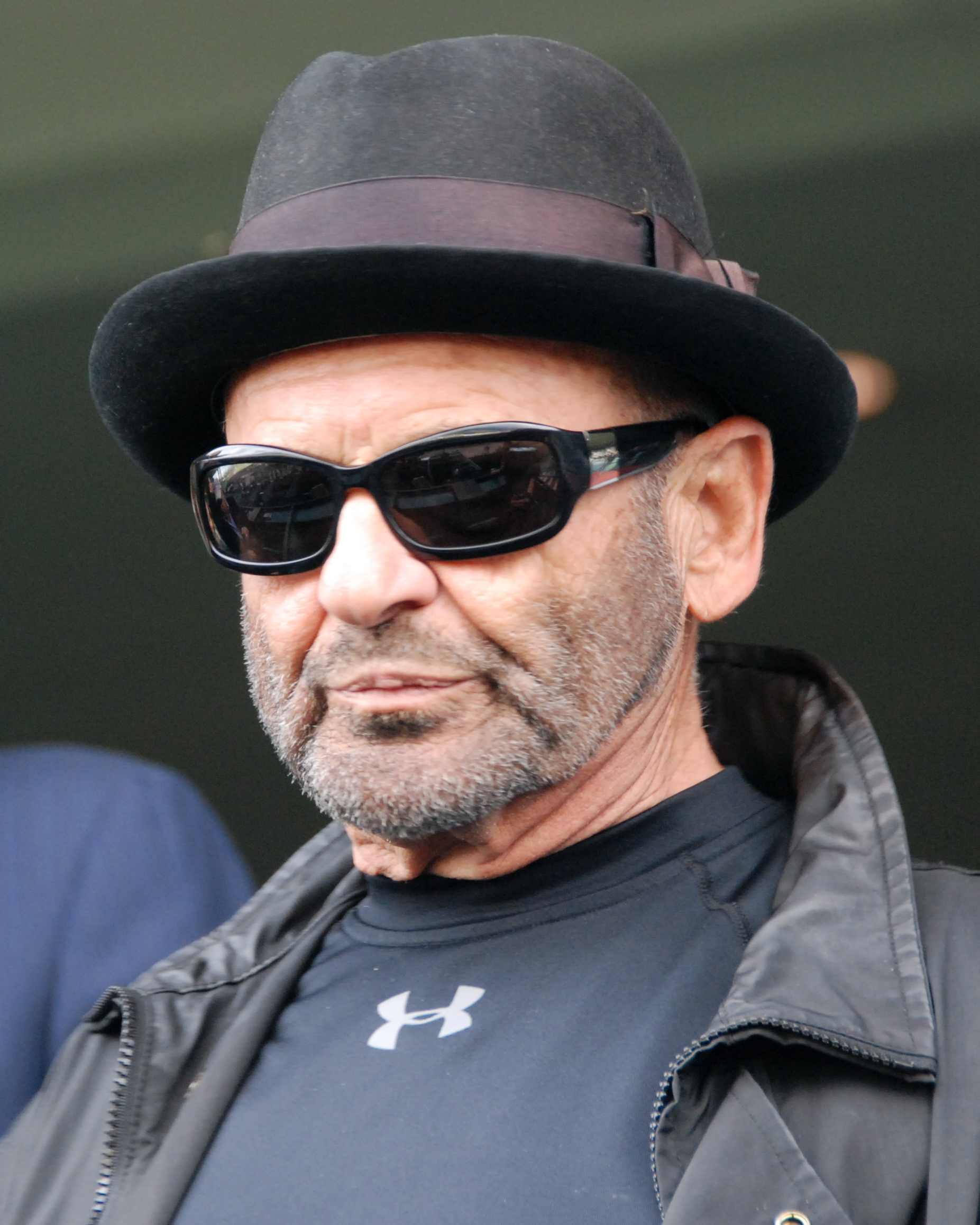
- Pesci in 2009
Awards and nominations
Award	Wins	Nominations
Golden Globe	0	3
Academy Awards	1	3
BAFTA Awards	1	2
Screen Actors Guild Awards	0	2

The following is a list of awards and nominations received by Joe Pesci. Pesci won the BAFTA Award for Most Outstanding Newcomer to Lead Film Roles and was nominated for the Academy Award for Best Supporting Actor and Golden Globe Award for Best Supporting Actor in a Motion Picture for his role as Joey LaMotta in Raging Bull. He won the Academy Award for Best Supporting Actor for portraying psychopathic gangster Tommy DeVito (based on Thomas DeSimone) in Goodfellas, and was nominated for the Golden Globe Award for Best Supporting Actor in a Motion Picture. He was nominated for the latter again and the Screen Actors Guild Award for Outstanding Performance by a Male Actor in a Supporting Role for playing Russell Bufalino in The Irishman.

== Major associations ==
=== Academy Awards ===
Year	Nominated work	Category	Result
1981	Raging Bull	Best Supporting Actor	Nominated
1991	Goodfellas	Best Supporting Actor	Won
2020	The Irishman	Best Supporting Actor	Nominated

=== British Academy Film Awards ===
Year	Nominated work	Category	Result
1982	Raging Bull	Most Promising Newcomer to Leading Film Roles	Won
2020	The Irishman	Best Actor in a Supporting Role	Nominated

=== Golden Globe Awards ===
Year	Nominated work	Category	Result
1981	Raging Bull	Best Supporting Actor – Motion Picture	Nominated
1991	Goodfellas	Best Supporting Actor – Motion Picture	Nominated
2020	The Irishman	Best Supporting Actor – Motion Picture	Nominated

=== Screen Actors Guild Awards ===
Year	Nominated work	Category	Result
2020	The Irishman	Outstanding Performance by a Male Actor in a Supporting Role	Nominated
2020	The Irishman	Outstanding Performance by a Cast in a Motion Picture	Nominated

== Other associations ==
=== 20/20 Award ===
Year	Nominated work	Category	Result
2011	Goodfellas	Best Supporting Actor	Won

=== American Comedy Awards ===
Year	Nominated work	Category	Result
1993	My Cousin Vinny	Funniest Lead Actor in a Motion Picture	Won
1993	Home Alone 2: Lost in New York	Funniest Supporting Actor in a Motion Picture	Nominated

=== Australian Academy of Cinema and Television Arts Awards ===
Year	Nominated work	Category	Result
2020	The Irishman	Best International Supporting Actor – Cinema	Nominated

=== Award Circuit Community Award ===
Year	Nominated work	Category	Result
1995	Casino	Best Cast Ensemble	Nominated

=== Berlin International Film Festival ===
Year	Nominated work	Category	Result
2007	The Good Shepherd	Outstanding Artistic Contribution	Won

=== Blockbuster Entertainment Awards ===
Year	Nominated work	Category	Result
1999	Lethal Weapon 4	Favorite Supporting Actor – Action/Adventure	Nominated

=== Boston Society of Film Critics ===
Year	Nominated work	Category	Result
1991	Goodfellas	Best Supporting Actor	Won

=== CableACE Award ===
Year	Nominated work	Category	Result
1993	Tales from the Crypt	Actor in a Dramatic Series	Nominated

=== Chicago Film Critics Association ===
Year	Nominated work	Category	Result
1991	Goodfellas	Best Supporting Actor	Won

=== Critics' Choice Awards ===
Year	Nominated work	Category	Result
2020	The Irishman	Best Movie Cast	Won
2020	The Irishman	Best Movie Supporting Actor	Nominated

=== Dallas–Fort Worth Film Critics Association ===
Year	Nominated work	Category	Result
1991	Goodfellas	Best Supporting Actor	Won

=== Golden Raspberry Awards ===
Year	Nominated work	Category	Result
1999	Lethal Weapon 4	Worst Supporting Actor	Nominated

=== Hollywood Critics Association ===
Year	Nominated work	Category	Result
2020	The Irishman	Best Supporting Actor	Won

=== Kansas City Film Critics Circle Award ===
Year	Nominated work	Category	Result
1990	Goodfellas	Best Supporting Actor	Won

=== Los Angeles Film Critics Association ===
Year	Nominated work	Category	Result
1990	Goodfellas	Best Supporting Actor	Won

=== MTV Movie & TV Awards ===
Year	Nominated work	Category	Result
1993	My Cousin Vinny	Best Comedic Performance	Nominated
1996	Casino	Best Villain	Nominated

=== National Board of Review ===
Year	Nominated work	Category	Result
1981	Raging Bull	Best Supporting Actor	Won
1991	Goodfellas	Best Supporting Actor	Won

=== National Society of Film Critics ===
Year	Nominated work	Category	Result
1981	Raging Bull	Best Supporting Actor	Won
1991	Goodfellas	Best Supporting Actor	Nominated

=== New York Film Critics Circle ===
Year	Nominated work	Category	Result
1980	Raging Bull	Best Supporting Actor	Won
1991	Goodfellas	Best Supporting Actor	Nominated
2020	The Irishman	Best Supporting Actor	Won

=== Satellite Awards ===
Year	Nominated work	Category	Result
2020	The Irishman	Best Supporting Actor in a Film	Nominated

=== The Stinkers Bad Movie Award ===
Year	Nominated work	Category	Result
1997	Gone Fishin'	Worst Actor	Nominated
