= Hotel Texas =

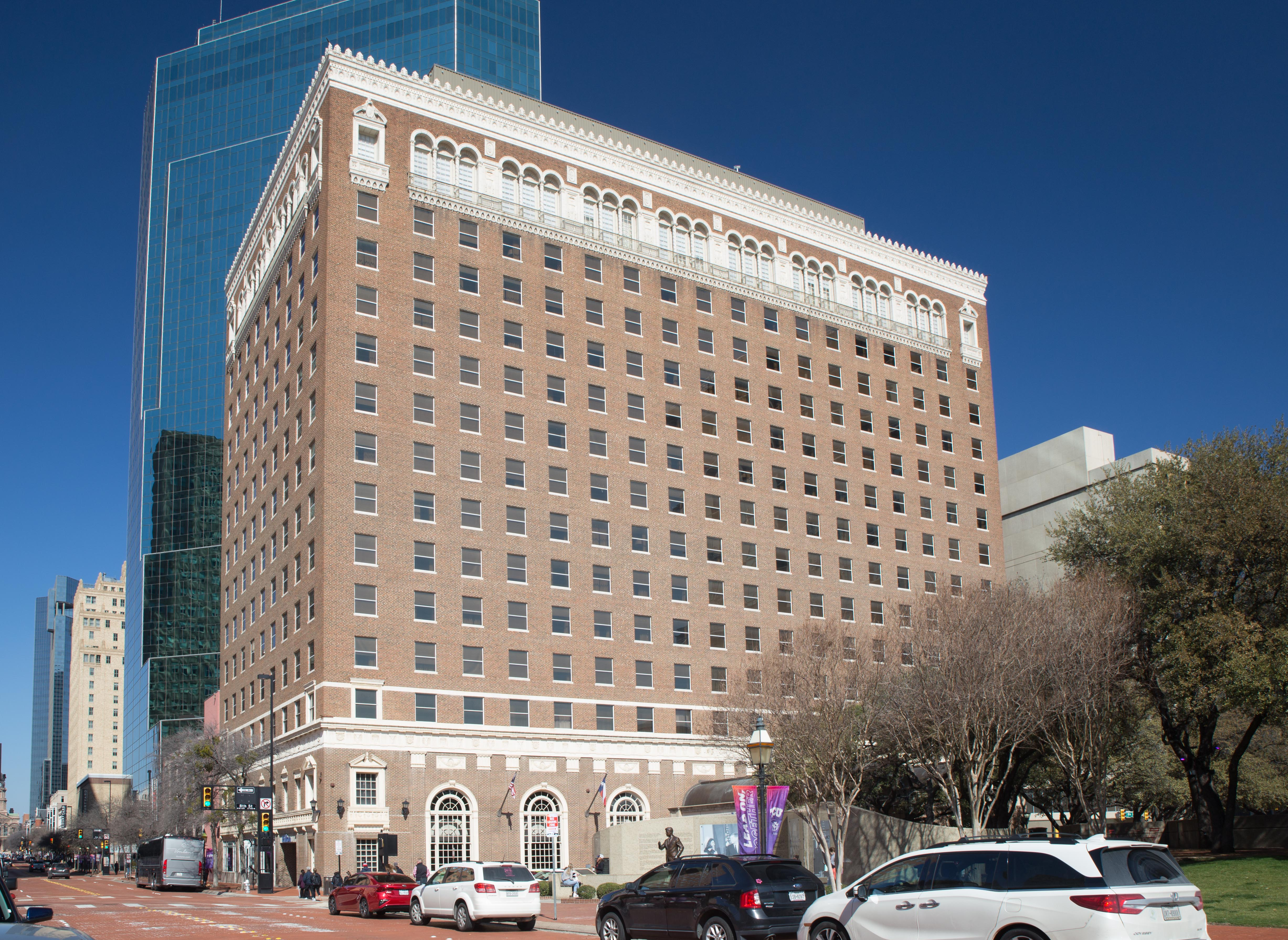
- Hilton Fort Worth in 2023

- Location within Texas Location within the United States

General information
- Type: Hotel
- Architectural style: Chicago, Renaissance, Georgian Revival
- Location: 815 Main St., Fort Worth, Texas, United States
- Coordinates: 32°45′9″N 97°19′45″W
- Construction started: 1920
- Completed: 1921

Height
- Roof: 55.5 m (182 ft)

Technical details
- Floor count: 15
- Grounds: 1 acre (0.40 ha)

Design and construction
- Architecture firm: Sanguinet & Staats, Marvan, Russell & Clowell

Other information
- Number of rooms: 294

Website
- Hilton Fort Worth
- Hotel Texas
- U.S. National Register of Historic Places
- Recorded Texas Historic Landmark
- NRHP reference No.: 79003011 (original); 14000966 (increase)
- RTHL No.: 2574

Significant dates
- Added to NRHP: July 3, 1979
- Boundary increase: November 26, 2014
- Designated RTHL: 1982

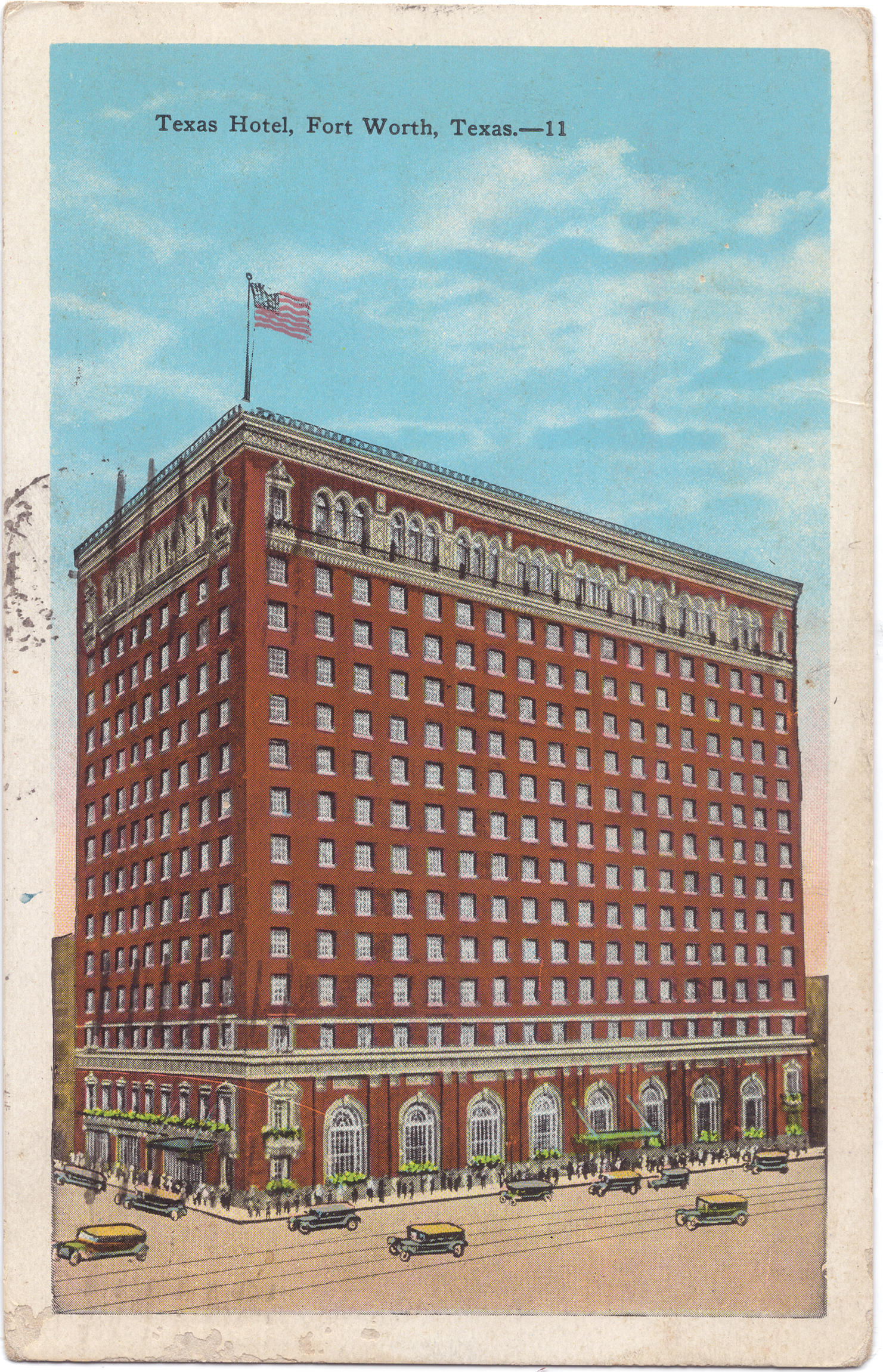
Postcard of Hotel Texas, 1928

The Hilton Fort Worth is a historic hotel in downtown Fort Worth, Texas. Because of its architectural and historic significance, the hotel was inducted into Historic Hotels of America, the official program of the National Trust for Historic Preservation, in 2016.

== History ==
Constructed from 1920 to 1921 as the Hotel Texas, it was designed by Sanguinet & Staats and Mauran, Russell, & Crowell, with Westlake Construction Co. as the contractor. A two-story addition was constructed to the North in 1963, featuring a bank on the ground floor and a new 25,000 sq ft ballroom on the second level. On November 21, 1963, United States president John F. Kennedy and his wife, Jackie stayed at the hotel in Room 850. The next morning, Kennedy gave what would be his last address in the Crystal Ballroom, just hours before he was assassinated in Dallas. There is now a JFK Tribute memorial right across from the hotel.

The hotel became the Sheraton-Fort Worth Hotel in 1968. A major renovation, completed in 1970, coincided with the opening of the Fort Worth Convention Center, making the hotel a "headquarters hotel" for the center. In the main building, the work involved splitting the original two-story lobby into two floors, with additional meeting rooms on the upper level, and the renovation of the guest rooms, reducing their number to 289. It also included the addition of a new 49 m (161 ft) 230-room, 8-floor hotel annex atop a 5-story parking garage built in 1928, across Commerce Street from the hotel and linked to the main building by a skybridge.

The Sheraton closed in 1979. The hotel was gutted and renovated at a cost of $33 million by architects Jarvis, Putty, Jarvis. The lobby was returned to its original two-story configuration, the interior was entirely redone, an atrium was created between the rear wings of the U-shaped tower, and new lighting was installed on the upper levels to resemble the original lighting of the hotel. The hotel reopened in January 1981 as the Hyatt Regency Fort Worth.

The hotel was renamed the Radisson Fort Worth in 1995. Under Radisson, the lights on the upper floors were turned off. From 2005 to 2006, the hotel's interiors were renovated, and it was renamed the Hilton Fort Worth on April 1, 2006. The 1970 annex tower was not renovated. Instead, it was sold off and left vacant. The Hilton Fort Worth currently contains 294 guest rooms. Part of the new work for the conversion included relighting the top of the building.

The structure was added to the National Register of Historic Places on July 3, 1979. A boundary increase was approved in November 2014 to include the annex as part of the listing.

Jim Thompson, the American author and screenwriter, known for his hardboiled crime fiction (The Getaway, The Grifters, After Dark, My Sweet), worked as a bellboy at the Hotel Texas for two years during Prohibition while attending high school during the day.

== Annex ==
In 2015, plans were announced to convert the 1970 annex, empty since 2006, to an apartment building with 140 units. In 2020, plans were announced to reopen the annex as a hotel, operated by the Le Méridien brand of Marriott International. The Le Méridien Fort Worth Downtown opened in August 2024.

== See also ==
- National Register of Historic Places listings in Tarrant County, Texas
- List of memorials to John F. Kennedy
- Recorded Texas Historic Landmarks in Tarrant County
