= Rip off =

Rip off or rip-off may refer to:

- Ripoff, a bad financial transaction
- Confidence trick, an attempt to defraud a person
- Knockoffs, or fake goods
- Rip Off (video game), a 1980 arcade game
- Rip-Off (film), a 1971 Canadian comedy
- The Rip-Off (film), a 1980 film starring Lee Van Cleef
- The Rip-Off (novel), a crime novel by Jim Thompson
- "Rip Off", by Ryan Adams from the album Easy Tiger

== See also ==
- Rip-off Britain
- Rip Off Press
- Ripped Off (1972 film) Italian crime film
- Rip It Off (disambiguation)
- Rip (disambiguation)
