= The Sheltering Sky (film) =

1990 British/Italian film by Bernardo Bertolucci

- Theatrical release poster by Renato Casaro
- Directed by: Bernardo Bertolucci
- Screenplay by: Mark Peploe; Bernardo Bertolucci
- Based on: The Sheltering Sky by Paul Bowles
- Produced by: Jeremy Thomas
- Starring: Debra Winger; John Malkovich; Campbell Scott; Jill Bennett; Timothy Spall; Éric Vu-An
- Cinematography: Vittorio Storaro
- Edited by: Gabriella Cristiani
- Music by: Ryuichi Sakamoto; Richard Horowitz
- Production company: Recorded Picture Company
- Distributed by: Warner Bros. Pictures (United States) Palace Pictures (United Kingdom); Penta Distribuzione (Italy)
- Release date: 14 December 1990
- Running time: 138 minutes
- Countries: United Kingdom; Italy
- Language: English
- Budget: $25 million
- Box office: $2 million

The Sheltering Sky is a 1990 drama film co-written and directed by Bernardo Bertolucci starring Debra Winger and John Malkovich. The film is based on the 1949 novel of the same name by Paul Bowles (who appears in a cameo role) about a couple who journey to North Africa in the hopes of rekindling their marriage but soon fall prey to the dangers that surround them.

== Plot ==
Three Americans from New York arrive in Oran, French Algeria, in 1947. Port Moresby and his wife Kit are accompanied by their friend George Tunner on a trip that will take them deep into the Sahara Desert. Tunner observes, "We're probably the first tourists they've had since the war," to which Kit replies "We're not tourists. We're travelers." While Tunner plans to return home in a few weeks, Port and Kit plan on staying for a year or two.

While awaiting transport to a hotel, the group meets a pair of English travelers, Mrs. Lyle, a travel writer, and Eric, her adult son. Eric's mother keeps him constantly short of money so he is always asking for credit and loans. After arriving at the hotel, they sit in the hotel bar and are observed by an older man sitting alone at a table.

Port invites Kit to accompany him for a walk in the city. After she refuses and rebuffs his romantic advances, Port angrily leaves. During his walk he meets a pimp who introduces him to a prostitute in a Berber encampment. The two have sex and the prostitute attempts to steal his wallet. Port quickly leaves and is chased from the camp by a mob.

The next morning Tunner arrives at Kit's room to take her shopping. Not wanting Tunner to know that Port stayed out all night, she removes the covers from his bed to make it appear that he slept there. As Kit and Tunner are preparing to leave, a disheveled Port arrives. Seeing his bed, he assumes that Tunner spent the night with Kit.

Port and Kit once again encounter the Lyles and are offered a ride in their car to Boucif, their next destination, but are informed that there is no room for Tunner. Port accepts the ride with the Lyles while Kit and Tunner take the train. Tunner and Kit drink champagne and awake the next morning in Kit's hotel room after a drunken tryst.

Suspicious of Kit's relationship with Tunner, Port arranges for Eric Lyle to provide Tunner with transportation to Messad on the pretext that Port and Kit will meet him later. Eric agrees but also steals Port's passport.

In Bounoura, Port discovers his passport missing. Even after being informed by local officials that the passport can be recovered in Messad, Port decides to proceed by bus to El Ga'a with Kit in order to avoid a meeting with Tunner. On the journey, Port contracts typhoid fever. The hotel won't accommodate them from fear of infection. Kit transports the delirious Port to a French Foreign Legion post, but it has no doctor and she nurses him herself, becoming increasingly desperate at his condition. He eventually dies beside her in their room. Kit leaves the body and sets off alone into the Sahara.

Kit wanders in the desert until she begs a ride from a camel train led by a Tuareg, Belqassim. After the caravan arrives at his home in Niger, Belqassim disguises Kit as a boy and locks her in a guest house. Although held captive, Kit welcomes Belqassim's advances and the two begin an affair. Kit is soon discovered by Belqassim's wives, who order her to leave. Kit finds herself disoriented in the local marketplace and is set upon by a mob. She is eventually found, mute and almost insane, in a Catholic mission hospital by staff of the American embassy, who have been prompted to search for her by Tunner, who has found Port's grave. She is transported back to Tangier, and is told that Tunner is waiting for her there. After arriving at the hotel, Kit flees into the city before Tunner can meet her.

== Cast ==
- Debra Winger as Kit Moresby
- John Malkovich as Port Moresby
- Campbell Scott as George Tunner
- Jill Bennett as Mrs. Lyle
- Timothy Spall as Eric Lyle
- Éric Vu-An as Belqassim
- Amina Annabi as Mahrnia
- Philippe Morier-Genoud as Captain Broussard
- Nicoletta Braschi as a French woman
- Sotigui Kouyaté as Abdelkader
- Tom Novembre as French Immigration Officer
- Paul Bowles (uncredited) as an Old Man

== Soundtrack ==
The soundtrack, composed by Ryuichi Sakamoto, won the Golden Globe Award for Best Original Score and the LAFCA Award for Best Music.

== Critical reception ==
On review aggregator Rotten Tomatoes, 45% of 29 critics gave the film a positive review, with an average rating of 5.4/10. The website's critics consensus reads: "The Sheltering Sky puts its talented stars at odds with a misguided and largely unsatisfying adaptation of potentially unfilmable source material." Among those praising the film was The New York Times film critic Vincent Canby, who described it as a "long, beautifully modulated cry of despair." Roger Ebert gave the movie two stars, stating he "was left with the impression of my fingers closing on air." Author Raj Chandarlapaty opines that Bertolucci's movie does a "remarkable job sweetening the picture of Belqassim for today's viewing audience", as opposed to the "erratic brutishness" of the novel's character.

In 1998, Paul Bowles wrote a new preface to the novel in which he stated "the less said about the film now, the better."

== Awards and nominations ==
Award	Category	Nominee(s)	Result
Boston Society of Film Critics Awards	Best Cinematography	Vittorio Storaro (also for Dick Tracy)	Won
British Academy Film Awards	Best Cinematography	Vittorio Storaro	Won
British Academy Film Awards	Best Production Design	Gianni Silvestri	Nominated
Golden Ciak Awards	Best Film	Bernardo Bertolucci	Won
Golden Ciak Awards	Best Director	Bernardo Bertolucci	Won
Golden Ciak Awards	Best Cinematography	Vittorio Storaro	Won
Golden Ciak Awards	Best Editing	Gabriella Cristiani	Nominated
Golden Ciak Awards	Best Production Design	Gianni Silvestri	Nominated
Golden Globe Awards	Best Director	Bernardo Bertolucci	Nominated
Golden Globe Awards	Best Original Score	Ryuichi Sakamoto and Richard Horowitz	Won
Los Angeles Film Critics Association Awards	Best Cinematography	Vittorio Storaro	Runner-up
Los Angeles Film Critics Association Awards	Best Music Score	Ryuichi Sakamoto and Richard Horowitz	Won
Nastro d'Argento	Best Director	Bernardo Bertolucci	Nominated
Nastro d'Argento	Best Cinematography	Vittorio Storaro	Won
National Society of Film Critics Awards	Best Actress	Debra Winger	3rd Place
New York Film Critics Circle Awards	Best Director	Bernardo Bertolucci	Runner-up
New York Film Critics Circle Awards	Best Cinematographer	Vittorio Storaro	Won
