= Steven Shainberg =

American film director and producer (born 1963)

- Born: February 5, 1963 (age 62)
- Occupations: Film director, producer, screenwriter

Steven Shainberg (born February 5, 1963) is an American film director and producer. He is the nephew of author Lawrence Shainberg. Both are part of the Shainberg family of Memphis, Tennessee, founder of the Shainberg's chain of stores, which is now part of Dollar General.

== Biography ==
Shainberg received his BA from Yale University in English Literature and East Asian studies. After graduation, he worked as a location manager, assistant director, production coordinator, and assistant editor on a number of films, commercials, and rock videos. He also worked as an independent producer developing adaptations of Joseph Conrad’s The Secret Agent and Henry James’ The Americans. At the American Film Institute, he directed and wrote four short films including The Prom starring Jennifer Jason Leigh, Andras Jones and J. T. Walsh. The Prom won the Grand Prize at the Houston International Film Festival, the Critics’ Award at the Breckenridge Film Festival, and the silver medal for Drama at the New York Film Festival.

In 1998, his short film series Mr. Viril (Angela & Viril, Alice & Viril) ran for almost six months on MTV, in addition to his video for Debbie Harry’s "Strike Me Pink". The former starred a young Angelina Jolie.

== Films ==
Shainberg's first feature film Hit Me, based on the Jim Thompson novel A Swell-Looking Babe, premiered at the Toronto International Film Festival in 1996 was released in theaters in August 1998. However, Shainberg's breakthrough did not come until 2002's Secretary.

Secretary stars Maggie Gyllenhaal as a mentally ill young woman who gets a job as a secretary to a lawyer played by James Spader. The story follows the two characters as they develop a sexual, sadomasochistic relationship. The film was well received and honored with numerous awards including a Special Jury Prize at the Sundance Film Festival, and a Golden Globe Award nomination for Maggie Gyllenhaal.

Shainberg's film Fur: An Imaginary Portrait of Diane Arbus starring Nicole Kidman and Robert Downey Jr. was a fictionalized account of the life of renowned photographer Diane Arbus. The film, released in 2006, received mixed reviews from critics.

== Filmography ==
- The Prom (1992)
- Angela & Viril (1993)
- Alice & Viril (1993)
- Hit Me (1996)
- Secretary (2002)
- Fur (2006)
- Rupture (2016)
