= Rip It Off =

Rip It Off may refer to:

- Rip It Off (Stroke 9 album)
- Rip It Off (Times New Viking album)
- Rip It Off also released as Beyond the City Limits, a 2002 heist film directed by Gigi Gaston

== See also ==
- rip off (disambiguation)
