= Hit Me (film) =

- VHS cover
- Directed by: Steven Shainberg
- Screenplay by: Denis Johnson
- Based on: A Swell-Looking Babe by Jim Thompson
- Produced by: Gregory Goodman; Steven Shainberg
- Starring: Elias Koteas; Laure Marsac; William H. Macy
- Cinematography: Mark J. Gordon
- Edited by: Donn Aron
- Music by: Peter Manning Robinson
- Production company: Slough Pond
- Release dates: September 9, 1996 (Toronto); September 25, 1998 (United States)
- Running time: 125 minutes
- Country: United States
- Language: English

Hit Me is a 1996 American crime film directed by Steven Shainberg starring Elias Koteas, Laure Marsac, and William H. Macy. The film is based on the novel A Swell-Looking Babe by Jim Thompson.

== Plot ==
In a hotel, bellhop Sonny struggles to pay back a loan to head of security Jack Cougar. Hotel guest Monique tempts Sonny, who eventually has sex with her. She then stands up and begins screaming. Sonny punches her out in a panic and flees.

Del, a former bellhop now working for gangster Lenny Ish and staying in the room next to Monique, tells Sonny that he will take care of the situation. Sonny sees Del and Cougar forcibly removing Monique from the hotel and tells Del that he does not want her to be killed. Del says that she could be paid to keep quiet for $5,000 and invites Sonny to take part in a heist of Lenny Ish's high-stakes poker game at the hotel, promising to give Lenny 10% of the total haul of $700,000. Monique visits Sonny one night and confesses that she was hired by Del to be a hostess at the game, and was then paid to seduce Sonny and scream that it was rape to force him into joining the heist.

The heist takes place the Tuesday night before the Wednesday game. Cougar takes the keys to the hotel safety deposit boxes from the poker players at gunpoint. The other two bellhops, Bascomb and Billy, are supposed to take a break to eat and leave Sonny alone at this time but have decided to eat at the front desk instead. Del arrives and forces Bascomb to hand the stolen keys to Sonny. However, during the handover, the keys are dropped and mixed up. Bascomb and Sonny try the forty keys in each of the forty lock boxes. Sonny closes the security door and locks himself and Bascomb in the lock box room. Billy attempts to talk Del and Cougar out of the heist but is shot dead by Cougar. Cougar shoots Bascomb through the mail slot in the door then pushes the gun through it and tells Sonny to finish him off as he and Del leave the hotel. Sonny, wearing gloves, uses the gun to kill Bascomb. Sonny puts his share in a child's backpack and gives it to his brother to drive home. He takes the remaining money from Bascomb's corpse and puts it in a bag, which he sends up to Monique's room in the elevator.

An interrogator questions Sonny at the police station, saying that no losses were declared by the robbed guests due to the illegal nature of the planned game. Sonny insists that he was not involved and is released. He receives a call from Del claiming that Monique demands the money and that Sonny is to leave it in the trunk of a specific Cadillac for them, but Sonny knows that he is lying about Monique. Sonny admits to Monique that he killed Bascomb, and they make plans to flee together with his share of the money. Sonny is confronted by Del and Cougar at the drop-off, and they insist that Monique demands Sonny's share as well. Sonny says that Monique is with him. When Cougar puts a gun to Sonny's head, Monique comes out from her hiding spot and shoots Cougar. Del runs away with the money. Monique chases after him and shoots him. Sonny finishes him off with another bullet. Monique wipes the gun clean, and they return home to his intellectually disabled older brother Leroy.

Lenny Ish and one of his enforcers confront Sonny at his home and demand the money. Ish had planned to be robbed in exchange for part of the money, but Del and Cougar betrayed him. Sonny and Monique give him the money, which Ish says he will loan to the hotel manager Mr. Stillwell to pay off the heist's victims in exchange for a controlling interest in the hotel. They leave Sonny alive, saying that he will get a bellhop's cut. Monique then departs, leaving Sonny and Leroy alone again.

== Cast ==
- Elias Koteas as Sonny Rose
- Laure Marsac as Monique Roux
- Jay Leggett as Leroy Rose
- Bruce Ramsay as Del Towbridge
- Kevin J. O'Connor as Cougar
- Philip Baker Hall as Lenny Ish
- J.C. Quinn as Fred Bascomb
- Haing S. Ngor as Billy Tungpet
- William H. Macy as Policeman
- Jack Conley as Bodyguard

== Production ==
This was the last film to feature Haing S. Ngor, who died seven months before the film’s release.

Its working title was The Ice Cream Dimension and some resources may still list it as such.

== Release ==
The film premiered at the Toronto International Film Festival on September 9, 1996, followed by a release in US theaters on September 25, 1998.

== Reception ==
The film received mixed reviews.
