= Reversal of Fortune =

1990 American legal drama film directed by Barbet Schroeder

- Theatrical release poster
- Directed by: Barbet Schroeder
- Screenplay by: Nicholas Kazan
- Based on: Reversal of Fortune: Inside the von Bülow Case by Alan Dershowitz
- Produced by: Edward R. Pressman; Oliver Stone
- Starring: Glenn Close; Jeremy Irons; Ron Silver
- Cinematography: Luciano Tovoli
- Edited by: Lee Percy
- Music by: Mark Isham
- Production companies: Reversal Films, Inc.; Sovereign Pictures; Shochiku Fuji Co. Ltd.
- Distributed by: Warner Bros. Inc.
- Release dates: September 12, 1990 (Toronto International Film Festival); October 19, 1990 (United States)
- Running time: 111 minutes
- Country: United States
- Language: English
- Box office: $15.4 million

Reversal of Fortune is a 1990 American legal drama film directed by Barbet Schroeder and adapted from the 1985 book Reversal of Fortune: Inside the von Bülow Case by Harvard law professor Alan Dershowitz.

The film dramatizes the case surrounding the unexplained coma of socialite Sunny von Bülow, the subsequent attempted murder trial of her husband Claus von Bülow, and his eventual acquittal, in which Dershowitz served as part of the defense team. It stars Jeremy Irons as Claus von Bülow, Glenn Close as Sunny von Bülow, and Ron Silver as Alan Dershowitz. Screenwriter Nicholas Kazan originally considered Austrian actor Klaus Maria Brandauer for the role of Claus von Bülow, but Jeremy Irons was ultimately cast.

Released on October 19, 1990, the film was acclaimed by critics. At the 63rd Academy Awards it earned three nominations, including Best Director and Best Screenplay – Based on Material from Another Medium, with Irons winning Best Actor.

== Plot ==
Sunny von Bülow, a millionaire heiress and socialite, lies in a hospital bed in a persistent vegetative state after falling into a coma from diabetic shock on December 21, 1980. She had previously fallen into a coma on December 26, 1979, but had recovered.

Her husband, Claus von Bülow, is charged with attempting to murder her by injecting an overdose of hypoglycemic insulin. During the trial, it is revealed that Claus was having an affair with actress Alexandra Isles and stood to benefit financially if Sunny had died. He is found guilty on two counts of attempted murder.

While Claus is released on bail, he files an appeal and contacts Harvard Law School professor Alan Dershowitz for representation. Dershowitz agrees to take the case only if Claus pays him $300 an hour, as he is simultaneously working to help two young Black men on death row.

As he reviews the case, Dershowitz initially believes Claus is guilty, based largely on the testimony of Maria, the von Bülows’ maid. He is given 45 days to prepare an appeal and assembles a team of law students to assist him.

Dershowitz later learns of David Marriott, a potential witness. At Marriott’s New York apartment, Marriott admits to past involvement in drug trafficking, but Dershowitz considers him unreliable. Meanwhile, Dershowitz’s team discovers that Robert Brillhoffer, the plaintiff’s attorney, had improperly withheld notes that could have supported the defense. They also uncover a magazine interview with Truman Capote, in which he claims Sunny enjoyed mixing drugs and alcohol and had taught herself how to self-inject.

Claus later has lunch with Dershowitz’s team, who question him about Sunny’s earlier overdose on aspirin three weeks before her second coma. Claus is unable to explain what may have motivated a suicide attempt, though he suggests she may have been unhappy. He later admits that he had told Sunny about his affair with Isles during the summer of 1979. After recovering from her first coma, Sunny had reportedly told Claus that he would be better off if she had died.

The defense receives a toxicology report on the encrusted needle, which shows no trace of insulin. Around the same time, Marriott arrives at Dershowitz’s home and claims his earlier affidavit was inaccurate. While secretly recorded, Marriott states that he delivered drugs directly to Sunny on one occasion. He later alters the recording to suggest that Dershowitz agreed to pay him for testimony.

Before the appeal proceeds, Claus recounts the events leading up to Sunny’s second coma, stating that he found her lying face down on the bathroom floor in a cold room with the windows open. Based on this account, Dershowitz begins to believe Claus may be innocent and informs his team that he will seek to overturn the conviction due to insufficient evidence.

After dismissing his class, Dershowitz is informed by his students that they have secured Brillhoffer’s withheld notes and that a jury has overturned two convictions in a related matter. Dershowitz meets Claus at a New York hotel suite and presents the notes, which reveal conflicting circumstantial evidence that could support a second trial defense. Relieved, Claus agrees to pay Dershowitz’s legal fees. Dershowitz tells him that while the outcome is a legal victory, "morally, you are on your own."

Claus is subsequently tried a second time and acquitted, while the two young men on death row remain imprisoned.

== Cast ==
- Glenn Close as Sunny von Bülow
- Jeremy Irons as Claus von Bülow
- Ron Silver as Alan Dershowitz
- Annabella Sciorra as Sarah
- Fisher Stevens as David Marriott
- Uta Hagen as Maria
- Jack Gilpin as Peter MacIntosh
- Christine Baranski as Andrea Reynolds
- Stephen Mailer as Elon Dershowitz
- Felicity Huffman as Minnie
- Johann Carlo as Nancy
- Keith Reddin as Dobbs
- Mitchell Whitfield as Curly
- Tom Wright as Jack
- Michael Lord as Ed
- Lisa Gay Hamilton as Mary
- Julie Hagerty as Alexandra Isles
- Bill Camp as Bill
- Mano Singh as Raj
- Constance Shulman as Pharmacist

== Production ==
Principal photography took place at a number of historic estates in Rhode Island and New Jersey, with additional interior and exterior filming at the Knole Mansion in Old Westbury, New York.

Courtroom scenes were filmed at the Appellate Division, Second Judicial Department in Brooklyn, New York, which has been used for film and television production due to its functioning courtroom facilities and architectural suitability for legal dramas.

Although the real-life events involving Sunny von Bülow took place at Clarendon Court in Newport, Rhode Island, the film does not use the property as a primary exterior location. Instead, establishing shots feature The Breakers, a nearby Gilded Age mansion built for industrialist Cornelius Vanderbilt II, reflecting the production’s emphasis on visually recognisable Newport architecture.

== Reception ==
On the review aggregator website Rotten Tomatoes, 92% of 53 critics' reviews are positive. The website's consensus reads: "Featuring exceptional performances and a cunning script, Reversal of Fortune doubles as a tantalizing mystery and ruthless satire of the rich." Metacritic, which uses a weighted average, assigned the film a score of 93 out of 100, based on 18 critics, indicating "universal acclaim".

=== Accolades ===
Award	Category	Nominee(s)	Result	Ref.
Academy Awards	Best Director	Barbet Schroeder	Nominated	
Academy Awards	Best Actor	Jeremy Irons	Won	
Academy Awards	Best Screenplay – Based on Material from Another Medium	Nicholas Kazan	Nominated	
Artios Awards	Outstanding Achievement in Feature Film Casting – Drama	Howard Feuer	Nominated	
Boston Society of Film Critics Awards	Best Actor	Jeremy Irons	Won	
Boston Society of Film Critics Awards	Best Screenplay	Nicholas Kazan	Won	
Chicago Film Critics Association Awards	Best Actor	Jeremy Irons	Won	
Dallas-Fort Worth Film Critics Association Awards	Best Film		Nominated	
David di Donatello Awards	Best Foreign Actor	Jeremy Irons	Won	
Golden Globe Awards	Best Motion Picture – Drama		Nominated	
Golden Globe Awards	Best Actor in a Motion Picture – Drama	Jeremy Irons	Won	
Golden Globe Awards	Best Director – Motion Picture	Barbet Schroeder	Nominated	
Golden Globe Awards	Best Screenplay – Motion Picture	Nicholas Kazan	Nominated	
Kansas City Film Critics Circle Awards	Best Actor	Jeremy Irons	Won	
Los Angeles Film Critics Association Awards	Best Actor	Jeremy Irons	Won	
Los Angeles Film Critics Association Awards	Best Screenplay	Nicholas Kazan	Won	
Nastro d'Argento	Best Cinematography	Luciano Tovoli	Nominated	
National Board of Review Awards	Top Ten Films		5th Place	
National Society of Film Critics Awards	Best Film		3rd Place	
National Society of Film Critics Awards	Best Actor	Jeremy Irons	Won	
New York Film Critics Circle Awards	Best Film		Runner-up	
New York Film Critics Circle Awards	Best Director	Barbet Schroeder	Nominated	
New York Film Critics Circle Awards	Best Actor	Jeremy Irons	Runner-up	
PEN Center USA West Literary Awards	Best Screenplay	Nicholas Kazan	Won	
Political Film Society Awards	Exposé		Nominated	
Writers Guild of America Awards	Best Screenplay – Based on Material from Another Medium	Nicholas Kazan	Nominated	

In 2015, the 25th anniversary of Entertainment Weekly named Reversal of Fortune on its list of the 25 best films of the past 25 years.

The film is recognized by American Film Institute in these lists:

- 2003: AFI's 100 Years...100 Heroes and Villains:
  - Claus von Bülow – Nominated Villain
- 2008: AFI's 10 Top 10:
  - Nominated Courtroom Drama Film

== See also ==
- List of films featuring diabetes
