= Heed the Thunder =

1946 novel by Jim Thompson

- First edition
- Author: Jim Thompson
- Language: English
- Genre: Crime fiction
- Publisher: Greenberg
- Publication date: 1946
- Publication place: United States
- Pages: 297

Heed the Thunder is a 1946 American crime novel by Jim Thompson. It was Thompson's second novel.

== Reissue ==
The Canadian Studio Pocket Books reissue was retitled Sins of the Fathers and listed the author as James Thompson.
