= Gianni Silvestri =

Italian production designer and art director (1945–2009)

- Born: 1945; Ponza, Italy
- Died: July 16, 2009 (aged 63–64); Latina, Italy
- Occupations: Production designer; art director
- Years active: 1970s–2005
- Known for: The Last Emperor, The Sheltering Sky, Stealing Beauty
- Awards: BAFTA Award for Best Production Design nomination (1991)

Gianni Silvestri (1945 – 16 July 2009) was an Italian production designer and art director, known for his work on films including The Last Emperor, The Sheltering Sky, and Stealing Beauty. He was nominated for the BAFTA Award for Best Production Design for The Sheltering Sky.

== Early life ==
Silvestri was born in Ponza in 1945 and spent part of his childhood there.

== Career ==
Silvestri worked in film production design and art direction from the 1970s. One of his early international credits was Peter Bogdanovich's Daisy Miller (1974), on which he worked as a set dresser under art director Ferdinando Scarfiotti.

He subsequently worked with Bernardo Bertolucci on several of the director's films in different roles, including The Last Emperor (1987), on which Silvestri served as one of the art directors alongside production designer Ferdinando Scarfiotti, and the Criterion Collection credits him as an art director on the film.

Silvestri was the production designer of Bertolucci's The Sheltering Sky (1990). His work on the film earned him a nomination for the BAFTA Award for Best Production Design at the 44th British Academy Film Awards in 1991.

In 1995, he was credited with art direction on Marco Tullio Giordana's Pasolini: An Italian Crime, which was reviewed at the Venice Film Festival.

He continued his collaboration with Bertolucci as production designer on Stealing Beauty (1996). The American Film Institute credits Silvestri as the film's production designer.

Silvestri again worked with Bertolucci as production designer on Besieged (1998). A contemporary review in the Los Angeles Times credited him as the film's production designer.

In 2005, Silvestri worked on Melissa P., directed by Luca Guadagnino.

== Selected filmography ==
Year	Film	Role
1974	Daisy Miller	Set dresser
1987	The Last Emperor	Art director
1990	The Sheltering Sky	Production designer
1996	Stealing Beauty	Production designer
1998	Besieged	Production designer
2005	Melissa P.	Art direction

== Awards and nominations ==
Year	Award	Category	Work	Result
1991	British Academy Film Awards	Best Production Design	The Sheltering Sky	Nominated

== Death ==
Silvestri died in Latina on 16 July 2009.
