= Now and on Earth =

1942 novel by Jim Thompson

- First edition
- Author: Jim Thompson
- Language: English
- Publisher: Modern Age
- Publication date: 1942
- Publication place: United States
- Media type: Print

Now and On Earth is a 1942 novel by Jim Thompson. It was his first published novel.

== Plot ==
Set in San Diego during World War II, it is a semi-autobiographical novel of the author's life working in an airplane manufacturing plant during the war years and the frustrations he endured there and in his personal life at the time. The main character is named James Dillon, a pen name under which Thompson previously published short stories.
