= Savage Night =

1953 novel by Jim Thompson

- Author: Jim Thompson
- Language: English
- Genre: Crime novel
- Publisher: Lion Books
- Publication date: 1953
- Publication place: United States
- Media type: Print
- Pages: 160 pp

Savage Night is a 1953 novel by the thriller writer Jim Thompson.

== Plot ==
Charles Bigger is small of stature and in bad health, but his youthful career as a hit man was phenomenally successful. He has spent recent years living quietly in Arizona, where the climate is good for his tuberculosis. Summoned back to New York by a mob boss known simply as The Man, Bigger engages to kill Jake Winroy, an ex-bookmaker planning to turn informant against The Man's crime establishment. Traveling under an alias to the small town of Peardale, Bigger is able to move into his intended victim's house as a lodger. Matters become complicated when he enters simultaneous relationships with Winroy's wife Fay and a mistreated housemaid named Ruth.
