= Nothing More Than Murder =

1949 novel by Jim Thompson

- First edition
- Author: Jim Thompson
- Language: English
- Genre: Crime novel
- Publisher: Harper & Brothers
- Publication date: 1949
- Publication place: United States
- Media type: Print

Nothing More Than Murder is a 1949 crime novel by Jim Thompson.

== Plot ==
An unscrupulous owner of a movie theater in a small town, Joe Wilmot, in an unhappy marriage and squeezed by the theater chains, concocts a murderous plot involving his wife and his lover. Wilmot's scheme unravels slowly as he finds out that his predicament was worse than he thought and that his friends and adversaries are more vicious. Also known as Murder at the Bijou.
