= National Board of Review Awards 1990 =

Annual US film awards ceremony

62nd National Board of Review Awards

Best Picture:
Dances with Wolves

The 62nd National Board of Review Awards, honoring the best in filmmaking in 1990, were announced on 16 December 1990 and given on 4 March 1991.

== Top 10 films ==
1. Dances with Wolves
2. Hamlet
3. Goodfellas
4. Awakenings
5. Reversal of Fortune
6. Miller's Crossing
7. Metropolitan
8. Mr. & Mrs. Bridge
9. Avalon
10. The Grifters

== Top Foreign Films ==
1. Cyrano de Bergerac
2. Jesus of Montreal
3. The Nasty Girl
4. Monsieur Hire
5. Tie Me Up! Tie Me Down!

== Winners ==
- Best Picture:
  - Dances with Wolves
- Best Foreign Language Film:
  - Cyrano de Bergerac, France
- Best Actor:
  - Robert De Niro and Robin Williams - Awakenings
- Best Actress:
  - Mia Farrow - Alice
- Best Supporting Actor:
  - Joe Pesci - Goodfellas
- Best Supporting Actress:
  - Winona Ryder - Mermaids
- Best Director:
  - Kevin Costner - Dances with Wolves
- Career Achievement Award
  - James Stewart
