= The Getaway (1994 film) =

American action thriller

- Theatrical release poster
- Directed by: Roger Donaldson
- Screenplay by: Walter Hill; Amy Holden Jones
- Based on: The Getaway (1972 film) by Walter Hill; The Getaway (1958 novel) by Jim Thompson
- Produced by: David Foster; Lawrence Turman; John Alan Simon
- Starring: Alec Baldwin; Kim Basinger; Michael Madsen; Jennifer Tilly; Richard Farnsworth; James Woods
- Cinematography: Peter Menzies Jr.
- Edited by: Conrad Buff
- Music by: Mark Isham
- Production companies: Largo Entertainment; JVC Entertainment; The Turman/Foster Company
- Distributed by: Universal Pictures (North America); Largo International (international)
- Release date: February 11, 1994
- Running time: 116 minutes
- Country: United States
- Language: English
- Budget: $37 million
- Box office: $30 million

The Getaway is a 1994 American action thriller film directed by Roger Donaldson, and starring Alec Baldwin, Kim Basinger, Michael Madsen, James Woods and Jennifer Tilly. It is a remake of Sam Peckinpah's 1972 film, in turn based on the 1958 novel written by Jim Thompson. The screenplay was written by Walter Hill (who also wrote the 1972 film) and Amy Holden Jones.

The film was released by Universal Pictures on February 11, 1994. It received generally poor reviews and flopped at the box office, but later enjoyed lucrative success in the home video market.

== Plot ==
Carter "Doc" McCoy and his wife Carol are taking target practice with pistols when Rudy Travis arrives to propose they break Mexican drug lord Ramon's nephew Luis Mendoza out of jail for a $300,000 payment. The job is successful, but it turns out Ramon wanted Luis free to kill him. Rudy is waiting with a getaway plane, but he sees police cars and leaves Doc behind.

After a year in a Mexican jail, Doc sends Carol to mob boss Jack Benyon, who is looking to put together a select team of experts to rob a dog track in Arizona. Benyon agrees to get Doc released from prison, in exchange for sexual favors from Carol. Doc gets out and meets the men Benyon has hired. One is Rudy, along with Frank Hansen, who seems inexperienced. Rudy extends a hand and says "No hard feelings" but is punched by Doc and warned not to double-cross him again. At the track, while Doc is breaking into the vault, a guard pulls a gun and is shot by Hansen in a panic. The thieves escape by creating a diversion with a bomb under a gas truck and leave with the cash, totaling over one million dollars. The plan was for Doc and Carol to meet Rudy and Hansen later to split the money. On the road, Rudy kills Hansen and pushes him out of the car.

Doc arrives at the rendezvous point, where Rudy again pulls a gun. Doc expected this and is ready with his own weapon, shooting Rudy and leaving him for dead. Doc and Carol drive off with all the money, unaware that Rudy was wearing a bulletproof vest. A wounded Rudy drives to a local clinic, where he holds veterinarian Harold Carvey and his wife Fran hostage, forces them to treat his wounds and drive him to El Paso. An attraction develops between Rudy and Fran and they taunt her meek husband. At a motel, Rudy has sex with Fran after tying Harold to a chair. Hearing Fran's moans and her laughter at him, a heart-broken Harold commits suicide by hanging himself. Fran barely looks back as she accompanies Rudy to El Paso.

Doc and Carol go to Benyon's house with the money. Benyon drops broad hints about what Carol did to get Doc out of jail. Carol approaches with a gun, unseen by Doc as he counts the money. Benyon clearly expects her to shoot Doc, but she kills him instead. Doc is upset, but Carol says she did what she had to do to help Doc and assumes he would have done the same if their situations were reversed. There continues to be tension between the pair, particularly when Carol loses the money to a con man at a train station in Flagstaff. Doc has to board the train, find the man and subdue him to retrieve the money.

Doc and Carol proceed to the rustic Border Hotel in El Paso, owned by Doc's friend Gollie, to get new passports and identities so they can escape to Mexico. Rudy is already there waiting with Fran. Benyon's men, led by Jim Deer Jackson want the money and arrive in El Paso. Rudy sets a trap and Doc is startled to see him alive. He knocks out Rudy but resists killing him in cold blood. A long and bloody gunfight ensues with Doc and Carol shooting it out with Benyon's men in the halls and stairwells of the hotel.

Rudy comes to his senses just as the last of Benyon's men die. He makes one more attempt to get the money, but after a hand-to-hand fight, he is killed by Doc in an elevator when the latter shoots the cables, sending the elevator plummeting down to ground level, where his body is discovered by a screaming Fran. Doc and Carol make their way out of the hotel just as the police arrive, and hijack a pickup truck driven by "Slim", an old cowboy, forcing him to drive them to the border. After safely crossing into Mexico, they buy Slim's truck from him and drive southward, making their getaway.

== Cast ==
- Alec Baldwin as Carter "Doc" McCoy
- Kim Basinger as Carol McCoy
- Michael Madsen as Rudy Travis
- Jennifer Tilly as Fran Carvey
- Richard Farnsworth as Slim
- Burton Gilliam as Gollie
- Philip Hoffman as Frank Hansen
- James Woods as Jack Benyon
- David Morse as Jim Deer Jackson
- James Stephens as Dr. Harold Carvey
- Royce D. Applegate as Gun Salesman
- Daniel Villarreal as Luis Mendoza
- Scott McKenna as Red Shirt
- Alex Colon as Ramon

== Production ==
=== Development and writing ===
The screenplay for the 1972 version of The Getaway was written by Walter Hill. In 1990, Hill's wife, Hildy Gottlieb, had left her job as an agent to head up Alec Baldwin's production company, Meadowbrook Productions. Hill and Baldwin were friendly – at one stage they were going to make The Fugitive together before being replaced by Andrew Davis and Harrison Ford. According to Baldwin, Hill always wanted to film his original script of The Getaway before it had been changed by Sam Peckinpah. Hill was going to direct with Baldwin starring, then, according to Baldwin, "they got into a hassle about the budget and Walter split to go do Geronimo, and he gave everybody his blessing to go do it without him."

Producer David Foster approached Roger Donaldson to direct in Hill's place. Donaldson originally said no as he did not want to do a remake. Then he read the script "and I really liked it," said Donaldson. "And then I rented the original movie, which I'd never seen, and I liked that, too. I saw how I could put my own stamp on it. There were lots of things about it that appealed to me: I love the Southwest, I love the genre of the road movie, I love a thriller and I like the sort of underlying conflicts of the relationships in that movie."

Baldwin said he "always wanted to do a movie that required what I consider to be movie acting, which is that it's not what you do, but what you don't do. It's all about small, and less and less. An action film is a perfect opportunity for that. There's always a steady flow of action films – it's the most mined material – but what distinguishes an action movie is the acting."

Alec Baldwin and Kim Basinger had fallen in love while making The Marrying Man together and he asked her to play the female role Carol McCoy. Basinger said she "loved" the original movie "a lot. It had this cult status. But my first reaction to Alec's suggestion was no." She went back to the original Jim Thompson novel to see if there was a more substantial theme to the story.

I saw that this theme could be summed up in one word – trust.... And I said to Alec, "See what we have here. This is all about trust. These two people can't trust anybody or anything. They can't trust their colleagues. They seemingly can't trust each other. And when mistrust occurs, it breeds violence and havoc."

Basinger says her views were incorporated into rewrites of the script by Amy Jones. She liked them and accepted the role. Basinger:

There's something going on between us here that was never developed between Steve McQueen and Ali McGraw [sic]. The movie asks all sorts of questions about our relationship. I'd said to Alec that if we did this together, I wanted it to be more of a partnership movie than the first. I wanted to see where that aspect went, with the movie being more about the relationship and the violence running second – although there's plenty of that in the movie... Let's not kid ourselves. This movie is made for a commercial audience. It's a very difficult question for me because I don't like violence. But at the same time, how else are we going to make a film that faithfully mirrors the truth out there in our society? This is a story about misfits in a world of misfits. It's a story about trust and mistrust and how mistrust breeds violence.

Baldwin and Basinger were collectively paid $4 million to star in the film together.

=== Filming ===
The film was shot in Yuma, Phoenix, and The Apache Lodge in Prescott, Arizona. The location portrayed as the Border Hotel in El Paso is the Hotel Del Sol (formerly Hotel Del Ming) in Yuma. It was filmed in the spring of 1993 and was originally set to be released in December of that year.

The film included a torrid sex scene between Baldwin and Basinger. Director Donaldson said:

These scenes are always the toughest of any scenes to do.... People get into acting not to be exhibitionists, necessarily. They get into it because they love acting. And then you're basically trying to convince them that this part of the story is essential.... Basically my philosophy of how to do these scenes is to give the actors as much freedom and privacy as you can possibly bring to it, and let them feel that ultimately you won't compromise them. That you won't make them look stupid or expose more of themselves than they would perhaps like to see. It has to be relevant to the movie and be tasteful.

"Although we were co-stars we knew we had to forget we were married in real life," Basinger said. "We each had a separate relationship with the director. There was none of this let's go home and talk about it under the sheets and gang up on him the next day... I can't begin to tell you how well the working experience turned out."

Jennifer Tilly said she loved doing the nude scene with Michael Madsen: "At first, it was scary, but you know there's something very freeing about taking your clothes off in front of 50 people."

== Reception ==
=== Critical response ===
The film garnered negative reviews from critics. It has an approval rating of 33% on Rotten Tomatoes based on 24 reviews, with a weighted average of 4.9/10. Kim Basinger earned nominations for the Golden Raspberry Award for Worst Actress at the 15th Golden Raspberry Awards and the Stinkers Bad Movie Award at the 1994 Stinkers Bad Movie Awards, but she lost both trophies to Sharon Stone for Intersection and The Specialist. Baldwin later referred to the film as "a bomb".

In retrospect, Michael Madsen was very proud of the film: "It was a pretty good movie. I don’t think it was really released right. I think it should’ve been a wider release. I think they should’ve left it out a little bit longer."

=== Year-end lists ===
- Honorable mention – David Elliott, The San Diego Union-Tribune
- Honorable mention – Michael MacCambridge, Austin American-Statesman
