= The Grifters (film) =

1990 film by Stephen Frears

- Theatrical release poster
- Directed by: Stephen Frears
- Screenplay by: Donald E. Westlake
- Based on: The Grifters by Jim Thompson
- Produced by: Martin Scorsese; Robert A. Harris; Jim Painten
- Starring: John Cusack; Anjelica Huston; Annette Bening
- Cinematography: Oliver Stapleton
- Edited by: Mick Audsley
- Music by: Elmer Bernstein
- Production company: Cineplex Odeon Films
- Distributed by: Miramax Films
- Release dates: September 14, 1990 (TIFF); December 5, 1990 (United States)
- Running time: 110 minutes
- Country: United States
- Language: English
- Box office: $13.4 million

The Grifters is a 1990 American neo-noir crime thriller film directed by Stephen Frears, produced by Martin Scorsese, and starring John Cusack, Anjelica Huston, and Annette Bening. The film follows a lifelong con artist (Huston) who reunites with her estranged son (Cusack) and, along with his girlfriend (Bening), becomes embroiled in a complex web of criminal activity. The screenplay by Donald E. Westlake was adapted from Jim Thompson's 1963 novel.

The Grifters premiered at the Toronto International Film Festival on September 14, 1990, and was released by Miramax Films in the United States on December 5, 1990. Huston and Bening both received Academy Award nominations for their performances in the film, while Huston also garnered a Golden Globe Award nomination, and Bening, a BAFTA Award nomination. Frears received an Academy Award nomination for Best Director, and Westlake for Best Adapted Screenplay. The film won the Independent Spirit Award for Best Film and was named one of the Top 10 films of 1990 by the National Board of Review.

== Plot ==
Lilly Dillon is a veteran con artist. She works for Bobo Justus, a mob bookmaker, making large cash bets at race tracks to lower the odds of longshots. On her way to La Jolla for a race, Lilly stops in Los Angeles to visit her son, Roy, a small-time hustler she has not seen in eight years. She finds him in pain and bleeding internally after being caught pulling a petty scam and beaten by one of his marks. When medical assistance arrives, Lilly threatens to have the doctor killed by Bobo if her son dies.

At the hospital, Lilly meets and takes an instant dislike to Roy's girlfriend, Myra Langtry, who is slightly older than him. Lilly urges Roy to quit the grifting life, as his con nearly got him killed. Because she leaves late for La Jolla, she misses a race where the winner pays 70 to 1. For this, Bobo punches Lilly and insinuates he will beat her with oranges wrapped in a towel, causing permanent internal damage, but he burns her hand with a cigar instead. Myra, like Roy and Lilly, is also a con artist, often using her sexuality as a means of getting what she wants, including paying her landlord with sex.

Upon leaving the hospital, Roy takes Myra to La Jolla for the weekend. On the train, Myra eyes him conning a group of sailors in a rigged dice game. Myra reveals to Roy that she is also a grifter and is looking for a new partner in a long con. She describes her association with Cole, her old partner, and how they took advantage of wealthy marks in business cons. Roy, who insists on working only short-term cons, resists the proposition, fearing Myra may try to dupe him. Seeing Lilly's power over Roy, Myra accuses him of having an incestuous interest in her. Infuriated, Roy breaks off their relationship. Thirsty for revenge, Myra finds out Lilly has been skimming the proceeds from Bobo over the years and stashing the money in the trunk of her car. Myra leaks this information to Bobo, and Lilly is warned by a friend and flees. Myra follows her to a remote motel, intending to kill her and steal the money for herself. She gains entry to Lilly's room and strangles her in her sleep.

Later, Roy is called by the Phoenix police to identify a body believed to be Lilly's, found in the motel room with her face disfigured by a gunshot wound. Though he tells them it is Lilly, Roy notices the body lacks the cigar burn that he had noticed earlier. He returns home to find Lilly has broken in to steal his money. Lilly reveals she shot Myra in self-defense at the motel while Myra was trying to strangle her. She arranged the scene so it would appear as though Myra's body was hers and that she had committed suicide. When Roy refuses to let Lilly take his money, she desperately pleads with, then attempts to seduce him, even claiming that he is not really her son. Roy, disgusted, rejects her, causing Lilly to angrily swing a briefcase at Roy just as he is taking a drink of water, shattering the glass and sending shards into his neck, which cause him to bleed to death. Sobbing over him, Lilly gathers the money into the briefcase, but by the time she boards the elevator she is completely calm and showing no emotion. Lilly leaves the hotel and disappears into the night.

== Cast ==
- John Cusack as Roy Dillon
- Anjelica Huston as Lilly Dillon
- Annette Bening as Myra Langtry
- Pat Hingle as Bobo Justus
- J. T. Walsh as Cole
- Charles Napier as Gloucester Hebbing
- Henry Jones as Mr. Simms
- Gailard Sartain as Joe
- Noelle Harling as Nurse Carol Flynn
- Paul Adelstein as Sailor - Young Paul
- Jeremy Piven as Sailor - Freshman
- Stephen Tobolowsky as The Jeweler
- Xander Berkeley as Lieutenant Pierson
- Frances Bay as Motel Clerk
- Sandy Baron as The Doctor
- Eddie Jones as Mintz

== Production ==
=== Development ===
The project originated with Robert Harris, Jim Painten and Bruce Kawin, who brought it to Martin Scorsese. Martin Scorsese subsequently brought in Stephen Frears to direct while he produced. Frears had just finished making Dangerous Liaisons (1988) and was looking for another project when Scorsese approached him. The British filmmaker was drawn to Thompson's "tough and very stylistic" writing and described it "as if pulp fiction meets Greek tragedy". Scorsese looked for a screenwriter, and filmmaker Volker Schlöndorff recommended Donald Westlake.

Frears contacted Westlake who agreed to re-read the Thompson novel but, after doing so, turned the project down, citing the story as "too gloomy". Frears then phoned Westlake and convinced him that he saw the story as a positive one if considered as a story of Lilly's drive to survive. Westlake changed his mind and agreed to write the adaptation. Frears was unsuccessful, however, at convincing Westlake to write the script under his pseudonym "Richard Stark", a name he had used to write 20 noir-influenced crime novels from 1962 through 1974. Westlake said: "I got out of that one by explaining Richard Stark wasn't a member of the Writer's Guild. I don't think he's a joiner, actually". (Stark's name appears in the film, though, on a sign reading "Stark, Coe and Fellows"; Westlake explains in the film's commentary track that he has written novels as Richard Stark, Tucker Coe and "some other fellows".)

=== Casting ===
John Cusack had read Jim Thompson's novel in 1985 and was so impressed by it that he wanted to turn the book into a film himself. When Cusack found out that Scorsese and Frears were planning an adaptation, he actively pursued a role in the project. Cusack has said that he saw the character of Roy Dillon as "a wonderfully twisted role to dive into". To research his role, he studied with actual real-life grifters and learned card and dice tricks, as well as sleight-of-hand tricks, including the $20 switch that his character performs in the film. He succeeded using this trick at a bar, while practicing on a bartender he knew well.

For the role of Lilly, Frears originally considered Cher, but she became too expensive after the success of Moonstruck. Sissy Spacek also read the part of Lilly Dillon.

Frears first contacted Anjelica Huston about playing Lilly in 1989 while she was filming Crimes and Misdemeanors, but after reading the script, she was unsure. Although she was "transfixed" by the story and the character, a scene in the script where Lilly is beaten so violently by Bobo Justus with a sack of oranges that she defecates alarmed Huston with its explicitness. A few months later, Frears contacted Huston again to see if she was still interested. Still wavering, Huston's talent agent Sue Mengers told her bluntly: "Anjelica, if Stephen Frears tells you he wants you to shit in the corner, then that's what you must do". The next day Huston auditioned for the role in front of Frears at the Chateau Marmont. Frears' initial reluctance to cast Huston, because she looked too much like "a lady", was resolved with the decision to cheapen her look with a bleached blond wig and "vulgar clothes". To research her part, she studied women dealers at card parlors in Los Angeles County, California.

Steve Buscemi was cast in an undisclosed role, but his scenes were ultimately cut from the film.

=== Filming ===
Principal photography of The Grifters began on October 23, 1989, with filming primarily occurring in Los Angeles. Locations included the Bryson Apartment Hotel. Additional filming took place over a three day-period in Phoenix, Arizona.

The shoot was emotionally challenging for Huston. After completing the final scene between Lilly and Roy, she was so drained from the experience that she ran from the set and the studio. It took her hours to recover. After shooting the scene where Bobo Justus tortures Lilly for betraying him, Huston was so affected by the rough quality of the scene (which did not make the final cut of the film) that she spent that night throwing up.

Annette Bening explained that she accepted being full frontally nude in this film because she felt the scenes were comedic rather than dramatic. "I thought I could do them because of the context it was in. It made sense to me. It was appropriate to the part, it wasn't exploitative", she said.

== Release ==
The Grifters had its world premiere on September 14, 1990 at the Toronto Festival of Festivals at the Elgin Theater. The film had a brief Academy Award-qualifying run in New York City and Los Angeles on December 5, 1990, before opening wide in January 1991.

=== Home media ===
The film was released on LaserDisc in 1991. The film was released on DVD as part of the Miramax Collector's Series on September 24, 2002. The Criterion Collection issued the film in 4K UHD Blu-ray and Blu-ray formats on January 21, 2025.

== Reception ==
=== Box office ===
The film was successful in its limited run, grossing $13.4 million.

=== Critical response ===
For The New Yorker, Pauline Kael wrote that the film retained Thompson's "hardboiled pitilessness, and a tension is created by placing these fifties or early sixties characters in nineties L.A. locations". She went on to write: "The movie starts with comic capers, then uses Thompson's class resentment and grim hopelessness to smack us with discord. We're watching a form of cabaret". Kael lauded Huston's performance, saying: "Huston is willing to be taken as monstrous; she contains this possibility as part of what she is. And when Lilly shows her willingness to do anything to survive she's a great character".

The film received positive reviews from critics. On Rotten Tomatoes, it holds a 92% rating based on 49 reviews. The site's consensus reads: "Coolly collected and confidently performed, The Grifters is a stylish caper that puts the artistry in con".

Roger Ebert of the Chicago Sun-Times gave The Grifters four stars out of four, praising the lead performances and the script, which he thought accurately captured the essence of film noir better than any in recent memory. He wrote: "This is a movie of plot, not episode. It's not just a series of things that happen to the characters, but a web, a maze of consequences".

=== Accolades ===
Award	Category	Nominee(s)	Result	Ref.
Academy Awards	Best Director	Stephen Frears	Nominated	
Academy Awards	Best Actress	Anjelica Huston	Nominated	
Academy Awards	Best Supporting Actress	Annette Bening	Nominated	
Academy Awards	Best Screenplay – Based on Material from Another Medium	Donald E. Westlake	Nominated	
Artios Awards	Outstanding Achievement in Feature Film Casting – Drama	Juliet Taylor	Nominated	
Boston Society of Film Critics Awards	Best Actress	Anjelica Huston	Won	
British Academy Film Awards	Best Actress in a Supporting Role	Annette Bening	Nominated	
Chicago Film Critics Association Awards	Best Actress	Anjelica Huston	Nominated	
Dallas–Fort Worth Film Critics Association Awards	Best Picture		Nominated	
Dallas–Fort Worth Film Critics Association Awards	Best Director	Stephen Frears	Nominated	
Dallas–Fort Worth Film Critics Association Awards	Best Actress	Anjelica Huston	Nominated	
Dallas–Fort Worth Film Critics Association Awards	Best Supporting Actress	Annette Bening	Nominated	
Edgar Allan Poe Awards	Best Motion Picture	Donald E. Westlake	Won	
Golden Globe Awards	Best Actress in a Motion Picture – Drama	Anjelica Huston	Nominated	
Independent Spirit Awards	Best Feature		Won	
Independent Spirit Awards	Best Female Lead	Anjelica Huston	Won	
London Film Critics' Circle Awards	Newcomer of the Year	Annette Bening	Won	
Los Angeles Film Critics Association Awards	Best Actress	Anjelica Huston	Won	
National Board of Review Awards	Top Ten Films		10th Place	
National Society of Film Critics Awards	Best Film		2nd Place	
National Society of Film Critics Awards	Best Director	Stephen Frears	2nd Place	
National Society of Film Critics Awards	Best Actress	Anjelica Huston	Won	
National Society of Film Critics Awards	Best Supporting Actress	Annette Bening	Won	
National Society of Film Critics Awards	Best Screenplay	Donald E. Westlake	3rd Place	
New York Film Critics Circle Awards	Best Film		Runner-up	
New York Film Critics Circle Awards	Best Actress	Anjelica Huston	Runner-up	
Writers Guild of America Awards	Best Screenplay – Based on Material from Another Medium	Donald E. Westlake	Nominated	
