= A Hell of a Woman =

1954 novel by Jim Thompson

- First edition
- Author: Jim Thompson
- Language: English
- Publisher: Lion Books
- Publication date: 1954
- Publication place: United States
- Media type: Print
- Pages: 208 pp

A Hell of a Woman is a 1954 novel by Jim Thompson. It has been adapted for the screen by Alain Corneau and Georges Pérec as Série noire, released in 1979.

== Plot ==
Frank "Dolly" Dillon hates his job of working collections for Pay-E-Zee Stores. He loathes his wife, Joyce, and has an account balance that barely lets him pay the bills each month.

Working door-to-door one day, Dolly crosses paths with a beautiful young woman, Mona, who is being forced by her aunt to do things that she does not want to with men she does not know. Mona wants out any way that she can. Mona and Dolly soon become tangled in a deadly, sanity-threatening scheme.
