= The Alcoholics =

1953 novel by Jim Thompson

- First edition
- Author: Jim Thompson
- Language: English
- Publisher: Lion Books
- Publication date: 1953
- Publication place: United States
- Media type: Print

The Alcoholics is a 1953 novel by Jim Thompson.

The novel was re-released in the 1980s along with several other Thompson books under the Black Lizard imprint, by the Creative Arts Book Company.

== Plot ==
The story revolves around Dr. Peter S. Murphy and his clinic El Healtho where he treats alcoholics.
