= 1990 Los Angeles Film Critics Association Awards =

1990 film awards

16th LAFCA Awards
- Date: December 16, 1990

Highlights
- Best Picture: Goodfellas

The 16th Los Angeles Film Critics Association Awards were announced on 16 December 1990 and given on 16 January 1991.

== Winners ==
- Best Picture:
  - Goodfellas
  - Runner-up: Dances with Wolves
- Best Director:
  - Martin Scorsese – Goodfellas
  - Runner-up: Kevin Costner – Dances with Wolves
- Best Actor:
  - Jeremy Irons – Reversal of Fortune
  - Runner-up: Philippe Noiret – Life and Nothing But (La vie et rien d'autre)
- Best Actress:
  - Anjelica Huston – The Grifters and The Witches
  - Runner-up: Joanne Woodward – Mr. & Mrs. Bridge
- Best Supporting Actor:
  - Joe Pesci – Goodfellas
  - Runner-up: Bruce Davison – Longtime Companion
- Best Supporting Actress:
  - Lorraine Bracco – Goodfellas
  - Runner-up: Dianne Wiest – Edward Scissorhands
- Best Screenplay:
  - Nicholas Kazan – Reversal of Fortune
  - Runner-up: Charles Burnett – To Sleep with Anger
- Best Cinematography:
  - Michael Ballhaus – Goodfellas
  - Runner-up: Vittorio Storaro – The Sheltering Sky
- Best Music Score:
  - Richard Horowitz and Ryuichi Sakamoto – The Sheltering Sky
  - Runner-up: Randy Newman – Avalon
- Best Foreign Film:
  - Life and Nothing But (La vie et rien d'autre) • France
  - Runner-up: Cyrano de Bergerac • France
- Best Non-Fiction Film (tie):
  - Paris Is Burning
  - Pictures of the Old World (Obrazy starého sveta)
- Best Animation:
  - The Rescuers Down Under
- Experimental/Independent Film/Video Award:
  - Marlon Riggs – Tongues Untied
- New Generation Award:
  - Jane Campion
- Career Achievement Award (tie):
  - Blake Edwards
  - Chuck Jones
- Special Citation:
  - Charles Burnett
