= Série noire (film) =

1979 French neo-noir dark comedy psychological crime thriller film

- Film poster
- Directed by: Alain Corneau
- Written by: Alain Corneau; Georges Perec; Jim Thompson
- Produced by: Maurice Bernart
- Starring: Patrick Dewaere; Myriam Boyer; Marie Trintignant; Bernard Blier
- Cinematography: Pierre-William Glenn
- Edited by: Thierry Derocles
- Music by: Gérard Lenorman
- Distributed by: Gaumont Distribution
- Release date: 25 April 1979
- Running time: 111 minutes
- Country: France
- Language: French
- Budget: FRF 2 million (€300,000)
- Box office: 890,578 admissions (France) $5,633 (US).

Série Noire is a 1979 French neo-noir dark comedy psychological crime thriller film directed by Alain Corneau, based on the novel A Hell of a Woman by Jim Thompson. It stars Patrick Dewaere, Marie Trintignant and Bernard Blier. It tells the story of an inadequate young man whose relationship with his wife has deteriorated and who falls for a teenage prostitute. To win the girl's heart, he commits robbery and murders. The film was entered for the 1979 Cannes Film Festival.

== Plot ==
In the outskirts of Paris, Franck Poupart sells goods door to door on commission, returning to a rundown apartment and a depressed wife. Franck often drinks excessively and suffers from frequent mood swings and other symptoms of withdrawal. Looking for a man called Tikides who owes him money, he calls on the decrepit house of an old woman, who says he will find the man at the gym and agrees to buy a dressing gown. In return he can have sex with Mona, her underage niece, who leads him to her room and undresses. Though struck by the girl, Franck manages to restrain himself and leave.

Going home, he falls into another argument with his wife, in which he pushes her dressed into the bath full of water, and she leaves. His boss, aware that Franck has been cheating him for some time, has him arrested and held at the police station. Freed next day when a young woman pays the debt in full, he discovers it was not his wife but Mona. Going round to thank her, he asks where she got the money and she says she took it from her aunt's hidden cash hoard.

When he suggests to Mona that the two of them could lift the hoard and disappear together, she agrees but warns him that the aunt also has a hidden pistol. He then enlists Tikides as his accomplice, telling him to wait in the car while he deals with the aunt. After killing her and finding the pistol, he calls Tikides in and shoots him dead. Leaving Mona to explain to the police that the intruder killed the old woman who had wounded him fatally, Franck goes home with the money.

There he finds his wife has returned, pregnant and eager to start afresh. When she finds the money and reads about the case in the newspapers, she accuses Franck. To silence her, he kills her. His boss then comes round, also having concluded that Franck is the culprit, and demands all the loot. By now Franck has stopped caring and hands it over. In the street outside Mona is waiting: she is all he has left.

== Cast ==
- Patrick Dewaere as Franck Poupart
- Myriam Boyer as Jeanne, his wife
- Marie Trintignant as Mona
- Bernard Blier as Staplin
- Jeanne Herviale as Mona's aunt
- Andreas Katsulas as Andreas Tikides

== Production ==
=== Pre-production ===
In 1978, Alain Corneau gained recognition with his feature films Police Python 357 and La Menace. For his next film, the director wished to shoot a film in the realistic vein of Martin Scorsese's Mean Streets without music but containing the hits of the time, in real settings. Corneau originally intended to collaborate with author Jim Thompson to adapt one of his novels, Pop 1280, but the project was aborted. Finally, the director focused on another Thompson novel, A Hell of a Woman, and wrote the script in collaboration with Georges Perec. Adapting Thompson's novel for the big screen posed many problems for Corneau and Perec, because the two men had to reduce the imposing story of the novelist for a cinematographic treatment, then set about writing a story adapted to the French way of life.

For the character of Frank Poupart, Corneau wanted Patrick Dewaere, even if it meant giving up filming it if the actor refused. The two men met in a bistro to talk about the project. Dewaere then threw himself on the script, of which he obtained three versions, and contacted Corneau the same evening to tell him that he absolutely wanted the role, that it was indeed the project that the actor had been waiting for. During the weeks preceding filming, the actor never stopped talking about the film and its role, either to those around him or to journalists. He was so obsessed with the film and his character that he stole a gray raincoat from Tati de Barbès while he was walking in the famous Parisian district, thinking that it would be perfect for the character. The actor did not hesitate to use his deepest suffering to give life to the character, thus interweaving reality and fiction. His dedication even saw him losing ten kilos in a few weeks.

The role of the enigmatic and taciturn Mona was entrusted to the young Marie Trintignant, whose cinematographic experience had been limited to participation in films made by her mother, Nadine, who was Corneau's partner. The role of Poupart's wife was played by Myriam Boyer, with whom Dewaere got along very well and whose companion John Berry had played Dewaere's father in F ... Comme Fairbanks. Bernard Blier, chosen to play Frank's boss, was very eager to work with Dewaere, who had appeared in two films directed by his son, Bertrand, who had become a longtime friend of Dewaere, and who shared the same state of mind as his elder friend.

=== Filming ===
Série noire was filmed in six weeks with a budget of FRF 2 million. The film was shot mainly in Saint-Maur-des-Fossés and Créteil. Myriam Boyer described the films budget as “thin”, with a very small production team. Being attentive to Dewaere's remarks, Corneau abandoned the idea of improvisation, but wanted spontaneous scenarios, filmed on the spot. He innovated by shooting with two or three cameras with very little lighting (the chief operator Pierre-William Glenn used more sensitive film than normal) and took few shots. In addition, sound was recorded live with wireless high frequency microphones worn by the actors.

The atmosphere on the shoot was intense; Dewaere really bangs his head on the hood of a car during the scene where his character hits his head on his vehicle. Dewaere asked the director to be ready to shoot this scene, shot in a vacant lot one morning when it was minus fifteen degrees, wanting to avoid retakes, and refused a stuntman. The actor had been using drugs but remained perfectly lucid during all of the shooting, and recited his lines to perfection. Dewaere took care of Marie Trintignant, being attentive and protective of the young actress then aged 16. The actress said that in this film, "I have the impression that we all threw ourselves into the scenes, into the elements, like animals ... It was a violent film. Everything was violent!". After a strong sequence where Dewaere's character beats Boyer's, the actor revealed to his partner that he had the impression of hitting his mother (Mado), as if to settle his accounts with her.

The scene where Frank strangled and killed Jeanne in a violent manner was extremely hard to film. After filming it, Dewaere returned home in a daze and told friends who asked him what was wrong, "but do you realize that today I killed someone? It is not nothing to kill someone". Having a deep respect for Bernard Blier, Dewaere dares not slap him in the face for the final scene, but Blier insisted, forcing Dewaere to slap him for real.

In Projection privée, Alain Corneau talked about the shooting of the nude scene with Marie Trintignant: "I don't hide anything from her about the violence of the film and the hardness of the shooting, and I describe to her the scene where she opens her pink blouse, takes it off and gets completely naked in front of Patrick Dewaere. Marie will be marked by this film, especially by her nude scene in the bedroom. She will have trouble with nudity afterwards: is that where it comes from? Possibly, I don't deny this possible responsibility".

== Reception ==
Released in French theaters on 25 April 1979 with a ban on under 18s, by 31 December 1979 the film had recorded 847,651 admissions, ranking it in 41st place in the annual box office.
