= A Swell-Looking Babe =

1954 novel by Jim Thompson

- First edition
- Author: Jim Thompson
- Language: English
- Genre: Crime fiction
- Publisher: Lion Books
- Publication date: 1954
- Publication place: United States

A Swell-Looking Babe is an American crime novel by Jim Thompson.

== Plot ==
Dusty, a bellboy looking to raise enough money for medical school, falls for the wrong woman.

== Film adaptation ==
A Swell-Looking Babe was adapted into the 1996 film Hit Me starring Elias Koteas as the bellboy, who is renamed "Sonny" in the film adaptation.
