= Bad Boy (1953 book) =

1953 autobiography by Jim Thompson

Bad Boys
- First edition
- Author: Jim Thompson
- Language: English
- Publisher: Lion Books
- Publication date: 1953
- Publication place: United States
- Media type: Print

Bad Boy is a 1953 autobiography by Jim Thompson, an American crime novelist. It covers his life during his youth in Texas and Oklahoma.

Thompson's autobiography continues in the release of his book Roughneck (1954).
