= The Criminal (novel) =

1953 American crime novel

- First edition
- Author: Jim Thompson
- Language: English
- Genre: Crime fiction
- Publisher: Lion Books
- Publication date: 1953
- Publication place: United States

The Criminal is a 1953 novel by Jim Thompson.

== Plot ==
Everyone in Kenton Hills knows that short-tempered, tongue-tied Bob Talbert wasn't the one responsible for the brutal crime that ended Josie Eddleman's life. Never mind that he was the last one to see her alive.

But in a town filled with the likes of an amoral tabloid reporter known only as The Captain, a district attorney who'll do anything for a confession, and Bob's parents, who care as little for Bob as they do for each other, guilt and innocence are little more than a matter of perspective.
