= 1990 National Society of Film Critics Awards =

Annual US film awards ceremony

25th NSFC Awards

January 6, 1991

Best Film:
Goodfellas

The 25th National Society of Film Critics Awards, given on 6 January 1991, honored the best filmmaking of 1990.

== Winners ==
=== Best Picture ===
1. Goodfellas
2. The Grifters
3. Reversal of Fortune
4. Sweetie

=== Best Director ===
1. Martin Scorsese – Goodfellas
2. Stephen Frears – The Grifters
3. Jane Campion – Sweetie

=== Best Actor ===
1. Jeremy Irons – Reversal of Fortune
2. Danny Glover – To Sleep with Anger
3. Robert De Niro – Goodfellas and Awakenings

=== Best Actress ===
1. Anjelica Huston – The Grifters and The Witches
2. Joanne Woodward – Mr. & Mrs. Bridge
3. Jessica Lange – Men Don't Leave
3. Debra Winger – The Sheltering Sky and Everybody Wins

=== Best Supporting Actor ===
1. Bruce Davison – Longtime Companion
2. Joe Pesci – Goodfellas
3. Al Pacino – Dick Tracy
3. John Turturro – Miller's Crossing

=== Best Supporting Actress ===
1. Annette Bening – The Grifters
2. Uma Thurman – Henry & June and Where the Heart Is
3. Dianne Wiest – Edward Scissorhands

=== Best Screenplay ===
1. Charles Burnett – To Sleep with Anger
2. Tom Stoppard – The Russia House
3. Donald E. Westlake – The Grifters

=== Best Cinematography ===
1. Peter Suschitzky – Where the Heart Is
2. Ian Baker – The Russia House
3. Philippe Rousselot – Henry & June

=== Best Foreign Language Film ===
1. Ariel
2. Life and Nothing But (La vie et rien d'autre)
3. May Fools (Milou en mai)

=== Best Documentary ===
1. Berkeley in the Sixties
2. For All Mankind
3. The Big Bang

=== Special Citation ===
- Renée Furst
- Jean-Luc Godard
