= The Golden Gizmo =

1954 novel by Jim Thompson

- Cover of the first edition
- Author: Jim Thompson
- Language: English
- Genre: Crime novel
- Publisher: Lion Books
- Publication date: 1954
- Publication place: United States
- Media type: Print
- Pages: 160 pp (first edition, paperback)

The Golden Gizmo is a 1954 novel by the thriller writer Jim Thompson.

== Plot ==
Toddy Kent, a former con-artist with a rap sheet in a dozen cities is now working as a door to door gold-buyer in Los Angeles for Milt Vonderheim's jewelry shop. Despite his disreputable line of work, he is able to keep a low profile in fear of the police digging into his criminal past. He lives in a hotel with his wife Elaine. Elaine spends most of Toddy's money on booze, and is a regular in the drunk tank. Their relationship is toxic but Toddy can't bring himself to leave Elaine, despite his friends urging him to. Milt has been a fatherly figure and a good friend to Toddy and Elaine.

Toddy conceptualizes he has carried a "gizmo," a G.I. term for an unidentifiable, most of his life that time and again brings him the big break most men would kill for, only for it to slip through his fingers.

At the outset of the story, Toddy is working and despite wanting to quit for the day, he calls on the last house in the neighborhood. A man named Alvarado, whom Toddy will refer to as "Chinless," answers the door with his massive dobermann which seems to be able to speak English. Toddy has a bad feeling about the man, who invites him in, and although he wants to excuse himself he steps inside. In the living room Toddy spots a heavy gold watch on the table, and is introduced to Alvarado's beautiful companion Dolores Chavez. Paralyzed by fear of the dobermann, Toddy nervously attempts to explain the meaning of his visit. He opens the box he carries to show Alvarado his haul for the day. To demonstrate that he buys gold he picks the watch up off the table, discovering that it weighs ten times what it looks like it should. Inexplicably Alvarado tries to kick Toddy, but hits the dobermann instead. While the doberman is pouncing on Alvarado, Toddy unconsciously drops the gold watch into his box and escapes.

Toddy heads back to Milt's shop, and Milt informs him that Elaine is in jail again. Toddy bails her out and takes her back to their hotel. The two argue and Elaine locks herself in the bathroom. While she is showering Toddy opens his box and discovers Alvarado's golden watch. Upon examination, he realizes its casing is made of a pound of twenty-four karat, pure gold. He hides the watch in his drawer and goes to Milt's shop. He asks Milt about selling large quantities of gold but Milt, knowing the risks, is not interested. Toddy heads back home and finds his room ransacked and Elaine strangled to death with a stocking. He looks out the window and sees a man on the fire escape with his leg caught.

The man is Donald, an enforcer for a small-time protection racket run by a man named Shake. Toddy forces Donald back to Shake's hideout and interrogates the two men. Donald claims to know nothing of Elaine's murder or the gold watch, he merely came upon the scene having gone to the hotel to extort Toddy. Toddy wrestles with feelings of guilt and relief at Elaine's death, and ponders leaving town, as he will be the prime suspect in her murder.

Out on the street Toddy spots Dolores in a parked convertible with the dobermann in the back seat. The dobermann chases Toddy down and brings him back to the car. Dolores takes Toddy to Alvarado's house. Alvarado demands Toddy return the gold watch but Toddy tells him it is gone and his wife has been murdered. Alvarado denies involvement, and Dolores corroborates this by saying she checked out the hotel room and there was no dead body. Alvarado reveals he is an agent of a foreign government-operated gold-smuggling ring. He tells Toddy his gold supplier wants out of the operation and probably murdered Elaine to frame Alvarado thus blowing the ring's cover. He tells Toddy to wait for him in Tijuana.

Milt takes a phone call from Alvarado revealing that he is the gold-supplier to Alvarado's group of South American gold-smugglers and he murdered Elaine to get Toddy out of the picture.

Meanwhile, a bale bondsman named Airedale Aahrens is hired to bring Elaine into court for her misdemeanor drunk and disorderly. He goes to Toddy's hotel room but finds nothing except a wisp of hair in the clamp of the incinerator stack. He suspects Elaine is dead and her body was burned.

Toddy meets Dolores in Tijuana and she takes him to San Diego to see Alvarado. Later Alvarado reveals he intends to silence them all to conceal his operation and shows Toddy two coffins containing his dobermann and Dolores, both drugged with chloroform. A struggle ensues, shots are fired, and the dobermann wakes up and kills Alvarado. Toddy revives Dolores from the chloroform and they share an intimate moment just as the police arrive. Toddy is arrested and Dolores is released because she has a student visa and no criminal record.

In police custody Toddy has concluded that Milt is Alvarado's gold supplier and convinces treasury agent McKinley to release him to track Milt down. Toddy goes to Milt's shop and accuses him of the whole plot. Dolores arrives, as she had been lured there by Milt. Elaine, who faked her own death, emerges with a gun from behind a curtain. Milt wanted to steal Elaine from Toddy, and brought her into the plot with the promise of living rich. Milt and Elaine take Toddy and Dolores in a car to the beach to kill them and dispose of their bodies in the ocean. Elaine double-crosses Milt and shoots him. Just as she is about to shoot Toddy, federal agents who had been tailing them arrive and gun her down. Toddy reflects that his golden gizmo is finally gone for good.
