= The Getaway (novel) =

1958 crime novel by Jim Thompson

- First edition
- Author: Jim Thompson
- Language: English
- Genre: Crime fiction
- Publisher: Signet
- Publication date: 1958
- Publication place: United States
- Media type: Print
- Pages: 169 pp
- OCLC: 865493383

The Getaway is a 1958 crime novel by Jim Thompson.

== Tagline ==
Doc McCoy pulls off what he thinks is the perfect bank robbery, but there are things he has forgotten, including a treacherous partner, his amateur criminal wife, and that there is no such thing as a clean getaway.

== Plot ==
Carter "Doc" McCoy, an expert criminal who was recently released from prison on a pardon, plans to commit a bank robbery with three accomplices. One is his wife Carol, a former librarian who was charmed by Doc's ruthlessness and immorality and thus became his partner-in-crime; she is waiting with their getaway car. The other two are the thuggish Rudy Torrento and the naive Jackson, both of whom are discussing the group's planned escape route: they intend to travel first to California, where they are to stay at a tourist camp Rudy knows while the heat dies down, and then intend to sneak across the Mexican border to go to a mysterious sanctuary for criminals run by a man called El Rey ("The King").

The bank's guard opens the door to prepare for the day, at which point Doc shoots and kills him from across the street. Rudy and Jackson hide the guard's body, then lie in wait as the other three members of the bank staff arrive for work, tying up each in turn. They steal about $250,000 ($2.8 million today), at which point Rudy kills Jackson in order to increase his share of the proceeds. Doc starts a fire so they can escape while everyone is distracted. Rudy, guessing that Doc will try to kill him, pulls a gun, but Doc shoots first, seemingly killing Rudy, then meets up with Carol.

Doc and Carol drive to the rural home of Beynon, the politician who sold Doc his pardon. Doc still owes Beynon some money, and wants to pay him off before fleeing the country. Meanwhile, Rudy regains consciousness and realizes that he may still survive if he can get medical treatment. He remembers a former cellmate and friend, Dr. Vonderschied, and imagines him advising that a veterinarian can treat him. A patrol of two police officers stumble across his position, but Rudy kills both and flees.

Doc and Carol find Beynon drunk and despondent; the news has reported the deaths of the bank guard and two policemen and he feels morally responsible. He then tries to convince Doc that Carol, who was the one who actually met with him and negotiated Doc's pardon, had agreed to betray and ultimately kill Doc so that she and Beynon could take the money and run. Carol storms in and shoots Beynon dead, then insists that Beynon was lying. Doc is troubled but accepts this.

The couple decide to drive to Kansas City, take a train to California, and then cross the border. Carol wonders if they can hole up in California with the help of the Santis criminal family, whose ancient matriarch Ma Santis is always willing to hide her friends and associates from the police. Doc dismisses the idea, doubting that Ma Santis is still alive.

They drive Beynon's car to the Kansas City train station. Carol enters first while Doc disposes of the car, but a con artist manages to steal Carol's suitcase containing all the money. The con artist sneaks onto a train, pockets a sheaf of bills from the suitcase, and hides in an otherwise empty car. However, Carol and Doc find and kill the con artist shortly after the train leaves the station. After disembarking, Doc and Carol steal a vehicle by killing the driver.

The con artist's body is discovered, and when authorities realize that the sheaf of bills in his pocket came from the bank, they conclude that Doc and Carol were the killers. A police bulletin is broadcast, forcing Doc and Carol to change plans once again.

Rudy compels a rural veterinarian named Harold Clinton to treat and bandage his wound. Upon learning that his bandages will need to be changed a few times every day, Rudy forces Harold and his wife Fran to travel with him to California. From the news updates, Rudy deduces that Doc and Carol will need to move quietly and slowly. This allows Rudy to take the trip slowly and he begins to sleep with Fran, who is charmed by Rudy's brutish nature. Though Harold sleeps in the same bed, he cannot bring himself to do anything about his wife's infidelity. He soon kills himself in despair, at which point Rudy begins beating Fran, but she continues to slavishly love and obey him.

Doc and Carol pay a migrant family to travel in the bed of their truck. After several days they arrive in California and make their way to the tourist court, where they are ambushed by Rudy and Fran. Doc manages to shoot and kill both before commandeering a taxi. The cabbie radios his dispatch before Doc and Carol throw him out, so the police are able to set up a roadblock. Doc spots Ma Santis on the side of the road, and she waves them in to her hidden refuge.

=== Escape ===
Santis needs time to arrange Doc and Carol's passage across the border and to El Rey's kingdom, so she hides them in partially-submerged caves for two days. Santis then has her son Earl take the couple to his farm while he negotiates their passage with the captain of a fishing boat. Doc and Carol are forced to wait inside a hollowed-out pile of manure for another three days. The two are finally smuggled into the fishing boat. As they are leaving American waters, a small Coast Guard cutter stops it, but Doc and Carol kill all three officers.

Doc and Carol finally reach the kingdom of El Rey, which is indeed a sanctuary where criminals can live openly without fear of being extradited. However, all the goods for sale are luxury or first-class, so the cost of living is quite high. Furthermore, El Rey dictates that all residents must spend a certain amount of money per month. This means that, no matter how wealthy a criminal is upon arriving, he quickly gives all his money to El Rey. Fearing banishment to an outlying village with no food or drink, rife with cannibalism and suicide, the criminals kill each other in an attempt to accumulate money to pay El Rey.

During the annual ball, the one night every year in which El Rey hosts a big party in his palace and disallows any "accidents", Doc despairs that he will have to kill Carol in order to make their money last longer and avoid the cannibal village. He wanders through El Rey's palace and comes across Dr. Vonderschied, Rudy's friend. Doc tries to convince Vonderschied to talk Carol into some kind of surgery, then kill her during the process. Vonderschied reveals that Carol tried to pay him to enact the same plan against Doc. He denounces both for squandering their many talents and luck in pursuit of a monstrously bloody life of crime. Vonderschied directs Doc to Carol, hiding in the room. The couple acknowledge that they love each other, but neither denies that it will end with murder so one can avoid the cannibal village for a little while longer. As the clock strikes midnight, they sardonically toast their "successful getaway".

== Symbolism ==
Much has been made of the symbolism of the last third of the book, in which the text transitions from a gritty crime thriller into a surreal and heavily allegorical drama. The caves that Ma Santis compels McCoy and Carol to hide in have been analogized to tombs or graves, the manure pile to rot and decomposition, and the boat ride to crossing the River Styx. Additionally, El Rey itself is compared to Hell, for it is described as a place where people "seem to live an eternity" and suffer immensely all the while. El Rey is mentioned in the movie From Dusk till Dawn by George Clooney's character Seth several times. At the end, he asks Juliette Lewis' character Kate if she knows what El Rey is when she asks to accompany him there.

== Film adaptations ==
The novel has been adapted into films twice. Sam Peckinpah's 1972 film version of The Getaway starred Steve McQueen and Ali MacGraw. Roger Donaldson's 1994 film version of The Getaway starred Alec Baldwin and Kim Basinger. In both films the surreal ending in the hellish domain of El Rey is discarded for a happy ending in which Doc and his wife ultimately escape to freedom.
