= The Rip-Off (novel) =

1989 novel by Jim Thompson

- Author: Jim Thompson
- Language: English
- Publication date: 1989
- Publication place: United States
- Media type: Print

The Rip-Off is a crime novel by Jim Thompson. The book was rejected for publication during Thompson's lifetime; the date of composition is assumed to be sometime in the late 1960s or early 1970s, when Thompson's health was in decline. Thompson died in 1977.

The Rip-Off was initially published as a heavily edited and abridged serial in The New Black Mask Quarterly in 1985. The book version appeared four years later.

== Plot ==
Britton Rainstar is deeply in love with a woman named Manuela Aloe and the longer he stays with her, the closer to death he comes.
