= Boston Society of Film Critics Awards 1990 =

Annual US film awards ceremony

11th BSFC Awards

January 6, 1991

Best Film:
Goodfellas

The 11th Boston Society of Film Critics Awards honored the best filmmaking of 1990. The awards were given on 6 January 1991.

== Winners ==
- Best Film:
  - Goodfellas
- Best Actor:
  - Jeremy Irons – Reversal of Fortune
- Best Actress:
  - Anjelica Huston – The Grifters and The Witches
- Best Supporting Actor:
  - Joe Pesci – Goodfellas
- Best Supporting Actress:
  - Jennifer Jason Leigh – Last Exit to Brooklyn and Miami Blues
- Best Director:
  - Martin Scorsese – Goodfellas
- Best Screenplay:
  - Nicholas Kazan – Reversal of Fortune
- Best Foreign-Language Film:
  - Monsieur Hire • France
