= The Grifters (novel) =

1963 novel by Jim Thompson

- First edition
- Author: Jim Thompson
- Language: English
- Genre: Crime novel
- Publisher: Regency Books
- Publication date: 1963
- Publication place: United States
- Media type: Print

The Grifters is a noir fiction novel by Jim Thompson, published in 1963.

== Plot ==
Roy Dillon is a 25-year-old con artist living in Los Angeles. At the start of the novel, he gets hit in the stomach with a baseball bat when a simple con goes wrong. He seems to be well but when Lilly — his mother — visits him for the first time in almost eight years, he starts to deteriorate. She calls for a doctor, who informs her that Roy is internally hemorrhaging. Roy is taken to the hospital, where he begins to recover after several days.

While at the hospital, his mother meets Moira Langtry, the woman that Roy is currently involved with. They take an instant dislike to each other. Lilly hires a nurse, Carol Roberg, in the hope that Roy will give up Moira for Carol. Roy then leaves the hospital and stays at Lilly's apartment where Carol looks after him. Roy discovers that Carol was the victim of a sexual experiment at Dachau. With this knowledge, but mostly because Roy does not want to associate with a person paid by Lilly, he breaks off his relationship with Carol.

Meanwhile, Lilly is at the race track working for an organization headed by gangster Bobo Justus. He comes to meet her and he takes her back to his apartment. He proceeds to beat her for a serious mistake she made several months earlier. In the process, he badly burns the back of her hand with a cigar. She goes back to her apartment where she has a fight with Roy, and tells him to give up the grift. Roy goes back to work for the day and meets his new boss Perk Kraggs, who takes a liking to him. He offers him a job as a sales manager. Roy is unsure if he should take it or not.

Roy then goes away with Moira to La Jolla for the weekend. Her suspicions that Roy is a con man are confirmed when she sees him conning a group of sailors on the train. Later, she tells him that they should work together, but he refuses; Moira becomes furious, and Roy slaps her and leaves, thinking that is the end of the relationship.

Later, he decides to take the sales job and quit grifting. The police then visit Roy, informing him that his mother has committed suicide. He presumes that Moira killed her; however, when he sees the body, he notices there is no burn on her hand. Roy then understands that the body is Moira's and that Lilly is still alive.

In the meantime, his mother has gone to his apartment to steal his money. Roy returns to his apartment, and catches Lilly in the act. He tells her that, for her own good, he won't let her take it and that he wants her to quit grifting. Lilly pleads with Roy to let her have the money, asking him what she should offer (tempting him to acknowledge his incestuous urge toward her). Lilly suggests that Roy finish his drink, distracting him and providing the opportunity to hit him with her purse. The blow accidentally breaks the glass, which cuts into Roy's neck, causing him to bleed to death. After grasping that she has killed her own son, Lilly promptly regains her composure and leaves with his money.

== Principal characters ==
Roy Dillon: A 25-year-old short con artist. He has a dysfunctional relationship with his mother. He didn't go to college but left home when he was 18. He was taught how to con people by a man named Mintz.

Lilly Dillon: A 39-year-old working for Bobo Justus, a bookmaker out of Baltimore, Maryland. She was very young when she gave birth to Roy. Inattentive, even callous as a mother, she nonetheless feels owed by her son. She is on the long con. She often feels there is no way out of grifting for her.

Moira Langtry: She was involved with Roy and is involved in the long con. She doesn't get along with Roy's mother. She wants to team with Roy, thinking that her successful career of grifting is nearly over the older she gets.

== Film adaptation ==
In 1990, the novel was adapted into a film, The Grifters, directed by Stephen Frears. John Cusack, Annette Bening and Anjelica Huston played the principal roles. It has a 90% approval rating on Rotten Tomatoes, based on 42 reviews.
