= Jim Thompson (writer) =

American novelist (1906–1977)

- Born: James Myers Thompson; September 27, 1906; Anadarko, Oklahoma Territory, U.S.
- Died: April 7, 1977 (aged 70); Los Angeles, California, U.S.
- Occupation: Novelist
- Writing career
- Language: English
- Genres: Crime fiction, hardboiled, pulp, autobiography, suspense, literary fiction
- Notable works: The Grifters; After Dark, My Sweet; The Killer Inside Me

James Myers Thompson (September 27, 1906 – April 7, 1977) was an American novelist and screenwriter, known for his hardboiled crime fiction.

Thompson wrote more than 30 novels, the majority of which were original paperback publications, published from the late-1940s through mid-1950s. Despite some positive critical notice—notably by Anthony Boucher in The New York Times—he was little-recognized in his lifetime. Only after death did Thompson's literary stature grow. In the late 1980s, several of his novels were re-published in the Black Lizard series of re-discovered crime fiction.

His best-regarded works include The Killer Inside Me, Savage Night, A Hell of a Woman and Pop. 1280. In these works, Thompson turned the derided crime genre into literature and art, featuring unreliable narrators, odd structure, and the quasi-surrealistic inner narratives of the last thoughts of his dying or dead characters. A number of Thompson's books were adapted as popular films, including The Getaway and The Grifters.

The writer Ronald Verlin Cassill has suggested that of all crime fiction, Thompson's was the rawest and most harrowing; that neither Dashiell Hammett nor Raymond Chandler nor Horace McCoy ever "wrote a book within miles of Thompson". Similarly, in the introduction to Now and on Earth, Stephen King says he most admires Thompson's work because "The guy was over the top. The guy was absolutely over the top. Big Jim didn't know the meaning of the word stop. There are three brave 'lets' inherent in the foregoing: He let himself see everything, he let himself write it down, then he let himself publish it."

Thompson was called a "Dimestore Dostoevsky" by writer Geoffrey O'Brien. Film director Stephen Frears, who directed an adaptation of Thompson's The Grifters in 1990, also identified elements of Greek tragedy in his themes.

== Life and career ==
Thompson's novels were considered semi-autobiographical, or, at least, inspired by his experiences. (The theme of a once-prominent family overtaken by ill-fortune was featured in some of Thompson's works.)

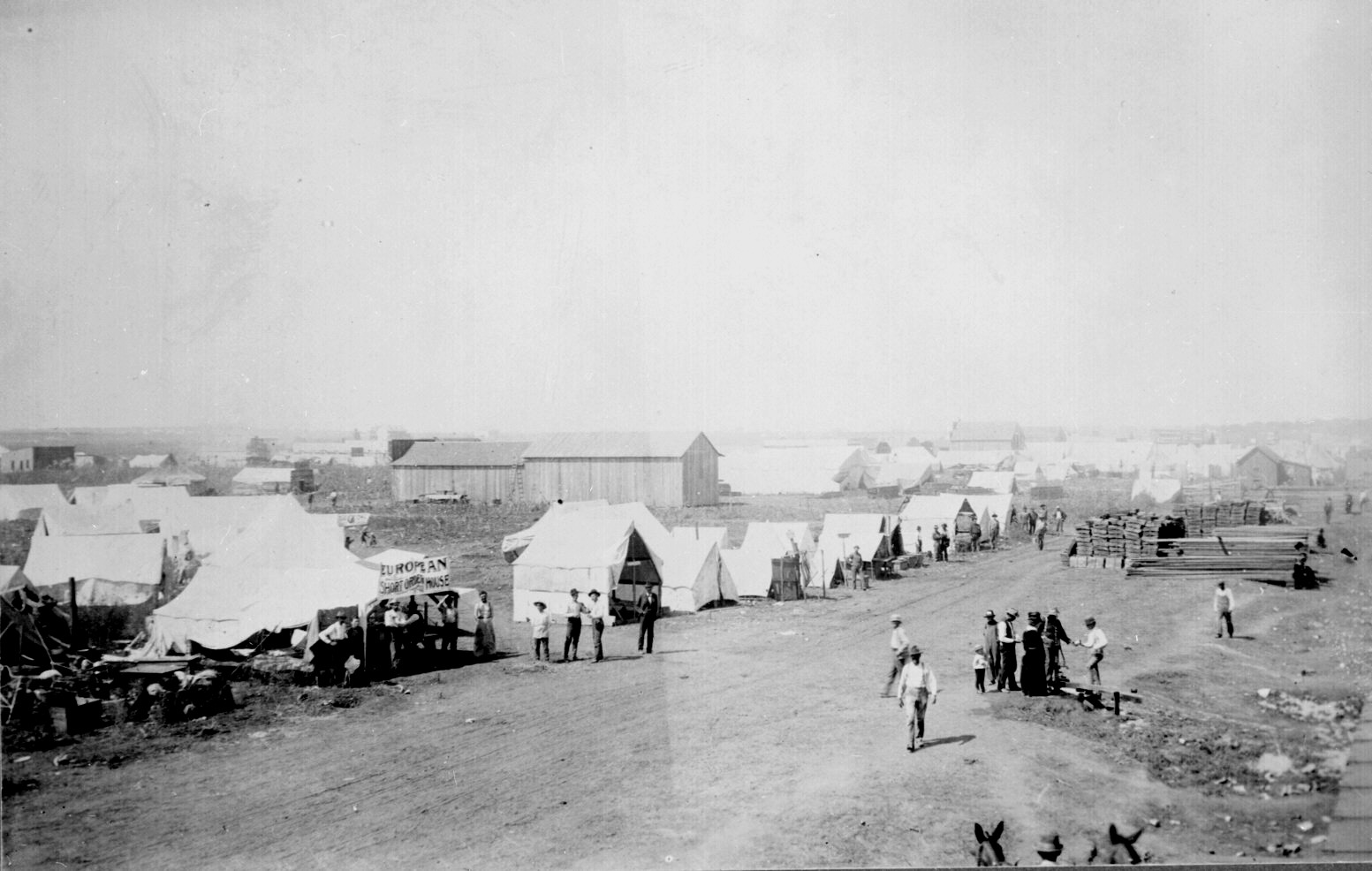
Anadarko in 1901, a few years before Thompson's birth

Thompson's father, known as "Big Jim" Thompson, was a teacher for a decade in Burwell, Nebraska, before his son's birth; his wife and Jim's mother, Birdie Myers, was a former student. He moved the family to Anadarko, Oklahoma Territory, and was elected sheriff of Caddo County. He ran for the state legislature in 1906, but was defeated. Jim Thompson was born in 1906 in an apartment over the county jail. In 1907, Big Jim was accused of embezzlement and fled to Mexico on horseback. The rest of the family moved back to Birdie's family farm in Burwell. In 1910, they reunited in Oklahoma City and eventually moved again to Fort Worth, Texas, where Big Jim worked in the oil industry, making and losing a fortune.

Thompson's father would inspire several characters in his later fiction, including Lou Ford of The Killer Inside Me. Thompson's complicated feelings toward his father were expressed in his writing; biographer Robert Polito noted that the books which expressly name and chronicle Thompson's father, Bad Boy and King Blood, were "respectful to the point of idolatry," whereas The Killer Inside Me and Pop. 1280 "roil with Oedipal anger" and ridicule him as a psychopathic killer.

=== Early work ===
Thompson began writing early, and he published a few short pieces while still in his mid-teens. He was intelligent and well-read, but had little interest in or inclination towards formal education. For about two years during prohibition in Fort Worth, Texas, Thompson worked long and often wild nights as a bellboy while attending school in the day. He worked at the Hotel Texas. One biographical profile reports that "Thompson quickly adapted to the needs of the hotel's guests, busily catering to tastes ranging from questionable morality to directly and undeniably illegal." Bootleg liquor was ubiquitous, and Thompson's brief trips to procure heroin and marijuana for hotel patrons were not uncommon. He was soon earning up to $300 per week more than his official $15 monthly wage.

He smoked and drank heavily, and at age 19 he suffered a nervous breakdown. In 1926, Thompson began working as an oilfield laborer. In the oil fields, he met Harry McClintock, a musician, as well as a member and organizer for Industrial Workers of the World, who recruited him into the union. With his father, he began an independent oil drilling operation that was ultimately unsuccessful. Thompson returned to Fort Worth, intending to attend school and to write professionally.

Thompson's autobiographical "Oil Field Vignettes" was published in 1929 (published again in First Fiction: An Anthology of the First Published Stories by Famous Writers in 1994, and then discovered in March 2010 by history recovery specialist Lee Roy Chapman who helped bring wider attention to the story). He began attending the University of Nebraska the same year as part of a program for gifted students with "untraditional educational backgrounds". However, by 1931, he dropped out of school.

For several years, Thompson occasionally wrote short stories for various true crime magazines. Generally, he wrote about murder cases about which he had read in newspapers, but using a first person voice. In this era, he wrote other pieces for various newspapers and magazines, usually as a freelancer, but occasionally as a full-time staff writer. His 1936 "Ditch of Doom," published in Master Detective magazine, was selected by the Library of America in the early 21st century for inclusion in its two-century retrospective of American writing for true crime.

In the early 1930s, Thompson worked as the head of the Oklahoma Federal Writers' Project, one of several New Deal programs intended to provide work for Americans during the Great Depression. Louis L'Amour, among others, worked under Thompson's direction in this project. Thompson joined the Communist Party in 1935 but left the group by 1938.

=== First novels ===
In the early stages of World War II, Thompson worked at an aircraft factory. He was investigated by the FBI because of his early Communist Party affiliation. These events were fodder for his semi-autobiographical debut novel Now and on Earth (1942). It established his bleak, pessimistic tone, and it was positively reviewed but sold poorly. It featured little of the violence and crime that later permeated his writing. In his second novel Heed the Thunder (1946), Thompson centered it on crime. It explores a warped and violent Nebraska family, partly modeled on his own extended clan.

Gaining little attention, Thompson gravitated to the less-prestigious but more lucrative crime fiction genre with Nothing More Than Murder. He afterwards moved to Lion Books, a small paperback publisher. Lion's Arnold Hano was his ideal editor, offering the writer essentially free rein about content, yet expecting him to be productive and reliable. Lion published most of Thompson's best-regarded works.

To support his family while writing novels, Thompson took a job as a reporter with the Los Angeles Mirror, a tabloid newspaper owned by the Los Angeles Times, shortly after the Mirror was founded in 1948. He wrote for the Mirror until 1949.

=== Fifties maturity and The Killer Inside Me ===
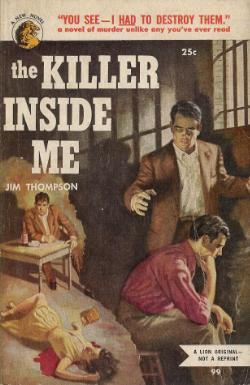
The Killer Inside Me

In 1952, Thompson published The Killer Inside Me. The narrator, Lou Ford, is a small-town deputy sheriff who appears amiable, pleasant and slightly dull-minded. Ford is actually very intelligent and fighting a nearly-constant urge to act violently; Ford describes his urge as the sickness (always italicised). Lion Books tried to have The Killer Inside Me nominated for a National Book Award. It was eponymously adapted for the cinema in 1976 (by director Burt Kennedy, with Stacy Keach as Lou Ford) and again in 2010 (by director Michael Winterbottom, with Casey Affleck as Ford and co-starring Kate Hudson and Jessica Alba). After The Killer Inside Me was published, Thompson began producing novels at a furious pace. He published another novel in 1952, then five novels a year in 1953 and 1954.

Savage Night, published in 1953, is generally ranked as one of his best novels. It is also one of his oddest literary offerings. Its narrator, Charlie "Little" Bigger (also known as Carl Bigelow), is a small, tubercular hitman whose mind is deteriorating with his body. In reviewing Savage Night, Boucher said it was "written with vigor and bite, but sheering off from realism into a peculiar surrealism ending of sheer Guignol horror. Odd that a mass-consumption paperback should contain the most experimental writing I've seen in a suspense novel of late". Savage Night contains an interlude—whether or not it is fantasy or dream, hallucination or flashback is unclear—when Bigger meets a poor, verbose writer who, much like Thompson, has a penchant for booze and makes a living writing pulp fiction to be sold alongside pornography. The writer also claims to operate a "farm" where he grows vaginas as a metaphor for the material he writes.

=== Film work with Stanley Kubrick ===
In 1955, Thompson moved to Hollywood, California, where Stanley Kubrick commissioned him to write the screenplay adaptation of Lionel White's novel Clean Break. This was filmed as The Killing, Kubrick's first studio-financed movie. Thompson wrote most of the script, but Kubrick credited himself as screenplay writer, giving Thompson only a "dialogue" writer credit. They collaborated again on Paths of Glory (with Calder Willingham) and in the criminal story titled Lunatic at Large that never materialized despite Thompson's having completed and submitted the screen treatment. Although pleased with the work, Kubrick was side-tracked by Spartacus; when Kubrick returned to Lunatic at Large, the sole copy of Thompson's manuscript had been lost. Kubrick was quoted by family and friends as regretting the lost opportunity.

Although films would later be made based on Thompson's novels, The Killing and Paths of Glory would be the only produced films on which Thompson received on-screen writing credit for either dialogue or screenplay.

=== Later novels, television work and novelizations ===
After his film work, Thompson remained a resident of California for the rest of his life. From the mid-1950s through the late 1960s, Thompson continued to write fiction, although not at the same torrid pace of 1952 to 1954. During this era, Thompson usually completed one novel a year, but he gradually drifted away from writing his increasingly unpopular novels, abandoning the medium completely by the end of the 1960s. In 1967, he published South of Heaven, about a young migrant laborer working on an oil pipeline in Texas.

With his novels providing scant income, Thompson turned to other forms of writing to pay the bills. Beginning in 1959 and continuing through the mid-1960s, Thompson also began writing television programs, including episodes of the action/adventure shows Mackenzie's Raiders (1959), Cain's Hundred (1961) and Convoy (1965). Television work seemingly dried up for Thompson after this point, so he turned to writing tie-in novels based on produced television shows and screenplays: this work paid a flat fee and could be completed quickly. Thompson's tie-ins include an original novel based on the television series Ironside (1967), as well as screenplay novelizations of the films The Undefeated (1969) and Nothing But a Man (1970).

In the late 1960s, Thompson wrote his two final original books, King Blood and Child of Rage (its provisional title was White Mother, Black Son), neither of which were published until the early 1970s, the latter in the United Kingdom.

=== Later life and death ===
In 1970, Thompson was flown to Robert Redford's Utah residence. Redford hired him to write a motion picture script about the life of a hobo during the Great Depression. Thompson was paid $10,000 for his script Bo, though it never was produced.

Motion picture writer/director Sam Fuller expressed an interest in adapting The Getaway for the screen, and Thompson's biographer Robert Polito, in the biography Savage Art, notes that Fuller so admired the novel that he quipped, half-seriously, that he could use the novel as a shooting script. Eventually, Sam Peckinpah was slated to direct The Getaway.

In many regards, The Getaway was a frustrating repeat of his earlier experience collaborating with director Stanley Kubrick on the screenplay of the movie The Killing (1956). Thompson wrote a script, but Steve McQueen (who was cast in the movie's lead role of Doc McCoy) rejected it as too reliant on dialogue, with not enough action. Though Walter Hill was given the sole script credit, Thompson insisted that much of his script ended up in the film. Thompson sought Writers Guild arbitration but the Guild ultimately ruled against him. In the end, the film was heavily bowdlerized from Thompson's original vision and as Stephen King writes, "if you have seen only the film version of The Getaway, you have no idea of the existential horrors awaiting Doc and Carol McCoy at the point where Sam Peckinpah ended the story."

Thompson actually appeared in the movie Farewell, My Lovely (1975), starring Robert Mitchum. He played the character Judge Baxter Wilson Grayle. When Thompson's fortunes were fading, he made the acquaintance of writer Harlan Ellison who had long admired Thompson's books. Though Thompson still drank heavily (preferring to meet at the famed writer's haunt, the Musso & Frank Grill) and Ellison was a teetotaler (preferring fast food restaurants), they often met for meals and conversation.

Though Thompson's books were falling out of print in the United States, the French had discovered his works. Though they were not runaway bestsellers in France, his books did sell well enough in that country to keep a trickle of royalties flowing towards Thompson. Incidentally, Polito also debunks the myth that Thompson was not paid well for his works: Thompson's pay, he notes, was roughly in line with what writers of similar works received during that era.

Thompson died in Los Angeles, aged 70, after a series of strokes aggravated by his long-term alcoholism. He refused to eat for some time before his death, and this self-inflicted starvation contributed greatly to his demise. At the time of his death, none of his novels were in print in his home country.

Thompson's papers from 1955 to 1958, including typescripts and original drafts of about a dozen novels, are archived at UCLA's Charles E. Young Research Library.

== Style ==
Thompson's novels frequently center on grifters, losers, addicts and sociopaths, some at the margins of society and at its heart— told mostly through a first person narrative, their nihilistic worldview revealing a frighteningly deep understanding of the criminally warped mind. Geoffrey O' Brien has written that most of Thompson's protagonists are evil "the way they might be albino or left-handed." Writer Meredith Brody has similarly described Thompson's typical antihero as "a troubled, perhaps even schizophrenic, misogynist who drinks a lot and kills people when he feels like it."

Despite some positive critical notice, Thompson did not achieve a measure of fame until after his best years as a writer. Yet that neglect might stem from his style: the crime novels are fast-moving and compelling but sometimes sloppy and uneven. Thompson wrote quickly (many novels were written in a month); using his newspaper experience to write concise, evocative prose with little editing.

Yet at his best his novels were among the most effectively and memorably written genre pieces. He also managed unusual and highly successful literary tricks: halfway through A Hell of a Woman, the first-person narrator Frank "Dolly" Dillon has a mental breakdown; the sides of his personality then take turns narrating the chapters, alternately violently psychotic (telling the sordid tale that happened) or sweet-natured and patient (telling the idealized fantasy that did not happen). In the final page of the original manuscript the two sides of Dillon's broken personality appear together as two columns of text. The publisher disliked that and instead alternated the two narrations in a long paragraph, alternating standard Roman type and italicized type. Thompson disliked the change, thinking it confusing and difficult for the reader.

For most of his life Thompson drank heavily; the effects of alcoholism often featured in his works, most prominently in The Alcoholics (1953) which is set in a detoxification clinic. Donald E. Westlake, who adapted The Grifters for the screen, observed that alcoholism had a great role in Thompson's literature, but it tended to be tacit and subtle. Westlake described typical personal relationships in Thompson novels as pleasant in the morning, argumentative in the afternoon and abusive at night—behavior common to the alcoholic Thompson's style of life but which he elided from the stories.

== Film adaptations ==
Two of Thompson's books (The Getaway and The Killer Inside Me) were adapted as Hollywood motion pictures during his lifetime receiving relatively poor reviews. However, Polito argues that neither adaptation was ultimately true to Thompson's spirit. A second, more faithful adaptation of The Killer Inside Me was released in 2010, starring Casey Affleck and directed by Michael Winterbottom.

French director Bertrand Tavernier adapted Pop. 1280 for his movie Coup de Torchon (1981), changing the setting from the American South to a French colony in West Africa of the 1930s. Aside from shift in setting, Polito argues that Coup de Torchon was remarkably faithful to the plot and the spirit of the novel, and—along with the movie The Grifters (1990)—remains arguably the most authentic adaptation of any of Thompson's work.

A Hell of a Woman was adapted in French as Série noire (1979) by Alain Corneau, with dialogue by French Oulipo writer Georges Pérec. This noir masterpiece set in the grim Paris outskirts features a 16-year-old Marie Trintignant's debut performance as well as what is generally agreed to be Patrick Dewaere's finest performance. Dewaere conveys a tragic dimension to his manic portrayal of a mediocre door-to-door salesman, at one point repeatedly bashing his head against a car in an effort to exorcise his angst and guilt.

In the early 1990s, Hollywood resumed its interest in Thompson's writing and several of his novels were re-published. Three novels were adapted for new film treatments during that period: The Kill-Off; After Dark, My Sweet; and The Grifters, which garnered four Academy Award nominations.

The Getaway was remade in 1994 with Alec Baldwin and Kim Basinger in the lead roles; the film retained the happy ending of the earlier film and received comparably poor reviews.

In 1996, A Swell-Looking Babe was released as Hit Me, and 1997 saw the release of This World, Then the Fireworks from Thompson's short story of that name. The latter film starred Billy Zane and Gina Gershon as a pair of twisted siblings.

== In popular culture ==
Writer Donald Westlake, who adapted Thompson's novel The Grifters for the 1990 movie, paid homage to Thompson by naming the villain in his own novel Drowned Hopes, a criminal psychopath named "Tom Jimson", after him. A collection of Thompson first-editions also plays a recurring role in the plot of the FX series The Lowdown.

== Major works ==
- Now and on Earth (1942)
- Heed the Thunder (aka Sins of the Fathers) (1946)
- Nothing More Than Murder (1949)
- The Killer Inside Me (1952)
- Cropper's Cabin (1952)
- Recoil (1953)
- The Alcoholics (1953)
- Savage Night (1953)
- Bad Boy (1953)
- The Criminal (1953)
- The Nothing Man (1954)
- The Golden Gizmo (1954)
- Roughneck (1954)
- A Swell-Looking Babe (1954)
- A Hell of a Woman (1954)
- After Dark, My Sweet (1955)
- The Kill-Off (1957)
- Wild Town (1957)
- The Getaway (1958)
- The Transgressors (1961)
- The Grifters (1963)
- Pop. 1280 (1964)
- Texas by the Tail (1965)
- South of Heaven (1967)
- Ironside (1967), original novel based on the TV series
- The Undefeated (1969), novelization of the screenplay by James Lee Barrett
- Nothing but a Man (1970), novelization of the screenplay by Michael Roemer and Robert M. Young
- Child of Rage (1972)
- King Blood (1973)
- The Rip-Off (1985)
- Fireworks: The Lost Writings of Jim Thompson (1988)

=== Omnibus ===
- Jim Thompson Omnibus (1983) (republished in 1995)
- Jim Thompson Omnibus 2 (1985) (republished in 1997)
