= Hotel Free Exchange =

1934 film

- Directed by: Marc Allégret
- Written by: Marc Allégret; Jacques Prévert
- Based on: L'Hôtel du libre échange by Maurice Desvallières and Georges Feydeau
- Produced by: Alexandre Kamenka
- Starring: Fernandel; André Alerme; Ginette Leclerc
- Cinematography: Roger Hubert
- Edited by: Denise Tual
- Production company: Or-Film
- Distributed by: Pathé Consortium Cinéma
- Release date: 9 November 1934
- Running time: 95 minutes
- Country: France
- Language: French

Hotel Free Exchange (French: L'hôtel du libre échange) is a 1934 French comedy film directed by Marc Allégret and starring Fernandel, André Alerme and Ginette Leclerc. It is based on the 1894 play of the same title by Maurice Desvallières and Georges Feydeau, later remade as the 1966 British film Hotel Paradiso. It was shot at the Billancourt Studios in Paris. The film's sets were designed by the art director Lazare Meerson.

== Cast ==
- Fernandel as Boulot
- André Alerme as Paillardin
- Ginette Leclerc as Victoire
- Raymond Cordy as Bastien
- Saturnin Fabre as Mathieu
- Pierre Larquey as Pinglet
- Pierre Palau as Boucard, le commissaire
- Marion Delbo as Angélique Pinglet
- Marcel Duhamel as M. Chervet
- Raymond Galle as Maxime
- Mona Lys as Marcelle Paillardin
- Anthony Gildès as L'employé du commissariat
- Géo Lastry as Le client bien
- Jacques B. Brunius as Le monsieur du train
- Ariane Borg as Paquerette
- Claire Gérard as La bonne
- Simone Dulac as La dame du train
- Raymond Bussières as Bob
- Serge Grave as Maxime

== Bibliography ==
- Bessy, Maurice & Chirat, Raymond. Histoire du cinéma français: 1929-1934. Pygmalion, 1988.
- Crisp, Colin. Genre, Myth and Convention in the French Cinema, 1929-1939. Indiana University Press, 2002.
- Goble, Alan. The Complete Index to Literary Sources in Film. Walter de Gruyter, 1999.
- Rège, Philippe. Encyclopedia of French Film Directors, Volume 1. Scarecrow Press, 2009.
