= Pierre Prévert =

French film director (1906–1988)

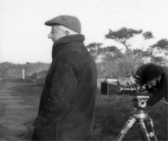
Pierre Prévert in 1980

Pierre Prévert (26 May 1906 – 5 April 1988) was a French film director, screenwriter, and actor.

He was the brother of Jacques Prévert, who was the subject of his documentary Mon frère Jacques. He was the father of screenwriter Catherine Prévert.

== Filmography ==
=== Film ===
- 1928 : Souvenir de Paris, collaboration with Jacques Prévert and Marcel Duhamel
- 1932 : L'affaire est dans le sac
- 1933 : Monsieur Cordon, story by Jean Aurenche
- 1935 : Le commissaire est bon enfant, le gendarme est sans pitié, collaboration with Jacques Becker
- 1943 : Adieu Léonard
- 1947 : Mystery Trip
- 1958 : Paris mange son pain
- 1960 : Paris la belle

=== Television ===
- 1961 : Mon frère Jacques
- 1963 : Le Perroquet du fils Hoquet
- 1964 : Le Petit Claus et le Grand Claus
- 1965 : La Maison du passeur
- 1966 : À la Belle Étoile
- 1966 : Les Compagnons de Baal

=== Assistant director ===
- 1929 : Le Petit Chaperon rouge, by Alberto Cavalcanti
- 1931 : La Chienne by Jean Renoir
- 1931 : Baleydier by Jean Mamy
- 1932 : Fanny by Marc Allégret
- 1934 : L'Hôtel du libre échange by Marc Allégret
- 1935 : Fanfare d'amour by Richard Pottier
- 1936 : Moutonnet, by René Sti
- 1937 : Drôle de drame by Marcel Carné
- 1937 : Mollenard by Robert Siodmak
- 1938 : Le Récif de corail by Maurice Gleize
- 1945 : Félicie Nanteuil by Marc Allégret

=== Actor ===
- 1929 : Le Petit Chaperon rouge, by Alberto Cavalcanti
- 1930 : La Joie d'une heure by André Cerf
- 1930 : L'Âge d'or by Luis Buñuel
- 1931 : Baleydier by Jean Mamy
- 1931 : Les Amours de minuit by Augusto Genina et Marc Allégret
- 1932 : Fanny by Marc Allégret
- 1934 : L'Atalante, by Jean Vigo
- 1935 : Le commissaire est bon enfant, le gendarme est sans pitié, court métrage de Jacques Becker + coréalisation
- 1937 : Drôle de drame by Marcel Carné
- 1943 : Le soleil a toujours raison by Pierre Billon
- 1943 : Les Deux Timides by Yves Allégret
- 1945 : Félicie Nanteuil by Marc Allégret
