= Guy Decomble =

French actor (1910–1964)

- Born: 12 November 1910; Aulnay-sous-Bois, Seine-Saint-Denis, France
- Died: 14 August 1964 (aged 53); Châtellerault, Vienne, France
- Occupation: Actor
- Years active: 1932–1964 (film & TV)

Guy Decomble (1910–1964) was a French film and television actor. A character actor he played in a number of supporting parts in postwar cinema. One of his better known roles is as the teacher in The 400 Blows by François Truffaut.

== Selected filmography ==
- L'affaire est dans le sac (1932) - Le pasteur (uncredited)
- The Crime of Monsieur Lange (1936) - Typesetter (uncredited)
- The Citadel of Silence (1937) - (uncredited)
- Bizarre, Bizarre (1937) - Le maquereau (uncredited)
- The Cheat (1937) - Un joueur (uncredited)
- The Time of the Cherries (1938) - (uncredited)
- La Bête Humaine (1938) - Le garde-barrière (uncredited)
- The Trump Card (1942) - Un aspirant
- Strange Inheritance (1943) - Robert (uncredited)
- Madame et le mort (1943)
- Goodbye Leonard (1943) - Le rémouleur
- First on the Rope (1944) - Warfield
- Florence est folle (1944) - (uncredited)
- Farandole (1945)
- The Great Pack (1945) - Maître Frouas
- François Villon (1945) - Denisot
- Hanged Man's Farm (1945) - Bénoni
- The Last Penny (1946) - Richard
- Song of the Clouds (1946)
- The Ideal Couple (1946) - Un opérateur
- Patrie (1946) - Un échevin
- Dreams of Love (1947) - Hurau
- Les jeux sont faits (1947) - Poulain
- La maison sous la mer (1947) - Lucien
- The Lost Village (1947) - Jean Pétrat
- A Change in the Wind (1949) - Justin
- Scandal on the Champs-Élysées (1949) - Pascaud
- Jour de fête (1949) - Roger
- Histoires extraordinaires (1949) - Le tueur obsédé
- The Winner's Circle (1950) - Émile
- Captain Ardant (1951) - Jossip
- The House on the Dune (1952)
- The Case Against X (1952)
- We Are All Murderers (1952) - Un inspecteur
- Ouvert contre X (1952) - Le concierge
- Les conquérants solitaires (1952) - (narration)
- Follow That Man (1953) - Emile Kortenwirth
- This Man Is Dangerous (1953) - Jacques le Dingue
- The Unfrocked One (1954) - Le père Mascle
- Dangerous Turning (1954) - M. Léon
- Black Dossier (1955) - L'inspecteur Leroy
- The Aristocrats (1955) - Gustave
- Les assassins du dimanche (1956) - Le brigadier
- Bob le flambeur (1956) - Le commissaire Ledru
- Maigret Sets a Trap (1958) - Mazet
- Thérèse Étienne (1958) - Rothlisberger
- Police judiciaire (1958) - L'inspecteur Mercier
- Les Naufrageurs (1959)
- Guinguette (1959)
- Les Cousins (1959) - Le libraire
- Archimède le clochard (1959) - Le chef de station de la RATP
- The 400 Blows (1959) - 'Petite Feuille' - l'instituteur
- Rue des prairies (1959) - Le père de Paul
- Nathalie, Secret Agent (1959) - Pageot
- The Old Guard (1960) - Le chauffeur du car
- The Nina B. Affair (1961) - Lofting
- Smrt na cukrovém ostrove (1962) - Jean
- The Girls of La Rochelle (1962) - Sire Basile
- Pourquoi Paris? (1962)
- Maigret Sees Red (1963) - Lognon

== Bibliography ==
- Paietta, Ann C. (2007) Teachers in the Movies: A Filmography of Depictions of Grade School, Preschool and Day Care Educators, 1890s to the Present. McFarland.
