= Alexandre Trauner =

Hungarian-born cinema production and set designer

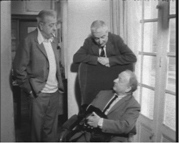
Alexandre Trauner (seated)

Alexandre Trauner (born Sándor Trau; 3 August 1906 in Budapest, Hungary – 5 December 1993 in Omonville-la-Petite, France) was a Hungarian film production designer.

After studying painting at Hungarian Royal Drawing School, he left the country in 1929, fleeing from the antisemitic government of Admiral Horthy. In Paris, he became the assistant of set designer Lazare Meerson, at the studios in Épinay-sur-Seine working on such films as À nous la liberté (1932) and La Kermesse héroïque (1935). In 1937, he became a chief set designer.

Trauner worked with director Marcel Carné for some years on such films as Port of Shadows (Quai des brumes, 1938), Le Jour se lève (1939), and Children of Paradise (Les Enfants du paradis, 1945). Trauner worked in hiding on Children of Paradise, which was filmed at the Victorine Studios in Nice during 1943 and 1944 during the Nazi's Occupation of France.

He worked with Billy Wilder on eight films between 1958 and 1978, including the sets for The Apartment (1960), on which he made use of false perspective, a characteristic of his work. For his work on this film, he won an Academy Award. He also worked on John Huston's The Man Who Would Be King (1975), Joseph Losey's Don Giovanni (1979), and Luc Besson's Subway (1985).

In 1980, he was a member of the jury at the 30th Berlin International Film Festival.

== Filmography ==
- 1934: Sans famille by Marc Allégret (models by R. Gys)
- 1936: Vous n'avez rien à déclarer ? by Léo Joannon (models by R. Gys)
- 1937: Gribouille by Marc Allégret
- 1937: Drôle de drame by Marcel Carné, screenplay by Jacques Prévert
- 1937: La Dame de Malacca by Marc Allégret (oriental sets only, other sets by J. Krauss)
- 1937: Mollenard by Robert Siodmak
- 1938: Port of Shadows by Marcel Carné, screenplay by Jacques Prévert
- 1938: Entrée des artistes by Marc Allégret (models by J. Krauss)
- 1938: Hôtel du Nord by Marcel Carné, dialogue by Henri Jeanson
- 1939: Le jour se lève by Marcel Carné, screenplay by Jacques Prévert and dialogue by Jacques Viot
- 1939: Remorques by Jean Grémillon, screenplay by Jacques Prévert (completed by H. Manessier from original models)
- 1940: Soyez les bienvenus by Jacques de Baroncelli (models by Paul Bertrand)
- 1941: Le soleil a toujours raison by Pierre Billon, screenplay by Jacques Prévert (models by A. Capelier and G. Wakhevitch)
- 1942: Les Visiteurs du soir (+ costumes) by Marcel Carné, screenplay by Jacques Prévert (with G. Wakhevitch)
- 1942: Lumière d'été by Jean Grémillon, screenplay by Jacques Prévert (models by M. Douy)
- 1943: Le Ciel est à vous by Jean Grémillon
- 1943-1944: Les Enfants du paradis by Marcel Carné, screenplay by Jacques Prévert (with L. Barsacq and R. Gabutti)
- 1945: The Misfortunes of Sophie by Jacqueline Audry (models by M. Magniez)
- 1946: Les Portes de la nuit by Marcel Carné, screenplay by Jacques Prévert
- 1946: Dreams of Love by Christian Stengel (models by R. Gys)
- 1946: Mystery Trip by Pierre Prévert, screenplay by Jacques Prévert (models by A. Capelier)
- 1948-1950: Othello by Orson Welles (+ costumes)
- 1949: Manèges by Yves Allégret (models by A. Capelier)
- 1949: La Marie du port by Marcel Carné (models by A. Capelier)
- 1950: Juliette, or Key of Dreams by Marcel Carné, screenplay by Georges Neveux
- 1950: Les Miracles n'ont lieu qu'une fois by Yves Allégret (models by A. Capelier)
- 1951: Torticola contre Frankensberg (short film) by Paul Paviot (models by J. Allan)
- 1951: The Green Glove by Rudolph Maté
- 1951: Les Sept Péchés capitaux: La Luxure by Yves Allégret (models by A. Capelier)
- 1952: Desperate Decision by Yves Allégret
- 1952: Hobson's Choice by David Lean
- 1953: Act of Love by Anatole Litvak
- 1954: Land of the Pharaohs by Howard Hawks
- 1954: Du rififi chez les hommes by Jules Dassin (models by A. Capelier)
- 1955: La Lumière d'en face by Georges Lacombe (models by M. Colasson)
- 1955: Lady Chatterley's Lover by Marc Allégret (models by A. Capelier)
- 1956: The Happy Road by Gene Kelly (models by N. Howard)
- 1956: En effeuillant la marguerite by Marc Allégret (models by A. Capelier)
- 1956: Love in the Afternoon by Billy Wilder
- 1957: Be Beautiful But Shut Up by Marc Allégret (models by A. Capelier)
- 1957: Witness for the Prosecution by Billy Wilder
- 1959: Once More, with Feeling! by Stanley Donen
- 1960: Goodbya Again by Anatole Litvak
- 1961: Romanoff and Juliet by Peter Ustinov
- 1961: Paris Blues by Martin Ritt
- 1961: One, Two, Three by Billy Wilder
- 1961: Five Miles to Midnight by Anatole Litvak
- 1962: Gigot by Gene Kelly (models by A. Capelier)
- 1964: Behold a Pale Horse by Fred Zinnemann
- 1964: Kiss me stupid by Billy Wilder
- 1966: How to Steal a Million by William Wyler
- 1966: The Night of the Generals by Anatole Litvak
- 1968: Uptight by Jules Dassin
- 1968: A Flea in Her Ear by Jacques Charon
- 1969: Promise at Dawn by Jules Dassin
- 1970: Les Mariés de l'an II by Jean-Paul Rappeneau (models by W. Holt)
- 1970: The Private Life of Sherlock Holmes by Billy Wilder
- 1971: Impossible Object by John Frankenheimer
- 1974: The Man Who Would Be King by John Huston
- 1976: La Première fois by Claude Berri
- 1977: Fedora by Billy Wilder
- 1977: Roads to the South by Joseph Losey
- 1978: Don Giovanni by Joseph Losey
- 1979: The Fiendish Plot of Dr. Fu Manchu by Piers Haggard
- 1981: Coup de torchon by Bertrand Tavernier
- 1982: La Truite by Joseph Losey
- 1983: Tchao Pantin by Claude Berri
- 1983: Vive les femmes ! by Claude Confortès
- 1985: Harem by Arthur Joffé
- 1985: Round Midnight by Bertrand Tavernier
- 1986: Le Moustachu by Dominique Chaussois (models by D. Naert)
- 1987: The Bengali Night by Nicolas Klotz (models by D. Naert)
- 1988: Reunion by Jerry Schatzberg (models by D. Naert)
- 1988: Rouget le braconnier by Gilles Cousin (models by P. Duquesne)
- 1989: Comédie d'amour by Jean-Pierre Rawson (models by P. Duquesne)
- 1990: The Rainbow Thief by Alejandro Jodorowsky (models by D. Naert)

== See also ==
- Art Directors Guild Hall of Fame
