= Lucien Raimbourg =

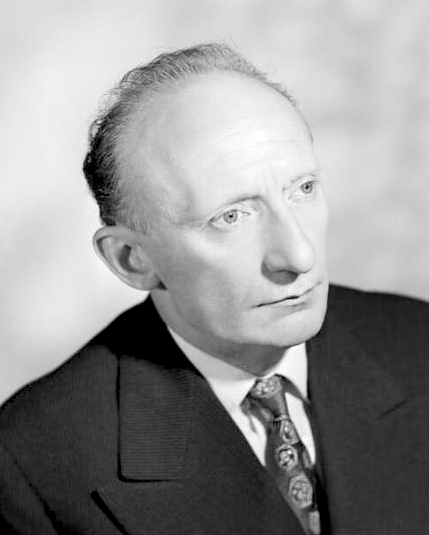
- Raimbourg in 1958
- Born: 14 September 1903; Villeneuve-Saint-Georges, Val-de-Marne, France
- Died: 20 February 1973 (aged 69); Paris, France
- Occupation: Actor
- Years active: 1932-1973 (film)

Lucien Raimbourg (1903–1973) was a French film, stage and television actor. He appeared in the original performance of Samuel Beckett's Waiting for Godot.

== Selected filmography ==
- L'affaire est dans le sac (1932) - Le client myope au chapeau de curé (as Raimbourg)
- Ciboulette (1933)
- Mystery Trip (1947)
- Tout chante autour de moi (1954)
- Naughty Girl (1956)
- He Who Must Die (1957)
- Élisa (1957)
- Not Delivered (1958)
- Serenade of Texas (1958)
- Du rififi chez les femmes (1959)
- The Verdict (1959)
- Twelve Hours By the Clock (1959)
- The Indestructible (1959)
- 125 Rue Montmartre (1959)
- Checkerboard (1959)
- Austerlitz (1960)
- Lovers on a Tightrope (1960)
- Dynamite Jack (1961)
- Spotlight on a Murderer (1961)
- Cartouche (1962)
- Highway Pickup (1963)
- A Question of Honour (1965)
- An Idiot in Paris (1967)
- The Scarlet Lady (1969)
- Peace in the Fields (1970)
- The Devil's Nightmare (1971)

== Bibliography ==
- Deirdre Bair. Samuel Beckett: A Biography. Simon and Schuster, 1990.
