= Je ne sais pas pourquoi (disambiguation) =

"Je ne sais pas pourquoi" is a 1988 single by Kylie Minogue.

Je ne sais pas pourquoi may also refer to:

- "Je ne sais pas pourquoi", French version of "I Don't Know Why (I Just Do)"
- "Je ne sais pas pourquoi", a 1954 song by Mouloudji from the film Tout chante autour de moi
