= Maurice Baquet =

French actor and cellist (1911–2005)

Vernissage Galerie Marguerie, Jean Vimenet With Maurice Baquet (1955)

Maurice Louis Baquet (26 May 1911 – 8 July 2005) was a French actor and cellist.

He was born in Villefranche-sur-Saône and died in Noisy-le-Grand. He studied music at the Conservatoire de Paris in the same class as Henri Betti, Paul Bonneau, Henri Dutilleux and Louiguy.

== Partial filmography ==
- Beautiful Days (1935) - Toto
- Veille d'armes (1935)
- The Crime of Monsieur Lange (1936) - Charles, The Concierges' Son
- Helene (1936) - Durant Tout Court
- Girls of Paris (1936) - Gaston
- The Lower Depths (1936) - Alochka - le fou accordéoniste
- Lady Killer (1937) - Le soldat malade
- Ballerina (1937) - Le machiniste
- The Alibi (1937) - Gérard
- Mollenard (1938) - Le Joueur D'Harmonica
- People Who Travel (1938) - (uncredited)
- Altitude 3.200 (1938) - Arthur
- Final Accord (1938) - Serge Didot
- Place de la Concorde (1939) - Papillon
- Le Grand Élan (1939) - Boulot
- Twisted Mistress (1942) - Firmin
- The Trump Card (1942) - Mickey
- Frederica (1942) - Un ami de Gilbert
- Départ à zéro (1943) - Colibri
- The Exile's Song (1943) - Gaspard 'Pas-Béni'
- Goodbye Leonard (1943) - Le marchand de lampions
- First on the Rope (1944) - Boule
- Coup de tête (1944) - Le chef d'orchestre (uncredited)
- The Last Metro (1945) - Henri Remonge
- Lessons in Conduct (1946) - Jean
- Pas un mot à la reine-mère (1947) - Le reporter
- Mystery Trip (1947) - Teddy
- Les Aventures des Pieds-Nickelés (1948) - Ribouldingue
- Kenzi (1948)
- Memories Are Not for Sale (1948) - Rondo
- Le Trésor des Pieds-Nickelés (1950) - Ribouldingue
- Tire au flanc (1950) - Turlot
- Bibi Fricotin (1951) - Bibi Fricotin
- The Dream of Andalusia (1951) - Pepe
- Innocents in Paris (1953)
- L'Impossible Monsieur Pipelet (1955) - Jojo
- A Night at the Moulin Rouge (1957)
- Le Voyage En Ballon (1960) - L'aide
- Mandrin (1962) - Court-Toujours
- Le Prince de Madrid (1967) - Paquito
- Z (1969) - Le maçon héroïque
- Section spéciale (1975) - Marcel Parinet, un secrétaire du Parquet général
- Attention les yeux! (1976) - Un flic
- Monsieur Klein (1976) - Un musicien (uncredited)
- Bobby Deerfield (1977) - (uncredited)
- Jacques Prévert (1977) - Himself
- Fedora (1978) - Cello Player at the Funeral Wake (uncredited)
- The Adolescent (1979) - Jules, le cantonnier
- Le Divorcement (1979) - Le luthier
- Le Roi des cons (1981) - Le patron de l'hôtel de passe
- Madame Claude 2 (1981) - Le professeur de Violoncelle
- Tête à claques (1982) - Le voisin
- Salut... j'arrive! (1982) - L'homme au violoncelle
- The Angel (1982) - Le premier bibliothécaire
- Vive la sociale! (1983) - Monsieur Jo
- Vive les femmes! (1984) - Albert, le patron du café
- Les Rois du gag (1985) - Robert
- Strictement personnel (1985) - Le concierge
- Paulette, la pauvre petite milliardaire (1986) - Le père de Joseph
- Le Débutant (1986) - Maurice
- Roulez jeunesse! (1993) - François
- La Braconne (1993) - Le grand-père
- Délit mineur (1994) - Douchet
- Oui (1995) - Le musicien muet
- Dieu seul me voit (1998) - M. Crémieux
