= Marcel Duhamel =

French publisher and actor (1900–1977)

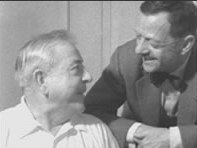
- Duhamel (right) with Jacques Prévert
- Born: 16 July 1900; Paris, France
- Died: 6 March 1977 (aged 76); Saint-Laurent-du-Var, France
- Occupations: Actor; Screenwriter
- Years active: 1933–1966
- Known for: The Crime of Monsieur Lange

Marcel Duhamel (16 July 1900 – 6 March 1977) was a French actor and screenwriter, founder of the Série noire publishing imprint.

He played The Foreman in Jean Renoir's 1936 The Crime of Monsieur Lange.

In 1953 he was credited as screenplay writer for This Man Is Dangerous, a French film adaptation of Peter Cheyney's novel of the same name.

He translated and published Jim Thompson's 1964 pulp novel Pop. 1280 as 1275 Âmes ("souls") in French in 1966. Thereafter, the book was transposed to French colonial Africa in Bertrand Tavernier's film Coup de Torchon (Clean Slate) in 1981. He also translated (with Maurice-Edgar Coindreau) John Steinbeck's The Grapes of Wrath. Coindreau in an interview credited Duhamel with the bulk of the translation, noting that he himself had translated only about sixty pages of it.

== Selected filmography ==
- Ciboulette (1933)
- Hotel Free Exchange (1934)
- Moutonnet (1936)
- Crossroads (1938)
- The Emigrant (1940)
- Tobias Is an Angel (1940)
- Remorques (1941)
- Strange Inheritance (1943)
- This Man Is Dangerous (1953)
- Interpol Against X (1960)
