= It's in the Bag =

It's in the Bag can refer to:

- It's in the Bag, a pricing game on The Price Is Right
- It's in the Bag (game show), a long-running New Zealand game show
- L'affaire est dans le sac (English: It's in the Bag), a 1932 French film
- It's in the Bag (1936 film), a British film
- It's in the Bag (1944 film), a British film
- It's in the Bag! (1945 film), a 1945 American film starring Fred Allen
