= Ciboulette (film) =

1933 film

- Directed by: Claude Autant-Lara
- Written by: Francis de Croisset (operetta); Robert de Flers (operetta); Jacques Prévert; Claude Autant-Lara
- Starring: Simone Berriau; Robert Burnier; Armand Dranem
- Cinematography: Charles Bauer; Curt Courant
- Edited by: Henri Taverna; André Versein
- Music by: Reynaldo Hahn
- Production companies: Cipar Films; Pathé Consortium Cinéma
- Distributed by: Pathé Consortium Cinéma
- Release date: 10 November 1933
- Running time: 85 minutes
- Country: France
- Language: French

Ciboulette (French pronunciation: [sibulɛt]) is a 1933 French musical film directed by Claude Autant-Lara and starring Simone Berriau, Robert Burnier and Armand Dranem. It is an adaptation of the 1923 operetta of the same name. The film's art direction was by Lazare Meerson and Alexandre Trauner. It was part of a popular cycle of operetta films during the decade.

== Cast ==
- Simone Berriau as Ciboulette
- Robert Burnier as Antonin
- Armand Dranem as Le père Grenu
- André Urban as Monsieur Duparquet
- Madeleine Guitty as La mère Pingret
- Pomiès as Olivier Métra
- Thérèse Dorny as Zénobie
- Guy Ferrant as Roger de Lansquenet
- Marcel Duhamel as Le voleur
- Jacques Prévert as L'Âne
- Ginette Leclerc as Une cocotte
- Viviane Romance as Une cocotte
- Monique Joyce as Une cocotte
- Christiane Dor as La servante
- Marie-Jacqueline Chantal as Une invitée chez Métra
- Charles Camus as Grisart
- Louis Florencie as Trancher
- Pedro Elviro as Arthur et Meyer
- Lucien Raimbourg as Victor
- Raymond Bussières as Un clochard
- Eugène Stuber as Un fort des halles et un faune
- Pépa Cara
- Robert Casa
- Andrée Doria
- Gazelle
- Jean Lods
- Max Morise
- Léon Moussinac
- Pierre Sabas

== Bibliography ==
- Goble, Alan. The Complete Index to Literary Sources in Film. Walter de Gruyter, 1999.
