= Two Timid Souls =

Two Timid Souls may refer to:

- Two Timid Souls (1928 film)
- Two Timid Souls (1943 film)
