= The Transgressors =

1961 novel by Jim Thompson

- First edition
- Author: Jim Thompson
- Language: English
- Genre: Crime novel
- Publisher: Signet
- Publication date: 1961
- Publication place: United States
- Media type: Print
- Pages: 248 pp

The Transgressors is a crime novel by Jim Thompson, published in 1961. It is one of a very few Thompson novels to feature a traditional love story as a major part of the plot where the lovers have a happy ending together rather than one murdering or betraying the other as is the norm in most of Thompson's novels. As with most of Thompson's novels it takes place in the Southwest (Texas) where Thompson grew up and it leverages Thompson's diverse life experiences in creating the characters and situations in a community dominated by the oil industry.

== Plot ==
The Transgressors opens with deputy sheriff Tom Lord riding on a Texas road with the town prostitute Joyce Lakewood. They are lovers and Lord treats her more respectfully than any man Joyce has been with but he refuses to marry her. This leads to them alternately trading insults and flirting. As they argue it is made clear that although he talks like a local with little education, Lord is highly educated. He almost completed medical school when he was forced to drop out to care for his sick father. His father lingered on for years requiring Lord's full-time care and as a temporary way to bring in money Lord took a job as a deputy sheriff. The job turned out to be permanent as by the time his father died Lord felt he was too old to return to school and he uses his clownish yokel way of talking to blend in with the rest of the men in the sheriff's office.

Joyce and Lord have a minor accident. The look on Lord's face after the accident reminds Joyce of another time he had such an intense look and she remembers a feud he had with Aaron McBride, a supervisor for the Highlands Oil and Gas company. There was oil on land that Lord owned and he signed a contract with McBride to have Highlands drill the oil. However, Highlands swindled him by a loophole in the contract. As a result, Lord waited for an opportunity to take revenge on McBride. When McBride wore a gun on his hip into town Lord confronted him for wearing a gun without a permit. McBride pushed Lord into a storefront. This was the opening Lord was looking for and he quickly pummeled McBride. From that point on McBride was a different man. He never came into Lord's town again but he swore that if he saw Lord outside of Lord's legal jurisdiction he would kill him.

Joyce recalls this story as Lord pulls their car off the road. They are in the middle of the desert but Lord spots a wildcat well near by. As they walk towards the well Joyce and Lord see a sign indicating it is a Highlands well supervised by McBride. Joyce tries to dissuade Lord from approaching it but he uses his mock ignorant humor to deflect her pleas. As they approach the well they are greeted by two Highlands workers named Curly and Red who know Lord. They help him repair his car and are almost finished when McBride comes to supervise the site. On seeing Lord McBride is overcome with rage. McBride pulls his gun. Lord never carries a gun so he rushes toward McBride hoping to disarm him before he can fire. The two struggle and McBride is shot and killed.

Curly, Red, and Joyce all tell Lord that they will support him and corroborate that Lord acted in self defense. Lord thinks that their testimony will not be believed since they are all known to be his friends. Instead he asks them to simply say nothing unless they are questioned and to let McBride's body be discovered by some other Highlands employee.

Lord drops Joyce off at her home and then goes directly to the court house where he confesses to his boss sheriff Bradley that he has killed McBride. For quite some time Bradley has had a growing hostility to Lord because it is an open secret that Lord really runs the sheriff's office and the Bradley is just a figurehead. Bradley takes Lord's confession as an opening to come down on him. However, rather than act contrite as Bradley expects, Lord reacts with rage and abruptly quits his job as deputy. As he storms out of the court house Bradley calls after him to come back in vain. Bradley's tone goes from pleading to threatening as he tells Lord that he will get no special favors if Bradley is pressed to investigate McBride's death. Lord returns home and goes on an alcoholic bender, remaining drunk for several days.

The novel then changes scenes to the story of McBride's young wife Donna and the corruption of Highlands. When her husband was killed Donna was already in the hospital having a C-section for what would be her first child with McBride. While in the hospital Donna received the news that her child died after the procedure and then that her husband is dead. Donna doesn't believe that her husband committed suicide and goes to various people in Highlands demanding an investigation. She receives no satisfaction from Highlands but her demands make the Italian mobsters who actually run the company nervous that their illegal activities associated with Highlands will be discovered. The man really in charge of Highlands is August Pellino. He mistakenly comes down hard on the figurehead boss of Highlands who kills himself as a result. This means there are now two apparent suicides of senior Highlands employees making the mobsters who Pellino reports to nervous. Pellino is made to realize by his associates that he must see that Lord takes the fall for McBride's death.

In the meantime, Donna comes to Lord's town attempting to get answers. She ends up at Lord's home, lured in by the doctor's shingle that Lord's great grandfather put on the house and the door which Lord always leaves open. Lord can tell that she is near exhaustion and gives her a shot to make her sleep. As he does so, she assumes Lord is his dead father who was a doctor. As Donna sleeps Lord looks through her handbag and finds a loaded gun which he correctly assumes she purchased to kill her husband's murderer. Donna is appalled when she wakes up and discovers that Lord not only gave her the shot but undressed her and put her to bed. She is alternately enraged and amused by Lord's clownish replies to her questions. Eventually, after eating a meal Lord prepared for her she succumbs to her exhaustion and falls back into a natural sleep.

Lord comes to realize that Pellino has come to town and that the gangster is trying to discretely keep tabs on him. Lord recognizes Pellino from a mug book of known criminals. Lord drives out of town all the time amused that he knows Pellino is following him even though Pellino clearly thinks his prey is still unaware of his presence. Lord takes refuge in a small shack in the Texas desert and notes that Pellino follows him.

Meanwhile, Donna wakes up in Lord's home. She finds a humorous note that Lord left her and continues to go from anger to amusement when thinking of him. She is grateful for his kind treatment but angered by his clownish behavior. She leaves Lord's house and talks to sheriff Bradley. Bradley implicates Lord as her husband's murderer. Donna then meets Pellino who masquerades as a friend of her husband's from Highlands and also implicates Lord and drives Donna to the shack where Lord is staying. Pellino believes that either Donna will kill Lord or Lord will have to kill Donna in self defense, either way making the focus for McBride's death move away from Highlands to Lord. Donna meets Lord at the remote shack and tells him she has come to kill him. Lord makes jokes rather than claiming he is innocent and this infuriates Donna. She shoots Lord at point blank range several times and Lord falls to the floor with agonizing screams. As soon as she fires Donna regrets her decision. She realizes that she's been manipulated to think Lord murdered her husband without any actual evidence. As she weeps over his body Lord jumps up from the floor of the shack and says "Look ma, no holes!". He changed the bullets in her gun to blanks when she was sleeping.

Donna believes Lord's story that the death of her husband was a result of Lord defending himself. She is exhausted from her recent C-section and sleeps in Lord's little cabin. Meanwhile, a gunman who isn't identified finds Pellino and takes him to the tool shed for the wildcat well where McBride was killed. He locks Pellino in the shed. Pellino realizes he can easily break down the door but he decides that is what his assailant is expecting so instead he removes the floor boards and tries to crawl underneath the shed to a spot where he could escape without being seen. However, the shed has a den of rattlesnakes living beneath it. Pellino is attacked by a swarm of snakes and dies in agony from their bites. Pellino's presence in town is soon followed by four other mobsters who have been following Pellino and will kill him and Lord if Pellino fails to. They are all ambushed and killed as they drive out to Lord's shack.

Donna thinks that Lord killed these men and Lord exhibits his usual arrogance that she might even think such a thing. Lord realizes that the real killers are coming for him next and tries to get Donna to safety but she stubbornly refuses to leave. He goes out to confront the killers who turn out to be Curly and Red, the two wildcat oil workers whose boss Tom killed. Although they hated McBride, his death and the subsequent troubles with Highldands made it impossible for them to get money and as time went by they blamed Lord and developed a scheme to frame him for the murders they committed. Lord manages to kill Curly but Red has him cornered when a rifle shot comes from nowhere and shoots Red in the arm. Donna refused to follow Lord's order to remain safe in their shack and saves his life. At first Lord is furious with her and they argue some more but eventually he realizes how foolish he is to be angry with someone who saved his life and the novel ends as they realize they are both in love with each other.

== Background ==
The Transgressors started from a contract Thompson received to write a novelization of a movie. The movie was to be titled Cloudburst and was about a woman in the old American west who sets out to find her husband's murderer and ends up falling in love with him. Thompson began writing the novel but he changed major parts of the film script. For example, he changed the setting from the 1800s old west to present day (1961) Texas, Swedish con men to Italian mobsters, and the ending from a melodramatic death of the protagonist into a happy ending. Rather than killing her husband's killer, she marries him. This generated significant push back from his publisher but ultimately the movie Cloudburst was never filmed which made correspondence between the novel and the film script irrelevant. However, Thompson still felt push back from his publishers who wanted him to continue the noir fiction style that he had cultivated in previous books rather than to tell a traditional romantic story with a happy ending.

== Themes ==
The character of the deputy sheriff who plays the fool but is in reality highly intelligent appeared in four of Thompson's novels. In addition to The Transgressors, the character appeared in Wild Town, The Killer Inside Me and Pop. 1280. In Wild Town as in The Transgressors, the sheriff was a heroic figure, a man who though highly intelligent and capable of achieving much more was forced by circumstances to take a job that was beneath his intelligence and who played the fool as a way to fit in with his less educated co-workers. In the novels The Killer Inside Me and Pop. 1280, the sheriff was a sociopath who used his clowning and the fact that people assumed he was a fool as a way to manipulate others and get away with crimes including multiple murders.

The sheriff character was partly inspired by Thompson's father who was also a sheriff and who was an expert at manipulating people. Also, like the character Thompson's father put on a veneer of a friendly easy going man but underneath was highly cynical and almost misanthropic in his view of humanity. The sheriff character was also partly inspired by an experience Thompson had with an actual deputy who arrested him when he neglected to pay a fine for being drunk and disturbing the peace.
