= The Unfrocked One =

1954 film

- Directed by: Léo Joannon
- Written by: Léo Joannon; Roland Laudenbach; Denys de La Patellière
- Produced by: Alain Poiré; Roger Ribadeau-Dumas
- Starring: Pierre Fresnay
- Cinematography: Nikolai Toporkoff
- Edited by: Monique Isnardon
- Music by: Jean-Jacques Grunenwald
- Color process: Société Française de Cinématographic; Société Nouvelle des Établissements Gaumont
- Distributed by: Gaumont
- Release date: 26 February 1954
- Running time: 107 minutes
- Country: France
- Language: French

The Unfrocked One (French: Le Défroqué) is a 1954 French drama film directed by Léo Joannon. At the 4th Berlin International Film Festival it won the Bronze Berlin Bear award.

== Cast ==
- Pierre Fresnay as Maurice Morand
- Pierre Trabaud as Gérard Lacassagne
- Nicole Stéphane as Catherine Grandpré
- Marcelle Géniat as Mme. Morand
- Jacques Fabbri as L'ordonnance
- Abel Jacquin as Le père supérieur
- Georges Lannes as Le colonel
- Renaud Mary as L'antiquaire
- Guy Decomble as Le père Mascle
- René Havard as Un officier
- Christian Lude as Le chanoine Jusseaume
- Léo Joannon as Le chanoine Jousseaume
- Olivier Darrieux as Edoard
- Sylvie Février as La soeur de Gérard
- René Blancard as M. Lacassagne
