= Wild Town =

1957 crime novel by Jim Thompson

- First edition
- Author: Jim Thompson
- Language: English
- Genre: Crime novel
- Publisher: Signet
- Publication date: 1957
- Publication place: United States
- Media type: Print
- Pages: 144 pp (first edition, paperback)

Wild Town is a crime novel by Jim Thompson, published in 1957. It weaves together threads of murder, embezzlement, blackmail, and seduction in the post oil boom West Texas of the 1920s. The various locations (a hotel, the towns that grow around oil sites) and characters (Bellboys, Sheriff, Oil Wildcatter) are all highly influenced by Thompson's jobs and homes growing up and living in Oklahoma and Texas.

== Plot ==
"Bugs" McKenna, a hard luck tough guy, refuses to let people belittle him or treat him unfairly even if it means he suffers for it. Bugs is rousted from town to town in West Texas by the local law until he makes his way to Ragtown, a small town built around oil wells. The wealthiest man in Ragtown is Mike Hanlon, a wildcatter who discovered the oil and built a town around it, including the only hotel, where Hanlon lives. However, the man who really runs the town is the sheriff, Lou Ford.

Bugs provokes a confrontation with one of Ford's deputies and ends up in jail. Expecting a beating, Bugs is treated decently and even offered a job working security in Hanlon's hotel. Hanlon is afraid that his young wife is trying to kill him and that Ford may be working for her. Bugs is unsure if he has been hired by Ford to protect or kill Hanlon.

His natural inclination is to be distrustful, so he suspects the worst of Ford. Bugs becomes involved in the murder of the hotel's auditor made to look like a suicide, the embezzlement of $5,000 from the hotel, as well as various illicit sexual encounters. At the same time Bugs begins to appreciate how well-suited he is to his job and how enjoyable it is to actually have stable employment. Bugs is even beginning to develop a love life with Ford's school teacher ex-fiancé.

The question driving the plot is whether Hanlon's wife Joyce is really trying to have him killed and, if so, is Sheriff Ford trying to help her or catch her? Bugs eventually takes a stand to protect Mr. Hanlon regardless of whether Ford wants him to or not. It is this decision that Ford was waiting for—to know if he could really trust Bugs. Once Bugs and Ford are revealed as working on the same side, the rest of the threads of the plot unwind, thanks to Ford's work and perceptive insights into people. He realizes that Joyce is actually a gold digger who came to Ragtown hoping to get money from Hanlon, but as she started to con him she actually fell in love with him. However, the real villain, who killed the hotel auditor and embezzled the money from the hotel, is revealed to be another con woman named Rosalie Vara, a light-skinned black woman who came to Ragtown with Joyce and is now working as a maid at the hotel. She was not about to let Joyce enjoy all of Hanlon's money. She put on a very convincing veneer of a naive, sweet, and innocent young woman. In reality she hatched several different schemes to embezzle from the hotel and then cover it up by murder; first trying to make that murder look like a suicide, and then manipulating Bugs to take the fall. She reveals herself to Bugs just before she knocks him unconscious and stuffs him in a closet.

Bugs recovers consciousness in a hospital room with Mr. Hanlon who now realizes that Ford was out to protect him all along. Ford is there to explain the whole plot like a stereotypical hero in a detective novel. His key realization was that Rosalie Vara's description may not have resulted in any outstanding warrants because she was described as a negro. When Ford removed that from the description he was flooded with information about a con woman wanted for several crimes who otherwise matched Rosalie. She was pretending to be black to hide from the law. Unlike most of Thompson's novels the ending is happy and upbeat.

== Themes ==
As with virtually all of his fiction, Thompson incorporated many aspects of his life into the novel. "Rag Town" was the original name of Anadarko, Oklahoma where Thompson was born. The character of Bugs: a man who perceives himself as a principled tough guy but in reality makes trouble for himself, and feels like a failure, is similar to the way Thompson describes himself in his essay "An Alcoholic Looks at Himself". In some ways Bugs is a reflection of how Thompson viewed himself.

The many details and sordid goings-on at the Hanlon hotel reflect Thompson's first job at 17 as a bell boy at a seedy hotel where the bellhops made more through various illegal transactions then through their actual salary.

The character of the sheriff who plays the fool but is in reality highly intelligent was inspired by Thompson's father and by an encounter Thompson had with a deputy sheriff in Texas. This character is used several times by Thompson. Sometimes, as in this novel and The Transgressors, the sheriff is heroic, a highly intelligent man forced by circumstances to take a job that does not allow him to take full advantage of his abilities. He plays at being a clown to fit in to his role and to manipulate people for altruistic ends. In the novels The Killer Inside Me and Pop.1280 the sheriff is also highly intelligent while playing the fool but uses this persona to manipulate and murder people.

In his autobiographical book Bad Boy Thompson said this character was based on an actual deputy who pursued him when he neglected to pay a fine for being drunk and disturbing the peace. As recounted in a New York Times article, Thompson describes the encounter he had with the deputy:

Alone with him on the vast prairie, the deputy becomes a creature of menace: "Lived here all my life. . . . Everyone knows me. No one knows you. And we're all alone. What do you make o' that, a smart fella like you? . . . What do you think an ol' stupid country boy might do in a case like this?"

The deputy grins, puts on a pair of gloves, smacks a fist into the palm of his other hand.

"I'll tell you something. . . . Tell you a couple of things. There ain't no way of telling what a man is by looking at him. There ain't no way of knowing what he'll do if he has the chance. You think maybe you can remember that?"

In Wild Town, Sheriff Lou Ford makes a particular ritual of putting on leather gloves when he is getting ready to have a serious fight.
