= Farewell Love! =

1943 film

- Directed by: Gianni Franciolini
- Written by: Sergio Amidei; Edoardo Anton; Gherardo Gherardi; Giorgio Pastina
- Based on: Addio, amore! by Matilde Serao
- Produced by: Vincenzo Genesi
- Starring: Jacqueline Laurent; Clara Calamai; Roldano Lupi
- Cinematography: Carlo Montuori
- Edited by: Mario Serandrei
- Music by: Enzo Masetti
- Production companies: Cineconsorzio; Fauno Film; Lux Film
- Distributed by: Lux Film
- Release date: 31 December 1943
- Running time: 88 minutes
- Country: Italy
- Language: Italian

Farewell Love! (Italian: Addio, amore!) is a 1943 Italian historical drama film directed by Gianni Franciolini and starring Jacqueline Laurent, Clara Calamai and Roldano Lupi. It is based on the 1890 novel of the same title by Matilde Serao.

It was shot at the Scalera Studios in Rome. The film's sets were designed by the art director Gastone Medin.

== Cast ==
- Jacqueline Laurent as Anna Acquaviva
- Clara Calamai as Laura Acquaviva
- Roldano Lupi as Cesare Dias
- Leonardo Cortese as Luigi Caracciolo
- Renato Cialente as Carafa
- Giuseppe Rinaldi as Giustino Morelli
- Evelina Paoli as La signora Stella Martini
- Dhia Cristiani as Sofia
- Nando Tamberlani as Il maggiordomo di casa Caracciolo
- Riccardo Fellini as Un amico di Luigi
- Olinto Cristina as Il dottore Montechiaro
- Peppino Spadaro as Il cameriere di casa Acquaviva
- Vanni Torrigiani as Il cameriere di casa Dias
- Cosetta Greco as La cameriera di casa Dias

== Bibliography ==
- Gundle, Stephen. Fame Amid the Ruins: Italian Film Stardom in the Age of Neorealism. Berghahn Books, 2019.
