= The Emigrant (1940 film) =

1940 film

- Film poster
- Directed by: Léo Joannon
- Written by: Yves Allégret; Jean Aurenche; Jacques Companéez; Herbert Juttke; Léo Joannon; André-Paul Antoine
- Produced by: Antoine de Rouvre; Roger De Venloo; Raymond Eger; Alexandre Mnouchkine; Jacques Schwob-d'Héricourt
- Starring: Edwige Feuillère; Jean Chevrier; Georges Lannes
- Cinematography: Eugen Schüfftan
- Edited by: Yvonne Martin
- Music by: Michel Michelet
- Production companies: Compagnie Commerciale Française Cinématographique; Films Vega
- Distributed by: La Société des Films Sirius
- Release date: 14 March 1940
- Running time: 109 minutes
- Country: France
- Language: French

The Emigrant (French: L'émigrante) is a 1940 French comedy film directed by Léo Joannon and starring Edwige Feuillère, Jean Chevrier and Georges Lannes. It was shot at the Epinay Studios in Paris. The film's sets were designed by the art director Robert-Jules Garnier.

== Synopsis ==
Christiane runs a bar in Antwerp which is frequented by the smuggler Tino. After killing a customs officer, he steals her jewellery and flees. She informs on him to the police, but he manages to escape and comes looking for revenge against her. She joins a group of emigrants leaving on a ship for South Africa as a stowaway. Hiding in the cabin of one of the crew, she gradually falls in love with him.

== Cast ==
- Edwige Feuillère as Christiane Vallier
- Jean Chevrier as François Champart
- Georges Lannes as Tino
- Foun-Sen as L'Annamite aux béquilles
- Palmyre Levasseur as La religieuse de l'hospice de Lisbonne
- Jacques Vitry as Le commissaire
- Edmond Van Daële as Un émigrant
- Philippe Richard as Le médecin-chef
- Serge Nadaud as Un officier
- Marcel Pérès as Gaston - un émigrant
- Marcel Duhamel
- Duluard
- Robert Brunet
- Paul Lluís
- Génia Vaury as Madame Vermeersch
- Hélène Dassonville as Eliane
- Gaston Jacquet as Un officier
- Roger Capellani as Un émigrant
- Emile Saulieu
- Jean d'Yd as L'ingénieur-chef
- Åke Engfeldt as L'émigrant suédois
- Pierre Juvenet as Le représentant de la compagnie
- René Charles
- Maurice Marceau
- Roger Bontemps as Vermeersch
- Pierre Larquey as Monrozat
- Raymond Aimos as Un employé du bateau
- Charles Bouillaud
- Bernard La Jarrige as Le journaliste
- Frédéric Mariotti as Un émigrant
- Robert Ozanne as L'ami de Tino
- Forde Willis as L'architecte

== Bibliography ==
- Monaco, James. The Encyclopedia of Film. Perigee Books, 1991.
