= Jacqueline Laurent =

French actress

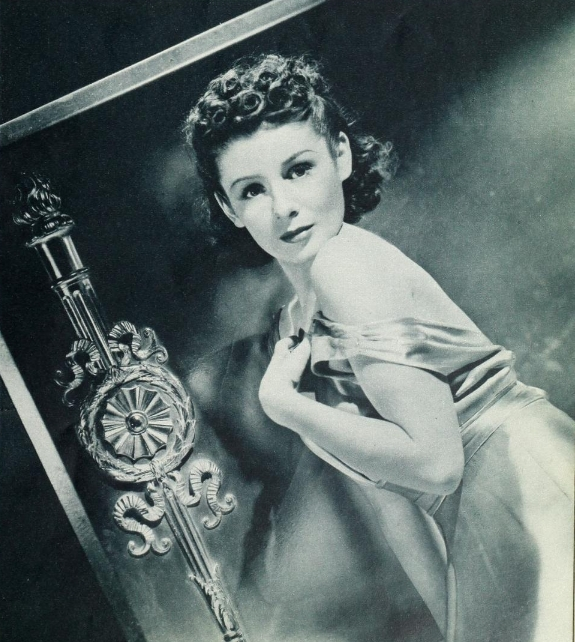
- Laurent as she was pictured in Photoplay magazine's August 1938 issue.
- Born: 6 August 1918; Brienne-le-Château, Aube, France
- Died: 18 December 2009 (aged 91); Grasse, Alpes-Maritimes, France
- Other name: Jacqueline Suzanne Janin
- Occupation: Actor
- Years active: 1935–1965 (film)

Jacqueline Laurent (6 August 1918 – 18 December 2009) was a French film actress. She starred with Jean Gabin in Marcel Carné's Le jour se lève (1939).

== Early years ==
Laurent was the daughter of Jacques Janin, a composer whose compositions included music for films.

== Film ==
After seeing one of Laurent's French films, Louis B. Mayer suggested that she try acting in Hollywood. That suggestion led to her American film debut in Judge Hardy's Children (1938).

== Personal life ==
Laurent was married when she was 16 and divorced soon after.

== Selected filmography ==
- Gaspard de Besse (1935)
- Sarati the Terrible (1937)
- Judge Hardy's Children (1938)
- Le Jour Se Lève (1939)
- The Italian Straw Hat (1941)
- The Man Who Played with Fire (1942)
- Farewell Love! (1943)
- Two Timid Souls (1943)
- L'abito nero da sposa (1945)
- The Ways of Sin (1946)
