= The Ménard Collection =

1944 film

- Directed by: Bernard Roland
- Written by: Jacques Viot
- Produced by: Léo Joannon
- Starring: Lucien Baroux; Suzy Prim; Suzanne Dehelly
- Cinematography: Nikolai Toporkoff
- Edited by: Charlotte Guilbert
- Music by: Tony Aubin
- Production company: Maítrise Artisanale de l'Industrie Cinematographique
- Distributed by: La Société des Films Sirius
- Release date: 12 April 1944
- Running time: 86 minutes
- Country: France
- Language: French

The Ménard Collection (French: La collection Ménard) is a 1944 French comedy film directed by Bernard Roland and starring Lucien Baroux, Suzy Prim and Suzanne Dehelly. It was shot at the François 1er Studios in Paris. The film's sets were designed by the art director Robert Dumesnil.

== Synopsis ==
Renée a young woman from Indochina arrives in Paris in search of her father who she has never met and knows only by his surname Ménard. Using the phone book she attempts to hunt him down, meeting a whole collection of Ménards with varying professions and personalities none of whom prove to be her father.

== Cast ==
- Lucien Baroux as Le conservateur du musée de mathématiques
- Suzy Prim as Madame Ménard
- Suzanne Dehelly as Dora
- Foun-Sen as Renée Ménard
- Jean Tissier as L'employé de l'état civil
- Pierre Larquey as Le psychiatre fou
- Jean Brochard as Le guide
- Jean Périer as Le vieillard
- Jean Mercanton as Paul - le jeune sportif
- René Génin as Le clochard
- Marguerite Deval as Madame veuve Ménard
- Marcelle Monthil as Un amie de la veuve Ménard
- Gabrielle Fontan as La concierge
- Maximilienne as Une demoiselle Ménard
- Julienne Paroli as Un amie de la veuve Ménard
- Charles Lemontier as Le maître d'hôtel
- Louis Florencie as Le commissaire
- Georges Bever as Le garçon de café
- Jean Morel as Le président
- [acques Meyran as Le médecin du vieillard
- Max Dalban as L'assistant
- Édouard Delmont as Le colonial
- Marguerite Moreno as La romancière
- Robert Le Vigan as Amédée Garbure

== Bibliography ==
- Bertin-Maghit, Jean Pierre. Le cinéma français sous Vichy: les films français de 1940 à 1944. Revue du Cinéma Albatros, 1980.
- Rège, Philippe. Encyclopedia of French Film Directors, Volume 1. Scarecrow Press, 2009.
