= Fort du Fou =

- Film poster
- Directed by: Leo Joannon
- Written by: Georges Kessel; Leo Joannon
- Starring: Jacques Harden; Alain Saury; Jean Rochefort
- Cinematography: Pierre Petit
- Edited by: Christian Gaudin
- Music by: André Hossein
- Distributed by: Adelphia Compagnia Cinematografica; Borderie
- Release date: 11 July 1963
- Running time: 85 minutes
- Country: France
- Language: French

Fort du fou is a 1963 Italian/French international co-production war film set during the First Indochina War co-written and directed by Leo Joannon. American International Pictures released the film straight to American television in 1965 under the title Outpost in Indochina.

== Cast ==
- Jacques Harden as Capitaine Noyelles
- Alain Saury as Lieutenant Veyrac
- Jean Rochefort as Sergent Hérange
- Foun-Sen as Xuan
- Jean-Loup Reynold as Private Bernard Jules
- Mai-Trung as The Priest
- Van Quynh as Chief of the Viet Minh
- Stan Dylik as Chief Adjutant Prétot
- Laurent Dumm as Sergent Durrieu
- Le Bâ Dat as Sergent Minh
- Paul Luu Dinh as Lu Banh
- Nguyen Thi Tuyet as Marie Phuong
- Michel Charrel as Private Vincent
- Robert Maurice as Private Masson
- François Brincourt as. Private Isnard
