= Le jour se lève =

1939 French film directed by Marcel Carné

- Directed by: Marcel Carné
- Written by: Jacques Prévert; Jacques Viot
- Produced by: Robert and Raymond Hakim
- Starring: Jean Gabin; Jules Berry; Arletty; Jacqueline Laurent
- Cinematography: Philippe Agostini; André Bac; Albert Viguier; Curt Courant
- Edited by: René Le Hénaff
- Music by: Maurice Jaubert
- Distributed by: AFE
- Release date: 9 June 1939
- Running time: 93 min.
- Country: France
- Language: French

Le jour se lève ([lə ʒuʁ sə lɛv], "The day rises"; also known as Daybreak) is a 1939 French film directed by Marcel Carné and written by Jacques Prévert, based on a story by Jacques Viot. It is considered one of the principal examples of the French film movement known as poetic realism.

An original feature of the film is its structure, a long flashback, a procedure that was rarely used at the time—and this two years before the release of Orson Welles' Citizen Kane. The set for the bedroom, built by Alexandre Trauner, includes all four sides of the room (rather than the usual three) to allow circular shots and emphasise the sense of confinement.

In 1952, it was included in the first British Film Institute's Sight & Sound top ten Greatest Films of All Time list.

== Synopsis ==
Foundry worker François shoots and kills Valentin. François then locks himself in his apartment. He is soon besieged by the police, who fail in an attempt to shoot their way into the room. As they regroup to decide how to apprehend him, François begins to reminisce on how he came to be in this predicament.

Several months earlier, he had begun to date Françoise, a florist's assistant. They bonded over the similarities in their names and the fact that they both were orphans. François fell in love with her and hoped to marry her, but she turned him down in order to have a relationship with the older Valentin, a narcissistic, manipulative dog trainer. Embittered, François began a relationship with Clara, Valentin's former assistant in his dog show. Over the next few weeks, Clara fell in love with François, but he preferred to have only a casual relationship with her; she knew it was because he had continued to see Françoise, with whom he was still in love. One day, Valentin told François that he was in fact Françoise's father; she was the product of a youthful dalliance. Later that afternoon, François asked Françoise if Valentin was telling the truth. She denied it, saying that Valentin habitually made up stories. But she also confessed that she was falling in love with François and wanted to be with him.

Valentin confronted François in his apartment. He admitted to having lied about being Françoise's father and brandished a gun with which he had intended to shoot François. Instead, he taunted François with allusions to his sexual encounters with Françoise. Enraged, François picked up the gun and shot Valentin.

Alone in his room and out of cigarettes, François realizes he has no hope of escape. He does not know that Françoise, delirious with guilt, is now being tended to by Clara. The police decide to throw tear gas into François's room in an attempt to subdue him. But just before they do, François commits suicide by shooting himself in the heart.

== Cast ==
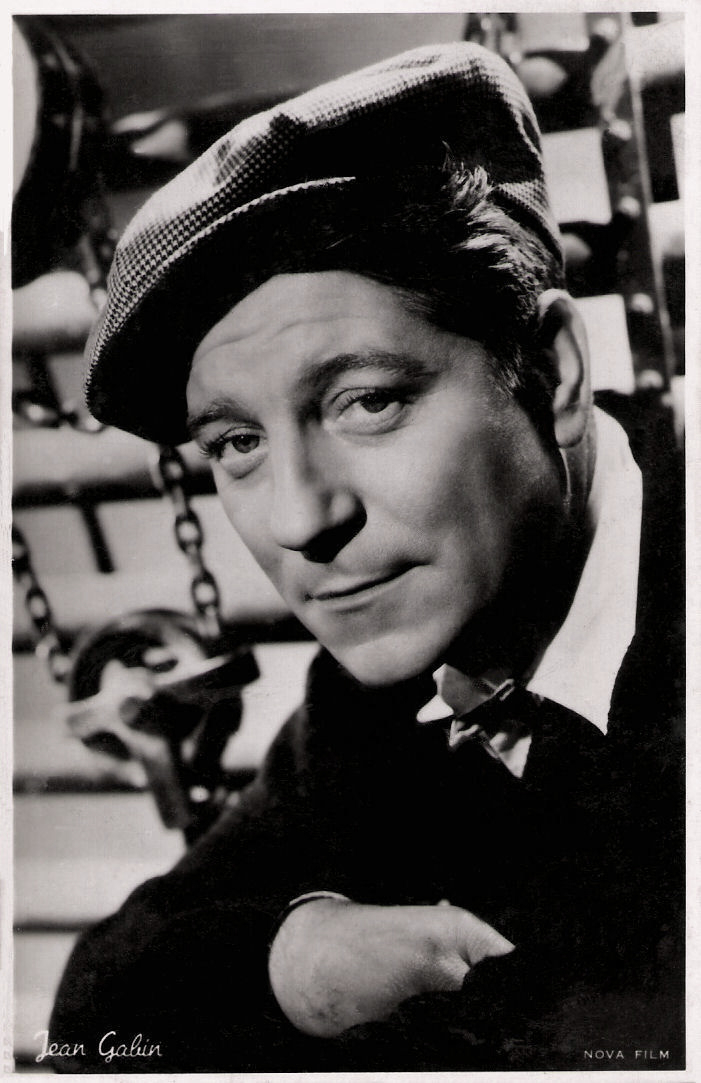
Jean Gabin in a promotional photo

- Jean Gabin as François
- Jacqueline Laurent as Françoise
- Jules Berry as Valentin
- Arletty as Clara
- Arthur Devère as Gerbois
- Bernard Blier as Gaston
- Marcel Pérès as Paulo
- Germaine Lix as singer
- Georges Douking as blind man (uncredited)

== Distribution ==
Le jour se lève was released in France in June 1939 and shown in the US the following year. In France, however, the film was banned in 1940 by the Vichy government on the grounds it was demoralizing. After the war's end, the film was shown again to wide acclaim.

In 1947, it was again suppressed when RKO Radio Pictures wanted to remake the film in Hollywood (as The Long Night). The company acquired the distribution rights of the French film and sought to buy up and destroy every copy of the film that they could obtain. For a time it was feared that they had been successful and that the film was lost, but it re-appeared in the 1950s and has subsequently stood alongside Les Enfants du paradis as one of the finest achievements of the partnership of Carné and Prévert.

== Home media ==
In 2014, a restored version of the film was released as a region-B Blu-ray disc by StudioCanal. This version reinstates dialogue and shots (including a nude Arletty) that had been deleted by Vichy censors.

== See also ==
- List of rediscovered films
