= Pop. 1280 =

1964 crime novel by Jim Thompson

- First edition
- Author: Jim Thompson
- Language: English
- Genre: Crime novel
- Publisher: Gold Medal Books
- Publication date: 1964
- Publication place: United States
- Media type: Print
- Pages: 143 pp

Pop. 1280 is a crime novel by Jim Thompson published in 1964.

Set in the fictional town of Pottsville during the early 20th century, the novel follows Nick Corey, a seemingly dim-witted sheriff whose pleasant exterior hides a scheming, psychopathic personality. He holds a deeply cynical view of his town and views his place there as enforcing the law as little as possible. Through the course of the novel Nick commits a series of increasingly egregious crimes against deserving and innocent people alike and expertly manipulates those around him to avoid accountability and realize his desires.

The book's critical reception has been largely positive. NPR's Stephen Marche described it as Thompson's "true masterpiece, a preposterously upsetting, ridiculously hilarious layer cake of nastiness, a romp through a world of nearly infinite deceit." Charlie Higson noted that "The book manages to switch between hilarious and horrific in a startling manner."

== Plot ==
Pop. 1280 is the first-person narrative of Nick Corey, the listless sheriff of Potts County, the "47th (out of 47) largest county in the state". He lives in Pottsville which has a population of "1280 souls". The story takes place in the early 20th century.

Sheriff Nick Corey presents himself as a genial fool, simplistic, over-accommodating, and harmless to a fault, given he is Pottsville's sole lawman. In reality, he is a clever psychopath who remorselessly murders several people and deceives everyone around him.

The novel begins with Nick visiting Ken Lacey, the sheriff of a nearby county, ostensibly to ask for advice about two pimps who regularly insult and bully him. Lacey mocks and belittles Nick, boasting that if any pimps disrespected him, he would shoot them dead on the spot. Later that evening Nick goes to see the two pimps, who it is revealed Nick has been taking bribes from. As they berate and mock him as usual, Nick fatally shoots them both.

Sheriff Lacey comes to see Nick, having become concerned that Nick might actually kill the pimps and make Lacey complicit in the crime. Nick reassures Lacey, then deceives him into staying at the pimps' brothel and boasting to the town that he had 'taken care of' the pimps.

The next day, county attorney Robert Lee Jefferson berates Nick for never making any arrests. Jefferson warns Nick that he will face a strong opponent in the coming election from Sam Gaddis. Nick replies that the people don't really want him to do his job, that they enjoy petty crimes such as gambling, public drunkenness, and prostitution, and that if he started to arrest people for such crimes he would have to arrest the whole town. He agrees that Gaddis is a man of moral character "regardless of all the rumors," planting the seed for those rumors to spread.

Nick then goes to find Tom Hauck, the husband of Rose Hauck with whom Nick is having an affair. He finds Hauck, who had ostensibly gone out on a hunting excursion, drunk under a tree some distance from town and kills him with Hauck's own shotgun. Nick then tells Rose he has killed her husband; she is overjoyed, and they have passionate sex.

In addition to Rose, Nick is also having an affair with Amy Mason. Whereas Rose is foul-mouthed and hypocritical, Amy is the only person in Pottsville that is beyond Nick's manipulation, which makes her more appealing to Nick than either Rose or his wife Myra. Nick comes up with a way to get rid of Myra, her brother Lennie, and Rose all at once. He manipulates Rose into telling Lennie that she has seen him having sex with Myra. Unbeknownst to Nick, Myra really is sleeping with Lennie, and confronts Rose at her house. Rose shoots both Myra and Lennie dead.

Rose finally realizes the extent of her manipulation by Nick, but when she confronts him, he laughs at her and suggests that she flee town before her murders are discovered. Nick's inner monologue becomes increasingly delusional and confused as he comes to believe he is God's agent sent to exercise divine justice upon Pottsville. The novel ends with Nick being privately confronted by Sheriff Lacey's deputy for yet another betrayal.

== Themes ==
The character of a sheriff who plays the fool but is in reality highly intelligent is used several times by Thompson. Sometimes, as in this novel and The Killer Inside Me, the sheriff is a psychopath. In the novels Wild Town and The Transgressors, the sheriff is heroic, a highly intelligent man who was forced by circumstances to take a job that did not allow him to take full advantage of his abilities and who plays at being a clown to fit in to his role and to manipulate people for altruistic ends.

In his autobiography Bad Boy, Thompson wrote that this character was based on an actual deputy who pursued him when he neglected to pay a fine for being drunk and disturbing the peace. As recounted in a New York Times article, Thompson describes the encounter he had with the deputy:

Alone with him on the vast prairie, the deputy becomes a creature of menace: "Lived here all my life . . . Everyone knows me. No one knows you. And we're all alone. What do you make o' that, a smart fella like you? . . . What do you think an ol' stupid country boy might do in a case like this?"

The deputy grins, puts on a pair of gloves, smacks a fist into the palm of his other hand.

"I'll tell you something. . . . Tell you a couple of things. There ain't no way of telling what a man is by looking at him. There ain't no way of knowing what he'll do if he has the chance. You think maybe you can remember that?"

The sheriff also is quite likely based to some degree on Thompson's own father, who had many of the same characteristics: a born politician who knew just what to say to win favor with anyone and who appeared friendly on the outside but inside harbored a great deal of pent up rage and misanthropy.

Pop. 1280 is also one of Thompson's most overtly political books. Nick constantly uses jokes to point out the racism, classism, and sexism of American society, for example at the end of Nick's discussion with the county attorney who is after Nick to make more arrests when Nick promises to arrest anyone who breaks the law, "Providing o' course, that he's either colored or some poor white trash that can't pay his poll tax".

Kenneth Payne argued that a major theme of the book is "American emptiness," where Nick's psychosis and delusions are emblematic of the American psyche. This theme appears most explicitly near the book's climax, when Nick looks into Rose's house and is struck by its emptiness, thinking "I'd maybe been in that house a hundred times, that one and a hundred others like it. But this was the first time I'd seen what they really were. Not homes, not places for people to live in, not nothin'. Just pine-board walls locking in the emptiness."

== Adaptations ==
Pop. 1280 was adapted as the French film Coup de Torchon (1981), directed by Bertrand Tavernier, set in French West Africa in 1938.

In 2019 Yorgos Lanthimos was tapped by Imperative Entertainment to write and direct a new adaptation of the novel.

== In popular culture ==
The 1997 film Cop Land, references the novel's title with the population of its setting, the fictional town of Garrison, New Jersey.
