= The Ways of Sin =

- Film poster
- Directed by: Giorgio Pastina
- Written by: Grazia Deledda (novel); Giorgio Pastina
- Starring: Jacqueline Laurent; Leonardo Cortese; Carlo Ninchi; Ada Dondini
- Cinematography: Giuseppe La Torre
- Edited by: Mario Serandrei
- Music by: Mario Labroca
- Production company: Ilaria Film
- Distributed by: ENIC
- Release date: 19 October 1946
- Running time: 90 minutes
- Country: Italy
- Language: Italian

The Ways of Sin (Italian: Le vie del peccato) is a 1946 Italian historical melodrama film directed by Giorgio Pastina and starring Jacqueline Laurent, Leonardo Cortese and Carlo Ninchi. The film is a melodrama set in Sardinia at the beginning of the twentieth century. It is based on a novel by Grazia Deledda. The film was shot in the Apennine Mountains rather than Sardinia.

== Cast ==
- Jacqueline Laurent as Ilaria
- Leonardo Cortese as Don Roberto
- Carlo Ninchi as Don Sebastiano Pinna
- Ada Dondini as Eufemia Pinna
- Laura Gore as Carla Pinna
- Gualtiero Tumiati as Don Salvatore
- Andrea Checchi as Rocco
- Lauro Gazzolo as Il farmacista
- Umberto Sacripante as Fausto, Il pastore
- Michele Riccardini as Il sacerdote
- Nino Pavese as Il brigadiere
- Franco Coop as Il notaio
- Dante Maggio as La guardia carceraria
- Rinalda Marchetti as L'amante di Don Sebastiano
- Amalia Pellegrini as La domestica dei Pinna
- Aldo Silvani as Il giudice istruttore

== Bibliography ==
- Urban, Maria Bonaria. Sardinia on Screen: The Construction of the Sardinian Character in Italian Cinema. Rodopi, 2013.
