= Alina (film) =

- DVD cover
- Directed by: Giorgio Pastina
- Written by: Carlo Duse, Faldella
- Produced by: Arrigo Atti
- Starring: Gina Lollobrigida, Amedeo Nazzari
- Cinematography: Tonino Delli Colli
- Edited by: Giancarlo Cappelli
- Music by: Franco Casavola
- Distributed by: Acta Film, Filmolimpia, La Quercia
- Release date: 6 August 1950
- Running time: 90 minutes
- Country: Italy
- Language: Italian

Alina is a 1950 Italian melodrama film directed by Giorgio Pastina. The film stars Gina Lollobrigida as Alina and Amedeo Nazzari as Giovanni.

== Cast ==
- Gina Lollobrigida as Alina
- Amedeo Nazzari as Giovanni
- Doris Dowling as Marie
- Juan de Landa as Lucien
- Otello Toso as Marco
- Lauro Gazzolo as Alina's Husband
- Camillo Pilotto as Andrea
- Gino Cavalieri as Giulio
- Vittorio André
- Oscar Andriani as A smuggler
- Frank Colson as L'Americano
- Augusto Di Giovanni as Il brigadiere
