= Gino Cavalieri =

Italian actor (1895–1992)

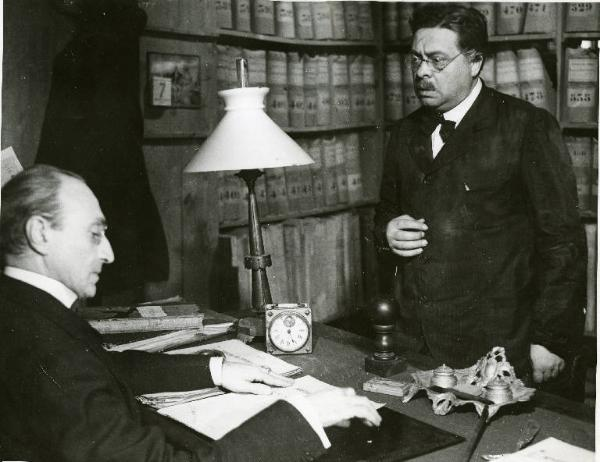
- Gino Cavalieri (Left sitting) with Aldo Fabrizi (right standing) in 1947 Italian drama film Il delitto di Giovanni Episcopo
- Born: 25 July 1895; Vicenza, Italy
- Died: 15 October 1992 (aged 97); Treviso, Italy
- Occupation: Actor
- Years active: 1937–1983

Gino Cavalieri (25 July 1895 – 15 October 1992) was an Italian film actor. He appeared in more than 20 films between 1937 and 1983.

== Filmography ==
Year	Title	Role	Notes
1936	Il grande silenzio		
1937	Nina non far la stupida	Buganza	
1942	Fourth Page	Suo compagno	
1943	Canal grande	Occhiobello	
1946	Paese senza pace	Cristofolo	
1946	Professor, My Son		
1946	La vita semplice	Marco Bressan	
1947	To Live in Peace	Il Parroco	
1947	Flesh Will Surrender	Il direttore dell'archivio	
1947	Angelina		
1948	Les Misérables	L'archivista della polizia	
1950	Alina	Giulio	
1950	The White Line	The Priest	
1951	Arrivano i nostri		
1951	Toto the Third Man		
1951	The Captain of Venice		
1953	I Chose Love		
1955	Summertime		Uncredited
1963	Chi lavora è perduto (In capo al mondo)		
1970	The Priest's Wife	Don Filippo	
1971	Secret Fantasy	Costanza's Father	
1977	The Forbidden Room	Versatti	
1981	Portrait of a Woman, Nude	Il Professore	Uncredited
1983	The Key	Don Rusetto	(final film role)
