= The Man Who Played with Fire =

1942 film

- Directed by: Jean de Limur
- Written by: Pierre Bost; Pierre Guerlais
- Produced by: René Montis
- Starring: Ginette Leclerc; Jacqueline Laurent; Aimé Clariond
- Cinematography: Jean Isnard
- Edited by: Raymond Lamy
- Music by: Maurice Thiriet
- Production company: Industrie Cinématographique
- Distributed by: Industrie Cinématographique
- Release date: 5 August 1942
- Running time: 105 minutes
- Country: France
- Language: French

The Man Who Played with Fire (French: L'homme qui joue avec le feu) is a 1942 French romantic drama film directed by Jean de Limur and starring Ginette Leclerc, Jacqueline Laurent and Aimé Clariond. The film's sets were designed by the art director Robert-Jules Garnier.

== Synopsis ==
A well-meaning wealthy man Monsieur Desert decides to try and cure men and women of heartaches in love. He establishes a retreat for them in the grounds of a country estate and with the assistance of his grandson Bernard attempts to watch over them to cure them of love. However, things do not go according to plan.

== Cast ==
- Ginette Leclerc as Clara
- Jacqueline Laurent as Mireille
- Aimé Clariond as Monsieur Desert
- Georges Marchal as Bernard
- Jean Davy as Jacques
- Marthe Mellot as Madame des Perthuis
- Germaine Kerjean as Madame Suzanne
- Régine Poncet as La femme
- Georges Vitray as Lebergier
- Georges Jamin as L'homme douteux
- Sophie Desmarets as Gabrielle
- Lucien Leblanc as Léon
- Liliane Lesaffre as La malade
- André Lorière as Monsieur Blanche
- Albert Malbert as Le clochard
- Frédéric Mariotti as Le garçon de café

== Bibliography ==
- Leahy, Sarah & Vanderschelden, Isabelle. Screenwriters in French cinema. Manchester University Press, 2021.
- Rège, Philippe. Encyclopedia of French Film Directors, Volume 1. Scarecrow Press, 2009.
- Siclier, Jacques. La France de Pétain et son cinéma. H. Veyrier, 1981.
