= Twilight (1944 film) =

1944 film

- Directed by: Marc Allégret
- Written by: Marc Allégret; Marcel Achard (dialogue); Curt Alexander; Charles de Peyret-Chappuis
- Based on: "Histoire Comique" by Anatole France
- Starring: Claude Dauphin; Micheline Presle; Louis Jourdan
- Cinematography: Louis Page
- Music by: Jacques Ibert
- Production company: Les Films Impéria
- Distributed by: Les Films Impéria
- Release date: 20 December 1944
- Running time: 99 minutes
- Country: France
- Language: French
- Box office: 1,874,826 admissions (France)

Twilight (French: Félicie Nanteuil) is a 1944 French drama film directed by Marc Allégret and starring Claude Dauphin, Micheline Presle and Louis Jourdan.

== Plot ==
Two men are in love with the same woman.

== Production ==
The film was shot at the Victorine Studios in Nice during 1942.

== Reception ==
The movie was popular at the French box office.

== Cast ==
- Claude Dauphin as Aimé Cavalier
- Micheline Presle as Félicie Nanteuil
- Louis Jourdan as Robert de Ligny
- Jacques Louvigny as Pradel
- Marcelle Praince as Mme Nanteuil
- Marion Malville as Fagette
- Charlotte Clasis as Mme Pierson
- Mady Berry as Mme Michon
- Max Révol
- Henry Lefevre
- Jean d'Yd as Le docteur Socrate
- Gaston Orbal as Constantin
- Edmond Beauchamp as Le jeune premier
- Danièle Delorme as La camarade de Félicie
- Roger Pigaut as Petit rôle
- Pierre Prévert as L'appariteur
- Simone Sylvestre as Mme de Ligny
