= Goodbye Leonard =

1943 film

- Directed by: Pierre Prévert
- Written by: Jacques Prévert; Pierre Prévert
- Produced by: André Halley des Fontaines
- Starring: Charles Trenet; Pierre Brasseur; Julien Carette
- Cinematography: André Thomas
- Edited by: Charles Bretoneiche
- Music by: Joseph Kosma
- Production company: Essor Cinématographique Français
- Distributed by: Pathé Consortium Cinéma
- Release date: 1 September 1943
- Running time: 104 minutes
- Country: France
- Language: French

Goodbye Leonard (French: Adieu Léonard) is a 1943 French comedy film directed by Pierre Prévert and starring Charles Trenet, Pierre Brasseur and Julien Carette. The future star Simone Signoret had a small role in the film.

The film's sets were designed by the art director Max Douy. It was shot at the Francoeur Studios in Paris. It was distributed by Pathé, one of France's largest film companies.

== Partial cast ==
- Charles Trenet as Ludovic Malvoisin - un doux poète
- Pierre Brasseur as Prosper Bonenfant - un affairiste véreux
- Julien Carette as Félicien Léonard - un fabricant de farces et attrapes ruiné
- Denise Grey as Bernardine Léonard - la femme insupportable et dépensière de Félicien
- Jean Meyer as Eugène Tancrède - un poète
- Jacqueline Bouvier as Paulette - une serveuse qui aime Ludovic
- Gaby Wagner as Marguerite, la jolie voyageuse
- Marcel Pérès as Le patron du café 'La Confiance'
- Albert Rémy as Le marchand d'oiseaux
- Jeanne Arnoux
- Roger Blin as Le chef bohémien
- René Bourbon as Maître Failtrain - le notaire
- Jenny Burnay as Geneviève Bonenfant - la femme de Prosper
- Jean Dasté as Le raccommodeur de porcelaine
- Guy Decomble as Le rémouleur
- Etienne Decroux as Prasmoquier
- Jean Didier as Le voyageur dans le train
- Louise Fouquet as La bouquetière
- Yette Lucas as La patronne du café 'La Confiance'
- Madeleine Suffel as La poule
- Edmond Van Daële as Le graveur
- Yves Deniaud as Léon - le garçon de café
- Maurice Baquet as Le marchand de lampions
- Édouard Delmont as Le chemineau
- Simone Signoret as La gitane
- Geneviève Morel as La bonne

== Bibliography ==
- Hayward, Susan. Simone Signoret: The Star as Cultural Sign. A&C Black, 2004.
