= Mystery Trip =

1947 film

- Directed by: Pierre Prévert
- Written by: Jacques Prévert; Pierre Prévert; Claude Accursi
- Based on: Voyage Surprise by André Gillois
- Produced by: Louis Daquin; Pierre Lévy-Corti; Adrien Remaugé; Roland Tual
- Starring: Martine Carol; Maurice Baquet; Jean Sinoël
- Cinematography: Jean Bourgoin
- Edited by: Jacques Desagneaux; Raymonde le Jeune
- Music by: Joseph Kosma
- Production companies: Coopérative Générale du Cinéma Français; Productions Synops
- Distributed by: Pathé Consortium Cinéma
- Release date: 21 May 1947
- Running time: 85 minutes
- Country: France
- Language: French

Mystery Trip (French: Voyage surprise) is a 1947 French comedy film directed by Pierre Prévert and starring Martine Carol, Maurice Baquet and Jean Sinoël. It was shot at the Cité Elgé Studios in Paris. The film's sets were designed by the art director Alexandre Trauner and Auguste Capelier.

== Synopsis ==
A struggling coach service run by the elderly Piuff is struggling from competition. To help revive the business his grandchildren assist him to organise a mystery trip. His adversaries try to sabotage it but in a surreal series of events the disasters of the journey are taken by the passengers as all part of the enjoyment.

== Cast ==
- Martine Carol as Isabelle Grosbois
- Maurice Baquet as Teddy
- Jean Sinoël as Le grand-père Piuff
- Annette Poivre as Marinette
- Marcel Pérès as Le faux turc / L'aubergiste
- Thérèse Aspar as Marianne - la première jeune fille
- René Bourbon as Monsieur Grosbois
- Dominique Brévant as Janine - la seconde jeune fille
- Roger Caccia as Monsieur Barbizon
- Lucien Carol as Le patron du "Paon"
- Niko Dakis as Boris
- Etienne Decroux as Mikhaïl
- Thérèse Dorny as Mademoiselle Roberta
- Jeanne Dussol as Madame Duroc
- Jacques-Henry Duval as Grim
- Fernand René as Monsieur le curé
- Claire Gérard as Madame Marguerite
- Max Révol as Abel Renardot - un détective privé
- Charles Lavialle as L'inspecteur Vaudor
- Christian Simon as Pierrot Duroc
- Robert Lombard as Richard - le jeune marié
- Gaston Orbal as Le commandant Wagon
- Georges Vitsoris as Le baron Gregor
- Cécilia Paroldi as Florence - la jeune mariée
- Piéral as La grande-duchesse de Strombolie
- Lucien Raimbourg as Monsieur Duroc

== Bibliography ==
- Goble, Alan. The Complete Index to Literary Sources in Film. Walter de Gruyter, 1999.
- Rège, Philippe. Encyclopedia of French Film Directors, Volume 1. Scarecrow Press, 2009.
