= Foun-Sen =

French actress (1915–89)

- Born: Cécile Nguyen Ngoc Tue; 28 February 1915; Tonkin, French Indochina
- Died: 5 February 1989 (aged 73); Neuilly-sur-Seine, France
- Occupation: Actress
- Years active: 1936–1979 (film & TV)

Foun-Sen (28 February 1915 – 5 February 1989) was a French-Vietnamese film actress. She was married to the film director Léo Joannon.

== Selected filmography ==
- Port Arthur (1936)
- Samson (1936)
- Wolves Between Them 1936)
- Forty Little Mothers (1936)
- The Alibi (1937)
- Yoshiwara (1937)
- Woman of Malacca (1937)
- Mollenard (1938)
- The City of Lights (1938)
- The Shanghai Drama (1938)
- Monsieur Breloque Has Disappeared (1938)
- The Emigrant (1940)
- The Ménard Collection (1944)
- Fort du Fou (1963)
- Five Ashore in Singapore (1967)

== Bibliography ==
- Keith, Charles. Subjects and Sojourners: A History of Indochinese in France. University of California Press, 2024.
- Kennedy-Karpat, Colleen. Rogues, Romance, and Exoticism in French Cinema of the 1930s. Fairleigh Dickinson, 2013.
