= Giorgio Pastina =

Italian screenwriter and film director

- Born: 1905; Andria, Apulia, Italy
- Died: 1956 (aged 50–51); Rome, Lazio, Italy
- Occupations: Director and screenwriter
- Years active: 1942–1954 (film)

Giorgio Pastina (1905–1956) was an Italian screenwriter and film director. He directed Henry IV, a 1943 film version of Luigi Pirandello's Henry IV.

== Selected filmography ==
=== Director ===
- Henry IV (1943)
- The Ways of Sin (1946)
- Vanity (1947)
- William Tell (1949)
- Sicilian Uprising (1949)
- Alina (1950)
- Giovinezza (1952)
- Matrimonial Agency (1953)
- Cardinal Lambertini (1954)
- Of Life and Love (1954)
- Letter from Naples (1954)

=== Screenwriter ===
- Fedora (1942)
- A Living Statue (1943)
- Farewell Love! (1943)
- I'll Always Love You (1943)
