= Two Timid Souls (1943 film) =

1943 film

- Directed by: Yves Allégret; Marcel Achard; Marc Allégret
- Written by: Eugène Labiche (play); Claude-André Puget
- Starring: Pierre Brasseur; Jacqueline Laurent; Claude Dauphin
- Cinematography: Philippe Agostini
- Edited by: Roger Spiri-Mercaton]
- Music by: Jean Marion; Germaine Tailleferre
- Production company: Les Films Impéria
- Distributed by: Gray-Film
- Release date: 3 March 1943
- Running time: 83 minutes
- Country: France
- Language: French

Two Timid Souls (French: Les deux timides) is a 1943 French historical comedy film directed by Yves Allégret, Marcel Achard and Marc Allégret and starring Pierre Brasseur, Jacqueline Laurent and Claude Dauphin. It was based on the 1860 play by Eugène Labiche which had previously been turned into a 1928 silent film version by René Clair. The film's sets were designed by the art director Paul Bertrand.

== Cast ==
- Pierre Brasseur as Vancouver
- Jacqueline Laurent as Cécile Thibaudier
- Claude Dauphin as Jules Frémissin
- Gisèle Préville as Cécile Vancouver
- Lucien Callamand as Claquepont
- Marie Caplie as Lisbeth van Putzeboom
- Fernand Charpin as Monsieur van Putzeboom
- Yves Deniaud as Le commis voyageur
- Marc Doelnitz as Le militaire
- Monique Garbo as Une des jeunes filles
- Henri Guisol as Anatole Garadou
- Germaine Lespagnol as Une des jeunes filles
- Jane Marken as Tante Valérie
- Gaston Orbal as Dardenboeuf
- Giselle Pascal as Une des jeunes filles
- Pierre Prévert as Verdinet
- Renée Reney as Une des jeunes filles
- Denyse Roux as Annette
- Tramel as Thibaudier

== Bibliography ==
- Dayna Oscherwitz & MaryEllen Higgins. The A to Z of French Cinema. Scarecrow Press, 2009.
