= Tout chante autour de moi =

1954 film

- Theatrical release poster
- Directed by: Pierre Gout
- Starring: Mouloudji
- Release date: 1954
- Country: France
- Language: French

Tout chante autour de moi is a 1954 black and white French musical comedy film directed by Pierre Gout which was the debut film vehicle for the pop star Mouloudji.

== Cast ==
- Marcel Mouloudji : Georges
- Alain Bouvette
- Christine Carère : Anne-Marie
- Florence Fouquet : Marthe Nollier
- Pierre Mondy : Paul Nollier
- Michel Piccoli : Reverdier
- Lucien Raimbourg

== Soundtrack ==
The soundtrack includes "Je ne sais pas pourquoi", by Mouloudji and also recorded by Mathé Altéry and other French singers. The track appears on Mouloudji: les plus belles javas and Mouloudji: 58 grandes chansons.
