= Hotel Paradiso =

- Theatrical release poster by Frank Frazetta
- Directed by: Peter Glenville
- Written by: Jean-Claude Carrière; Peter Glenville
- Based on: L'Hôtel du libre échange 1894 play by Georges Feydeau; Maurice Desvallières
- Produced by: Peter Glenville, Pierre Jourdan
- Starring: Alec Guinness; Gina Lollobrigida; Robert Morley
- Cinematography: Henri Decaë
- Edited by: Anne V. Coates
- Music by: Laurence Rosenthal
- Distributed by: Metro-Goldwyn-Mayer
- Release date: 14 October 1966 (New York City)
- Running time: 98 minutes
- Country: United Kingdom
- Language: English

Hotel Paradiso is a 1966 British comedy film directed by Peter Glenville and starring Alec Guinness, Gina Lollobrigida and Robert Morley. It was written by Jean-Claude Carrière and Glenville based on the 1894 play L'Hôtel du libre échange by Maurice Desvallières and Georges Feydeau. It was released by Metro-Goldwyn-Mayer in Panavision.

Alec Guinness reprised the role he had played in the London West End theatre production of Hotel Paradiso, which opened at the Winter Garden Theatre, Drury Lane, London on 2 May 1956. Douglas Byng also reprised his part from the stage play.

== Plot ==
Playwright Monsieur Feydeau is staying in the Parisian Hotel Paradiso. He needs to write a new play, but has writer's block. He takes the opportunity to observe his fellow guests: Monsieur Boniface, henpecked by his domineering wife, and Marcelle, the beautiful but neglected wife of Henri, a building inspector. Henri is sent to the hotel to investigate rumours of ghosts (which turn out to be caused by drains). However, the hotel is the trysting place of Marcelle and Boniface, who are having an affair. Family friend Martin shows up with his little daughters, but there isn't enough room at Boniface's place for the entire family. Martin overhears the name of the hotel, and checks in with them there.

In the somewhat rundown 'by-the-hour' hotel, there are two husbands and one wife, plus Henri's nephew and Boniface's maid, who are also having an affair. The little girls, responding to a "spooky" atmosphere in their room, sing a chant about witches while waving bedsheets, frightening Henri and other guests into thinking the ghost rumor is true. Marcelle and Boniface's affair is severely compromised (not least by a police raid). All these events provide Feydeau with the material for his play, which becomes the succès fou of the next season.

== Cast ==
- Alec Guinness as Benedict Boniface
- Gina Lollobrigida as Marcelle Cotte
- Robert Morley as Henri Cotte
- David Battley as George
- Ann Beach as Victoire
- Marie Bell as la Grande Antoinette
- Douglas Byng as Mr. Martin
- Derek Fowlds as Maxime
- Eddra Gale as Guest
- Peter Glenville as the playwright
- Robertson Hare as the Duke
- Darío Moreno as the Turk
- Peggy Mount as Angelique Boniface
- Leonard Rossiter as the Inspector
- Akim Tamiroff as Anniello

== Critical reception ==
David McGillivray wrote in The Monthly Film Bulletin: "The decor is eye-catching, Decaé's photography crystal-clear, and Alec Guinness plays with nostalgic charm the sort of knockabout he grew out of in the Fifties. ... The farce has been diluted into light comedy and, apart from one sequence in which the entire clientele of the charge up and down the corridors like steam trains, the emphasis is set squarely on repetitive prowling and hiding. Some idea of the pace can be gained from the fact that forty minutes pass before the first pair of doors opens simultaneously."

Writing for The New York Times, Thomas Lask said "essentially, 'Hotel Paradiso' is a bedroom farce in the old tradition, and the picture is based on a frothy example of the genre by a master, Georges Feydeau, who worked with Maurice Desvallieres on the play. That kind of exercise calls for a crispness, a propulsive energy that Mr. Glenville's film has only fitfully. The result is that the picture is charming when it should be brisk, amiable when it should be ridiculous." However, he praised the cast, particularly Guinness.

Editor Annr Cotes called it a "disaster film-wise".
