= Baleydier =

1932 film

- Directed by: Jean Mamy
- Written by: André Girard; Jacques Prévert
- Produced by: Pierre Braunberger; Roger Richebé
- Starring: Michel Simon; Josseline Gaël; Jean Gehret
- Cinematography: Roger Hubert; Theodor Sparkuhl
- Production company: Les Établissements Braunberger-Richebé
- Distributed by: Les Établissements Braunberger-Richebé
- Release date: 15 January 1932
- Running time: 74 minutes
- Country: France
- Language: French

Baleydier is a 1932 French comedy film directed by Jean Mamy and starring Michel Simon, Josseline Gaël and Jean Gehret. The film's sets were designed by the art director Gabriel Scognamillo.

== Synopsis ==
Baleydier, a hairdresser, wins a competition which allows him to star in a major historical film then under production. During filming everyone makes fun of him because of his simple ways and expects the film to be a disaster. Instead, on its release, it becomes a huge hit as people mistake it for a comedy.

== Cast ==
- Michel Simon as Baleydier
- Josseline Gaël as Lola
- Pierre Pradier as Petrequin
- Géo Lecomte as L'huissier
- Jean Gehret as Bloch
- Maria Fromet as L'amie
- Robert Gaillard a s Le coiffeur
- Blanche Peyrens as La caissière

== Bibliography ==
- Bessy, Maurice & Chirat, Raymond. Histoire du cinéma français: 1929-1934. Pygmalion, 1988.
- Crisp, Colin. Genre, Myth and Convention in the French Cinema, 1929-1939. Indiana University Press, 2002.
- Rège, Philippe. Encyclopedia of French Film Directors, Volume 1. Scarecrow Press, 2009.
