= Mollenard =

1938 film

- Directed by: Robert Siodmak
- Written by: Charles Spaak
- Based on: Mollenard by Oscar-Paul Gilbert
- Produced by: Edouard Corniglion-Molinier
- Starring: Harry Baur; Pierre Renoir; Gabrielle Dorziat; Albert Préjean
- Cinematography: Eugen Schüfftan
- Edited by: Léonide Azar
- Music by: Jacques Dallin; Darius Milhaud
- Production company: Productions Corniglion-Molinier
- Distributed by: Pathé Consortium Cinéma
- Release date: 26 January 1938
- Running time: 106 minutes
- Country: France
- Language: French

Mollenard is a 1938 French drama film directed by Robert Siodmak and starring Harry Baur, Gabrielle Dorziat and Pierre Renoir. It was also known by the alternative titles of Hatred and Capitaine Corsaire. The film's sets were designed by Alexandre Trauner. It is based on the novel of the same name by the Belgian writer Oscar-Paul Gilbert. The film's plot divides sharply into halves, with the first an action thriller set in China while the second is a social drama with the title character struggling to cope with what he regards as the suffocating atmosphere of his home port in France.

The film was shot at the Joinville Studios in Paris and on location. An English-language version starring Victor McLaglen and Ruth Chatterton was planned but never made.

== Plot ==
Captain Mollenard is an uncouth, almost piratical, commander of a merchant ship sailing out of Dunkirk. When the ship's owners discover that Mollenard has been selling arms on his own account, they decided to suspend him for six months. This horrifies his wife and children who have become used to his long absences. Mollenard hears news of his suspension while in Shanghai where he and his deputy Kerrotret are trying to offload their latest cargo of arms. They become entangled with a ruthless and treacherous criminal Bonnerot and his chief henchman Frazer. Although they succeed in wounding Bonnerot, he takes his revenge by having his men plant a timed explosive device on board Mollenard's ship.

When the device starts a fire Mollenard and his men abandon ship, and returning to France find that they are now being hailed as heroes. The company, for insurance purposes, has to play along with Mollenard's new status and have to consider giving him a new ship. Mollenard causes great offence to the respectable members of the town following his return, and his wife's hatred for him grows stronger. Mollenard suddenly suffers from a collapse in his health, and comes increasingly under the domination of his detested wife – to the point that he considers shooting himself. When Kerrotret is giving command of a new ship in place of Mollenard, he and the crew rescue him from the Mollenard household and take him to sea so that he can die where he belongs.

== Reception ==
In France the film received a generally strong reception from critics. It was particularly popular with left-wing supporters of the Popular Front who celebrated its attack on respectable middle-class French society. When the film was released in the United States in 1941, critical reviews were much harsher. Variety described it as "a drab and tiresome character study of a man and wife who hate each other".

The film was not a commercial success. Siodmak followed it up with the noirish Personal Column, which did well at the box office.

== Cast ==
- Harry Baur as Captain Mollenard
- Pierre Renoir as Bonnerot
- Albert Préjean as Kerrotret
- Gabrielle Dorziat as Mme. Mollenard
- Gina Manès as Marina
- Marta Labarr as Betty Hamilton
- Ludmilla Pitoëff as Marie Mollenard
- Foun-Sen as La chinoise
- Liliane Lesaffre as L'entraîneuse
- Marcel Dalio as Happy Jones
- Jacques Louvigny as Truffier
- Robert Lynen as Jean Mollenard
- Arthur Devère as Joseph
- Maurice Baquet as Le Joueur D'Harmonica
- Jean Clarens as Le Lieutenant
- Robert Seller as Le préfet
- Tran-Van as You
- Georges Vitray as Firmin
- Walter Rilla as Frazer
- Jacques Baumer as Le secrétaire général
- Lucien Coëdel as Le bosco
- Roger Legris as Le radio
- Armand Lurville as Dubailly d'Elbeuf
- Georges Mauloy as L'abbé Mangin
- Marcel Melrac as Homme d'équipage
- Pierre Sergeol as Fourcade
- Marcel Pérès as Homme d'équipage
- Pierre Labry
- Ky Duyen
- Rodolphe Marcilly
- Habib Benglia

== Bibliography ==
- Alpi, Deborah Lazaroff. Robert Siodmak: A Biography. McFarland, 1998.
- Bock, Hans-Michael & Bergfelder, Tim. The Concise CineGraph. Encyclopedia of German Cinema. Berghahn Books, 2009.
