= Maurice Desvallières =

French playwright (1857–1926)

Maurice Lefebvre-Desvallières
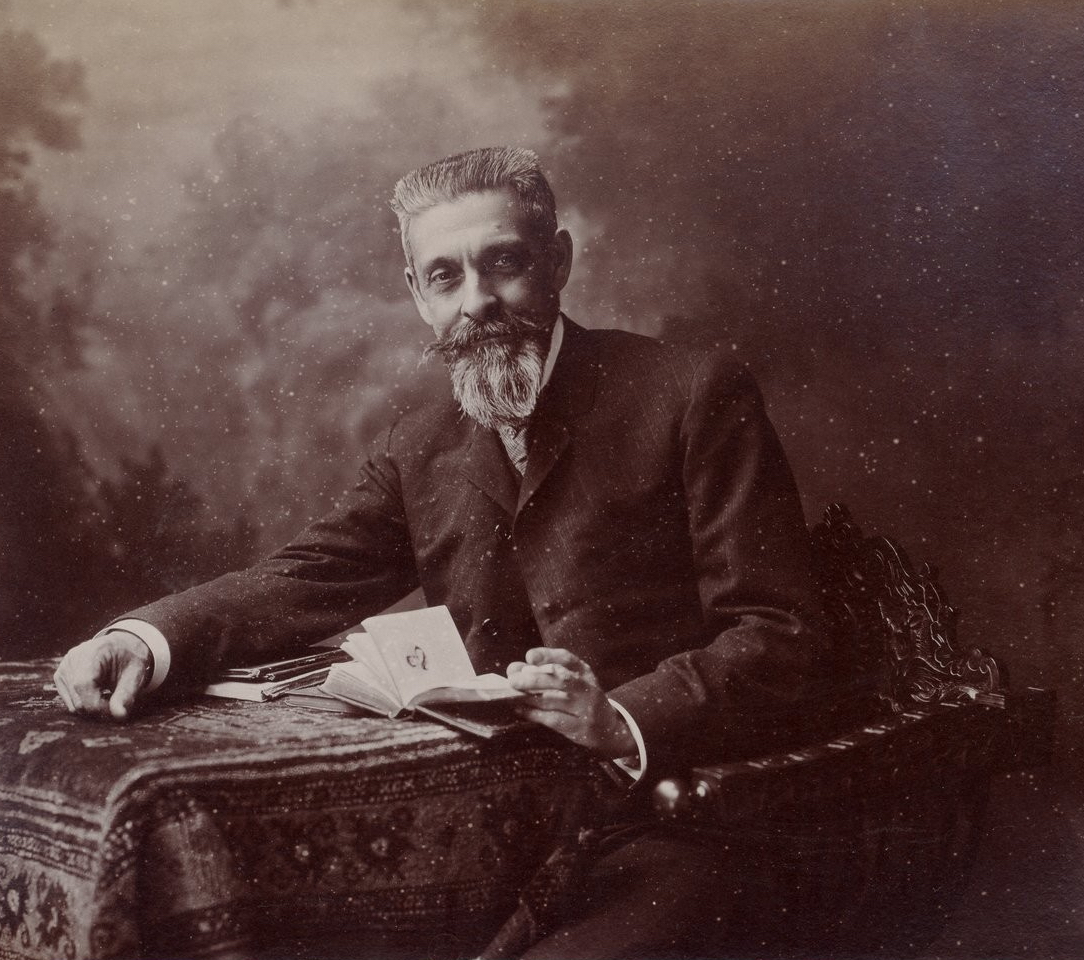
- Born: 3 October 1857; Paris, France
- Died: 23 March 1926 (aged 68); Paris, France
- Occupation: Playwright

Ernest George Maurice Lefebvre-Desvallières (3 October 1857 – 23 March 1926) was a 19th–20th-century French playwright.

Maurice was the brother of George Desvallières, son of Emile Lefebvre Desvallières and Marie Legouvé (daughter and granddaughter of academicians Ernest Legouvé and Gabriel-Marie Legouvé).

He studied at lycée Condorcet.

He wrote several theatre plays in collaboration with Georges Feydeau.

== Works ==
- 1879: Le premier bal
- 1879: Amis d'enfance
- 1881: On demande un ministre !
- 1884: Prête-moi ta femme !
- 1888: Les Fiancés de Loches (with Georges Feydeau)
- 1889: L'Affaire Édouard
- 1890: C'est une femme du monde ! (with Feydeau)
- 1890: Le Mariage de Barillon, three-act comédie en vaudeville (with Feydeau)
- 1892: Champignol malgré lui (with Feydeau)
- 1894: Le Ruban (with Feydeau)
- 1894: L'Hôtel du libre échange (with Feydeau)
- 1901: Le truc de Séraphin
- 1906: Le Fils à papa (adapted into Die keusche Susanne, 1910, and The Girl in the Taxi, 1912)
- 1920: Seine-Port et ses vieilles maisons

== Filmography ==
- Le Fils à papa, directed by Georges Monca and Charles Prince (France, 1913, short film, based on Le Fils à papa)
- Champignol malgré lui (France, 1913, based on Champignol malgré lui)
- L'Hôtel du libre échange, directed by Marcel Simon (France, 1916, based on L'Hôtel du libre échange)
- The Girl in the Taxi, directed by Lloyd Ingraham (1921, based on Le Fils à papa)
- Chaste Susanne, directed by Richard Eichberg (Germany, 1926, based on Le Fils à papa)
- Champignol malgré lui, directed by Fred Ellis (France, 1933, based on the play of the same name)
- L'Hôtel du libre échange, directed by Marc Allégret (France, 1934, based on L'Hôtel du libre échange)
- Prête-moi ta femme, directed by Maurice Cammage (France, 1936, based on Prête-moi ta femme)
- La Chaste Suzanne, directed by André Berthomieu (France, 1937, based on Le Fils à papa)
  - The Girl in the Taxi, directed by André Berthomieu (UK, 1937, based on Le Fils à papa)
- La Casta Susana, directed by Benito Perojo (Argentina, 1944, based on Le Fils à papa)
- La Casta Susana, directed by Luis César Amadori (Spain, 1963, based on Le Fils à papa)
- Äktenskapsbrottaren, directed by Hasse Ekman (Sweden, 1964, based on L'Hôtel du libre échange)
- Hotel Paradiso, directed by Peter Glenville (UK, 1966, based on L'Hôtel du libre échange)

== References and sources ==
=== Sources ===
- Pronko, Leonard Cabell (1975). Georges Feydeau. New York: Ungar. ISBN 978-0-8044-2700-5.
