= Léo Joannon =

French film director (1904–1969)

- Born: 21 August 1904; France
- Died: 28 March 1969 (aged 64); Neuilly-sur-Seine, France
- Occupation: Film director
- Years active: 1930–1967

Léo Joannon (21 August 1904 – 28 March 1969) was a French writer and film director. Born in Aix-en-Provence, Joannon was originally a law student who became a novelist and journalist before entering the film industry in the 1920s as a cameraman. He was married to the Vietnamese actress Foun-Sen.

== Career ==
Joannon first attracted international attention in early 1939 during the production of Alert in the Mediterranean when his attempts to include shots of a German naval ship docked in the port of Tangier created a diplomatic incident between the pre-World War II French and German governments. The film later won the Grand Prix du Cinema Français.

Joannon is best known to international audiences as the director of the comedy film Atoll K (1951), which was the final motion picture starring the legendary comedic double act Laurel and Hardy. Among his other better-known films were Le Defroqué (1954) and Fort du Fou (Outpost in Indochina) (1962).

Joannon died in Neuilly-sur-Seine.

== Selected filmography ==
- Five Anxious Days (1928)
- The Woman and the Puppet (1929)
- Durand Versus Durand (1931)
- The Voice of Happiness (1931)
- Suzanne (1932)
- 600,000 Francs a Month (1933)
- Excursion Train (1936)
- When Midnight Strikes (1936)
- Alert in the Mediterranean (1938)
- The Emigrant (1940)
- The White Truck (1943)
- Lucrèce (1943)
- The Ménard Collection (1944)
- Secret Documents (1945)
- Atoll K (1951)
- Le Defroque (1954)
- L'Homme aux clés d'or (1956)
- Fort du Fou (1962)

== See also ==
- Amour de poche (1957)
