= Jacques Prévert =

French poet and screenwriter (1900–1977)

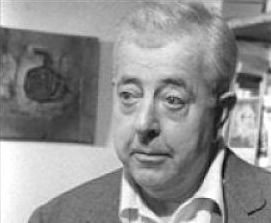
- Prévert in 1961
- Born: 4 February 1900; Neuilly-sur-Seine, France
- Died: 11 April 1977 (aged 77); Omonville-la-Petite, France
- Occupations: Poet, screenwriter
- Writing career
- Genre: Poetry
- Movement: Poetic realism

Jacques Prévert (French: [ʒak pʁevɛʁ]; 4 February 1900 – 11 April 1977) was a French poet and screenwriter. His poems became and remain popular in the French-speaking world, particularly in schools. His best-regarded films formed part of the poetic realist movement, and include Les Enfants du Paradis (1945). He published his first book in 1946.

== Life and education ==
Prévert was born in Neuilly-sur-Seine and grew up in Paris. After receiving his Certificat d'études upon completing his primary education, he quit school and went to work in Le Bon Marché, a major department store in Paris. In 1918, he was called up for military service in the First World War. After this, he was sent to the Near East to defend French interests there.

== Death ==
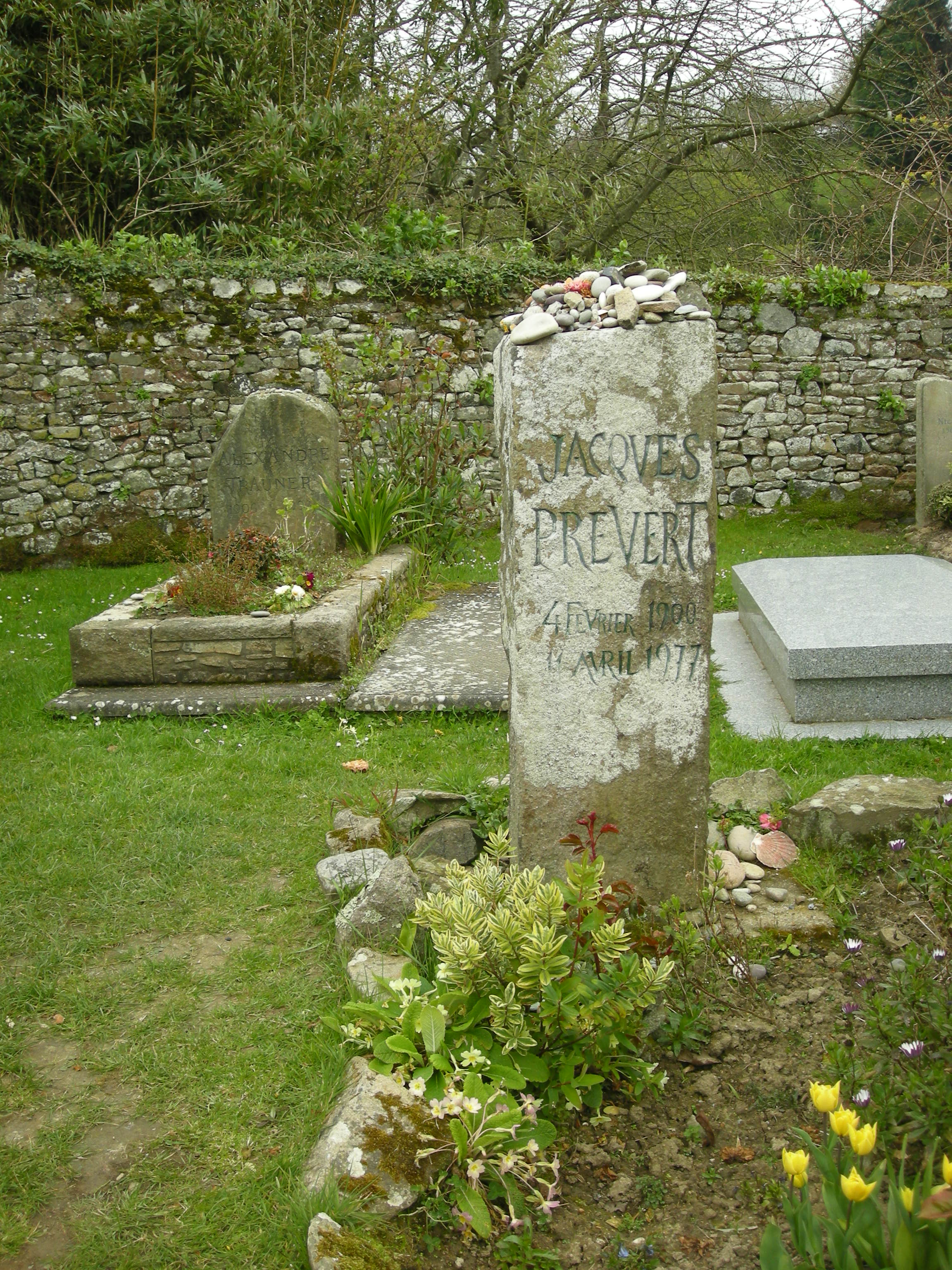
Prévert's grave, next to that of Alexandre Trauner

He died of lung cancer in Omonville-la-Petite, on 11 April 1977. He had been working on the last scene of the animated movie Le Roi et l'Oiseau (The King and the Mockingbird) with his friend and collaborator Paul Grimault. When the film was released in 1980, it was dedicated to Prévert's memory, and on opening night, Grimault kept the seat next to him empty. His dog Auto was given to a family friend after his death.

== Poetry ==
When Prévert was attending primary school, he at first hated writing. Later, he participated actively in the Surrealist movement. Together with the writers Raymond Queneau and Marcel Duhamel, he was a member of the Rue du Château group. He was also a member of the agitprop theater company Groupe Octobre where he helped craft a left-wing cinema in support of the causes of the Popular Front. Prévert remained supportive of left-wing causes throughout his life. In 1971, he wrote a poem in support of the communist Angela Davis after her arrest.

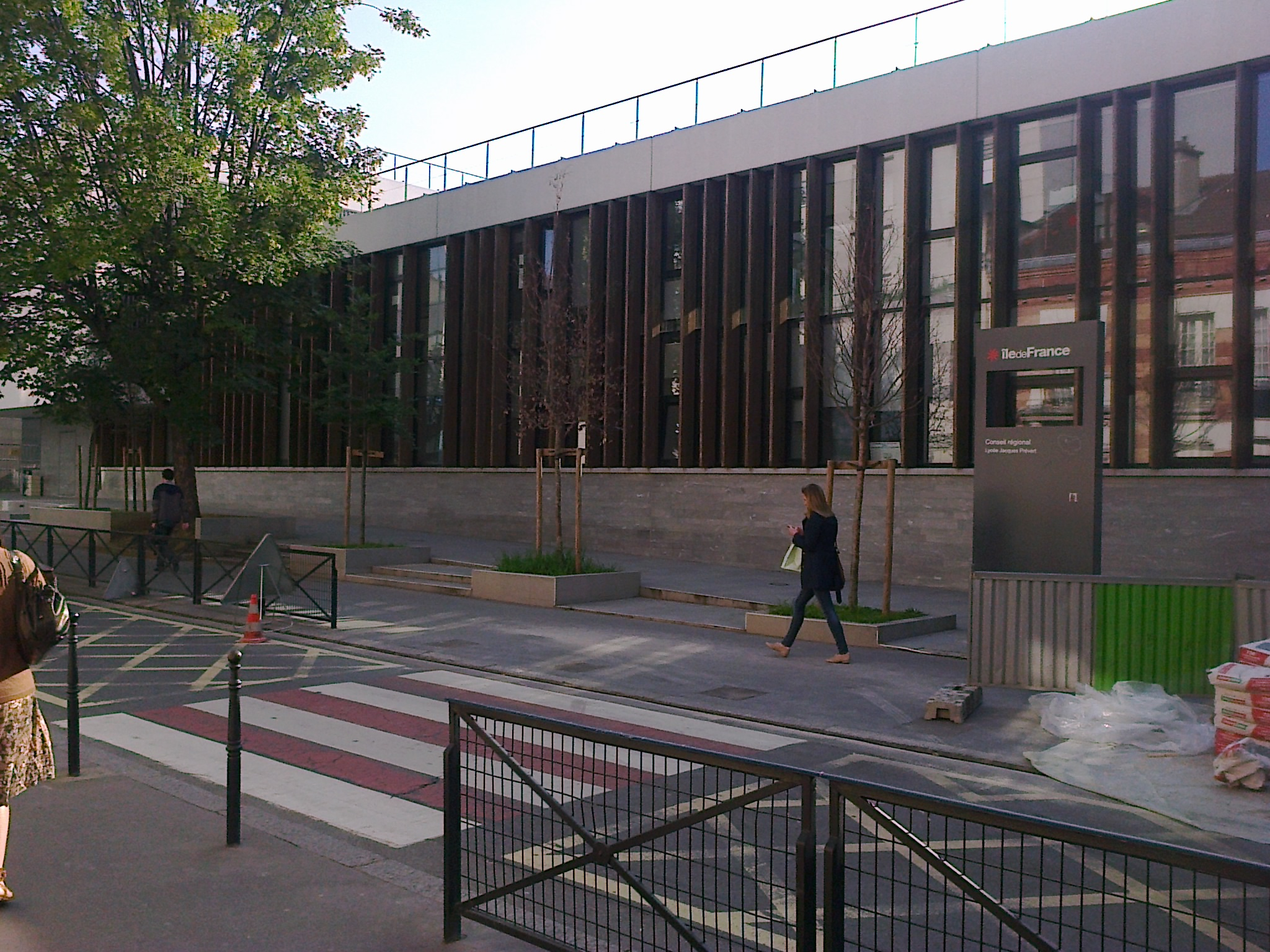
A large number of educational institutions bear the name of Jacques Prévert (Here, the lycée Jacques-Prévert in Boulogne-Billancourt)

Prévert's poems were collected and published in his books: Paroles (Words) (1946), Spectacle (1951), La Pluie et le beau temps (Rain and Good Weather) (1955), Histoires (Stories) (1963), Fatras (1971) and Choses et autres (Things and Others) (1973). His poems are often about life in Paris and life after the Second World War. They are widely taught in schools in France, and frequently appear in French language textbooks published worldwide. Some, such as "Déjeuner du Matin", are also often taught in American upper-level French classes, for the students to learn basics.

Some of Prévert's poems, such as "Les feuilles mortes" ("Autumn Leaves"), "L'Addition", "La grasse matinée" ("Sleeping in"), "Les bruits de la nuit" ("The sounds of the night") and "Chasse à l'enfant" ("The hunt for the child") were set to music by Joseph Kosma—and in some cases by Germaine Tailleferre of Les Six, Christiane Verger, Marjo Tal, and Hanns Eisler. They have been sung by prominent French vocalists, including Marianne Oswald, Yves Montand, and Édith Piaf, as well as by the later American singers Joan Baez and Nat King Cole. In 1961, French singer-songwriter Serge Gainsbourg paid tribute to "Les feuilles mortes" in his own song "La chanson de Prévert". "Les feuilles mortes" was also translated into German by the German poet and Liedermacher (singer-songwriter) Wolf Biermann, titled "Welke Blätter", and was performed by him and others.

The British remix DJs Coldcut released their own version in 1993. Another German version has been published and covered by Didier Caesar (alias Dieter Kaiser), which he named "Das welke Laub". "Les feuilles mortes" also bookends Iggy Pop's 2009 album Préliminaires.

Prévert's poems are translated into many languages worldwide. Many translators have translated his poems into English. The poet and translator Suman Pokhrel has translated some of his poems into Nepali.

== Films ==
Prévert wrote a number of screenplays for the film director Marcel Carné. Among them were the scripts for Drôle de drame (Bizarre, Bizarre, 1937), Quai des brumes (Port of Shadows, 1938), Le Jour se lève (Daybreak, 1939), Les Visiteurs du soir (The Night Visitors, 1942) and Children of Paradise (Les Enfants du Paradis, 1945). The last of these regularly gains a high placing in lists of best films ever and earned him an Oscar nomination for best original screenplay.

His poems were the basis for a film by the director and documentarian Joris Ivens, The Seine Meets Paris (La Seine a rencontré Paris, 1957), about the River Seine. The poem was read as narration during the film by singer Serge Reggiani. In 2007, a filmed adaptation of Prévert's poem "To Paint the Portrait of a Bird" was directed by Seamus McNally, featuring T.D. White and Antoine Ray- English translation by Lawrence Ferlinghetti.

Prévert had a long working relationship with Paul Grimault, also a member of Groupe Octobre. Together they wrote the screenplays of a number of animated movies, starting with the short "The Little Soldier" ("Le Petit Soldat", 1947). They worked together until his death in 1977, when he was finishing The King and the Mocking Bird (Le Roi et l'Oiseau), a second version of which was released in 1980. Prévert adapted several Hans Christian Andersen tales into animated or mixed live-action/animated movies, often in versions loosely connected to the original. Two of these were with Grimault, including The King and the Mocking Bird, while another was with his brother Pierre Prévert (fr).

Prévert's work Retour au pays was adapted into a student film by Youri Thobie and Gaston Thobie and won the main award at Mladá kamera.

== Bibliography ==
These include compilations of his poetry but also collaborations with Marc Chagall and humanist photographers on patriotic and poignant albums of imagery of post-war Paris.

- Paroles (1946)
- Le Petit Lion, illustrated by Ylla (1947, reprinted 1984)
- Contes pour enfants pas sages (Tales for naughty children) (1947)
- Des Bêtes, illustrated by Ylla (1950, reprinted 1984)
- Spectacle (1951)
- Grand bal du printemps, with photographs by Izis Bidermanas (1951)
- Lettre des îles Baladar (Letter from the Baladar Islands) (1952)
- Tour de chant (1953)
- La pluie et le beau temps (Rain and sunshine) (1955)
- Histoires (Stories) (1963)
- Les Halles: L'Album du Coeur de Paris, with photographs by Romain Urhausen (Editions des Deux Mondes, 1963)
- Le Cirque d'Izis, with photographs by Izis Bidermanas and original artwork by Marc Chagall (André Sauret, 1965)
- JON WAY (1966)
- Charmes de Londres, with photographs by Izis Bidermanas (Editions de Monza, 1999)

== Selected filmography ==
Prévert wrote the scenarios and sometimes the dialogue in the following films:

- Baleydier (1932)
- Ciboulette (1933)
- Hotel Free Exchange (1934)
- If I Were Boss (1934)
- Le Crime de monsieur Lange (1936)
- 27 Rue de la Paix (1936)
- Moutonnet (1936)
- Drôle de drame (1937)
- Quai des brumes (1938)
- Ernest the Rebel (1938)
- Les Disparus de Saint-Agil (1938) (fr)
- Le Jour se lève (1939)
- The Mysterious Mr. Davis (1939)
- Remorques (1941)
- Les Visiteurs du soir (1942)
- A Woman in the Night (1943)
- Summer Light (1943)
- Goodbye Leonard (1943)
- Les Enfants du paradis (1945)
- Les Portes de la nuit (1945)
- The Bellman (1945)
- Le Petit Soldat (The Little Soldier) (short animated film, 1947), with Paul Grimault, after The Steadfast Tin Soldier by Hans Christian Andersen
- Mystery Trip (1947)
- The Lovers of Verona (1949)
- La Bergère et le ramoneur (The Shepherdess and the Chimney Sweep) (animated film, 1953), with Paul Grimault after tale by Hans Christian Andersen, later revised and finished as Le Roi et l'oiseau
- The Hunchback of Notre Dame (1956)
- Le Petit Claus et le Grand Claus (fr), by Pierre Prévert, after the tale Little Claus and Big Claus by Hans Christian Andersen (live action and animation, 1964)
- Le diamant (The diamond) (short animated film, 1970), with Paul Grimault, complement to L'Aveu of Costa-Gavras
- Le Chien mélomane (The Music-Loving Dog) (short animated film, 1973), with Paul Grimault
- Le Roi et l'oiseau (animated film, 1980), with Paul Grimault

== See also ==
- Prix Jacques Prévert du Scénario
- Le Monde's 100 Books of the Century, a list which includes Paroles
