= L'Hôtel du libre échange =

Comedy by Georges Feydeau and Maurice Desvallières

Poster for 1903 revival at the Théâtre des Folies-Dramatiques

L'Hôtel du libre échange (French for Free-Exchange Hotel) is a comedy written by the French playwrights Georges Feydeau and Maurice Desvallières in 1894. The play takes place in 19th-century Paris and follows two Parisian households and their friends over the course of two days. The play has three acts: the first and final acts are set in Monsieur Pinglet's office, while the second act is set in a small Parisian hotel. The play has been translated into several other languages.

The vaudeville was first performed at the Théâtre des Nouveautés, Paris, on 5 December 1894. The Annales du Théâtre et de la Musique, noting that the laughter reverberated inside and out of the auditorium, said that a reviewer could only laugh and applaud rather than criticise. Another critic, predicting a long run, wrote that he and his colleagues would not be needed at the Nouveautés in their professional capacities for a year or so but would know where to come if they wanted to laugh. The play ran for 371 performances.

== Original cast ==
- Benoit Pinglet, builder – Alexandre Germain
- Henri Paillardin, architect and building inspector – Charles Colombey
- Mathieu, lawyer, friend of Monsieur and Madame Pinglet – M. Guyon, fils
- Maxime, Paillardin's nephew – M. Le Gallo
- Boulot, hotel clerk – M. Regnard
- Bastien Morillon, owner of Hôtel du Libre échange – M. Lauret
- Boucard, police inspector – M. Jaeger
- Ernest, an artist from Montmartre – M. Rablet
- Chervet, an assistant teacher – M. Raoul
- Commissionaire – M. Roger
- Marcelle, Paillardin's wife – Marguerite Caron
- Angélique, Pinglet's wife – Marguerite Macé-Montrouge
- Victoire, maid in the Pinglet household – Mme Murany
- Violette, Mathieu's daughter – Mme Cartouze
- Marguerite, Mathieu's daughter – Mme Sylviani
- Paquerette, Mathieu's daughter – Mme Desales
- Prevenche, Mathieu's daughter – Mme Boyer
- Lady, accompanying Ernest – Mme Cartier
- Hotel staff, policemen

Source: Playscript.

== Plot ==
The play is about two people who wish to engage in an extramarital affair. They check into a small, discreet Parisian hotel where they wish to spend the night, but complications arise and the couple never manage to exchange as much as a kiss.

=== Act I ===
The play opens in Monsieur Pinglet's office. He is visited by several people, including his neighbour Paillardin's wife Marcelle, whom he persuades to spend the night with him in a hotel in town. Pinglet arranges for his maid Victoire to follow Paillardin's nephew Maxime to philosophy school, as the boy is easily lost on his own.

Pinglet's wife Angelique comes on stage to declare to Pinglet that she will not be home for dinner; she has to spend the night out of town. She then shows Pinglet some hotel brochures she has been sent in the mail. She is disgusted by the brochures, but Pinglet is excited and decides to go to the advertised hotel with Marcelle.

Mathieu, an old friend of the Pinglets, comes for a visit. Mathieu, who suffers from a speech impediment when it rains, announces that he intends to stay at the Pinglets' house for a month. The Pinglets are horrified, especially at the arrival of Mathieu's four daughters, who also intend to stay there. Angelique initiates an argument with Pinglet in front of Mathieu, which prompts Mathieu to leave. Before leaving, however, he hears Pinglet and Marcelle discussing the hotel they are going to and decides to stay there for the night with his daughters.

After this, Pinglet tells Angelique that he intends to eat at a restaurant. Angelique does not want him to eat out alone and so locks him in his office. Pinglet takes out a rope ladder and climbs out of the window.

=== Act II ===
L'Hôtel du libre échange, 1906 revival

Act Two opens in the Hôtel du Libre Échange, introducing the audience to the hotel owner Bastien and his assistant Boulot. They throw out a guest who has not paid his bill, and he causes trouble by saying he will call the police to ransack the place.

Marcelle and Pinglet arrive and order a room. Pinglet tries to persuade Marcelle to get into bed with him but has obviously had too much to drink, and the alcohol and cigar smoke go to his head. He leaves the room to get some fresh air.

Paillardin arrives at the hotel, where he is led into a large room. He has been hired by the hotel owner to investigate reports of strange sounds and disturbances which the owner thinks are coming from ghosts. Paillardin leaves the room to get a drink.

Mathieu arrives at the hotel with his four daughters, and Boulot, not knowing that Paillardin is already booked into the haunted room, double-books Mathieu into it. Mathieu runs into Marcelle in the corridor. He invites himself into Marcelle's room for tea, and they are doing so when Pinglet comes back. Pinglet manages to make Mathieu leave. Mathieu and his daughters go into their own room, and Mathieu then helps himself to Paillardin's cigars, nightshirt, and slippers, thinking they are gifts from the hotel. When Paillardin arrives back from the café, he is angry to see his belongings gone and concludes that the supposed ghost is just a thief pretending to haunt the place. He goes to sleep in one of the beds.

Victoire arrives at the hotel with Maxime, having found one of Angelique's discarded hotel brochures and persuaded Maxime to go to the hotel with her instead of going back to philosophy school. They get a room.

The daughters amuse themselves by singing and making "ghost noises", but in the middle of it all Paillardin wakes up and is frightened by them. He goes running through the hotel yelling about ghosts, and the daughters themselves are scared into hysterics by Paillardin unexpectedly appearing in their room.

Maxime and Victoire are brought downstairs by the racket and are frightened when they discover Paillardin running around. After trying to hide in Mathieu's room, they exit the hotel.

Paillardin tries to get into Pinglet's and Marcelle's room to hide from the "ghosts" and, when he finally succeeds in breaking down the door, Pinglet hides in the fireplace. His face is black from the soot in the fireplace, so Paillardin does not recognise him. At this point the police arrive and arrest everyone. Marcelle, pretending to be married to Pinglet, gives her name to the police as Madame Pinglet. Monsieur Pinglet, on the other hand, tries the same tactic and gives his name as Monsieur Paillardin.

=== Act III ===
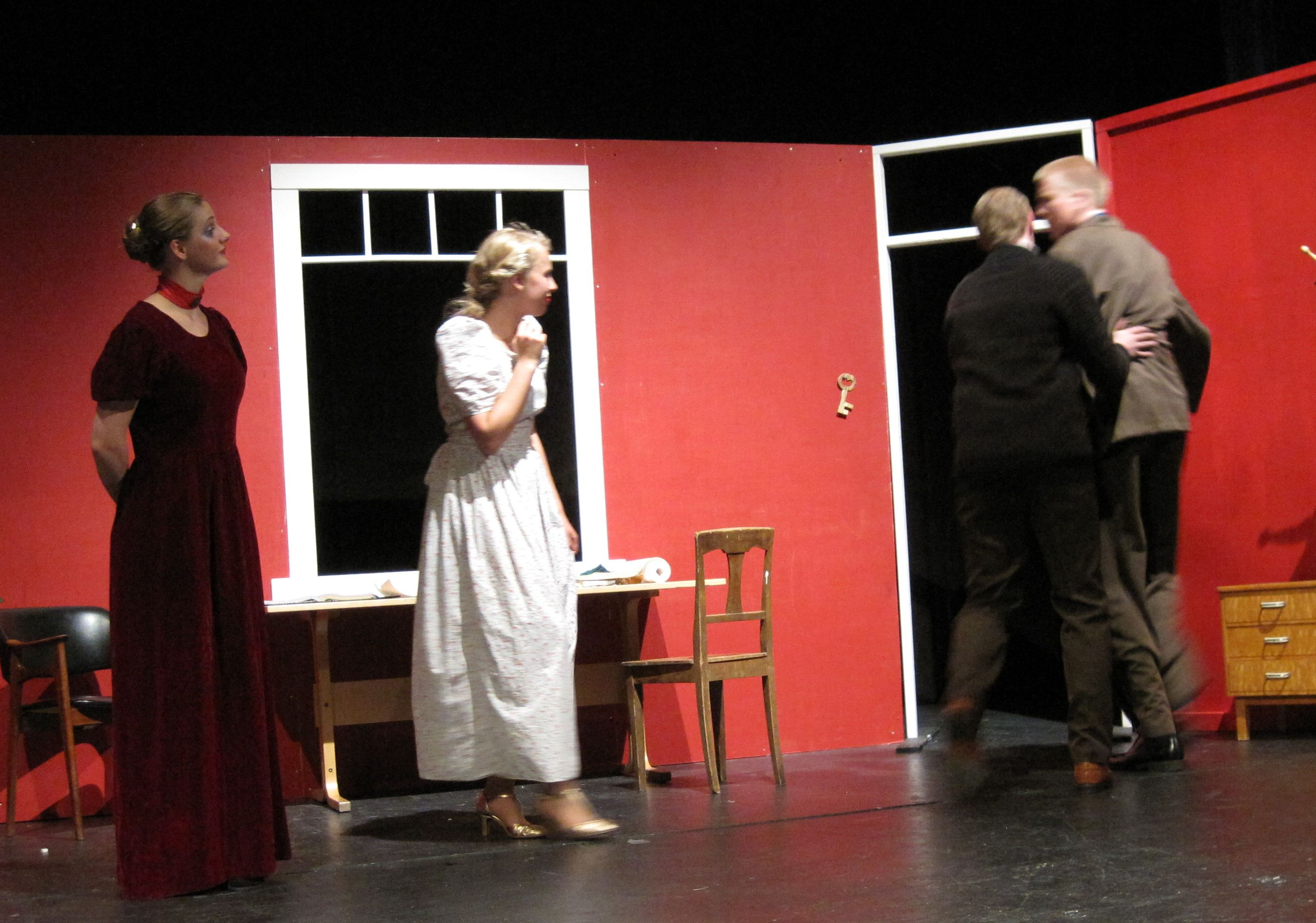
Act Three: Mathieu is pushed into the bedroom by Pinglet

Act Three opens in Pinglet's office the next morning, as he climbs in through his window and removes the soot from his face. Paillardin arrives and tells Pinglet of his terrible night and how he now believes in ghosts. He has no suspicion about Pinglet and Marcelle the previous night, but he remembers Marcelle's purple dress. Pinglet quickly tells Marcelle about this, so she can dispose of it. Marcelle gives the dress to Victoire.

Angelique is the next to arrive on stage, telling Pinglet in dramatic terms about how terrible a night she has had on a wild carriage journey through the countryside. She is overwhelming in her proclamations of love for Pinglet. Pinglet, however, is unfazed and, when a letter arrives to "Angelique" from the police station, he is quick to use this to his advantage. He confronts Angelique and Paillardin about the letter. Marcelle arrives.

At this point Mathieu arrives and tries to talk to the Pinglets about his terrible night. Pinglet, fearing that Mathieu will tell everyone else that they met last night, pushes him into the bedroom.

Police inspector Boucard arrives in Pinglet's office, and Angelique and Paillardin try to make him understand that they were not the people in l'Hôtel du Libre Échange. The police inspector does not intend to pursue the case, but is still hesitant to clear their names completely. Mathieu comes into the room and is about to tell everyone about who he met, when Maxime climbs in through the window and sees Mathieu. He does not want to be recognised and so covers his face with Pinglet's soot-stained handkerchief, inadvertently making his face black. When everyone sees his black face, they are convinced he is the man from the hotel. Maxime confesses that he was there with Victoire. Mathieu is then pushed out of the room. Boucard gives 5000 francs to Maxime, money that Pinglet had given the inspector as bail to be released from jail.

== Revivals and adaptations ==
The play was revived in Paris during the authors' lifetimes, at the Théâtre des Folies-Dramatiques in 1903 and the Théâtre de la Gaîté in 1906. After Feydeau died in 1921, his plays were neglected until the 1940s and 1950s. The first Parisian revival of L'Hôtel du libre échange after his death was at the Théâtre Marigny in 1956 with Olivier Hussenot as Pinglet in a production by Jean-Pierre Grenier. Since then there have been more than ten new productions in Paris and other French cities, including Jean-Claude Brialy as Pinglet at the Marigny in 1973. The Comédie-Française admitted the work to its repertoire in 2017 in a production by Isabelle Nanty, starring Michel Vuillermoz as Pinglet.

In the writers' lifetimes an English adaptation, The Gay Parisians, was staged in New York in September 1895 and ran for nearly 150 performances. a London version, A Night in Paris, opened in April 1896 and outran the Parisian original with a total of 531 performances. More recently L'Hôtel du libre échange was translated by Peter Glenville under the title Hotel Paradiso, playing in London in 1956 and starring Alec Guinness and on Broadway in 1957 starring Bert Lahr. Another translation made by John Mortimer under the title A Little Hotel on the Side opened in London in 1984 at the National Theatre with Graeme Garden as Pinglet; it was later produced on Broadway. and was revived at the Theatre Royal, Bath, in August 2013, starring Richard McCabe, Richard Wilson, and Hannah Waddingham.

== Film ==
Hotel Paradiso, based on Grenville's adaptation of the play, was released as a film in 1966, starring Gina Lollobrigida and Alec Guinness.
