= The Killer Inside Me =

1952 crime novel by Jim Thompson

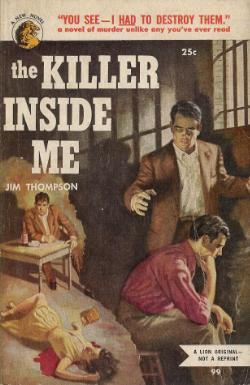
- Original paperback cover
- Author: Jim Thompson
- Language: English
- Genre: Crime novel
- Publication date: 1952
- Publication place: United States
- Media type: Print
- Pages: 356 pp

The Killer Inside Me is a 1952 novel by American writer Jim Thompson.

In the introduction to the anthology Crime Novels: American Noir of the 1950s, it is described as "one of the most blistering and uncompromising crime novels ever written."

== Plot summary ==
Lou Ford appears to be an unremarkable deputy sheriff in a small Texas town; beneath this facade, however, he is a cunning, depraved sociopath with sadistic sexual tastes. His main outlet for his dark urges is the relatively benign habit of deliberately needling people with clichés and platitudes despite their obvious boredom: "If there's anything worse than a bore," says Lou, "it's a corny bore."

Despite having a steady girlfriend, schoolteacher Amy Stanton, Ford falls into a passionate, sadomasochistic relationship with a prostitute named Joyce Lakeland. He describes their affair as unlocking "the sickness" that has plagued him since adolescence, when he was sexually mistreated by a babysitter and went on to sexually abuse a little girl, a crime for which his elder foster brother Mike took the blame to spare Lou from prison. After serving a jail term, Mike died at a construction site. Lou blamed a local construction magnate, Chester Conway, for his death, suspecting he was murdered for refusing to help further Conway's schemes.

To exact revenge, Lou and Joyce blackmail Conway to avoid exposing Joyce's affair with his son, Elmer. However, Lou double-crosses Joyce: he ferociously batters her and shoots Elmer, hoping to make the crimes appear to be a lovers' spat gone wrong. Elmer is killed instantly and Sheriff Bob Maples, Lou's mentor, reports that Joyce died after a short coma. Though Lou believes he has gotten away with the crime, county attorney Howard Hendricks becomes suspicious of his version of events, as well as his alibi, and a third person is suspected to be involved.

Suspicion soon falls on Johnnie Pappas, a young criminal who Lou has befriended and to whom he gave some of Conway's money, which is revealed to have been marked. Lou is allowed to enter the distressed Johnnie's cell alone in order to reason with him, only to murder him and stage the scene as a suicide. Though many accept that the case is closed, more people begin to suspect Lou of being involved, including Jeff Plummer, another deputy, and Amy, who presses marriage even after a sadomasochistic encounter with Lou begins to convince her that he is hiding a dark side.

A drifter whom Lou injured earlier attempts to blackmail him, revealing that he eavesdropped on a suspicious conversation Lou was involved in. Lou, seeing a way to tie up multiple loose ends, agrees to pay his blackmailer; he also agrees to elope with Amy, who he is planning to kill. On the night the drifter returns, Lou beats Amy to death, intending to frame the blackmailer for her murder. Plummer kills the drifter after Lou chases him through town, and Lou is sedated and taken home.

Lou is visited by Plummer and Hendricks at his home, and senses that they both suspect him in the murders. Plummer also reveals that Maples killed himself, convinced of Lou's guilt. They show him a letter that Amy had written and intended to give him during their elopement, one which subtly urges him to confess. Lou denies that the letter is incriminating, but Plummer and Hendricks force him into a jail cell, where they try unsuccessfully to provoke a confession with audio of Johnnie's voice and pictures of Amy.

Eventually, Lou's attorney arrives and secures his release, though he admits that he cannot help Lou leave town. Lou ruminates on his past, concluding that his hatred and violence, especially towards women, stemmed from a childhood incident involving his old housekeeper molesting him in order to get back at his father, with whom she was unhappily involved; Lou realizes that his female victims were substitutes for her. Accepting his fate, he covers his house in alcohol and candles, intending to kill himself by setting the building on fire. Eventually, Plummer and Hendricks arrive with a team of police, as well as Joyce, who is revealed to be alive, albeit badly injured. Joyce assures Lou that she did not sell him out, and he affirms his affection for her before stabbing her to death. The police fire on Lou, killing him, but destroying the house in the process.

== Film adaptations ==
In 1976, the novel was adapted into a film of the same title, directed by Burt Kennedy and starring Stacy Keach as Lou Ford and Tisha Sterling as Amy Stanton. A 2010 version written by John Curran, directed by Michael Winterbottom and starring Casey Affleck and Jessica Alba premiered at the Sundance Film Festival in January 2010, and was released in theaters later that year.

== Mentions in other works by Thompson ==
Lou Ford later appears in Thompson's novel Wild Town (1957). The Lou Ford character in Wild Town is a mirror image of the one in The Killer Inside Me. In Wild Town (also set in Texas, but in the 1920s) Lou Ford is also a sheriff, he also plays the fool, and he is also smarter and more capable than anyone else in the small town although he keeps it well hidden. He also prefers, and is usually able, to manipulate events rather than directly intervene. However, whereas Lou Ford manipulates events to further his own greed and lust in The Killer Inside Me, in Wild Town he manipulates events to bring about justice, to help people, and even to play matchmaker.

== Reception ==
Filmmaker Stanley Kubrick, who worked with Thompson on the scripts for the 1956 movie The Killing and the 1957 movie Paths of Glory, praised the novel, stating that it was "probably the most chilling and believable first-person story of a criminally warped mind I have ever encountered." C. Namwali Serpell has outlined a phenomenological, postcritical reading of The Killer Inside Me that exposes the limitations of purely ideological interpretations of the novel.

== In popular culture ==
- The song "The Killer Inside Me" by experimental hip-hop artist MC 900 Ft. Jesus is inspired by the novel.
- The post-punk/alternative-country rock band Green on Red titled their 1987 album The Killer Inside Me after the book.
