= L'affaire est dans le sac =

1932 film

L'affaire est dans le sac (English: It's in the Bag) is a 1932 French comedy film, directed by Pierre Prévert and written by his more famous brother, poet and screenwriter Jacques Prévert, based on a script by Ákos Ráthonyi. It was Pierre Prévert's directorial debut. Although it was not a box office success at the time, it is now considered a cult film.

== Plot ==
The plot involves a kidnapping. A hatter, Benjamin Déboisé, with an accomplice, undertake to kidnap the son of Hollister, a millionaire, abducting him in a bag. However, they mistakenly kidnap Hollister himself. Hollister, bored with life, is actually delighted to be involved in the adventure. Meanwhile, his daughter and a second accomplice fall in love, and Déboisé eventually disappears with the ransom.

== Cast ==
Étienne Decroux played the kidnapper Benjamin Déboisé. Other actors included a young Jean-Paul Le Chanois (billed as Jean-Paul Dreyfus), Julien Carette, Philippe Richard, Anthony Gildès, and Jacques Brunius. Future screenwriter Louis Chavance appears as a passer-by.

== Production ==
The film was produced by Pathé Distribution and was shot in eight days on a limited budget at the Pathé-Natan studios in Joinville-le-Pont. It premiered in France on 25 November 1932 and was not a success, although it went on to become something of a cult film.

At the time the film was made, Jaques Prévert had just formed October Group, a left wing agitprop troupe, and many of the film's technicians and some of the actors became involved with that group.
