= The Crime of Monsieur Lange =

- Directed by: Jean Renoir
- Screenplay by: Jacques Prévert
- Story by: Jean Renoir; Jean Castanier
- Produced by: André Halley des Fontaines; Jean Renoir
- Starring: René Lefèvre; Florelle; Jules Berry; Marcel Lévesque; Sylvia Bataille; Nadia Sibirskaïa
- Cinematography: Jean Bachelet
- Edited by: Marthe Huguet; Marguerite Renoir
- Music by: Joseph Kosma; Jean Wiener
- Production company: Films Obéron
- Distributed by: Warner Brothers
- Release date: 24 January 1936
- Running time: 80 minutes
- Country: France
- Language: French

The Crime of Monsieur Lange (French: Le Crime de Monsieur Lange [lə kʁim də məsjø lɑ̃ʒ]) is a 1936 French drama film directed by Jean Renoir about a publishing cooperative. Imbued with the spirit of the communist/socialist Popular Front, which would score a major political victory in 1936, the film is an idyllic picture of a socialist France and is both a social commentary and a romance. It was shot at the Billancourt Studios in Paris. The film's sets were designed by the art director Robert Gys. It was distributed by the French subsidiary of Warner Brothers.

== Plot ==
M. Lange is a mild-mannered writer of Western stories for a publishing company. Batala, the salacious owner of the company, flees his creditors. When his train crashes, he takes the opportunity to fake his own death. The abandoned workers, with the help of an eccentric creditor, form a cooperative. They have great success with Lange's stories about the cowboy, Arizona Jim, whose stories parallel the real-life experiences of the cooperative. At the same time, Lange and his neighbor Valentine, an old flame of Batala's, fall in love.

When Batala resurfaces, intending to reclaim the publishing company, Lange shoots and kills him to protect the cooperative. Lange and Valentine flee the country, stopping at an inn near the Belgian frontier where Valentine tells Lange's story to a group of the inn's patrons who had recognized Lange as the murderer on the run and threatened to alert the police. After hearing the story, the men sympathize with Lange and Valentine and allow them to escape across the border to freedom.

== Cast ==
- René Lefèvre as Amédée Lange
- Florelle as Valentine Cardès
- Jules Berry as Paul Batala
- Marcel Lévesque as The concierge
- Odette Talazac as The concierge's wife
- Sylvia Bataille as Edith
- Nadia Sibirskaïa as Estelle
- Henri Guisol as The son Meunier
- Maurice Baquet as Charles, the concierges' son
- Jacques B. Brunius as Mr. Baigneur
- Sylvain Itkine as Inspector Juliani, Batala's cousin
- Marcel Duhamelas Louis, the foreman
- René Génin as A client at the Auberge Inn
- Max Morise as Man with the pipe
- Jean Dasté as The model maker
- Paul Demange as Creditor

== Production ==
Renoir considered the film a collaboration with the agitprop theatre company the October Group. It was based on an original idea by Renoir and Jean Castanier titled Sur la cour (French: Sur la cour, lit. 'on the courtyard'). Poet and screenwriter Jacques Prévert wrote the script. The shooting lasted 25 days from October to November 1935 and took place at Le Tréport and in the Paris studios of Billancourt. It was during the shooting of the film that Paul Éluard introduced Pablo Picasso to Dora Maar, who served as set photographer for the production.

== Legacy ==
In his autobiography, Renoir claimed that the great success of The Crime of Monsieur Lange in France caused him to become strongly associated with the extreme political left wing. French communists asked him to produce overt propaganda films denouncing fascism, and he readily complied with the communists' demands, stating: "I believed that every honest man owed it to himself to resist Nazism. I am a filmmaker, and this is the only way in which I could play a part in the battle." Renoir's left-wing propaganda films of the mid-1930s, including The Crime of Monsieur Lange, along with his writings for various newspapers, placed him in danger when France entered World War II. Renoir's American friends, particularly the filmmaker Robert Flaherty, urged him to obtain a visa from the American consulate in Nice so that he may flee to the United States. He decided to do so after he claimed that Nazis had requested that he make films sympathetic to their cause.

Roger Leenhardt of Espirit called the film "all the more remarkable in that the work owes its witty style to the harmony of… two unshakably original temperaments… Prévert contributed his vivacity and mordant humor, and Renoir the resonance of his true romanticism." Peter Harcourt said that it was "in a sense the most intelligent film… Renoir ever made." François Truffaut wrote that "Mr. Lange is of all Renoir's films, the most spontaneous, the most dense set of miracles and camera, the busiest of truth and pure beauty, a film we would say touched by grace."

== See also ==
- Cinema of France
- List of French language films

== Sources ==
- Renoir, Jean. My Life and My Films, New York: Da Capo Press, 2000. ISBN 978-0306804571
