= Coup de Torchon =

1981 French satirical neo-noir dark comedy crime film by Bertrand Tavernier

- Theatrical poster
- Directed by: Bertrand Tavernier
- Screenplay by: Bertrand Tavernier; Jean Aurenche
- Based on: Pop. 1280 by Jim Thompson
- Produced by: Henri Lassa; Adolphe Viezzi
- Starring: Philippe Noiret; Isabelle Huppert; Jean-Pierre Marielle; Stéphane Audran; Eddy Mitchell; Guy Marchand; Irène Skobline
- Cinematography: Pierre-William Glenn
- Edited by: Armand Psenny
- Music by: Philippe Sarde
- Distributed by: Parafrance Films
- Release date: 4 November 1981
- Running time: 128 minutes
- Country: France
- Language: French
- Box office: $16.5 million

Coup De Torchon (also known as Clean Slate) is a 1981 French satirical neo-noir dark comedy crime film directed by Bertrand Tavernier and adapted from American author Jim Thompson's 1964 crime novel Pop. 1280. Starred by Philippe Noiret, Isabelle Huppert and Jean-Pierre Marielle. The film tells the story of a lazy, useless and disrespected police chief who becomes a cold-blooded killer and goes on a killing spree of local "villains" to "clean" his corrupt town and gain respect, reputation and honor. The film changes the novel's setting from an American Southern town to a small town in French West Africa.

The film had 2,199,309 admissions in France and was the 16th most attended film of the year. It received the Prix Méliès from the French Syndicate of Cinema Critics as the best French film of 1981.

Coup De Torchon was nominated for the Best Foreign Language Film at the 55th Academy Awards.

== Plot ==
The opening scene takes place during a solar eclipse (July 1938). The main character – Lucien Cordier – observes a group of starving African children eating sand to suppress their hunger. When the Sun is covered, the man lights a fire so the children can warm themselves.

In a small town in French West Africa in 1938, Lucien Cordier is the sole policeman. Unable or unwilling to assert his authority, he is scorned by everyone. His alluring wife, Huguette, openly lives with her lover, Nono, passing him off as her brother. Cordier is attracted to the playful young bride Rose but allows her abusive husband to beat her in the street without intervention. The head of the timber company, Vanderbrouck, daily insults him in public. Adding to his woes are a pair of deceitful pimps who openly flout the law and relish in humiliating him.

It's these pimps who push him over the edge, prompting him to consult his superior, Chavasson, who advises him to take decisive action. On the train back, he meets the attractive new French teacher, Anne, whom he immediately warms to. Upon his return, he confronts the two pimps alone, shooting them dead and disposing of their bodies in the river. When Chavasson discovers this, Cordier implicates him in the act. Having outsmarted his boss and eliminated his main tormentors, Cordier sets his sights on others who have made his life miserable. Rose's husband meets the same fate as the pimps, and Vanderbrouck is dumped in a privy. Nono, who spied on Cordier, gets beaten (not severely) by him after peeping Anne in the shower. When Rose's husband's servant, Vendredi, returns with his master's body, a furious Rose accidentally spills Cordier's dark secret, he kills the African boy as well (accusing him of sucking up to white people).

On the day of Rose's husband's funeral, the twin brother of one of the pimps arrives in the city to talk to Cordier. Soon after, the policeman confesses his general despair and specific crimes to Anne. He then steals the money Huguette had been saving to leave him and visits Rose. Huguette and Nono, suspecting he plans to flee with Rose and the money, go to her house to confront Cordier. They find Rose alone – none of the three realizes Cordier is hiding in the yard, waiting passively for events to unfold. In a struggle, Rose shoots them both in self-defense. Cordier gives her the money and urges her to flee and advises her to support herself by working as a prostitute. He is left with only Anne in his life.

In the closing scene, he's alone under a tree, observing a starving native child, getting ready to kill with his revolver, when more children show up (it's the same group as in the opening scene). He pauses, caressing his revolver.

== Cast ==
- Philippe Noiret as Lucien Cordier
- Isabelle Huppert as Rose
- Jean-Pierre Marielle as Le Peron and his brother
- Stéphane Audran as Huguette Cordier
- Eddy Mitchell as Nono
- Guy Marchand as Marcel Chavasson
- Irène Skobline as Anne, the teacher
- Michel Beaune as Vanderbrouck
- Jean Champion as Priest
- Victor Garrivier as Mercaillou
- Gérard Hernandez as Leonelli
- Abdoulaye Diop as Fête Nat
- Daniel Langlet as Paulo
- François Perrot as Colonel Tramichel
- Raymond Hermantier as Blind man
- Mamadou Dioumé as Mamadou
- Samba Mané as Vendredi ('Friday')

== Reception ==
=== Box office ===
The film had 2,199,309 admissions in France and was the 16th most attended film of the year.

=== Critical response ===
It received mixed reviews from U.S. and U.K. critics. Coup de Torchon has an approval rating of 88% on review aggregator website Rotten Tomatoes, based on 8 reviews, and an average rating of 7.9/10.

The New York Times praised the performances and "the meticulousness and conviction on display here" but also added that the film "seems strangely lacking in overall momentum and direction." Roger Ebert called it "a cruel intellectual joke played on its characters" and said the film "left me cold, unmoved and uninvolved." Time Out said "this eccentric, darkly comic look at a series of bizarre murders is stylishly well-crafted, and thoroughly entertaining" and "embellished with black wit and an elegant visual sense." TV Guide called it a "stylish, twisted black comedy... with as dead-on an evocation of a torpid, seedy backwater as anyone has achieved on screen."

=== Awards and honors ===
- French Syndicate of Cinema Critics (France)
  - Won: Best Film (tied with Garde à vue)
- Academy Awards (USA)
  - Nominated: Best Foreign Language Film
- César Awards (France)
  - Nominated: Best Actor – Leading Role (Philippe Noiret)
  - Nominated: Best Actor – Supporting Role (Jean-Pierre Marielle)
  - Nominated: Best Actor – Supporting Role (Eddy Mitchell)
  - Nominated: Best Actress – Leading Role (Isabelle Huppert)
  - Nominated: Best Actress – Supporting Role (Stéphane Audran)
  - Nominated: Best Director (Bertrand Tavernier)
  - Nominated: Best Editing (Armand Psenny)
  - Nominated: Best Film
  - Nominated: Best Production Design (Alexandre Trauner)
  - Nominated: Best Screenplay, Dialogue or Adaptation (Jean Aurenche and Bertrand Tavernier)

== See also ==
- Isabelle Huppert on screen and stage
- List of submissions to the 55th Academy Awards for Best Foreign Language Film
- List of French submissions for the Academy Award for Best Foreign Language Film
