= Erich von Stroheim =

Austrian-American actor and director (1885–1957)

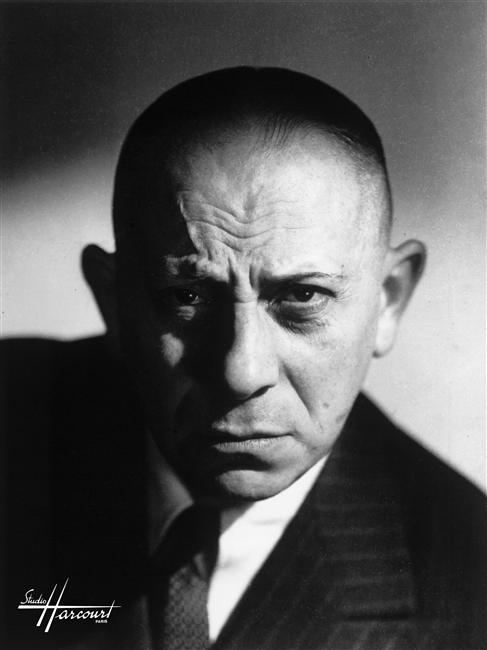
- Stroheim in 1946
- Born: Erich Oswald Stroheim; September 22, 1885; Vienna, Austria-Hungary
- Died: May 12, 1957 (aged 71); Maurepas, Seine-et-Oise, France
- Occupations: Director; screenwriter; actor; producer
- Years active: 1914–1955
- Spouses: Margaret Knox (m. 1913; div. 1915) Mae Jones (m. 1916; div. 1919) Valerie Germonprez (m. 1920; sep. 1936)
- Partner: Denise Vernac (1939–1957)
- Children: 2, including Josef von Stroheim

Erich Oswald Hans Carl Maria von Stroheim (born Erich Oswald Stroheim, Austrian German: [ˈʃtroːhaɪm]; September 22, 1885 – May 12, 1957) was an Austrian-American director, screenwriter, actor and producer, most noted as a film star and avant-garde, visionary director of the silent era. His 1924 film Greed (an adaptation of Frank Norris's 1899 novel McTeague), originally over nine hours long, was edited against his wishes to about two-and-a-half hours; despite initial negative reception, the theatrical release is considered one of the greatest films ever made. After clashes with Hollywood studio bosses over budget and workers' rights problems, Stroheim found it difficult to find work as a director and subsequently became a well-respected character actor, particularly in French cinema. As an actor, he was nominated for the Academy Award for Best Supporting Actor for his performance as Max von Mayerling in Sunset Boulevard (1950).

For his early innovations, Stroheim is still celebrated as one of the first of the auteur directors. He helped introduce more sophisticated plots and noirish sexual and psychological undercurrents into cinema. He died of prostate cancer in France in 1957, at the age of 71. Beloved by Parisian neo-Surrealists known as Lettrists, he was honored by Lettrist Maurice Lemaître with a 70-minute 1979 film titled Erich von Stroheim.

== Background and personal life ==
Stroheim was born in Vienna, Austria, in 1885 as Erich Oswald Stroheim (some sources give Hans Erich Maria Stroheim von Nordenwall, but this seems to have been an assumed name, see below), the son of Benno Stroheim, a middle-class hatmaker, and Johanna Bondy, both of whom were observant Jews.

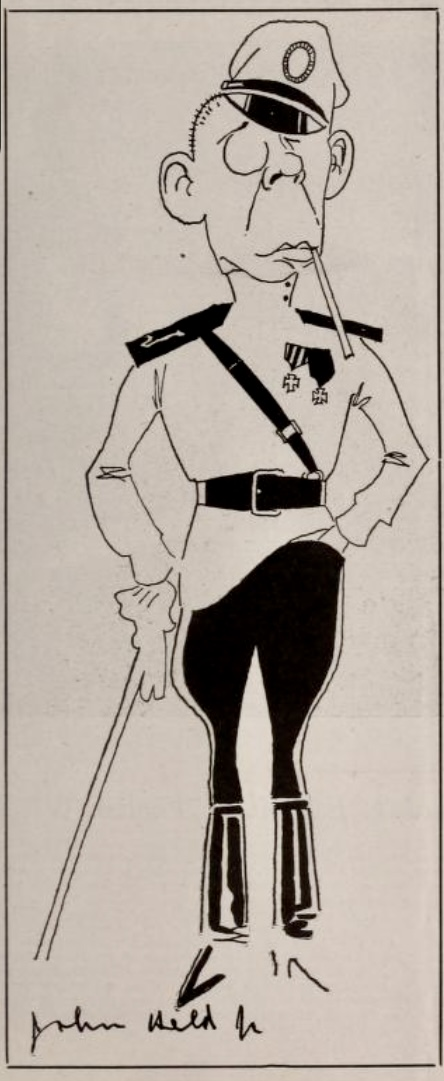
Erich Von Stroheim caricature by John Held Jr.

Stroheim deserted his military service and emigrated to America aboard the SS Prinz Friedrich Wilhelm on November 26, 1909. On arrival at Ellis Island, he claimed to be Count Erich Oswald Hans Carl Maria von Stroheim und Nordenwall, the son of Austrian nobility like the characters he would go on to play in his films. However, he first found work as a traveling salesman – work which took him to San Francisco and then Hollywood.

Billy Wilder and Stroheim's agent Paul Kohner, both fellow Austrians, claimed that he spoke with a decidedly lower-class Austrian accent. His years in America seem to have affected his speech, though. In The Great Gabbo, Stroheim's German, though fluid, has Midwestern American r's. Later, while living in Europe, Stroheim claimed in published remarks to have "forgotten" his native tongue. In Renoir's movie La Grande Illusion, Stroheim speaks German with what seems to be an American accent. Similarly, in his French-speaking roles, von Stroheim speaks with a noticeable American accent. Jean Renoir writes in his memoirs: "Stroheim spoke hardly any German. He had to study his lines like a schoolboy learning a foreign language."

However, the fashion photographer Helmut Newton, whose first language was German, used a clip from a Stroheim film on which to base one of his fantasy nude photographs, and he has commented that in the clip Stroheim speaks "a very special kind of Prussian officer lingo – it's very abrupt: it's very, very funny".

Stroheim was married three times. He was married to Margaret Knox from 1913 to 1915; His second marriage was to Mae Jones from 1916 to 1919. He was never divorced from his third wife Valerie Germonprez, though he lived with actress Denise Vernac, from 1939 until his death. Vernac also starred with him in several films. Stroheim's two sons eventually joined the film business: Erich Jr. (1916–1968) as an assistant director and Josef (1922–2002) as a sound editor.

After appearing in 1950's Sunset Boulevard, Stroheim moved to France where he spent the last part of his life. There his silent film work was much admired by artists in the French film industry. In France he acted in films, wrote several novels that were published in French, and worked on various unrealized film projects. He was awarded the French Legion of Honour shortly before his death.

In 1956, Stroheim began to suffer severe back pain, which was diagnosed as cancer. He eventually became paralyzed and was carried to his drawing room to receive the Legion of Honor award from an official delegation. He died at his chateau in Maurepas near Paris on May 12, 1957, at age 71.

== Film career ==
By 1914, he was working in Hollywood. He began working in movies as a stuntman, and then in bit-parts and as a consultant on German culture and fashion. His first film, in 1915, was The Country Boy, in which he was uncredited. His first credited role came in Old Heidelberg.

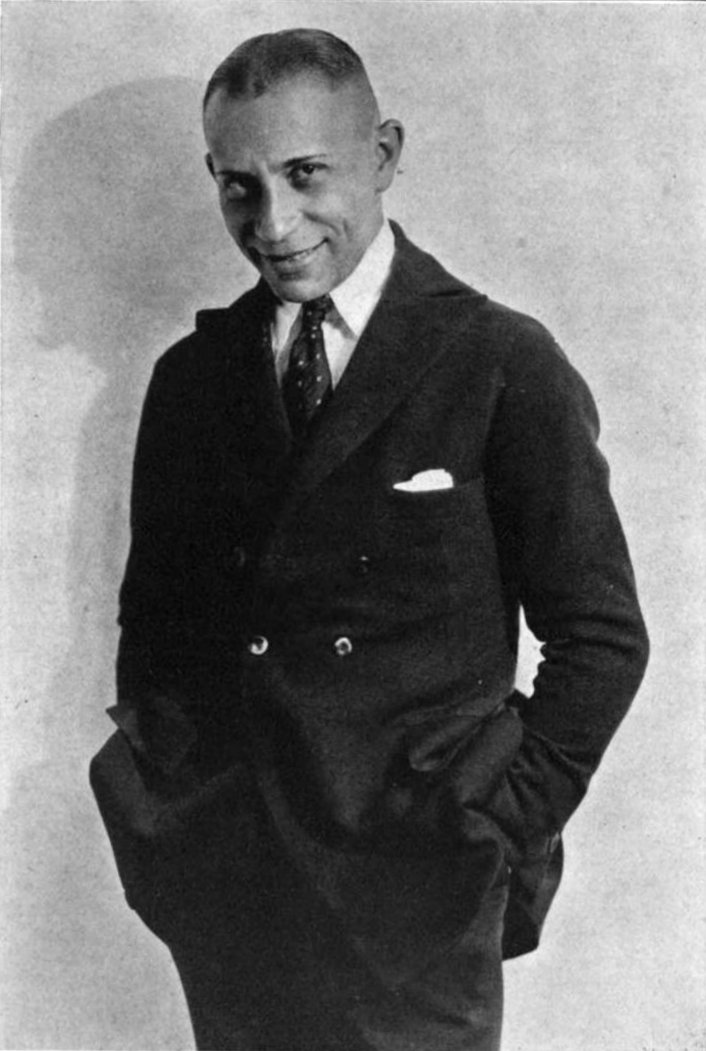
Stroheim, c. 1920

He began working with D. W. Griffith, taking an uncredited role as a Pharisee in Intolerance. Additionally, Stroheim acted as one of the many assistant directors on Intolerance, a film remembered in part for its huge cast of extras. Later, with America's entry into World War I, he played sneering German villains in such films as Sylvia of the Secret Service and The Hun Within. In The Heart of Humanity, he tears the buttons from a nurse's uniform with his teeth, and when disturbed by a crying baby, throws it out of a window.

Following the end of the war, Stroheim turned to writing and then directed his own script for Blind Husbands in 1919. He also starred in the film. As a director, Stroheim was known to be dictatorial and demanding, often antagonizing his actors. He is considered one of the greatest directors of the silent era, creating films that represent cynical and romantic views of human nature. In the 1932 film The Lost Squadron, Stroheim played a parody of himself as a fanatic German film director making a World War I movie, who orders extras playing dead soldiers to "Stay dead!" Recurring tropes in his films include the portrayal of janitors, and the depiction of characters with physical disabilities.

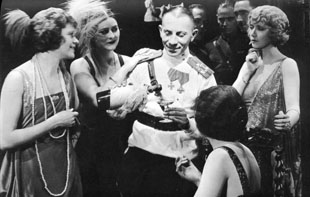
Stroheim as Sergius Karamzin in Foolish Wives, 1922

His next directorial efforts were the lost film The Devil's Pass Key (1919) and Foolish Wives (1922), in which he also starred. Studio publicity for Foolish Wives claimed that it was the first film to cost $1 million.

In 1923, Stroheim began work on Merry-Go-Round. He cast the American actor Norman Kerry as Count Franz Maximilian von Hohenegg, a part written for himself, and newcomer Mary Philbin in the lead actress role. However studio executive Irving Thalberg fired Stroheim during filming and replaced him with director Rupert Julian.

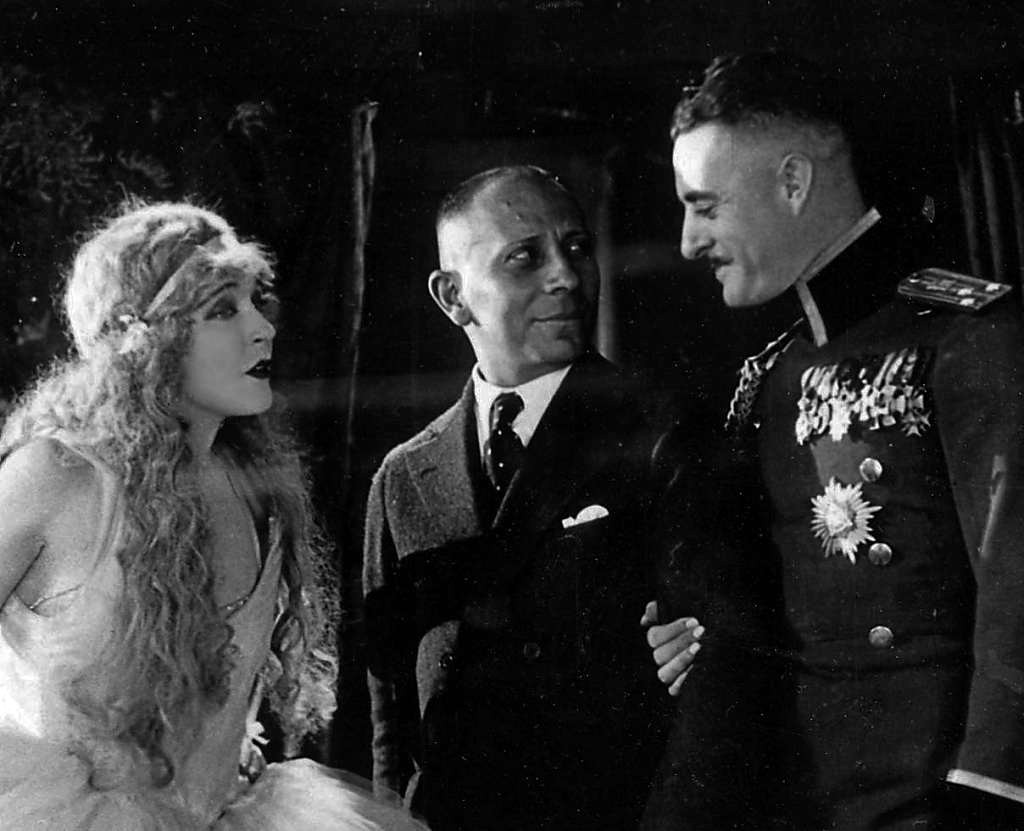
On the set of The Merry Widow (1925), L to R: Mae Murray, von Stroheim, John Gilbert

Probably Stroheim's best remembered work as a director is Greed, a detailed filming of the novel McTeague by Frank Norris. He originally started it as a project with Samuel Goldwyn's Goldwyn Pictures. Stroheim had long wanted to do a film version of the book. He originally intended it to be a highly detailed reproduction of the original, shot mostly at the locations described in the book in San Francisco and Death Valley. Von Stroheim shot in San Francisco with his actors in period dress and silent movie makeup while the city itself was represented in its modern form. Automobiles can be seen in the background of some scenes and any "extras" or passersby are in (what was for the time) modern clothing. When the production did move to Death Valley it was in the middle of summer. Greed is also considered by some film historians to be the first feature-length film shot on location. The original print ran for an astonishing 10 hours. Knowing this version was far too long, Stroheim cut almost half the footage, reducing it to a six-hour version to be shown over two nights. It still was deemed too long, so Stroheim and director Rex Ingram edited it into a four-hour version that could be shown in two parts.

However, in the midst of filming, Goldwyn Pictures was bought by Marcus Loew and merged into Metro-Goldwyn-Mayer. After rejecting Stroheim's attempts to cut it to less than three hours, MGM removed Greed from his control and gave it to head scriptwriter June Mathis, with orders to cut it to a manageable length. Mathis gave the print to a cutter, who reduced it to 2.5 hours. The shortened release version was a box-office failure, and was angrily disowned by Stroheim. In particular, he blamed Mathis for destroying his pet project, since she was credited as a writer due to contractual obligations. However, Mathis had worked with Stroheim before and had long admired him, so it is not likely she would have indiscriminately butchered his film. The film was partially reconstructed in 1999 by producer Rick Schmidlin, using the existing footage mixed with surviving still photographs, but the original cut of Greed has passed into cinema lore as a lost masterpiece.

Stroheim followed with a commercial project, The Merry Widow, his most commercially successful film; the more personal The Wedding March, as well as the now-lost The Honeymoon.

Stroheim's unwillingness or inability to modify his artistic principles for the commercial cinema, his extreme attention to detail, his insistence on near-total artistic freedom and the resulting costs of his films led to fights with the studios. As time went on, he received fewer directing opportunities.

In 1929, Stroheim was dismissed as the director of the film Queen Kelly, after disagreements with star Gloria Swanson and producer and financier Joseph P. Kennedy over the mounting costs of the film and Stroheim's introduction of indecent subject matter into the film's scenario.

After Queen Kelly and Walking Down Broadway, a project from which Stroheim was also dismissed, Stroheim returned to working principally as an actor, in both American and French films.

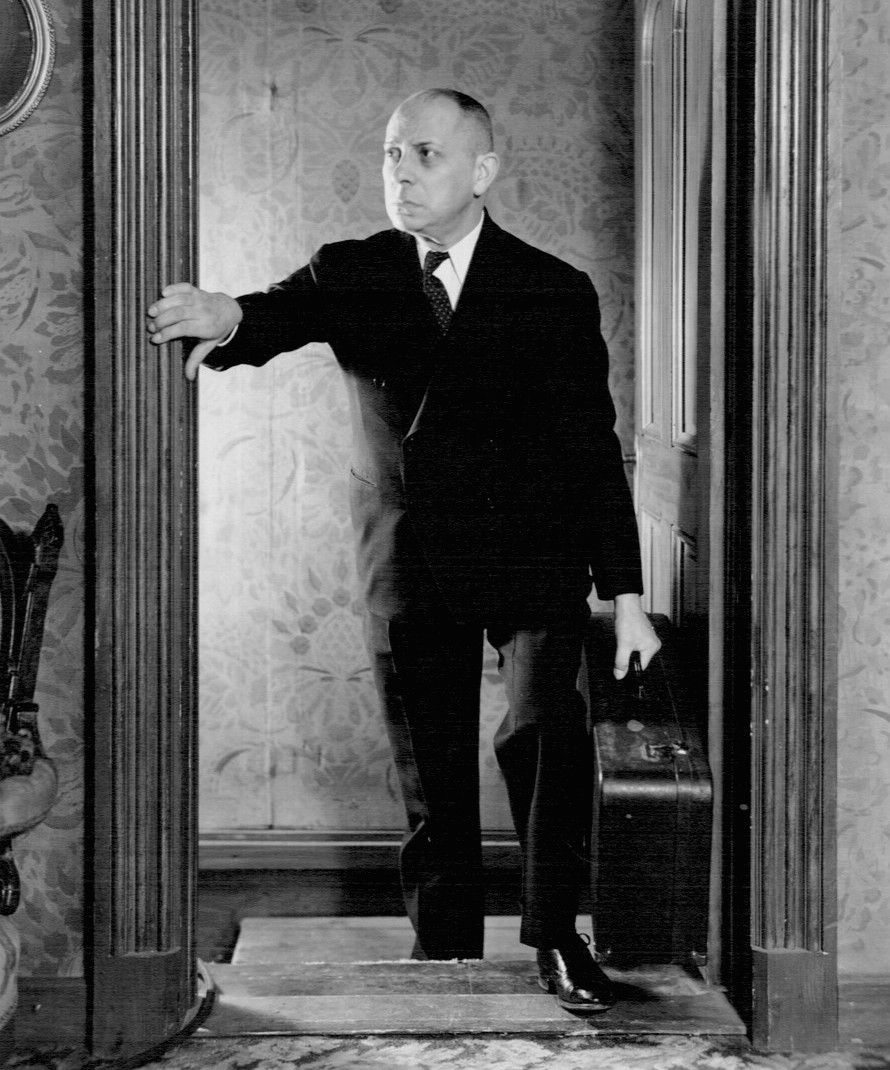
Stroheim also performed on stage. Here he portrays Jonathan Brewster in the 1941–1943 Broadway production of Arsenic and Old Lace. He assumed that role from Boris Karloff, who was in the play's original cast.

His stern nature, as well as some of his villainous roles, earned him the nickname "the man you love to hate".

Working in France on the eve of World War II, Stroheim was prepared to direct the film La dame blanche from his own story and screenplay. Jean Renoir wrote the dialogue, Jacques Becker was to be assistant director and Stroheim himself, Louis Jouvet and Jean-Louis Barrault were to be the featured actors. Max Cossvan was to produce the film for Demo-Film. The production was prevented by the outbreak of the war on September 1, 1939, and Stroheim returned to the United States.

Stroheim is perhaps best known as an actor for his role as Rauffenstein in Jean Renoir's La Grande Illusion (1937) and as Max von Mayerling in Billy Wilder's Sunset Boulevard (1950). For the latter film, which also starred Gloria Swanson, Stroheim was nominated for the Academy Award for Best Supporting Actor. Excerpts from Queen Kelly were used in the film. The Mayerling character states that he used to be one of the three great directors of the silent era, along with D. W. Griffith and Cecil B. DeMille; many film critics agree that Stroheim was indeed one of the great early directors. Stroheim's character in Sunset Boulevard thus had an autobiographical basis that reflected the humiliations suffered throughout his career.

He appeared as a guest star in the 1953 anthology drama television series Orient Express in the episode titled The Man of Many Skins.

== Filmography ==
=== As director ===
Year	Title	Role	Notes
1919	Blind Husbands	Lieutenant Eric Von Steuben	Director, screenwriter, producer, and star: von Stroheim. Set in the Austrian Alps. Extant.
1920	The Devil's Pass Key		Director and screenwriter: von Stroheim. Set in Paris. The film is lost.
1922	Foolish Wives	Count Wladislaw Sergius Karamzin (Russian Captain of Hussars): false Russian nobleman and con artist	Director, screenwriter, and star: von Stroheim. Extant.
1924	Greed	Balloon vendor - uncredited	Director and screenplay adaptation: von Stroheim. Based on Frank Norris's 1899 novel McTeague. Original version is lost. Two-hour truncated version extant.
1925	The Merry Widow		Director, screenwriter, and producer: von Stroheim. Extant.
1928	The Wedding March	Nicki / Prince Nickolas von Wildeliebe-Rauffenburg. Co-starring role.	Director and star: von Stroheim. Co-stars: Fay Wray and ZaSu Pitts. Set in Vienna. Extant.
1931	The Honeymoon	Nikki	Director, writer, and star: von Stroheim. Sequel to The Wedding March. Only known copy was destroyed in a fire in the 1950s.
1932	Queen Kelly		Director, screenwriter, co-producer: von Stroheim. Produced in 1929. Silent film. Extant.
1933	Hello, Sister!		Co-director, co-writer. Originally produced as Walking Down Broadway, retitled and re-worked by other directors. Released without director credit. Original version lost.

=== As actor ===
Year	Title	Role	Notes
1912	An Unseen Enemy	Man in straw hat dancing by desk in lobby	Director: D. W. Griffith. Co-stars: Lillian Gish and Dorothy Gish. Short Film. Extant.
1915	The Failure	Minor Role	Uncredited
1915	Ghosts	Minor Role	Uncredited
1915	Old Heidelberg	Lutz: Prince Karl's valet; film about university life	Director: John Emerson. Co-stars: Wallace Reid and Dorothy Gish. Extant.
1916	His Picture in the Papers	Anti-vegetarian silent comedy set in NYC, von Stroheim plays an eye-patch-wearing gang member of the "Weazels"	Director: John Emerson. Co-written by Anita Loos. Starring Douglas Fairbanks. Extant.
1916	The Flying Torpedo	Accomplice—a German officer	Directors: John B. O'Brien & Christy Cabanne. Futuristic: Set in 1921. Lost.
1916	Macbeth		Uncredited
1916	Intolerance	Second Pharisee	Uncredited
1916	The Social Secretary	The Buzzard: a nosy NYC newspaper reporter (featured role)	Director: John Emerson. Uncredited Second Director: von Stroheim. Producer: D. W. Griffith. Screenplay: John Emerson and Anita Loos. Starring: Norma Talmadge. Set in NYC. American production. Romantic comedy. Extant.
1917	Panthea	Lieutenant of Police	
1917	In Again, Out Again	Officer	Uncredited
1917	For France	Minor Role	Uncredited
1917	Draft 258		
1917	Reaching for the Moon	Prince Badinoff's Aide	Uncredited
1917	Sylvia of the Secret Service	Minor Role	Also Assistant director
1917	Who Goes There?		
1918	The Unbeliever	Lt. Kurt von Schnieditz	Director: Alan Crosland. Propaganda and war film. Set in the trenches during World War I. Extant.
1918	Hearts of the World	A Hun	
1918	The Hun Within	Von Bickel	
1918	The Heart of Humanity	Eric von Eberhard - a lecherous "Hun"	Director: Allen Holubar. War and Propaganda film. Follows the story of an American Red Cross nurse stationed in Belgium and France during World War I. Extant.
1919	Blind Husbands	Lieutenant Eric Von Steuben	Director, screenwriter, producer, and star: von Stroheim. Set in the Austrian Alps. Extant.
1920	The Devil's Pass Key		Director and screenwriter: von Stroheim. Set in Paris. The film is lost.
1922	Foolish Wives	Count Wladislaw Sergius Karamzin (Russian Captain of Hussars): false Russian nobleman and con artist	Director, screenwriter, and star: von Stroheim. Set in Monaco. Comedy. Extant.
1923	Souls for Sale	Himself	
1928	The Wedding March	The Wedding March - a European-based romantic drama.	Director and co-star: Erich von Stroheim. Screenplay source: Harry Carr's short story Extant
1929	The Great Gabbo	The Great Gabbo - an American based ventriloquist. Starring role.	Director: James Cruze. Screenplay source: Ben Hecht's short story "The Rival Dummy". Von Stroheim's "talkie" debut. Drama and Musical. Extant.
1930	Three Faces East	Valdar / Shiller / Blecher: London butler who is actually a powerful German spy. Co-starring role.	Director: Roy Del Ruth. Score: Paul Lamkoff. Co-Star: Constance Bennett. Set in London during World War I. American production. War drama. Extant.
1931	Friends and Lovers	Victor Sangrito: a cruel, blackmailing husband and rare porcelain dealer. Featured role.	Director: Victor Schertzinger. Adapted from a novel by: Maurice Dekobra. Score: Victor Schertzinger and Max Steiner. Costumes: Max Ree. Art Production: Max Ree. Co-starring: Adolphe Menjou, Lili Damita, Laurence Olivier. Set in Calcutta amid the British Raj. American production. Drama. Extant.
1932	The Lost Squadron	Arthur von Furst: dictatorial Hollywood film director. Co-starring role.	Directors: George Archainbaud and Paul Sloane. Co-stars: Mary Astor and Joel McCrea. Three World War I flying aces find work in Hollywood as film stunt pilots post-war. Likely based to some extent on the tragic death of Mary Astor's newly wed husband and Howard Hawks's brother Kenneth Hawks. Astor and Kenneth Hawks had been married only two years and were living on Appian Way in Laurel Canyon (in a house later owned by Ida Lupino) when Kenneth, directing a film about World War I flying aces, crashed into the waves in Santa Monica, California when a stunt plane and his film-crew plane collided mid-air. Drama. Extant.
1932	As You Desire Me	Carl Salter: alcoholic Budapest-based novelist. Co-starring role.	Director: George Fitzmaurice. Costumes: Adrian. Based on a story by Luigi Pirandello. Also starring Greta Garbo and Melvyn Douglas. An Italian countess with amnesia post-World War I lives in Budapest with her cruel lover (von Stroheim) and then reunites with her husband (Melvyn Douglas). U.S. production. Drama. Extant.
1934	Fugitive Road	Hauptmann Oswald von Traunsee: Austrian military officer in charge of a border outpost during World War I. Starring role.	Directors: Frank R. Strayer. American production. War comedy. Extant.
1934	Crimson Romance	Captain Wolters: World War I German airforce officer. Featured role.	Director: David Howard. A German-American leaves the U.S. and joins the German air force, driven out by anti-German hysteria. His best friend accompanies him and also joins the air force. They both fall in love with the same woman, an ambulance driver. Von Stroheim is a supporting player. Low-budget. War drama. Extant.
1936	The Crime of Dr. Crespi	Dr. Andre Crespi: invents a serum that allows him to bury his victims alive. Starring role.	Director: John H. Auer. Based on Edgar Allan Poe's short story "The Premature Burial". American production. Low budget. Horror. Extant.
1937	Marthe Richard	Baron Erich von Ludow: World War I naval attache and spymaster who commits suicide over romantic and national betrayals. Co-starring role.	Director: Raymond Bernard. Based on French prostitute, spy, and politician Marthe Richard. Von Stroheim's character based on German officer and naval attache Hans von Krohn. Set in Germany, France and Spain during and pre-World War I. French production. War drama and biopic. Extant.
1937	La Grande Illusion	Captain von Rauffenstein: commander of a POW camp/castle. Featured role.	Director: Jean Renoir. Co-starring Dita Parlo and Jean Gabin. The cultural importance of this film cannot be overstated. Nominated for an Academy Award. Set during World War I. French production. War drama. Extant.
1937	Under Secret Orders a.k.a. Mademoiselle Docteur	Col. W. Mathesius / Simonis: German officer, spy, and spy recruiter. Co-starring role.	Director: Edmond T. Greville. Co-starring: Dita Parlo and Claire Luce. Set in London during World War I. Based on a Pabst film. Remade by Sam Wood as Stamboul Quest (1934) and Alberto Lattuada as Fräulein Doktor (1969). British production. War drama. Extant.
1937	The Alibi	le professeur Winckler: a Parisian nightclub hypnotist, conman, and murderer. Starring role.	Director: Pierre Chenal. Co-starring: Albert Préjean and Louis Jouvet. Set in Paris. Low budget. French production. Murder mystery. Extant.
1938	Rail Pirates	Tchou King	
1938	The Lafarge Case	Denis	
1938	Boys' School a.k.a. Les Disparus de Saint-Agil.	Walter: eerie English language teacher at Parisian boarding school. Featured role.	Director: Christian-Jaque. Adapted from a novel of the same title by Pierre Véry. Some dialogue by: Jacques Prévert. Co-starring: Charles Aznavour and Serge Reggiani. French production. Murder mystery. Extant.
1938	Ultimatum	Yugoslavian General and Prime Minister Dušan Simović.	Directors: Robert Wiene and Robert Siodmak. Co-starring: Dita Parlo. Adapted from the novel Days Before the Storm by Ewald Bertram. Historical film depicting the July Crisis in Serbia and the events leading to World War I. In exile from Nazi Germany, director Robert Wiene, famous for his silent film The Cabinet of Dr. Caligari (1920), died from a heart attack and the effects of cancer while making this film. His friend, director Robert Siodmak, took over production. French production. War drama/Historical drama. Extant.
1938	Gibraltar	Marson: supposed hairdresser who is actually a terrorist blowing up UK battleships in Gibraltar. Co-starring role.	Director: Fedor Ozep/ Fyodor Otsep. Co-star: Viviane Romance as a flamenco dancer. French production. War drama. Extant.
1939	Behind the Facade	Eric: card sharp cheating with his business partner's American fiancée. Both recently naturalized French citizens. Cameo.	Directors: Georges Lacombe and Yves Mirande. Also featured: Michel Simon and Lucien Baroux. Ensemble cast featured in vignettes. Comic murder mystery. French production. Extant.
1939	The World Will Tremble	Emil Lasser / Monsieur Frank	
1939	Immediate Call	Captain Stanley Wells	
1939	Personal Column in France known as Pieges	Pears: Parisian fashion designer. Featured role.	Director:Robert Siodmak. Co-starring: Maurice Chevalier and Pierre Renoir. Remade in 1947 by Douglas Sirk as Lured starring Lucille Ball. French production. Murder mystery. Extant.
1940	Threats	Le professeur Hoffman	
1940	Thunder Over Paris	Korlick	
1940	I Was an Adventuress	Andre Desormeaux: international jewel thief. Co-starring role.	Director: Gregory Ratoff. Score: David Buttolph. Co-stars: Peter Lorre and Vera Zorina. Set in Europe and Paris. Caper comedy. American (Twentieth Century Fox) production. Extant.
1941	So Ends Our Night	Brenner: Nazi SS officer tries to tempt escaped concentration camp refugee into naming names. Featured role.	Director: John Cromwell. Adapted from a novel by Erich Maria Remarque. Co-starring: Fredric March, Margaret Sullavan, and Glenn Ford. American production. War drama. Extant.
1942	Macao	Werner von Krall: international arms smuggler and dealer. Co-starring role.	Director: Jean Delannoy. France's Vichy government insisted Delannoy, and producer Andre Paulve delete all of von Stroheim's scenes and replace him with actor Pierre Renoir. In 1945, von Stroheim's role was restored in the film. French production. Extant.
1943	Five Graves to Cairo	Field Marshal Erwin Rommel. Co-starring role.	Director: Billy Wilder. Screenplay: Billy Wilder and Charles Brackett. Score: Miklós Rózsa. Cinematography: John F. Seitz. Costumes: Edith Head. Co-starring: Franchot Tone, Anne Baxter, and Akim Tamiroff. Semi-comic approach to the material. Filmed in the Mojave and Yuma Arizona deserts. American production. War drama and historical film. Extant.
1943	The North Star	Dr. von Harden: Nazi doctor who drains blood from Ukrainian village children to infuse into German soldiers. Featured role.	Director: Lewis Milestone. Original story and screenplay: Lillian Hellman. Cinematography: James Wong Howe. Score: Aaron Copland. Co-stars: Anne Baxter, Dana Andrews, Walter Huston, Walter Brennan, Jane Withers, Farley Granger, Dean Jagger. American production. War drama/propaganda. Extant.
1944	The Lady and the Monster	Prof. Franz Mueller: experimental scientist who keeps a dead miser's brain alive. Starring role.	Director: George Sherman. Adapted from Curt Siodmak's novel Donovan's Brain. Co-star: Vera Ralston. Cinematography: John Alton. Gothic castle in the Arizona desert. Remade in 1953 as Donovan's Brain. American production. Low budget. Horror film. Extant.
1944	Storm Over Lisbon	Deresco: spy for Japan who owns a Lisbon nightclub as a front. Co-starring role.	Director: George Sherman. Cinematography: John Alton. Co-star: Vera Ralston. American production. Low budget. War drama. Extant.
1945	The Great Flamarion	The Great Flamarion: ex-World War I German army officer working as a sharpshooter in the American vaudeville circuit. Starring role.	Director: Anthony Mann. Score: Alexander Laszlo. Co-starring: Mary Beth Hughes and Dan Duryea. Set in Mexico City, Philadelphia, San Francisco, and Los Angeles. Anthony Mann's seventh film. Von Stroheim's first film noir. American production. Low budget. Film Noir. Extant.
1945	Scotland Yard Investigator	Carl Hoffmeyer: infamous German art collector determined to steal the Mona Lisa at outbreak of World War 2. Starring role.	Director: George Blair. Set in Paris and London. American production. Low budget. War drama. Extant.
1946	The Mask of Diijon	Diijon: famous hypnotist attempts a comeback in the American nightclub circuit. Starring role.	Director: George Blair. American production. Low budget. Film noir. Extant.
1946	That's Not the Way to Die	Eric von Berg	
1946	Devil and the Angel. French title: La Foire aux Chimeres.	Frank Davis: lonely, facially disfigured master-engraver for a bank who falls in love with a blind circus performer. Starring role.	Director: Pierre Chenal. Co-star: Madeleine Sologne. A much underrated work of French poetic realism. French production. Film noir. Extant.
1946	Danse de Mort	Edgar: a bitter, fallen prison warden in charge of a sunless, island fortress. Starring role. Extant.	Director: Marcel Cravenne. Co-starring: Denise Vernac, von Stroheim's wife. Some claim this role and Frank Davis in Devil and Angel are among von Stroheim's finest performances. Adapted from an August Strindberg play.
1949	The Red Signal	Le docteur Mathias Berthold: a widower whose wife was killed in a train accident sleep walks and sabotages train tracks until he is cured by Viennese psychiatrists. Starring role.	Director: Ernst Neubach. Co-starring von Stroheim's wife Denise Vernac.
1949	Portrait of an Assassin	Eric: former circus acrobat/trick motorcycle rider forced to retire due to severe work-related injuries. Starring role.	Director: Bernard Roland. Co-starring: Maria Montez and Arletty. Von Stroheim's role was originally written for Orson Welles who was sued for not performing in this film. French production. Film noir. Extant.
1950	Sunset Boulevard	Max von Mayerling: ex-Hollywood silent film director now working as a butler for his ex-wife and ex-silent film star Norma Desmond. Featured role.	Director: Billy Wilder. Screenplay: Wilder and Charles Brackett. Co-starring: William Holden and Gloria Swanson. Film nominated for many Academy Awards. Von Stroheim nominated for Academy Award for Best Supporting Actor. Set in Hollywood, California. Often on top-ten lists of greatest noirs or greatest films. U.S. production. Film noir. Extant.
1952	Alraune	Professor Jacob ten Brinken: experimental genetic scientist who creates the "perfect" yet soulless woman through artificial insemination. Starring role.	Director: Arthur Maria Rabenalt. Co-star: Hildegard Knef. Based on novel of the same name by Hanns Heinz Ewers and Henrik Galeen's 1928 silent film of the same title starring Brigitte Helm. Galeen's film is known by other titles including Mandrake, Unholy Love, and Daughter of Destiny. West German production. Horror. Extant.
1953	Midnight . . . Quai de Bercy a.k.a. Minuit . . . Quai de Bercy	Professeur Kieffer: a religious fanatic who distributes pamphlets to strip-club patrons. Cameo.	Director: Christian Stengel. A whodunit. A Parisian landlady is murdered and there are many suspects.
1953	The Other Side of Paradise a.k.a. L'envers du Paradis	William O'Hara: an eccentric sea captain living in a southern French village. Cameo.	Director: Edmond T. Greville. Score: Paul Mistaki. Set in Segnac, Provence. Black and white. French production. Drama. Extant.
1953	Alarm in Morocco a.k.a. Alerte au Sud	Conrad Nagel. Co-starring role (?).	Director: Jean-Devaivre. Set in French Morocco. Two members of the Foreign Legion uncover a nuclear weapon test site. Von Stroheim's first color film. French-Italian production. Adventure film. Extant.
1955	The Infiltrator. Original French title: Serie noire	Sacha Zavaroff: a Russian mob boss. Cameo.	Director: Pierre Foucaud. Corsican gangsters.
1955	Napoléon	Ludwig van Beethoven. Cameo.	Director/co-star: Sacha Guitry. Both von Stroheim and Orson Welles have minor, featured roles in the film. Color. Franco-Italian production. Historical epic. Extant.
1955	Madonna of the Sleeping Cars a.k.a. La madone des sleepings	Doctor Siegfried Traurig: a German psychiatrist on the Orient Express. Featured role.	Director: Henri Diamant-Berger. Adaptation from 1925 novel of same title by Maurice Dekobra and 1928 silent film, also with the same title. Co-starring: Jean Gaven. Von Stroheim's final film. Black and white. French production. Spy thriller comedy. Extant. (final film role)

=== As contributor ===
Year	Title	Role	Notes
1916	Macbeth	Minor role	Assistant director: von Stroheim.
1916	The Social Secretary	The Buzzard: a nosy NYC newspaper reporter (featured role)	Director: John Emerson. Uncredited assistant director: von Stroheim. Producer: D. W. Griffith. Screenplay: John Emerson and Anita Loos. Starring: Norma Talmadge. Set in NYC. American production. Romantic comedy. Extant.
1917	Sylvia of the Secret Service	Minor Role	Also assistant director
1923	Merry-Go-Round		Co-screenwriter and original director: von Stroheim. Set in pre-World War I Vienna. A disguised nobleman falls in love with a circus puppeteer's daughter. Extant.
1928	Tempest		Director: Sam Taylor. Co-writer: von Stroheim. Starring John Barrymore as a peasant Russian army officer who falls in love with a Russian princess in Czarist Russia. Von Stroheim was supposed to star in and direct this film but was taken off the project and replaced by Sam Taylor. Drama. Extant.
1933	Hello, Sister!		Original director: von Stroheim. Extant.
1936	The Devil-Doll		Director: Tod Browning. Co-screenplay adaptation: von Stroheim. Adapted from Abraham Merritt's 1932 novel Burn Witch Burn!. Score: Franz Waxman. Set in Paris and French penal colony of Cayenne in French Guiana, known as Ile du Diable or Devil's Island. Co-starring Maureen O'Sullivan and Lionel Barrymore. Wrongly accused banker escapes prison and returns to Paris to wreak revenge through shrunken humans. This wias Browning's second-to-last film. Horror. Extant.
1937	Between Two Women		Original Story: Erich von Stroheim Director: George B. Seitz. Film's theme of a female burn victim echoes the actual experience in 1933 of von Stroheim's wife Valerie who was burned in a Hollywood (shop located on Sunset Boulevard) beauty parlor explosion. Extant.

== Quotes ==
"Lubitsch shows you first the king on the throne, then as he is in the bedroom. I show you the king in the bedroom so you'll know just what he is when you see him on his throne."

"If you live in France, for instance, and you have written one good book, or painted one good picture, or directed one outstanding film 50 years ago and nothing else since, you are still recognized and honored accordingly. People take their hats off to you and call you 'maître'. They do not forget. In Hollywood—in Hollywood, you're as good as your last picture. If you didn't have one in production within the last three months, you're forgotten, no matter what you have achieved ere this."

== See also ==
- List of German-speaking Academy Award winners and nominees
