= The Soul of a Monster =

1944 American horror film by Will Jason

- Directed by: Will Jason
- Screenplay by: Edward Dein
- Produced by: Ted Richmond
- Starring: Rose Hobart; George Macready; Jim Bannon; Jeanne Bates; Erik Rolf
- Cinematography: Burnett Guffey
- Edited by: Paul Borofsky
- Music by: Mischa Bakaleinikoff
- Production company: Columbia Pictures
- Distributed by: Columbia Pictures
- Release date: 17 August 1944
- Running time: 61 minutes
- Country: United States
- Language: English

The Soul of a Monster is a 1944 American horror film directed by Will Jason and starring Rose Hobart, George Macready, Jim Bannon, Jeanne Bates and Erik Rolf. The film involves the near-death of George Winson, leading to Anne Winson to call upon the devil to keep her husband alive, which leads to a hypnotist named Lilyan Gregg making an appearance as Winson recovers. Upon his recovery, the previously kind-hearted Winson turns evil, following Gregg's spell. But Ann and her friends are not susceptible to Lilyan's mesmerizing prowess, enabling them to launch a counteroffensive against the Dark Prince.

== Plot ==
As the physician Dr. George Winson lies dying, his wife Ann fails to get help from Dr. Roger Vance or their pastor Fred Stevens and prays to any source that she thinks could help. This leads to the arrival of a strange woman, Lilyan Gregg, who starts caring for George. He miraculously recovers, but becomes cold, cruel, and this estranges him from Ann. Gregg begins to manipulate George for her needs, including having him murder Stevens.

Meeting with Vance, he finds that George has no pulse and after an operation, he accidentally cuts George and finds he has no blood. Vance then confronts Winson but is later run down by Gregg. In critical condition, Vance calls George to his side as Gregg tells him to let Vance die. Later, Stevens approaches George to tell him to break the hold Gregg has on him. George confronts Gregg, which leads to her deciding to murder him and make it look like a suicide. Gregg shoots George as he continues to advance towards her, finally pushing her through a window to her death. George's entire experience turns out to be a dream, as he awakens to find Ann praying for his recovery.

== Cast ==
- Rose Hobart as Lilyan Gregg
- George Macready as Dr. George Winson
- Jim Bannon as Dr. Roger Vance
- Jeanne Bates as Ann Winson
- Erik Rolf as Fred Stevens
- Ernest Hilliard as Wayne
- Norman Salling as Newsboy (uncredited)
- Ray Teal as Truck Driver (uncredited)

== Production ==
The Soul of a Monster was developed under the title Death Walks Alone. It was in production between May 25, 1944, and June 13, 1944.

== Release ==
The Soul of a Monster was released on August 17, 1944, by Columbia Pictures Corp.

== Reception ==
From contemporary reviews, The New York Times declared that the film was "an entry for the all-time looney prize! A preposterously foolish film."

From retrospective reviews, Gen Blottner, the author of Columbia Noir, praised Burnett Guffey's "brilliant photography" but stated that Edward Dein's screenplay "causes the film to come up empty" and that "The copout-ending reduces a fairly entertaining horror-noir to a bunch of hooey."
