= Jeanne Bates =

American actress (1918–2007)

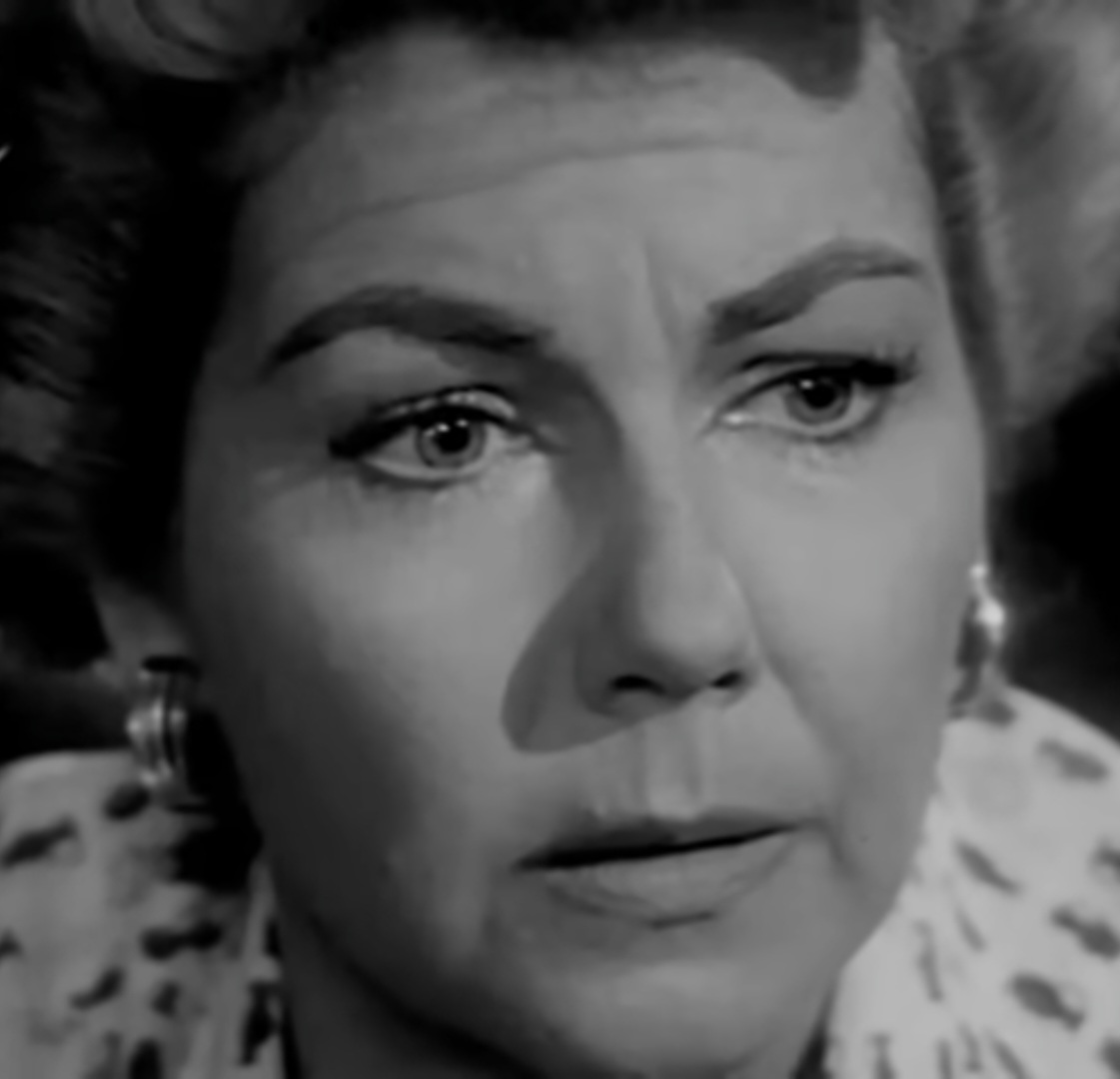
- Bates in an episode of One Step Beyond (1960)
- Born: May 21, 1918; Berkeley, California, U.S.
- Died: November 28, 2007 (aged 89); Los Angeles, California, U.S.
- Resting place: Forest Lawn Memorial Park, Hollywood Hills, California
- Education: San Mateo Junior College
- Occupation: Actress
- Years active: 1943–2002
- Known for: The Return of the Vampire; The Phantom; Death of a Salesman; Mulholland Drive; Eraserhead
- Spouse: Lew X. Lansworth (m. 1943; died 1981)

Jeanne Bates (May 21, 1918 – November 28, 2007) was an American radio, film and television actress. After performing in radio serials, she signed a contract with Columbia Pictures in 1942 which began her career in films both in small parts and larger roles in a series of horror films and noirs, including The Return of the Vampire (1943) and Shadows in the Night (1946).

In her later career, Bates would collaborate with David Lynch on his films Eraserhead (1977) and Mulholland Drive (2001), the latter of which was her last film credit before her death in 2007.

== Career ==
Bates was born in Berkeley, California in 1918. She began her acting career while attending San Mateo Junior College, with roles on radio soap operas produced in San Francisco. Bates had the lead role, and supplied the signature scream, on the radio mystery series Whodunit. Following the war, the show was revived under the name "Murder Will Out." In 1943, she married the writer of Whodunit, Lew X. Lansworth (1904–1981). Bates also appeared in radio's "Gunsmoke", including the 12/13/1952 episode "Post Martin" and the 10/23/1960 episode "Newsma'am".

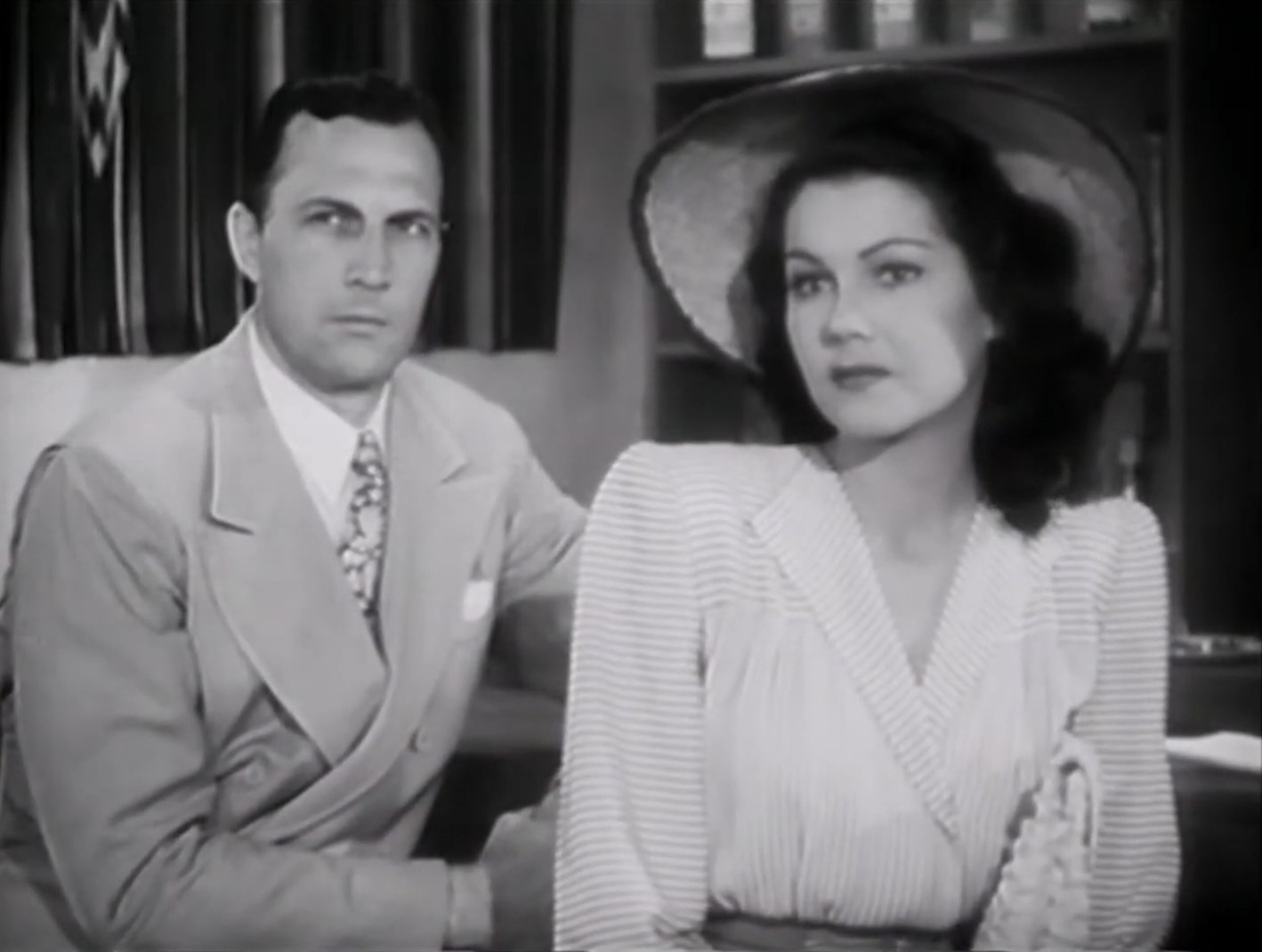
Tom Tyler and Jeanne Bates in The Phantom (1943)

She also had her film debut in 1943, in a Boston Blackie mystery, The Chance of a Lifetime. She played Bela Lugosi's first victim in The Return of the Vampire (1943), Anne Winson in The Soul of a Monster (1944), Victoria in The Mask of Diijon (1946), Diana Palmer in The Phantom serial (1943), Agnes in Back from the Dead (film) (1957), and she also had a minor role in Death of a Salesman (1951).

Bates worked steadily in television beginning in the 1950s, including an appearance on the syndicated western series The Range Rider, and thereafter on episodes of NBC's Buckskin, Riverboat, and Peter Gunn, as well as the crime drama The Sheriff of Cochise, and the aviation adventure series Sky King and Whirlybirds. She also appeared in a 1956 episode of The Lone Ranger entitled "The Cross of Santo Domingo".

In the series premiere, "The Ferris Wheel" (September 23, 1958), of the syndicated television series, Rescue 8, starring Jim Davis and Lang Jeffries, Bates played a woman recently released from a mental institution who is trapped at the top of a Ferris wheel with her young daughter, portrayed by Gina Gillespie. Rand Brooks guest stars in the episode as Tom Hickey. That year she made three appearances on Perry Mason, most notably as Jean Strague in "The Case of the Buried Clock".

In 1960, she was cast as Mrs. Grandsoir in the episode "Mrs. Viner Vanishes" of the ABC/Warner Brothers crime drama Bourbon Street Beat, starring Andrew Duggan. She is more remembered for having portrayed Nurse Wills on the ABC medical drama Ben Casey, from 1961 to 1966. She appeared with John Payne in various roles in five episodes of his NBC western series The Restless Gun, and also guest starred as Mrs. Wayne in the Rawhide episode "Incident of the Tinkers Dam".

Bates, who also taught acting, also appeared in films such as The Strangler (1964), Suppose They Gave a War and Nobody Came (1970), and David Lynch's Eraserhead (1977) as Mrs. X. In July 1982, she appeared on Broadway as Mrs. Bixby in a production of Seven Brides for Seven Brothers. Her last roles were small parts in Die Hard 2 (1990), Grand Canyon (1991), Dream Lover (1994) and Mulholland Drive (2001). She also played the title role of a flesh-eating ghoul in Mom (1991), opposite Brion James, Mark Thomas Miller, and Stella Stevens.

== Personal life ==
Bates married Lew X. Lansworth in 1943 and was married to him until his death in 1981.

== Death ==
In 2007, Bates died of breast cancer at the Motion Picture & Television Country House and Hospital in Woodland Hills, Los Angeles, California at age 89. Her remains are interred at Forest Lawn Memorial Park, Hollywood Hills, California.

== Filmography ==
Year	Title	Role	Notes
1943	The Chance of a Lifetime	Mary Watson	
1943	The Return of the Vampire	Miss Norcutt	Uncredited
1943	There's Something About a Soldier	Phyllis	Uncredited
1943	The Phantom	Diana Palmer	Film serial
1944	The Racket Man	Phyllis Lake	
1944	Sundown Valley	Sidney Hawkins	
1944	Hey, Rookie	Chief W.A.C.	Uncredited
1944	The Black Parachute	Olga	
1944	She's a Soldier Too	"Red" Burns	Uncredited
1944	Shadows in the Night	Adele Carter	
1944	The Soul of a Monster	Anne Winson	Also known as Death Walks Alone
1944	It's Murder	Mrs. Tom Blair	Short film
1944	Sergeant Mike	Terry Arno	
1945	Tonight and Every Night	W.A.C. Woman	Uncredited
1946	The Mask of Diijon	Victoria	
1951	The Living Christ Series	Mary, Sister of Lazarus	Miniseries
1951	Dangerous Assignment	Eva Schaeffer	Season 1, Episode 4: "The Memory Chain"
1951	Trouble In-Laws	Mrs. Herbert	Short film
1951	Death of a Salesman	Mother	Uncredited
1952	Paula	Attending Nurse	Uncredited
1954	Sabaka	Durga	
1955	Gunsmoke	Mrs. Nolan	Smoking Out The Nolan's
1955	Gunsmoke	Mrs. Wyatt	Night Incident
1956	Tension at Table Rock	Mrs. Brice	Uncredited
1957	Trooper Hook	Ann Weaver	
1957	Back from the Dead	Agnes	
1958	The Restless Gun	Mrs. Hoffman	Episodes "Strange Family in Town", "Gratitude", "No Way to Kill"
1958	Blood Arrow	Almee	
1959	The Restless Gun		Episode "Better Than a Cannon"
1959	Hi, Grandma!		Television film
1959	Have Gun Will Travel	Harriet Morrow	Episode "The Taffeta Mayor"
1960	Vice Raid	Marilyn	Uncredited
1961	The Twilight Zone	Ethel Hollis	It's a Good Life - Season 3 Episode 8
1964	The Strangler	Clara Thomas	
1969	Mayberry RFD	Jennie Mae	S2 Episode 13 Palm Springs Cowboy
1969	Mannix	Melinda Webber	S2-Episode 10 "Night Out Of Time"
1970	Suppose They Gave a War and Nobody Came	Mrs. Flanders	
1976	Gus	Nurse	
1977	Eraserhead	Mrs. X	
1977	Poco... Little Dog Lost	Mrs. John Ashmore	
1986	Touch and Go	Woman at the Morgue	
1989	From the Dead of Night	Nurse	Television film
1990	Die Hard 2	Older Woman (Northeast Plane)	
1990	Mom	Emily Dwyer	
1990	Silent Night, Deadly Night 4: Initiation	Katherine	
1991	Wild Orchid II: Two Shades of Blue	Mrs. Felt	
1991	Grand Canyon	Mrs. Menken	
1994	Dream Lover	Jeanne	
2001	Mulholland Drive	Irene	

== Television ==
Year	Title	Role	Notes
1959	Rawhide	Mrs Wayne	S2:E16, "Incident of the Tinker's Dam"
1983	General Hospital	Mrs. Dodd and Stella Fields	1983 and temp 1987
