= The Mask of Diijon =

1946 film by Lew Landers

- Theatrical release poster
- Directed by: Lew Landers
- Screenplay by: Griffin Jay; Arthur St. Claire
- Story by: Arthur St. Claire
- Produced by: Max Alexander; Alfred Stern
- Starring: Erich von Stroheim; Jeanne Bates; William Wright
- Cinematography: Jack Greenhalgh
- Edited by: Roy V. Livingston
- Music by: Karl Hajos
- Production company: Producers Releasing Corporation
- Distributed by: Producers Releasing Corporation
- Release date: March 7, 1946 (United States)
- Running time: 73 minutes
- Country: United States
- Language: English

The Mask of Diijon is a 1946 American black-and-white horror noir suspense film released from PRC Studios, directed by Lew Landers and featuring Erich von Stroheim, Jeanne Bates and William Wright.

== Plot ==
Diijon, a tired magician, gives up his act to study the power of the mind. His wife Victoria, once supportive, now is struggling to pay bills. She urges her stubborn and older husband to return to the magic field where Diijon was considered one of the greats. He refuses but does reluctantly agree to do a hypnotism nightclub act at Victoria's urging. The act goes bad and he's laughed off the stage. He's convinced this is the handiwork of Victoria's ex-lover Tony Holliday. Later, Diijon finds that he does indeed have the power to control men's minds and begins to take revenge on the people he felt made him look like a fool. He hypnotizes his young wife to kill the man. Unfortunately for Diijon, things go horribly wrong.

The opening of the film features a memorable scene depicting a woman being beheaded, with a guillotine—then revealed to be a magic trick.

== Cast ==
- Erich von Stroheim as Diijon
- Jeanne Bates as Victoria
- William Wright as Tony Holiday
- Denise Vernac as Denise
- Edward Van Sloan as Sheffield
- Hope Landin as Mrs. McGaffey
- Mauritz Hugo as Danton

== Reception ==
TV Guide rated it 1/4 stars and wrote, "Except for von Stroheim, the acting was barely adequate." Writing in Horror Noir, author Paul Meehan said the film "manages to transcend its humble origins primarily through the star power of von Stroheim".
