= The Trump Card (film) =

1942 French crime film

- Directed by: Jacques Becker
- Written by: Louis Chavance; Maurice Aubergé; Pierre Bost
- Produced by: André Halley des Fontaines
- Starring: Mireille Balin; Raymond Rouleau; Pierre Renoir
- Cinematography: Nicolas Hayer
- Edited by: Marguerite Renoir
- Music by: Jean Alfaro
- Production company: L'Essor Cinématographique Français
- Distributed by: Pathé Consortium Cinéma
- Release date: 2 September 1942
- Running time: 105 minutes
- Country: France
- Language: French

The Trump Card (French: Dernier atout) is a 1942 French crime film directed by Jacques Becker and starring Mireille Balin, Raymond Rouleau and Pierre Renoir.

The film marked Becker's full debut as a director, although he had briefly worked on Cristobal's Gold in 1940. It was filmed partly on the French Riviera, which stood in for South America. Interiors were filmed at the Victorine Studios and at Pathé's studio in Paris. The film's sets were designed by the art director Max Douy. During production Becker used the pretext of filming to liaise between French Resistance groups in Paris and the South.

== Synopsis ==
In a Latin American country, two young policeman finish joint top of their graduating detective class. To separate them, they take on an investigation at a luxury hotel to see who is the better detective. The case proves however, to have been the murder of a notorious American gangster, killed by his former associates from Chicago.

== Cast ==
- Mireille Balin as Bella Score
- Raymond Rouleau as Clarence
- Pierre Renoir as Rudy Score
- Noël Roquevert as L'inspecteur Gonzalès
- Catherine Cayret as Pearl
- Gaston Modot as Toni Amanito
- Roger Blin as Un aspirant
- Jean Didier as Le chef des aspirants
- Eddy Debray as Le bijoutier
- Pierre Perret
- Christian Argentin as Le gérant de l'hôtel
- René Stern as Roberto
- Henry Darbray as Un inspecteur
- Maxime Fabert as Le bijoutier soupçonneux
- François Joux as Le chauffeur
- Guy Denancy as Un aspirant
- Georges Simmler
- Pierre Dargout
- Guy Decomble as Un aspirant
- Jacques Meyran as Le barman du Babylonia
- Clément Duhour as Setton
- Maurice Baquet a Mickey
- Jean Debucourt as Thomas
- Georges Rollin as Montès

== Bibliography ==
- C.G. Crisp The Classic French Cinema, 1930-1960. Indiana University Press, 1993.
- Ann Lloyd & David Robinson. The Illustrated history of the cinema. Macmillan, 1987.
