= The Chance of a Lifetime (1943 film) =

1943 film by William Castle

- Film poster
- Directed by: William Castle
- Written by: Jack Boyle; Paul Yawitz
- Produced by: Wallace MacDonald
- Starring: Chester Morris; Erik Rolf; Jeanne Bates
- Cinematography: Ernest Miller
- Edited by: Jerome Thoms
- Music by: M. W. Stoloff
- Distributed by: Columbia Pictures
- Release date: October 26, 1943
- Running time: 65 min.
- Country: United States
- Language: English

The Chance of a Lifetime is a 1943 crime drama starring Chester Morris, Erik Rolf and Jeanne Bates. It is one of 14 films made by Columbia Pictures involving detective Boston Blackie, a criminal-turned-crime solver. This was the sixth in the series and one of three that did not have his name in the title. The film is also William Castle's directorial debut. As with many of the films of the period, this was a flag waver to support America's efforts during World War II.

The film is under copyright until 2039 due to renewal.

== Plot ==
Boston Blackie helps get prisoners with needed skills released on parole to help in the machine and tool plant of his friend, Arthur Manleder. Those chosen want to support America's war effort. All of the parolees have to stay in Blackie's apartment, all except robber Dooley Watson. Blackie allows him to see his wife and son.

Watson goes after the payroll money he stole before he was captured. His wife Mary convinces him to give it back, but his partners in crime, "Red" Taggart and "Nails" Blanton, have been waiting patiently for their share. When they threaten Dooley's family, Dooley fights back. Red is killed in the ensuing struggle. Nails runs off. If Boston Blackie is to save his project, he has to capture Nails and force him to confess the death was in self-defense, all while dodging Inspector Farraday.

== Cast ==
- Chester Morris as Boston Blackie
- Erik Rolf as Dooley Watson
- Jeanne Bates as Mary Watson
- Richard Lane as Inspector John Farraday
- George E. Stone as The Runt
- Lloyd Corrigan as Arthur Manleder

Uncredited:

- Arthur Hunnicutt as Elwood "Tex" Stewart
- Pierre Watkin as Gov. Rutledge
- Douglas Fowley as "Nails" Blanton
- Sid Melton as "Sunny" Hines
- Walter Sande as Detective Sgt. Mathews
- Harry Semels as Jerome "Egypt" Hines
- Ray Teal as Joe, a cop
- Marie De Becker as Miss Bailey
- Minta Durfee

== Production ==
William Castle wanted to direct. Harry Cohn gave him the chance with this film. Castle said it was a "lousy, dull, contrived, miserable script; the characters wooden and the dialogue unbelievably bad. My first picture and I had a turkey!"

He tried to arrange for the script to be rewritten but Irving Briskin refused and Castle was too scared to ask Cohn for a rewrite. The film was shot in twelve days. Castle says Chester Morris "tried to breathe some life into a part that died at birth" and Bates "hopelessly tried to play the femme fetale".

Castle said Briskin disliked the film and rearranged its structure with extensive cutting making it, in Castle's words, "even more muddled and screwed up than it had been originally."

== Reception ==
Reviews of the film were terrible but Castle says Cohn backed him and gave him another movie to direct, The Whistler, which was a success.

== Bibliography ==
- Castle, William (1976). Step right up!: ... I'm gonna scare the pants off America. Putnam.
