= The Other Side of Paradise (film) =

1953 film

- Directed by: Edmond T. Gréville
- Written by: Edmond T. Gréville
- Produced by: Léon Gouble
- Starring: Erich von Stroheim; Jacques Sernas; Denise Vernac
- Cinematography: Léonce-Henri Burel; Jacques Lemare
- Edited by: Georges Arnstam
- Music by: Joé Hajos
- Production company: Pacifico
- Distributed by: Columbia Pictures
- Release date: 19 July 1953
- Running time: 96 minutes
- Country: France
- Language: French

The Other Side of Paradise (French: L'envers du paradis) is a 1953 French drama film directed by Edmond T. Gréville and starring Erich von Stroheim, Jacques Sernas and Denise Vernac. Much of the film was shot on location in Provence. The film's sets were designed by the art director Jean Douarinou.

== Cast ==
- Erich von Stroheim as William O'Hara
- Jacques Sernas as Blaise d'Orliac
- Denise Vernac as Claudine de Vervins
- Jacques Castelot as Gabriel Dautrand
- Dany Caron as Louisette
- Dora Doll as Michèle
- Dina Sassoli as Pepita
- Edouard Hemme as Le curé
- Pierre Lorsay as M. Romégoux
- Edmond Ardisson as Célestin
- Héléna Manson as Mme Roumégoux
- Etchika Choureau as Violaine Roumégoux

== Bibliography ==
- Lennig, Arthur. Stroheim. University Press of Kentucky, 2004.
