= The Red Signal (film) =

1949 film

- Directed by: Ernst Neubach
- Written by: André Cerf; Ernst Neubach; Herbert Victor
- Based on: The Red Signal by Adolf Schütz and Paul Baudisch
- Produced by: Ernst Neubach
- Starring: Erich von Stroheim; Denise Vernac; Frank Villard
- Cinematography: Raymond Clunie
- Edited by: Louis Devaivre; Marcelle Lioret
- Music by: Curt Lewinnek
- Production company: Pen Films
- Distributed by: Les Films Georges Muller
- Release date: 4 February 1949
- Running time: 98 minutes
- Country: France
- Language: French

The Red Signal (French: Le signal rouge) is a 1949 French drama film directed by Ernst Neubach and starring Erich von Stroheim, Denise Vernac and Frank Villard. It is based on a novel of the same title by Adolf Schütz and Paul Baudisch. It was shot at the Victorine Studios in Nice. The film's sets were designed by the art director Louis Le Barbenchon.

== Synopsis ==
In a small Austrian town, physician Mathias Berthold is haunted by the memory of his wife who died in a train accident. Under psychological strain he hears his wife's voice commanding him to "stop the train". In a trance-like state he attempts to sabotage the railway tracks, and is shot and wounded by the police. Realising his torment, he goes for treatment in a specialist clinic in Vienna. Doctor Irène Dreiser, who is sympathetic to Berthold, takes over his patients during his absence.

== Cast ==
- Erich von Stroheim, as Le docteur Mathias Berthold
- Denise Vernac, as Dr. Irène Dreiser
- Frank Villard, as Ing. Nicolas Riedel
- Yves Deniaud, as Le clochard Emil
- Pierre Sergeol, as Le commissaire
- Claude Chenard, as Poldi Paladi, chanteuse
- Roland Clair, as Peter
- Marcel Maupi, as Le contremaître
- Jules Dorpe, as Le chef de gare
- Jean Gabert, as Le gendarme
- Claire Gérard, as Marie
- Jean-François Martial, as Le contrôleur

== Bibliography ==
- Bessy, Maurice & Chirat, Raymond. Histoire du cinéma français: encyclopédie des films, 1940–1950. Pygmalion, 1986
- Rège, Philippe. Encyclopedia of French Film Directors, Volume 1. Scarecrow Press, 2009.
