= Immediate Call =

1939 film

- Directed by: Léon Mathot
- Written by: Leon Askin; André-Paul Antoine
- Produced by: Herman Millakowsky
- Starring: Mireille Balin; Roger Duchesne; Bernard Lancret
- Cinematography: Maurice Fleury; Christian Gaveau; Nicolas Hayer; Pierre Méré
- Edited by: Marguerite Beaugé
- Music by: Michel Michelet
- Production company: Les Productions Milo Film
- Distributed by: Compagnie Française Cinématographique
- Release date: 15 June 1939
- Running time: 90 minutes
- Country: France
- Language: French

Immediate Call (French: Rappel immédiat), is a 1939 French comedy drama film, directed by Léon Mathot and starring Mireille Balin, Roger Duchesne, Erich von Stroheim, and Bernard Lancret. The plot is about a hosted peace conference, that results in saving the world.

== Cast ==
- Mireille Balin as Helen Wells
- Roger Duchesne as Pierre Deschamps
- Bernard Lancret as Gilbert Sellier
- Erich von Stroheim as Captain Stanley Wells
- Guillaume de Sax as Le metteur en scène
- Raymond Aimos as L'électricien
- Mady Berry as La femme du réserviste
- Claire Gérard as L'habilleuse
- Marcel Delaître as Le réserviste
- Georges Bever as Le masseur Paul
- Lucien Dalsace as L'officier
- Jacques Tarride as Le secrétaire
- Georges Paulais as Un agent
- Pierre D'Ennery
- Henri de Livry
- Marie-José
- Frédéric Mariotti
- Noëlle Norman
- Marie-Claire Pissaro
- Martial Rèbe
- Eugène Stuber
- Denise Vernac
- Yvonne Yma
