= Denise Vernac =

French actress (1916–1984)

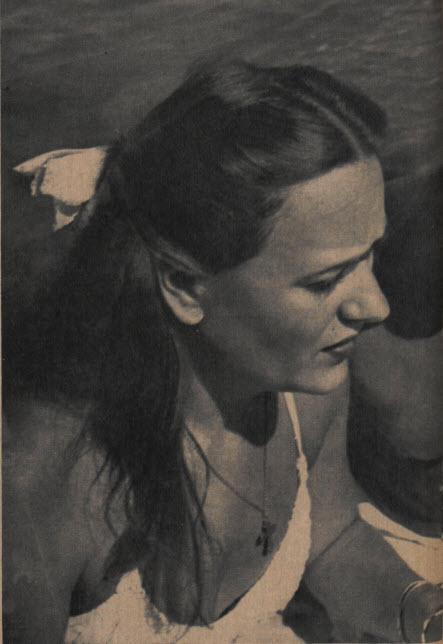
- in Regards magazine, 1946
- Born: Denise Yvonne Eveillard; 3 June 1916; Les Pavillons-sous-Bois, France
- Died: 31 October 1984 (aged 68); Paris, France
- Occupation: Actress
- Years active: 1939–1966
- Partner: Erich von Stroheim (1939–1957)
- Children: Josef von Stroheim

Denise Vernac (née Denise Yvonne Eveillard; 3 June 1916 – 31 October 1984) was a French film actress. She appeared in seventeen films, between 1939 and 1966.

Additionally, Vernac was the secretary and romantic companion of Erich von Stroheim, an Austrian-American actor, film director and producer, and screenwriter.

She died at age 68 and is buried in the cemetery in Maurepas, Yvelines.

== Filmography ==
- Immediate Call (1939)
- Love Cavalcade (1940)
- Paris-New York (1940)
- The Mask of Diijon (1946)
- That's Not the Way to Die (1946)
- The Dance of Death (1948)
- The Red Signal (1949)
- Mandragore (1952)
- Alraune (1952), as Mademoiselle Duvaliere
- The Other Side of Paradise (1953)
- Madonna of the Sleeping Cars (1955)
- Black Sun (1966)
