= That's Not the Way to Die =

1946 film

- Directed by: Jean Boyer
- Written by: Ernst Neubach; André Tabet
- Based on: The Death Kiss plot from 1933 film by Edwin L. Marin
- Produced by: Ernst Neubach; Robert Tarcali
- Starring: Erich von Stroheim; Anne-Marie Blanc; Denise Vernac
- Cinematography: Walter Wottitz
- Edited by: Yvonne Martin
- Music by: Joe Hajos
- Production company: Astra Paris Films
- Distributed by: Astra Paris Films
- Release date: 3 July 1946
- Running time: 95 minutes
- Country: France
- Language: French

That's Not the Way to Die (French: On ne meurt pas comme ça) is a 1946 French mystery crime film directed by Jean Boyer and starring Erich von Stroheim, Anne-Marie Blanc and Denise Vernac. The film's sets were designed by the art director Aimé Bazin. It borrows its main plot device from the 1932 American film The Death Kiss. von Stroheim was not happy with the film, but felt it received good reviews and was popular with audiences.

== Synopsis ==
At a film studios while shooting a scene in which a man is killed, director Eric von Berg angrily calls cuts and rebukes the actor and shouts "That's Not the Way to Die". However, the actor soon turns out to be really dead, murdered by somebody present.

== Cast ==
- Erich von Stroheim, as Eric von Berg
- Anne-Marie Blanc, as Marianne
- Denise Vernac, as Lynn Laurens
- Jean Témerson, as Le commissaire
- André Tabet, as Cazenave
- Jean-Jacques Delbo, as Pierre Vanier
- Jean Berton, as Le régisseur
- Sylvie, as Suzanne Bouvier
- Sinoël, as Marcel
- René Havard, as L'assistant
- Georges Lannes, as Le docteur Jacques Forestier
- Jacqueline Pierreux, as La figurante
- Marcel Vallée, as Le producteur
