= The Dance of Death (1948 film) =

- Directed by: Marcel Cravenne
- Written by: Michel Arnaud; Jacques-Laurent Bost; Marcel Cravenne; August Strindberg (play); Erich von Stroheim
- Starring: Erich von Stroheim; Denise Vernac; Palau
- Cinematography: Robert Lefebvre
- Edited by: Madeleine Bagiau
- Music by: Guy Bernard
- Production companies: Alcina; Ardea Film
- Distributed by: Atlantis Film; Gaumont
- Release date: 8 December 1948
- Running time: 88 minutes
- Countries: France; Italy
- Language: French

The Dance of Death (French: La danse de mort, Italian: La prigioniera dell'isola), is a 1948 French-Italian drama film directed by Marcel Cravenne and starring Erich von Stroheim, Denise Vernac and Palau. It is based on August Strindberg's The Dance of Death. It was shot at the Titanus Studios in Rome and the Icet Studios in Milan. The film's sets were designed by Georges Wakhévitch.

== Plot ==
An egocentric artillery Captain and his venomous wife engage in relentless battles in their isolated island fortress off the coast of Sweden at the turn of the century. Alice, a former actress who sacrificed her career for a military life with Edgar, reveals on their 25th wedding anniversary that their marriage has been hellish. Edgar, an aging schizophrenic who denies his severe illness, struggles to maintain his ferocity and arrogance, showing disregarding others. Sensing that Alice, together with her cousin and would-be lover, Kurt, may ally against him, retaliates with vicious force. Alice lures Kurt into the illusion of sharing a passionate assignation and recruits him in a plot to destroy Edgar.

== Cast ==
- Erich von Stroheim, as Edgar
- Denise Vernac, as Théa
- María Denis, as Rita
- Palau as Le sergent / Il sergente
- Massimo Serato as Stéphane / Stefano
- Paul Oettly as Le général / Il generale
- Marie Olivier
- Henri Pons as Le timonier / Il timoniere
- Roberto Villa
- Galeazzo Benti
- Margo Lion as Mathilde - la servante
- Jean Servais as Kurt
- Roberto Bertea
