= Pépé le Moko =

1937 film

- Theatrical release poster
- Directed by: Julien Duvivier
- Screenplay by: Julien Duvivier; Henri La Barthe; Jacques Constant (adaptation); Henri Jeanson (dialogue)
- Based on: Pépé le Moko; 1937 novel by Henri La Barthe
- Produced by: Raymond Hakim; Robert Hakim
- Starring: Jean Gabin
- Cinematography: Marc Fossard; Jules Kruger
- Edited by: Marguerite Beaugé
- Music by: Vincent Scotto; Mohamed Ygerbuchen
- Distributed by: Arthur Mayer and Joseph Burstyn (USA, 1941); The Criterion Collection (Region 1 DVD, 2004)
- Release dates: 28 January 1937 (France); 3 March 1941 (US)
- Running time: 94 minutes
- Country: France
- Language: French

Pépé le Moko ([pe.pe lə mo.ko]) is a 1937 French film directed by Julien Duvivier starring Jean Gabin, based on a novel of the same name by Henri La Barthe and with sets by Jacques Krauss. An example of the 1930s French movement known as poetic realism, it recounts the trapping of a gangster on the run in Algiers, who believes that he is safe from arrest in the Casbah.

== Plot ==
Pépé le Moko, a famous thief, has hidden in the complex Casbah for nearly two years. Despite police efforts, he stays free thanks to local support and the area's maze-like streets. His life feels dull, but leaving risks capture. Inspector Slimane develops a teasing, unusual bond with Pépé, vowing to arrest him if he tries to escape.

One night, Pépé meets a glamorous Parisian visitor named Gaby, who is adorned with jewels, and falls for her. Meanwhile, Casbah resident Régis collaborates with the police, planning to use Pépé’s friend Pierrot as bait. Slimane, sensing Gaby’s attraction, brings her group to meet Pépé; her jewels fascinate his gang.

Tensions rise when Pierrot goes missing, leading Pépé to confront Régis. Pépé and Gaby reconnect in the Casbah and share a night together. When Pierrot, wounded, returns and tries to kill Régis but dies, the gang kills Régis, and Gaby leaves without saying goodbye. Pépé, overwhelmed with despair by the death of Pierrot, attempts to make his way into the main town but is kept in the Casbah by his mistress Inès, who lies about Gaby’s whereabouts in an effort to save Pépé from being recklessly arrested.

Later, Pépé finds Gaby, and they share a passionate moment, planning to meet again. Slimane warns her that her wealthy fiancé considers her visiting the Casbah dangerous, hoping Pépé will seek her out if she misses their meeting. Ignoring this, Gaby plans to meet Pépé, but Slimane falsely reports that Pépé is dead.

Pépé writes a letter to Gaby, giving it to Carlos to deliver. After waiting all night and not having heard from Carlos, another informer tells Pépé that Carlos was captured by the police. Pépé, suspecting he is lying, beats the truth out of the informer. Learning Gaby is leaving Algiers at the port; Pépé departs to find her and catch her ship.

Inès tells Slimane of Pépé’s plan. Pépé is arrested at the harbor. Watching Gaby leave, he asks Slimane for permission to see her off. As he sees her at the ship’s stern, he attempts to catch her attention by yelling her name. The sound of the horn covers his scream and Gaby, finding the sound of the horn unbearable, returns back inside, not noticing Pépé. Heartbroken, Pépé commits suicide with a knife. Inès rushes to him, saying "Forgive me" as the ship departs.

== Cast ==
- Jean Gabin as Pépé le Moko
- Gabriel Gabrio as Carlos
- Mireille Balin as Gaby Gould, the beautiful Parisienne
- Saturnin Fabre as Le Grand Père
- Line Noro as Inès
- Fernand Charpin as Régis
- Lucas Gridoux as Inspecteur Slimane
- Gilbert Gil as Pierrot
- Marcel Dalio as L'Arbi
- Charles Granval as Maxime
- Gaston Modot as Jimmy
- René Bergeron as Inspecteur Meunier
- Paul Escoffier as Chief Inspecteur Louvain
- Roger Legris as Max
- Jean Témerson as Gravèr
- Robert Ozanne as Gendron
- Philippe Richard as Janvier
- Georges Péclet as Barsac
- Fréhel as Tania
- Olga Lord as Aïcha
- Renée Carl as La mère Tarte

== Production ==
Principal photography for the film was shot at a replica of the Casbah at Joinville-le-Pont, near Paris, and only exterior shots were filmed in Algiers. Lead actress Mireille Balin never set foot in Algeria during the making of the film.

The set design that Jacques Krauss created for the film established the setting in the Casbah. With little to no location shooting, Krauss' work was central to the production of the film. At that time in French cinema, shooting on sets was preferred to location shooting because of the artistic control it gave to designers such as Krauss.

Duvivier utilized multiple methods of creating a sense of realism despite filming on a set. He introduced the setting of the Casbah with documentary style footage. This included longer establishing shots of the Casbah in its entirety along with shorter shots that showed the chaotic atmosphere. Also, Duvivier included longer shots when focusing on characters. This technique made scenes feel like they were happening in real time.

Another element of the production was the film noir style. Multiple shots include the shadow of venetian blinds or other pieces of Krauss' set design that obscure characters with shadows, which is a common effect used in the genre of film noir.

Dialogue was important to French filmmaking at the time Pépé le Moko was made because of the recent introduction of sound. The screenplay and dialogue were written separately for this film with Henri La Barthe, Julien Duvivier, and Jacques Constant credited for writing the screenplay, and Henri Jeanson for the dialogue.

Jean Gabin was a skilled singer and there are multiple moments in the film when he sings songs that are relevant to his character and the story. Fréhel, another skilled singer, also sings during the film as her character.

== Critical reception ==
Negative reviews of "Pépé le Moko" are fairly rare, with critics generally praising the film for its direction, performances, and themes. Most critics and scholars mark the film to be a crucial and noteworthy work of early French cinema. However, as with most works of art, there are differing opinions and interpretations, with some viewers and critics not responding to the film as positively as others.

Rotten Tomatoes reports an approval rating of 100% based on 31 reviews, with an average rating of 9.1/10. Metacritic reports a score of 98, based on 12 reviews, indicating "universal acclaim".

English author Graham Greene in a review of the film for The Spectator asserted: "One of the most exciting and moving films I can remember seeing". It succeeds in "raising the thriller to a poetic level". According to a BBC documentary, it served as inspiration for Greene's screenplay for The Third Man. It has many similarities with the American film Casablanca, which was released a few years later.

In a frenchfilms.org review, writer James Travers states that the 1937 film could be considered the "most evocative of the early American film noir". However, it has a very distinctive French atmosphere and nostalgia for Paris is an underlying theme of the film. Due to the arrival of the Second World War and the dark nature of the film, French authorities grew increasingly concerned over the "demoralizing influence" and eventually decided to bar citizens from viewing the film.

Though the American opening of the film had been delayed for roughly four years by Walter Wanger, producer of Algiers, (U.S. release date March 3, 1941 compared to the French release in 1937) due to his purchase of the rights to the film within America, the film was well-received as reported by the New York Times.

== Remakes ==
The film was remade in America in 1938 as Algiers, starring Hedy Lamarr and Charles Boyer, and again in 1948 as Casbah, a musical starring Tony Martin, Märta Torén, Yvonne de Carlo, and Peter Lorre. The title character's French accent and womanizing, as portrayed by Charles Boyer in the 1938 remake, inspired the name and comic premise of the Looney Tunes cartoon character, Pepé Le Pew, introduced in 1945.
