= Mireille Balin =

French actress (1909–1968)

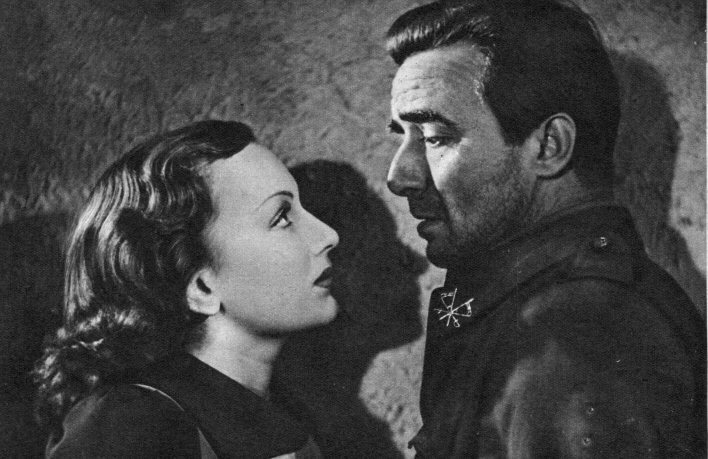
- Mireille Balin and Fosco Giachetti in The Siege of the Alcazar (1940)
- Born: Blanche Mireille Césarine Balin; 20 July 1909; Monte Carlo, Monaco
- Died: 9 November 1968 (aged 59); Clichy, Hauts-de-Seine, France
- Years active: 1932–1948

Mireille Césarine Balin (born Blanche Mireille Césarine Balin; 20 July 1909, in Monte Carlo – 9 November 1968 in Paris) was a French actress.

Balin was born near Monte Carlo. Her father, Charles Balin, was a French newspaper publisher. Her mother was Italian. Her education came at finishing schools. She was a policewoman in Paris until friends urged her to take a screen test.

Balin posed for some advertisements in Paris before she began acting in films. During the 1930s she became a major star of French cinema with box-office successes like Pépé le Moko (1936). She also attempted an American career, arriving in Hollywood in 1937 with a staff of servants and with 28 trunks containing "most of her worldly possessions. But she did not adapt to the studio system and eventually returned to France without having made any films in the United States.

During the Nazi occupation of France, Balin became romantically involved with an officer of the Wehrmacht. Following the liberation of France, she was gang raped by a mob and subsequently imprisoned in Fresnes until January 1945. She attempted a comeback in 1947 with La dernière chevauchée , but the film was not a success.

During the final 10 years of her life she lived in a "charitable home". Balin died in 1968, aged 59.

== Filmography ==
- Vive la classe (1932)
- Don Quichotte (1932)
- The Weaker Sex (1933)
- Goodbye, Beautiful Days (1933)
- On a trouvé une femme nue (1934)
- Vive la compagnie (1934)
- If I Were Boss (1934)
- Marie des angoisses (1935)
- Le roman d'un spahi (1936)
- Girls of Paris (1936)
- Pépé le Moko (1936)
- Lady Killer (1937)
- The Kiss of Fire (1937)
- Golden Venus (1938)
- Captain Benoît (1938)
- Terre de feu (1938)
- Coups de feu (1939)
- Terra di fuoco (1939)
- Cas de conscience (1939)
- Immediate Call (1939)
- The Siege of the Alcazar (1940)
- Threats (1940)
- Fromont jeune et Risler aîné (1941)
- The Murderer is Afraid at Night (1942)
- The Woman I Loved Most (1942)
- Haut le vent (1942)
- Macao (1942)
- The Trump Card (1942)
- L'assassin a peur la nuit (1942)
- Malaria (1943)
- La dernière chevauchée (1947)
