= Pierre Palau =

French actor

- Born: Pierre Palau del Vitri; 13 August 1883; Meudon, France
- Died: 3 December 1966 (aged 83); Hauts-de-Seine, France
- Occupation: Actor
- Years active: 1909–1966

Pierre Palau (13 August 1883 – 3 December 1966), often known simply as Palau, was a French actor.

Palau was born Pierre Palau del Vitri in Paris and died at age 83 in Meudon, Hauts-de-Seine, France.

== Partial filmography ==
- When Do You Commit Suicide? (1931)
- Luck (1931)
- Côte d'Azur (1932)
- Monsieur Albert (1932)
- Knock (1933)
- La dame de chez Maxim's (1933)
- Zouzou (1934)
- The Typist Gets Married (1934)
- The Midnight Prince (1934)
- Hotel Free Exchange (1934)
- If I Were Boss (1934)
- Fanfare of Love (1935)
- Tovaritch (1935)
- Girls of Paris (1936)
- The Heart Disposes (1936)
- The Green Jacket (1937)
- The Beauty of Montparnasse (1937)
- The Man from Nowhere (1937)
- Rasputin (1938)
- Crossroads (1938)
- The Lafarge Case (1938)
- Paid Holidays (1938)
- The Duraton Family (1939)
- The Phantom Carriage (1939)
- Annette and the Blonde Woman (1942)
- Eight Men in a Castle (1942)
- I Am with You (1943)
- La Main du diable (1943)
- Picpus (1943)
- Florence Is Crazy (1944)
- Box of Dreams (1945)
- Mademoiselle X (1945)
- Boule de suif (1945)
- Messieurs Ludovic (1946)
- The Queen's Necklace (1946)
- Jericho (1946)
- The Uncatchable Mr. Frederic (1946)
- The Sea Rose (1946)
- Messieurs Ludovic (1946)
- The Grand Hotel Affair (1946)
- Rumours (1947)
- The Royalists (1947)
- The Eleven O'Clock Woman (1948)
- The Dance of Death (1948)
- The Farm of Seven Sins (1949)
- Dakota 308 (1951)
- Gigolo (1951)
- The Road to Damascus (1952)
- On Trial (1954)
- Nana (1955)
- Marguerite de la nuit (1955)
- If Paris Were Told to Us (1956)
- King of Hearts (1966)
