= Girls of Paris =

1936 film

- Directed by: Claude Vermorel
- Written by: Claude Vermorel
- Produced by: Pierre Pellegrin
- Starring: Michel Simon; Mireille Balin; Paul Azaïs
- Cinematography: Jacques Mercanton; Louis Page; Maurice Pesquiné
- Edited by: Marcelle Saysset
- Music by: Henri Verdun
- Production company: Les Productions Pellegrin
- Distributed by: Les Productions Pellegrin
- Release date: 9 November 1936
- Running time: 90 minutes
- Country: France
- Language: French

Girls of Paris (French: Jeunes filles de Paris) is a 1936 French comedy drama film directed by Claude Vermorel and starring Michel Simon, Mireille Balin and Paul Azaïs. The film's sets were designed by the art director Jean Douarinou.

== Synopsis ==
The film follows a variety of differing characters as they go about their lives in the French capital including a wealthy banker, a tramp, a young mother and a woman trying to choose between two suitors.

== Cast ==
- Michel Simon as Baron de Beaupoil and his brother
- Mireille Balin as Gine
- Paul Azaïs as Henri Maubert
- Nadia Sibirskaïa as Andrée Maubert
- Raymond Cordy as Emile le Taxi
- Maurice Baquet as Gaston
- Mady Berry as Madame Maubert
- Armand Bour as Le vieux monsieur
- Jean Darcante as Roland
- Renée Dargent as Mimi
- Aline Debray
- Marcel Delaître as Maubert
- Charles Dorat as Jacques
- Gilbert Gil as Georges Levaut
- Claire Gérard as Madame Levaut
- Léon Larive
- Marguerite Moreno as La baronne de Beaupoil
- Françoise Morhange as Jeannette Maubert
- Palau as Levaut - le pharmacien
- André Roanne as Jo
- Gabrielle Roanne

== Bibliography ==
- Crisp, Colin. Genre, Myth and Convention in the French Cinema, 1929-1939. Indiana University Press, 2002.
