= Claire Gérard =

Belgian actress (1889–1971)

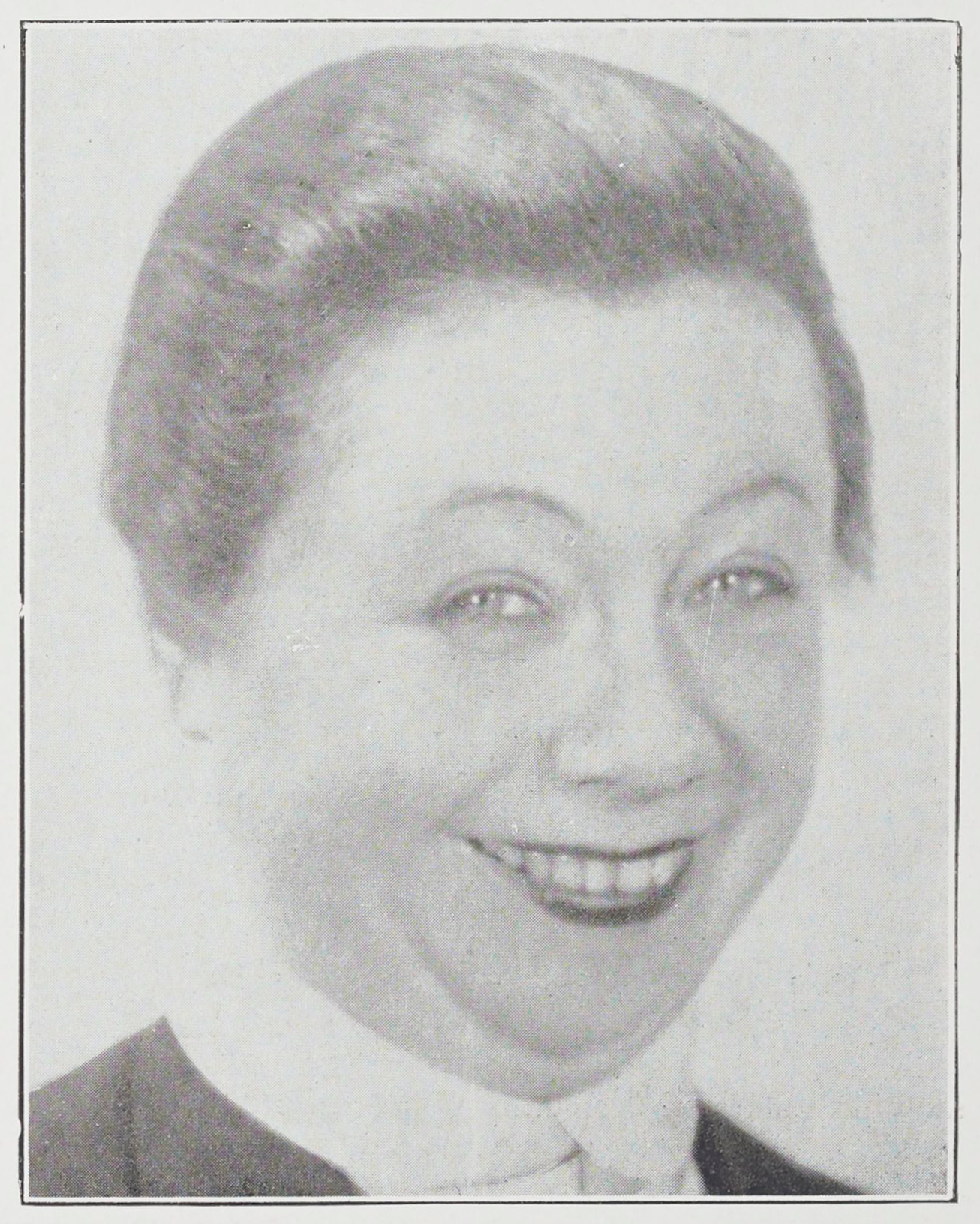
- Gérard in 1937.
- Born: 12 March 1889; Saint-Gilles, Brussels, Belgium
- Died: March 24, 1971 (aged 82); Paris, France
- Occupation: Actress
- Years active: 1932–1958 (film)

Claire Gérard (1889–1971) was a Belgian stage and film actress. She appeared regularly in French cinema in supporting roles.

== Selected filmography ==
- The Marriage of Mademoiselle Beulemans (1932)
- Jeanne (1934)
- If I Were Boss (1934)
- Hotel Free Exchange (1934)
- Crime and Punishment (1935)
- A Rare Bird (1935)
- Girls of Paris (1936)
- Death on the Run (1936)
- School for Journalists (1936)
- Three Days Leave (1936)
- Under Western Eyes (1936)
- The Flame (1936)
- Forty Little Mothers (1936)
- Madelon's Daughter (1937)
- The Citadel of Silence (1937)
- Three Waltzes (1938)
- A Foolish Maiden (1938)
- Monsieur Breloque Has Disappeared (1938)
- Lights of Paris (1938)
- La Bête Humaine (1938)
- The City of Lights (1938)
- The Time of the Cherries (1938)
- The Little Thing (1938)
- Monsieur Brotonneau (1939)
- Place de la Concorde (1939)
- Whirlwind of Paris (1939)
- Cocoanut (1939)
- The White Slave (1939)
- Immediate Call (1939)
- Serenade (1940)
- Mystery Trip (1947)
- After Love (1948)
- Fandango (1949)
- The Red Signal (1949)
- A Change in the Wind (1949)
- The Voyage to America (1951)
- The Girl with the Whip (1952)
- Wonderful Mentality (1953)
- Adam Is Eve (1954)
- Service Entrance (1954)

== Bibliography ==
- Davis, Colin. Postwar Renoir: Film and the Memory of Violence. Routledge, 2012.
- Goble, Alan. The Complete Index to Literary Sources in Film. Walter de Gruyter, 1999.
