= The Siege of the Alcazar =

1940 film by Augusto Genina

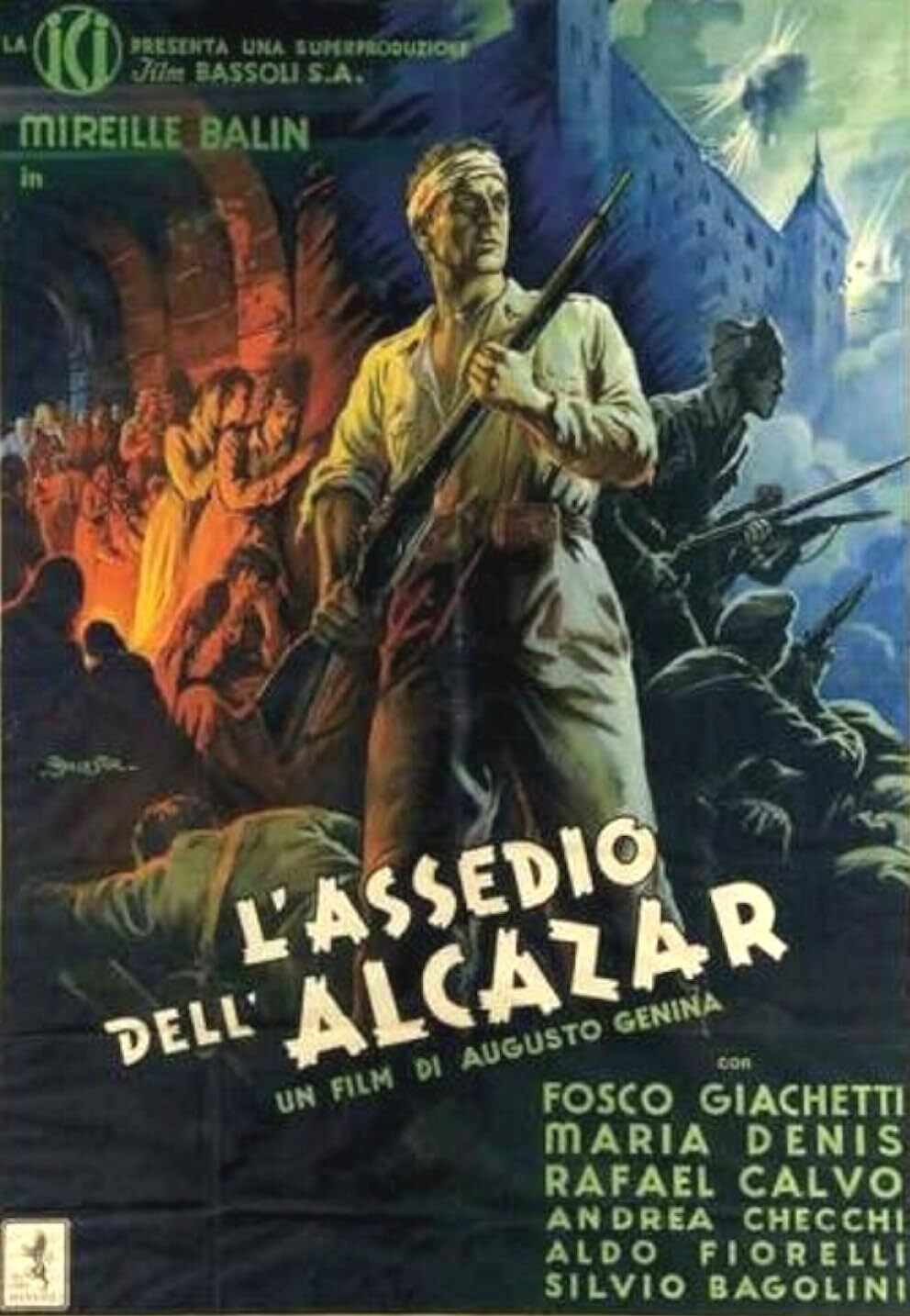
- Directed by: Augusto Genina
- Written by: Augusto Genina; Alessandro De Stefani; Pietro Caporilli
- Starring: Fosco Giachetti; Mireille Balin; Maria Denis
- Cinematography: Francesco Izzarelli; Vincenzo Seratrice; Jan Stallich
- Edited by: Fernando Tropea
- Music by: Antonio Veretti
- Release date: 20 August 1940 (Italy)
- Running time: 99 (cut) minutes 119 (restored) minutes
- Countries: Italy; Spain
- Language: Italian

The Siege of the Alcazar or L'Assedio dell'Alcazar is a 1940 Italian war film directed by Augusto Genina about the famous siege of the Alcázar during the Spanish Civil War, set in Toledo, Spain. The film won the Mussolini Cup in Venice Film Festival for being the Best Italian Film. The film runs more in the Spanish dubbed version, it was restored by Filmoteca Española and released in DVD in Spain by Divisa Home Video. The film was shot in Cinecittà with Italian, French and Spanish actors. In the Italian version all three non-Italian actors (Mireille Balin, Rafael Calvo and Carlos Muñoz) spoke their lines in Italian. They were dubbed by Italian actors afterwards.

== Plot ==
The Alcázar of Toledo is a historical fortification where the Spanish Infantry Academy was based and was held by Nationalists supporting the 18 July 1936 coup attempt against the Spanish Republic. The Republicans invested the Alcazar and besiege it for months against determined Nationalist resistance, before the siege was lifted by Franco forces with the Army of Africa under General José Enrique Varela.

== Cast ==
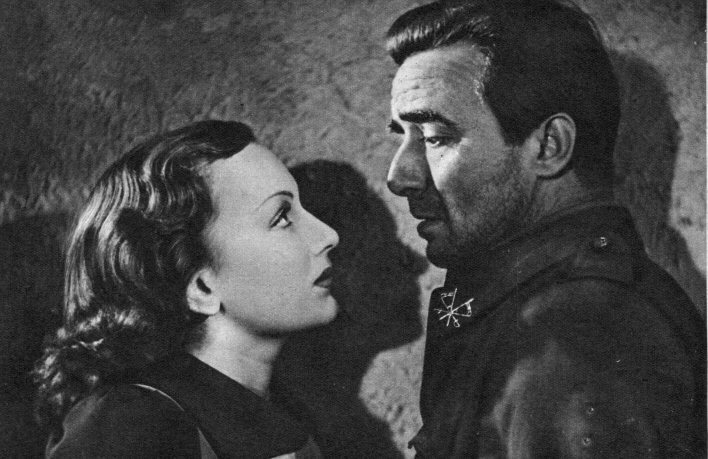
Mireille Balin and Fosco Giachetti in 'The siege of the Alcazar'

- Fosco Giachetti : Captain Vela
- Mireille Balin : Carmen Herrera
- María Denis : Conchita Álvarez
- Rafael Calvo Ruiz de Morales : Colonel José Moscardó Ituarte
- Carlos Muñoz : Colonel Moscardò's son
- Aldo Fiorelli: Francisco
- Andrea Checchi: Perro
- Carlo Tamberlani: Captain Vincenzo Alba
- Sivio Bagolini: Paolo Montez
- Checco Rissone: radiotelegrafista

== Awards ==
The film won the Mussolini Cup in Venice Film Festival for being the Best Italian Film.

== Releases ==
The Italian version was released in Italy in August 1940. The Spanish version of the film, known as Sin novedad en el Alcázar was released in Spain in October 1940. After the war, the film was re-released in Italy under the new title 'Alcazar' with significant cuts. All references to the involvement of Italy in the Spanish Civil War as well as the cruelty of the Republicans were excised to avoid any political debate.
