= Sperrbezirk =

1966 film by Will Tremper

- Directed by: Will Tremper
- Screenplay by: Will Tremper
- Produced by: Ernst Neubach
- Starring: Harald Leipnitz; Suzanne Roquette; Guido Baumann
- Cinematography: Hans Jura
- Edited by: Ursula Möhrle
- Music by: Heinz Schreiter
- Production company: Universum
- Release date: 3 June 1966
- Running time: 94 min
- Country: West Germany
- Language: German

Sperrbezirk is a 1966 West German comedy drama film directed by Will Tremper and starring Harald Leipnitz, Suzanne Roquette and Guido Baumann. It is adapted from a story by Ernst Neubach. The film was also known as Sperrbezirk, das Geschäft mit der Unmoral (Sperrbezirk, the business of immorality).

== Plot ==
Young and attractive Ann works in a Berlin drive-in cinema. One day, she meets an eloquent and charming estate agent, Bernie Kallmann, who Ann quickly falls in love with. Unknown to Ann, Bernie's apparent attraction towards her, as with many other women, is because Kallmann is a pimp and a significant member of the ring that controls all prostitution in the city.

When Bernie knows Ann's feelings for sure, he persuades her to work on the streets a prostitute. Bernie makes a big mistake, he falls in love with Ann. Now Kallmann, after he has pushed his beau into prostitution, tries to get Ann out of it. This causes massive conflicts with the rest of the pimp gang. Kallmann has to pay for the rediscovery of his humanity with his own life.

== Cast ==
- Harald Leipnitz ... Bernie Kallmann
- Suzanne Roquette ... Ann
- Guido Baumann ... Detlev Rhombus
- Rudolf Schündler ... Klipitzki
- Ruth Maria Kubitschek ... Blue Eyed
- Ingeborg Schöner ... Jolly
- Karel Štěpánek ... Inspector Wagner
- Bruce Low ... Police President
- Christian Rode ... Fopper
- Helga Zeckra ... Detta
- Ursula van der Wielen ... Dora
- Christina von Falz-Fein ... Baroness
- Ernst Neubach ... Napoleon
- Max Nosseck ... Nossy
- Hans Bergmann ... Schameczco

== Reviews ==
Tremper himself described Sperrbezirk as "A gruesome story of an naive country girl, which becomes a hooker out of love."

The Lexikon des internationalen Films summed the film up as "a draw between mischief, brutality and speculation fluctuating colportage. The implied dispute with prostitution is merely inadequate camouflage."
