= The Long Teeth =

- Directed by: Daniel Gélin
- Written by: Michel Audiard; Marcel Camus; Daniel Gélin
- Produced by: Jacques Roitfeld, Sirius
- Starring: Danièle Delorme; Louis de Funès
- Cinematography: Robert Juillard
- Edited by: Louisette Hautecoeur
- Music by: Paul Misraki
- Distributed by: Société des films Sirius
- Release date: 11 March 1953
- Running time: 90 minutes
- Country: France
- Language: French

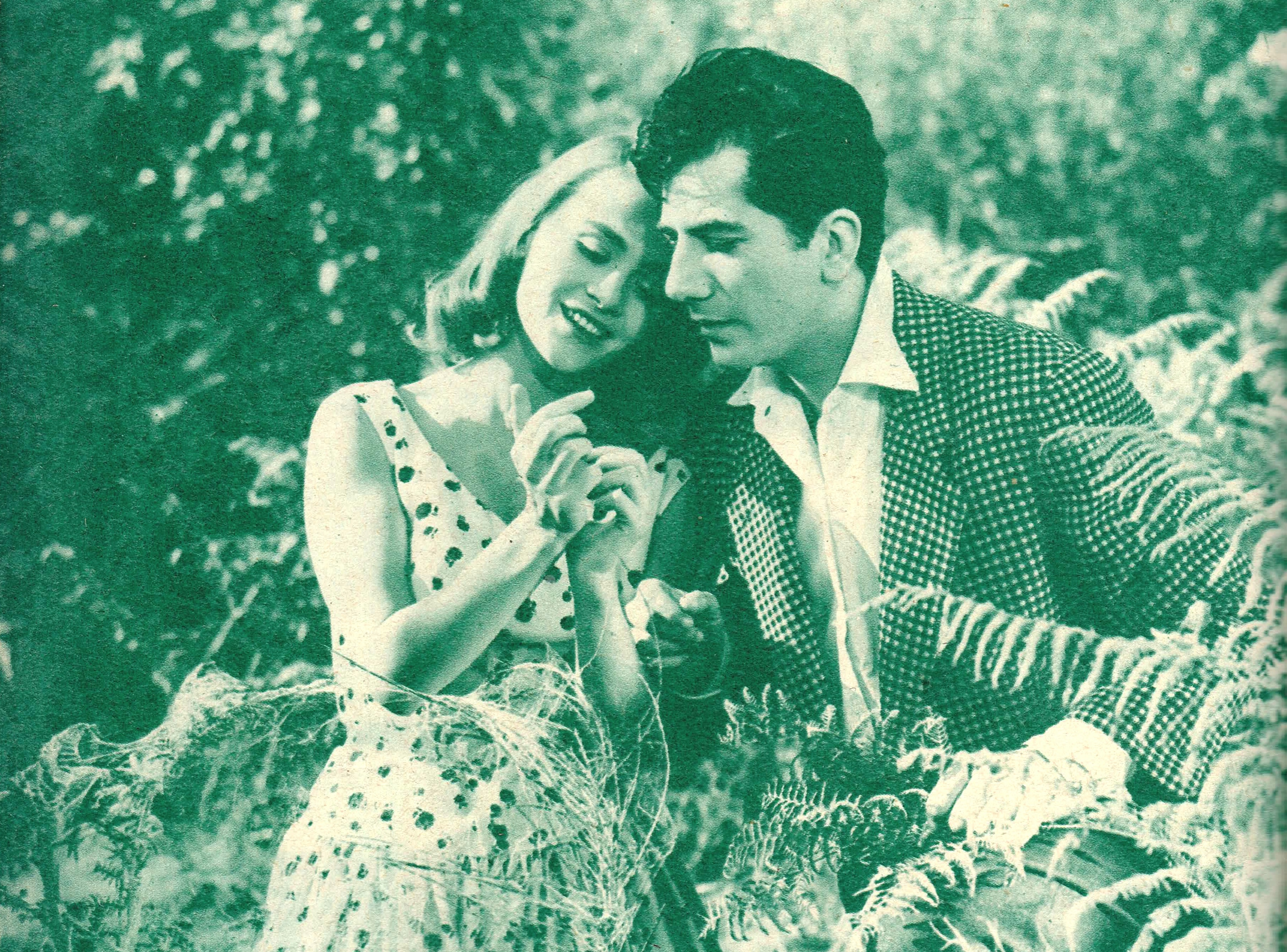
Scene from the film, originally published in a Japanese Magazine.

The Long Teeth (original title "Les Dents longues") is a French comedy drama film from 1953, directed by Daniel Gélin, written by Michel Audiard. It features Danièle Delorme, Louis de Funès, Roger Vadim and Brigitte Bardot. The story is based on Jacques Robert's novel "Les dents longues".

== Cast ==
- Danièle Delorme: Eva Commandeur (Louis Commandeur's wife)
- Daniel Gélin: Louis Commandeur (Eva's husband)
- Jean Chevrier: Mr Walter (editor-in-chief of "Paris-France")
- Louis Seigner: Antoine Josserand (director of weekly journal "Le Canut")
- Olivier Hussenot: André Maurienne (the legal correspondent)
- Jean Debucourt: Mr Goudal (Mr Walter's close colleague)
- René Hiéronimus: Mr Renoir (Mr Walter's colleague)
- Colette Mars: Carmen (the party organiser)
- Louis de Funès: the employee in the photographic laboratory
- Gaby Bruyère: Maud (Mr Bruni's teacher)
- Louis Bugette: "Papa" (the press photographer)
- Robert Rollis: Bob (the barman in the dance hall)
- Joëlle Bernard: Raymonde Josserand (Antoine's wife)
- Roger Vadim: a witness to the marriage of Louis and Eva
- Brigitte Bardot: the wife of the aforementioned witness to a marriage
- Judith Magre: Mr Commandeur's secretary
- Yvette Etievant: Yvonne (Mr Walter's secretary)
- Christian Argentin: Mr Bruni (the suspicious politician)
- Paul Ville: Mr Bourdon (manager of "Le Canut")
- René Lacourt: the caretaker

== Production ==
Danièle Delorme said in an interview that filming would begin in July 1952, though filming only began in mid September 1952 in Lyon. The film was in pre-production for six months, with five continuity scripts written, and it was predicted that filming would last eight weeks.
