= Macao (1942 film) =

1942 film

- Poster for the 1942 version
- Directed by: Jean Delannoy
- Written by: Pierre-Gilles Veber; Roger Vitrac
- Based on: Macao by Maurice Dekobra
- Produced by: Adolphe Osso; André Paulvé
- Starring: Sessue Hayakawa; Mireille Balin; Henri Guisol
- Cinematography: Nicolas Hayer
- Edited by: William Barache; Jean Mondollot
- Music by: Georges Auric
- Production companies: Demo Films; Fides Film
- Distributed by: DisCina
- Release date: 11 April 1942
- Running time: 90 minutes
- Country: France
- Language: French

Macao or Gambling Hell (French: Macao, l'enfer du jeu) is a 1942 French drama film directed by Jean Delannoy and starring Sessue Hayakawa, Mireille Balin and Henri Guisol. It is based on the 1938 novel of the same title by Maurice Dekobra. It was shot at the Victorine Studios in Nice. The film's sets were designed by the art director Serge Piménoff. When production began in 1939, Erich von Stroheim was cast in the role of Werner von Krall. Production delays and the German occupation of France in 1940, meant that the film's completion and release was delayed. The scenes with Von Stroheim had to be re-shot at Cité Elgé in Paris, with Pierre Renoir taking over the role for a 1942 release. Only after the Liberation was the original version screened.

== Synopsis ==
In the near lawless port of Macao, arms dealer Werner Von Krall rescues singer Mireille from a firing squad. He soon enters into a weapons deal with casino owner Yin Tchaï, who hides his criminal life from his daughter Jasmine. When the deal fails and his debts mount, Von Krall kidnaps Jasmine to force an escape. Their conflict reaches a climax that forces both men to face the consequences of their trade.

== Cast ==
- Sessue Hayakawa as Ying Tchaï
- Mireille Balin as Mireille
- Henri Guisol as Almaido
- Erich von Stroheim as Werner von Krall
- Louise Carletti as Jasmine
- Jim Gérald as Un matelot
- Marie Lorain as Mademoiselle Marguenon
- Alexandre Mihalesco as Yassouda
- Etienne Decroux as Un autre matelot
- Tsugundo Maki as Le secrétaire de Ying Tchaï
- Georges Lannes as Le capitaine
- Roland Toutain as Pierre Milley
- Pierre Renoir as Werner von Krall (reshot 1942 version)
- Ginette Baudin as Une joueuse
- Chukry-Bey as L'officier chinois
- Georges Térof as Le général Lin-Tse

== Bibliography ==
- Crisp, C.G. The Classic French Cinema, 1930–1960. Indiana University Press, 1993.
- Roust, Colin Thomas. Sounding French: The Film Music and Criticism of Georges Auric, 1919–1945. University of Michigan, 2007.
- Waldman, Harry. Beyond Hollywood's Grasp: American Filmmakers Abroad, 1914–1945. Bloomsbury Academic, 1994.
