= Christian Argentin =

French actor (1893–1955)

- Occupation: Actor

Christian Robert Pierre Argentin (11 October 1893 – 27 November 1955) was a French stage and film actor.

Argentin was born in Elbeuf, Seine-Inférieure (now Seine-Maritime), France and died in Paris. He made his film debut in a 1912 short titled Alerte! and his final film in the 1955 Daniel Gélin-directed drama Les dents longues (The Long Teeth).

== Filmography ==
- 1923 : L'Enfant roi
- 1931 : Luck : an owner
- 1931 : La Chienne : a judge
- 1931 : When Do You Commit Suicide?
- 1931 : The Man in Evening Clothes
- 1932 : Avec l'assurance
- 1932 : Coiffeur pour dames : Louvet
- 1932 : La Perle : Médios
- 1932 : To Live Happily : Ruffat
- 1932 : A Star Disappears : Lui-même
- 1933 : Iris perdue et retrouvée
- 1933 : The Agony of the Eagles : Minister Villèle
- 1934 : Arlette and Her Fathers : professor
- 1934 : Fanatisme : Pietri
- 1934 : The Last Billionaire : Finance Minister
- 1934 : If I Were Boss : Sicaud
- 1934 : Une Vocation irrésistible
- 1935 : La Mariée du régiment
- 1935 : La Sonnette d'alarme : Professor Bodart
- 1936 : The King : Gabrier
- 1936 : Les Petites alliées
- 1936 : Marthe Richard : admiral
- 1938 : Crossroads : Anwalt, lawyer
- 1938 : J'étais une aventurière : Van Kongen
- 1938 : L'Ange que j'ai vendu : Staphoulos
- 1938 : La Route enchantée : a director
- 1938 : Place de la Concorde
- 1940 : Cavalcade d'amour : a chaplain
- 1940 : Sur le plancher des vaches : a director
- 1941 : Cartacalha, reine des gitans
- 1942 : The Trump Card : a hotel manager
- 1947 : Si jeunesse savait : Villemotte
- 1948 : Clochemerle : bishop
- 1949 : The Widow and the Innocent : a minister
- 1952 : La Fête à Henriette : l'Excellence
- 1952 : Les Dents longues : Bronnier
- 1952 : Monsieur Leguignon, Signalman : a lawyer for plaintiff
- 1954 : Crainquebille : a lawyer
- 1953 : Le Défroqué : an officer
- 1954 : Ma petite folie : a jeweller

== Theatre ==
- 1925 : Les Marchands de gloire de Marcel Pagnol et Paul Nivoix, théâtre de la Madeleine
- 1931 : La Crise ministérielle de Tristan Bernard, théâtre Albert 1^{er}
- 1931 : Le Sauvage de Tristan Bernard, mise en scène Henri Burguet, théâtre Albert 1^{er}
- 1932 : 5 à 7 d'Andrée Mery, théâtre de la Potinière
- 1951 : Le Visiteur d'Albert Dubeux, théâtre Daunou
