= If I Were Boss (1934 film) =

1934 film

- Directed by: Richard Pottier
- Written by: André Cerf; Jacques Prévert; René Pujol
- Starring: Fernand Gravey; Max Dearly; Mireille Balin
- Cinematography: Jean Bachelet
- Edited by: Pierre Méguérian
- Music by: Henri Poussigue
- Production company: Para Film
- Distributed by: Pathé Consortium Cinéma
- Release date: 26 October 1934
- Running time: 100 minutes
- Country: France
- Language: French

If I Were Boss (French: Si j'étais le patron) is a 1934 French comedy film directed by Richard Pottier and starring Fernand Gravey, Max Dearly and Mireille Balin. The film's sets were designed by the art director Jacques Krauss. The depiction of a struggling business has been regarded as a metaphor for the wider state of French industry at the height of the Great Depression. It was produced the same year as a number of financial scandals hit French firms.

== Synopsis ==
Henri an employee at a car factory develops a revolutionary new improvement but his views are rejected as he faces the sack as a troublemaker. However the failing business is backed by an eccentric investor on the condition that Henri is appointed as manager of the firm. His new invention rescues the company, propelling it to success.

== Cast ==
- Fernand Gravey as Henri Janvier
- Max Dearly as M. Maubert
- Mireille Balin as Marcelle
- Charles Dechamps as Sainclair
- Madeleine Guitty as Mme Pichu
- Pierre Palau as Archibald Torrington
- Pierre Larquey as Jules
- Georges Vitray as M. Leroy
- Jane Pierson as Une actionnaire
- Claire Gérard as Mme Villiers
- André Dubosc as Un actionnaire
- Anthony Gildès as M. Triangle
- Pierre Darteuil as Villiers
- Christian Argentin as Sicaud
- Pierre Huchet as Un actionnaire

== Bibliography ==
- Bessy, Maurice & Chirat, Raymond. Histoire du cinéma français: 1929-1934. Pygmalion, 1988.
- Crisp, Colin. French Cinema—A Critical Filmography: Volume 1, 1929-1939. Indiana University Press, 2015.
- Rège, Philippe. Encyclopedia of French Film Directors, Volume 1. Scarecrow Press, 2009.
