= Sundown Valley =

1944 film by Benjamin H. Kline

- Theatrical release poster
- Directed by: Benjamin H. Kline
- Screenplay by: Luci Ward
- Produced by: Jack Fier
- Starring: Charles Starrett; Dub Taylor; Jeanne Bates; Jimmy Wakely
- Cinematography: George Meehan
- Edited by: Aaron Stell
- Production company: Columbia Pictures
- Distributed by: Columbia Pictures
- Release date: March 23, 1944
- Running time: 55 minutes
- Country: United States
- Language: English

Sundown Valley is a 1944 American Western film directed by Benjamin H. Kline and written by Luci Ward. The film stars Charles Starrett, Dub Taylor, Jeanne Bates and Jimmy Wakely. The film was released on March 23, 1944, by Columbia Pictures.

== Cast ==
- Charles Starrett as Steve Denton
- Dub Taylor as Cannonball Boggs
- Jeanne Bates as Sidney Hawkins
- Jimmy Wakely as Jimmy Holman
- Jessie Arnold as Mom Johnson
- Clancy Cooper as Hodge Miller
- Jack Ingram as Bart Adams
- Wheeler Oakman as Cab Baxter
- Joel Friedkin as Joe Calloway
- Grace Lenard as Sally Jenks
- Eddie Laughton as Tom Carleton
- Forrest Taylor as "Gun-Sight" Hawkins
- Bob Kortman as Gorman
- Steve Clark as Dave
- Budd Buster as Haines
- Edmund Cobb as Franklin
- Blackie Whiteford as Shane
- Dick Hartman as Musician
- W.J. Blair as Musician
- Elmer Warren as Musician
- Pappy Wolf as Musician
