= Golden Venus =

1938 film

- Directed by: Jean Delannoy; Charles Méré
- Written by: Jean-Louis Bouquet; Pierre Sabatier (play)
- Starring: Jacques Copeau; Daniel Lecourtois; Mireille Balin
- Cinematography: Nicolas Hayer
- Edited by: Jean Delannoy; Jean Hénin; Raymonde Nevers
- Music by: René Sylviano; Georges Truc
- Production company: Consortium General du Film
- Distributed by: D.U.C.
- Release date: 13 May 1938
- Running time: 95 minutes
- Country: France
- Language: French

Golden Venus (French: La Vénus de l'or) is a 1938 French adventure film directed by Jean Delannoy and Charles Méré and starring Jacques Copeau, Daniel Lecourtois and Mireille Balin.

The film's sets were designed by the art director Robert Dumesnil.

== Cast ==
In alphabetical order

- René Alié
- Mireille Balin as Judith
- Georges Bever
- Rivers Cadet as Boinaud
- Géo Charlys
- Jacques Copeau as Harfstrong
- Suzanne Delvé as Diane d'Aiguebelle
- Maurice Devienne
- Saturnin Fabre as Le duc de Sartène
- Andrée Guize as Michèle
- Daniel Lecourtois as André de Saint-Guillon
- Géo Leroy
- Pierre Magnier as Le colonel Devrard
- Alexandre Mathillon
- Franck Maurice as Un matelot
- Alexandre Mihalesco as Ibrahim
- André Robert
- René Stern
- Gaston Séverin as Silverstein

== Bibliography ==
- Goble, Alan. The Complete Index to Literary Sources in Film. Walter de Gruyter, 1999.
