= Horror noir =

Film genre

Horror noir (also called noir horror or hyphenated as horror-noir; lit. 'black horror') is a subgenre that blends the conventions of horror with those of film noir. It is characterized by dark visual or narrative styles, morally ambiguous characters, and plots involving crime or investigation, alongside elements intended to evoke fear, such as the supernatural, the grotesque, or psychological terror. The subgenre commonly explores themes of fatalism, corruption, and existential anxiety; the term is most often applied to films from the mid-20th century onward.

Stories in this subgenre often focus on morally conflicted protagonists placed in urban environments, where they face both external threats and personal corruption. Plots frequently carry a fatalistic tone, with characters drawn into situations they cannot fully escape.

As in classic noir, low-key lighting and strong contrasts between light and shadow are commonly used. Themes such as paranoia, guilt, and unease appear regularly, contributing to a bleak tone. The overlap between horror and noir became more visible in mid-20th-century cinema, when some filmmakers began combining detective-style narratives with supernatural or psychological subject matter.

Films frequently discussed in relation to horror noir include works such as Cat People, The Seventh Victim, Night of the Demon, and Angel Heart, which merge noir-influenced visual style and themes with psychological or supernatural horror. The term has also been used more recently for films that blend noir style with contemporary horror.

The term has been used retrospectively by film critics and scholars to describe a range of films from the mid-20th century to the present that blend stylistic and thematic aspects of both genres.

Examples sometimes discussed as horror noir include Among the Living, The Mask of Diijon, The Night of the Hunter, The Phantom Speaks, The Red House, and The Spiral Staircase. In more contemporary discussions, neo-noir horror films such as Blood Simple, Shutter Island, Lost Highway, and Mulholland Drive are also occasionally included.

== Characteristics ==
Horror noir brings together horror themes and elements commonly associated with film noir. Visual style often includes low-key lighting, deep shadows, and high contrast, creating a dark tone.

Settings are frequently urban, with many scenes taking place at night or in confined interiors. These environments support themes of isolation, paranoia, and moral uncertainty. The central figures are often conflicted or unstable characters who encounter supernatural or disturbing forces. In some cases, these threats reflect internal struggles rather than purely external danger.

Many stories also follow investigative or mystery-based structures. Detectives, journalists, or ordinary individuals may uncover hidden events or dangers, echoing narrative patterns found in noir.

== History ==
The development of horror noir is often linked to the 1940s and 1950s, during the period associated with classical film noir. At that time, some films began to combine noir’s visual style and pessimistic tone with elements of horror.

Frequently cited early examples include Cat People and The Seventh Victim, which blend urban noir atmospheres with paranoia, occult themes, and psychological fear. Later films such as Night of the Demon further developed this mix by combining investigative plots with supernatural horror.

In later decades, filmmakers continued to blend noir narratives with horror themes. For example, Angel Heart combines the structure of a noir detective story with supernatural and occult horror. In modern film studies, the term “horror noir” has also gained broader cultural attention through studies of race and representation in horror cinema, particularly highlighted by the documentary Horror Noire: A History of Black Horror.

== Criticism ==
The term “horror noir” is not always used consistently. Some scholars argue that it is applied too broadly, especially to films that share visual similarities rather than clear genre traits. Because film noir itself is often described as a style rather than a fixed genre, the boundaries can be unclear.

Others suggest that many films grouped under this label fit more closely within psychological horror or supernatural thriller categories. In this view, the overlap reflects broader cinematic tendencies—such as shadow-based lighting, pessimistic tone, and urban themes—rather than a distinct subgenre.

The term is also largely retrospective. Many films now described as horror noir were not identified that way when they were released, which has led to debate about whether the category reflects a historical grouping or later interpretation.

In addition, it has developed a separate meaning in discussions of race and horror cinema, particularly following work by Robin R. Means Coleman’s work and the documentary Horror Noire: A History of Black Horror. This dual usage can create ambiguity between stylistic descriptions and cultural analysis.

== Visual style ==
The visual style of horror noir draws heavily from film noir techniques while using imagery designed to heighten suspense and fear. It commonly features low-key lighting, sharp contrast between light and shadow, and extensive use of darkness to create tension.

Cinematography often includes stark framing, deep shadows, and unusual camera angles that distort space and enhance unease. Influences from German Expressionism are also frequently noted, particularly in the use of stylized lighting and exaggerated shadow patterns.

Typical settings include rainy streets, dim interiors, urban nightscapes, and confined spaces, which emphasize isolation and vulnerability. Visual motifs such as fog, mirrors, silhouettes, and partially obscured figures are often used to suggest hidden threats or psychological instability.

Eventually, these techniques create a bleak, fatalistic tone typical of noir and heighten the suspense and unease of horror.

== Music and sound design ==
Music in horror noir is generally used to build suspense and reinforce emotional tension. Scores often rely on low, sustained tones, dissonant strings, and minimal melodic structure to create unease.

While some elements may draw from noir traditions such as jazz influences, they are typically altered into darker, more distorted forms to match the horror tone. Silence is also used strategically to heighten anticipation and emphasize moments of shock or dread.

Horror noir integrates these approaches into a unified soundscape. Scores often employ sparse orchestration, repetitive motifs, and sustained tones to heighten tension, while silence is used deliberately to intensify anticipation. Claudia Gorbman, in Unheard Melodies: Narrative Film Music, observes that film music “guides the spectator’s emotional response” while remaining largely unobtrusive.

== Films described as horror noir films ==
- The Night of the Hunter
- Les Diaboliques
- Across the Hall
- The Believers
- Lord of Illusions
- Dementia
- Angel Heart
- The First Power
- The Amazing Mr. X
- Aake
- Burning Kiss
- The Ninth Gate
- Singapore Sling

== See also ==
- History of horror films
- Crime film
- Neo-noir
- Social horror (social thriller)
- Crime horror films
