= Ernst Neubach =

Austrian screenwriter, producer and director (1900–1968)

- Born: 3 January 1900; Vienna, Austria-Hungary
- Died: 21 May 1968 (aged 68); Munich, West Germany
- Spouses: Hertha Helene Langer; Margaret Jenni

Ernst Neubach (3 January 1900 – 21 May 1968) was an Austrian screenwriter, producer and director.

== Biography ==
Of Jewish descent, Neubach was a veteran of World War I, after which he worked as a master of ceremonies in Austria, Switzerland and Germany. He wrote lyrics for songs and over 2,000 hits, including I've lost my heart in Heidelberg (1925) and In Heaven There Is No Beer (1956). Successful operetta librettos include Gentleman Jack (Music: Carita by Horst). With the dawn of the talkie era, he began to write screenplays for musical comedies.

After the Nazis seized power in 1933, Neubach lived mostly in Vienna. On 9 March 1937, he became a member of the Patriotic Front.

After the Anschluss, Neubach emigrated to France. There, he worked as a screenwriter from 1938 to 1939. As a member of the French Foreign Legion, he served in North Africa from 1940 to 1941. On 29 September 1942, he fled to Switzerland to escape the threat of deportation. He stayed there until three months after the war had ended in a hotel in Zollikon.

In August 1945, Neubach moved back to France. He worked as a scriptwriter in 1948 and in 1952, he returned to West Germany, where he worked as a writer. He founded Neubach-Film GmbH in Munich, which produced his 1955 movies.

Neubach married Hertha Helene Langer in July 1945, but the marriage ended in divorce. He later married Margaret Jenni, with whom he had a daughter.

== Films directed by Ernst Neubach ==
- 1932 : Trenck, (co-directed by Heinz Paul)
- 1949 : The Red Signal
- 1949 : On demande un assassin (We request a murderer)
- 1951 : Les Mémoires de la vache Yolande (The Memoirs of Cow Yolande)
- 1952 : I Lost My Heart in Heidelberg
- 1952 : You Only Live Once
- 1955 : The Inn on the Lahn
- 1957 : Der Kaiser und das Wäschermädel

== Screenplays ==
- 1930 : Vienna, City of Song, directed by Richard Oswald
- 1930 : A Student's Song of Heidelberg (co-written with Hans Wilhelm), directed by Karl Hartl
- 1930 : The Tender Relatives (co-written with Fritz Friedmann-Frederich), directed by Richard Oswald
- 1931 : Der Liebesarzt, directed by Erich Schönfelder
- 1931 : Kasernenzauber (dialogue), directed by Carl Boese
- 1931 : The Man in Search of His Murderer (play), directed by Robert Siodmak
- 1931 : Queen of the Night (co-written with Harry Kahn), directed by Fritz Wendhausen
- 1931 : Once I Loved a Girl in Vienna (co-written with Richard Rillo), directed by Erich Schönfelder
- 1931 : Weekend in Paradise, directed by Robert Land
- 1932 : Two Heavenly Blue Eyes, directed by Johannes Meyer
- 1932 : Viennese Waltz (book), directed by Conrad Wiene
- 1932 : Trenck (co-written with Heinz Paul), directed by Ernst Neubach and Heinz Paul
- 1933 : Keinen Tag ohne Dich, directed by Hans Behrendt
- 1933 : A Song Goes Round the World, directed by Richard Oswald
- 1934 : When You're Young, the World Belongs to You, directed by Richard Oswald
- 1934 : Spring Parade (story), directed by Géza von Bolváry
- 1934 : My Song Goes Round the World (story), directed by Richard Oswald
- 1935 : Suburban Cabaret, directed by Werner Hochbaum
- 1936 : Heut' ist der schönste Tag in meinem Leben (story), directed by Richard Oswald
- 1938 : Gibraltar (co-written with Jacques Companeez and Hans Jacoby), directed by Fedor Ozep
- 1939 : Personal Column (co-written with Jacques Companeez), directed by Robert Siodmak
- 1940 : Serenade (co-written with Jacques Companeez and Max Maret), directed by Jean Boyer
- 1946 : That's Not the Way to Die (co-written with André Tabet), directed by Jean Boyer
- 1946 : Devil and the Angel (co-written with Jacques Companeez and Louis Ducreux), directed by Pierre Chenal
- 1947 : The Marriage of Ramuntcho (co-written with Pierre Apestéguy and André Tabet), directed by Max de Vaucorbeil
- 1947 : The Sharks of Gibraltar (co-written with Norbert Carbonnaux and Jacques Companeez), directed by Emil-Edwin Reinert
- 1947 : Une nuit à Tabarin (co-written with Herbert Victor), directed by Karel Lamač
- 1949 : Le Signal rouge (co-written with Herbert Victor), directed by Ernst Neubach
- 1949 : On demande un assassin (co-written with André Tabet), directed by Ernst Neubach
- 1951 : Les Mémoires de la vache Yolande (co-written with Emil-Edwin Reinert), directed by Ernst Neubach
- 1952 : I Lost My Heart in Heidelberg (co-written with Gustav Kampendonk), directed by Ernst Neubach
- 1952 : You Only Live Once, directed by Ernst Neubach
- 1953 : Mailman Mueller (story), directed by John Reinhardt and Heinz Rühmann
- 1953 : Tourbillon (Whirlwind), directed by Alfred Rode
- 1954 : My Sister and I (co-written with Jacques Companeez and Joseph Than), directed by Paul Martin
- 1954 : The Big Star Parade (co-written with Franz Tanzler), directed by Paul Martin
- 1955 : I Know What I'm Living For (novel and screenplay), directed by Paul Verhoeven
- 1955 : Die Wirtin an der Lahn, directed by Johann Alexander Hübler-Kahla
- 1956 : Die Fischerin vom Bodensee (story), directed by Harald Reinl
- 1957 : Aunt Wanda from Uganda, directed by Géza von Cziffra
- 1957 : Die Prinzessin von St. Wolfgang (story), directed by Harald Reinl
- 1957 : Der Kaiser und das Wäschermädel, directed by Ernst Neubach
- 1958 : A Song Goes Round the World, directed by Géza von Bolváry
- 1959 : Laß mich am Sonntag nicht allein (co-written with Adolf Schütz), directed by Arthur Maria Rabenalt
- 1960 : The Red Hand, directed by Kurt Meisel
- 1966 : Sperrbezirk (story), directed by Will Tremper

== Films produced by Neubach ==
Ernst Neubach had a production company named Neubach-Film.

- 1935 : Suburban Cabaret, directed by Werner Hochbaum
- 1935 : Ein Walzer um den Stephansturm, directed by Johann Alexander Hübler-Kahla
- 1936 : Shadows of the Past (executive producer), directed by Werner Hochbaum
- 1946 : On ne meurt pas comme ça (One Does Not Die That Way) (producer), directed by Jean Boyer
- 1947 : One Night at the Tabarin, directed by Karel Lamač
- 1955 : Ich weiß, wofür ich lebe, directed by Paul Verhoeven
- 1955 : Die Wirtin an der Lahn, directed by Johann Alexander Hübler-Kahla
- 1956 : Die Fischerin vom Bodensee (story), directed by Harald Reinl
- 1957 : Aunt Wanda from Uganda, directed by Géza von Cziffra
- 1957 : Die Prinzessin von St. Wolfgang (story), directed by Harald Reinl
- 1957 : Wetterleuchten um Maria, directed by Luis Trenker
- 1958 : Worüber man nicht spricht – Frauenarzt Dr. Brand greift ein, directed by Wolfgang Glück
- 1958 : A Song Goes Round the World, directed by Géza von Bolváry
- 1959 : Laß mich am Sonntag nicht allein (Co-production Neubach/Bavaria), directed by Arthur Maria Rabenalt
- 1960 : The Red Hand, directed by Kurt Meisel
- 1964 : Dog Eat Dog (Co-production Neubach/Unione Cinematografica Internazionale), directed by Ray Nazarro
- 1964 : The Cavern (Co-production Neubach/Cinedoris/20th Century Fox), directed by Edgar G. Ulmer
- 1966 : Sperrbezirk, directed by Will Tremper
