= Paul Lamkoff =

American singer (1888–1953)

- Born: Paul Lampkovitz; December 14, 1888; Plonsk, Russian Empire
- Died: March 11, 1953 (aged 64)
- Known for: Cantor, composer

Paul Lamkoff (né Lampkovitz, December 14, 1888 - March 11, 1953) was an American cantor and early Hollywood film composer.

== Background ==
Many details about Lamkoff's early life prior to emigrating to the United States are uncorroborated, including his place of birth and his musical training, and professional engagements. His place of birth is listed variously as either Poland or Russia. He was said to have trained at the Petrograd Conservatory (now the St. Petersburg Conservatory), possibly at the same time as future fellow Hollywood composer Dimitrio Tiomkin and also under Glazunov and Rimsky-Korsakov. He may have conducted opera throughout eastern Europe, and played violin with the Moscow Symphony Orchestra, and cantored.

In the 1922 he and his wife Eva Tisen emigrated to Cleveland, passing via Romania where in 1920 a daughter was born. In 1924 he settled in Los Angeles.

He also began working as a film composer, arranger, vocal coach, and music director. His earliest entry to the industry was the 1927 Warner Brothers film The Jazz Singer's Kol Nidre sequence, where he coached Jolson and arranged the choral background. Warner Brothers rehired him for the same role for the 1952 remake starring Danny Thomas.

The popularity of "talkies" that exploded in the late 1920s allowed the professional musicians already established in Los Angeles, like Lamkoff, to profit on the burgeoning film music industry, although much of Lamkoff's work went uncredited. At one point he transcribed "by dictation" a symphonic work that Fred Fisher was composing for a film sequence. Along with other talents like Alfred Newman, Johnny Green, and Ray Heindorf, he established the practice of major film studios' music departments being led by professional musicians.

Lamkoff is said to have been among the first to compose original music score for a Hollywood film, when he composed and copyrighted eight cues for the 1929 Lionel Barrymore film The Mysterious Island (though credit went to Martin Broones and Arthur Lange). Both he and Dimitri Tiomkin, a fellow graduate of St. Petersburg Conservatory, were working at MGM in 1930. Lamkoff orchestrated Tiomkin's Lullaby and Gypsy Song for the film Resurrection.

In the 1930s he served as cantor and choral director in many Los Angeles organizations, including for Temple Beth El in Hollywood, and in Joseph Achron's Los Angeles chapter of MAILAMM.

Lamkoff was actively involved overseas during World War II. The unpublished compositions Delia, Delia, From Manila and Down Leyte Way were copyrighted from Australia and from a US/APO warship address.

Outside of film music, Lamkoff's compositions include a 1944 symphony titled Survival of a Nation, a set of Hebrew songs for voice and piano published in 1929, a Solomon Golub setting written for the United Hebrew Choral Societies of the United States and Canada in 1923, many Yiddish songs (some of which were championed by Sidor Belarsky), and many songs written for hire.

In 1931, he married Sidon Goldman Kraus, who was born in Hlohovec, Hungary in 1887 and died in 1972.

== Selected filmography ==
- The King of Kings (1927), musical director & singer
- The Cossacks (1928)
- The Mysterious Island (1929)
- Romance (1930)
- Three Faces East (1930), composer of the love theme
- Resurrection (1931), arranger and vocal coach
- Treasure Island (1934), co-orchestrator with Charles Maxwell and Maurice de Packh
- A Night At The Opera (1935), vocal coach
- San Francisco (1936), vocal coach
- Cavalcade of San Francisco (1940), composer

== Selected songs ==
- And then I knew, lyrics by Howard Luhring
- Cloudy Moon, lyrics by Jimmy Birrell
- Dancing the Polka, lyrics by Grace Wilson & Boyd Wilson
- Delia, Delia, From Manila, written October 26, 2945
- Disappointing Dream, lyrics by Rosie Johnson
- Don't You Want To Go, lyrics by W. J. Endsley
- Down Leyte Way, written August 3, 1945
- Dreams Will Come True, lyrics by Marius Benson
- Fantasy, lyrics by Florence M. Strait
- Fashions of 57, lyrics by Georges E. Blais
- Going Home, lyrics by Francis J. Hoag
- Grandpa's Mountain Dew, lyrics by Virginia Hill
- He is the One, lyrics by John McDermott
- I Fall in Love That Way, lyrics by M. J. Parks
- I Gave, lyrics by Richard William Davis
- I Know You're Sorry, lyrics by Goldie Coots
- If I Only Knew, lyrics by Catherine Courtright
- If I Would Be an Angel, lyrics by Louis Schoener
- I'll Love You Forever If You'll Only Love Me, lyrics by Phillip L. Brown
- I'm In Love With a Dream, lyrics by Norma Lee Miller
- In Dreamland, lyrics by J. Schaffer
- I've Been a Fool, lyrics by Ronald T. Une
- I've Said Goodbye, lyrics by Evelyn Annis
- Jo Ann, lyrics by Harold P. Stock
- Little Boy Blue, lyrics by Stella Morrow
- Magical Heaven, lyrics by Julia Chavez
- Memories, lyrics by Vesta Scott
- Miss You, lyrics by Catherine Courtright
- My Darling Sweet Baby, lyrics by Mary Watson
- My Dolly, lyrics by Mary Watson
- My Lonely Cabin Home, lyrics by Lula Maud Bridler
- My Lonely Tears, lyrics by Vesta Scott
- My Old Missouri Ma, lyrics by Martha Jane Headrick
- Oh Papa, Be Good to Mama, lyrics by Lena T. Hucks
- An Optical Illusion, lyrics by Joe Margarette Albert
- The Rainbow 'Round my Sprinklers, lyrics by Louis Schoener
- Red Cross on Navy Blue, lyrics by Rosh Lee Page
- She is the Partner for Me, lyrics by Hallie Watson
- She's My Dream, lyrics by Mary Watson
- She's the Loveliest of her Kind, lyrics by Grace Jane Robinson
- Silvery Moon, lyrics by Herman H. Lucas
- Smile Awhile, lyrics by Thomas Jackson
- Sweetheart, Goodbye, lyrics by Don D. Miguel
- Tell It To Stop, lyrics by Evelyn Annis
- Things May Go Wrong, lyrics by Louis Schoener
- To You I Will Return, lyrics by Grace Wilson & Boyd Wilson
- A Tramp on the Street, lyrics by Mary Sue Maughn
- The Truth About My Love for You, lyrics by Ella Mae Adams
- Twilight Song, lyrics by Era Irvin
- A Walk in the Garden, lyrics by Vesta Scott
- We Love You, Dear Old Santa Claus, lyrics by Mary Watson
- We Were With You Millions Strong, lyrics by Myrtle Pullett
- We Won't Forget, lyrics by Lenora Johnson
- When Lilacs Bloom in the Month of May, lyrics by Louis Schoener
- When The Rainbow Meets the Mountain Top, lyrics by Melba Jean Culbertson
- Why Did You Go, lyrics by Fleming Johnson
- Why We're Apart, lyrics by Jesse Lester Roberts
- Wings in the Month of May, lyrics by Louis Schoener
- You are the Girl in my Play, lyrics by Louis Schoener
- You Are My Treasure, lyrics by Sarah Bell
