= 6th Independent Spirit Awards =

Film award edition

- Date: March 23, 1991
- Site: The Beverly Hilton; Los Angeles, California; U.S.
- Hosted by: Buck Henry

Highlights
- Best Film: The Grifters
- Most awards: To Sleep with Anger (4)
- Most nominations: House Party (7); To Sleep with Anger (7)

The 6th Independent Spirit Awards, honoring the best in independent filmmaking for 1990, were announced on March 23, 1991, at The Beverly Hilton in Los Angeles. The nominations were announced on January 20, 1991. It was hosted by Buck Henry.

== Winners and nominees ==
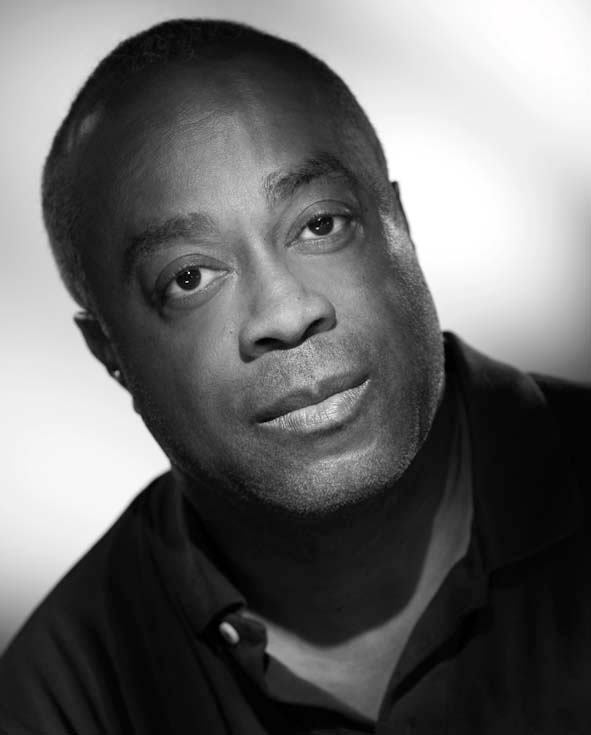
Charles Burnett, Best Director and Best Screenplay winner

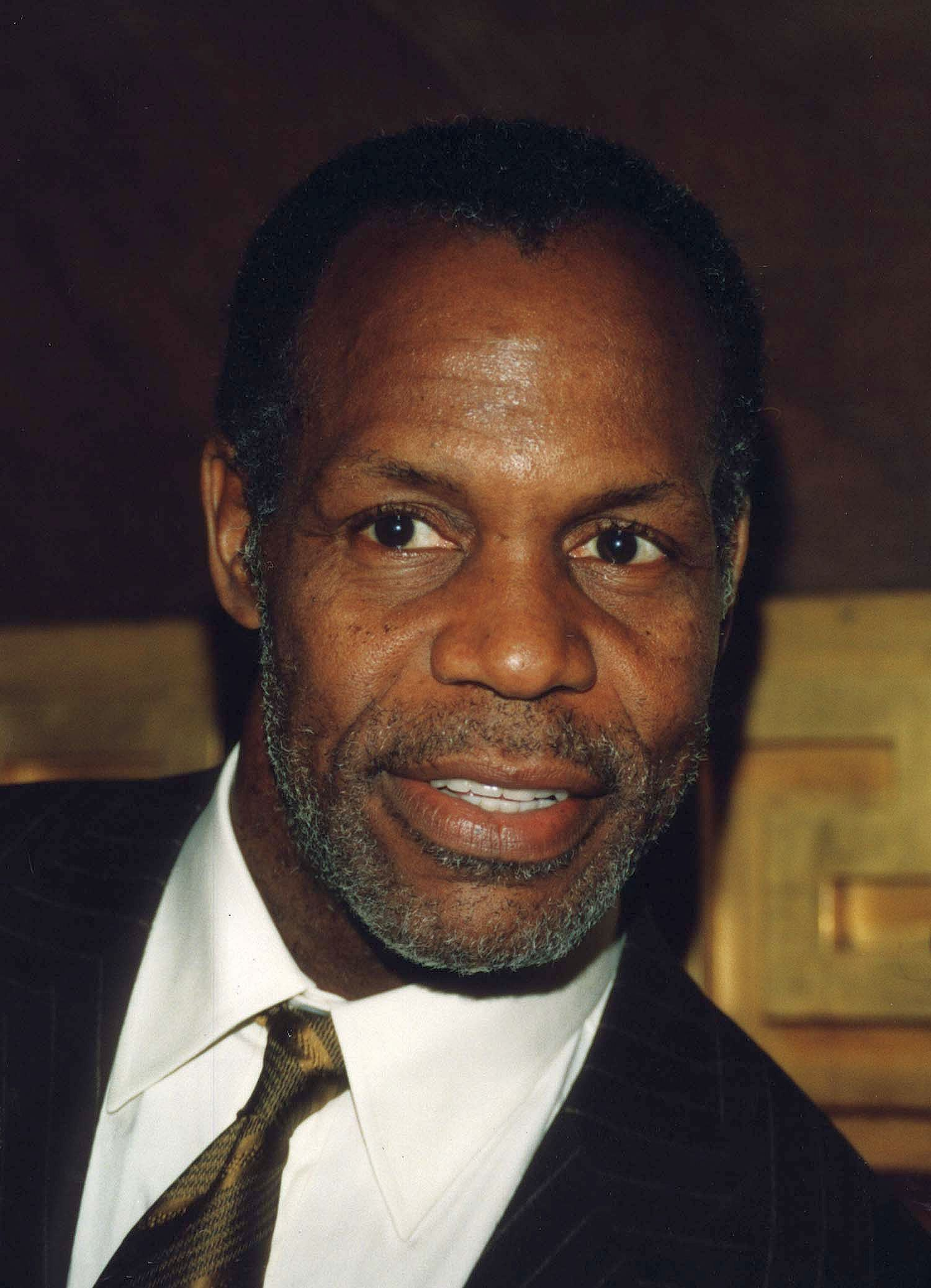
Danny Glover, Best Male Lead winner

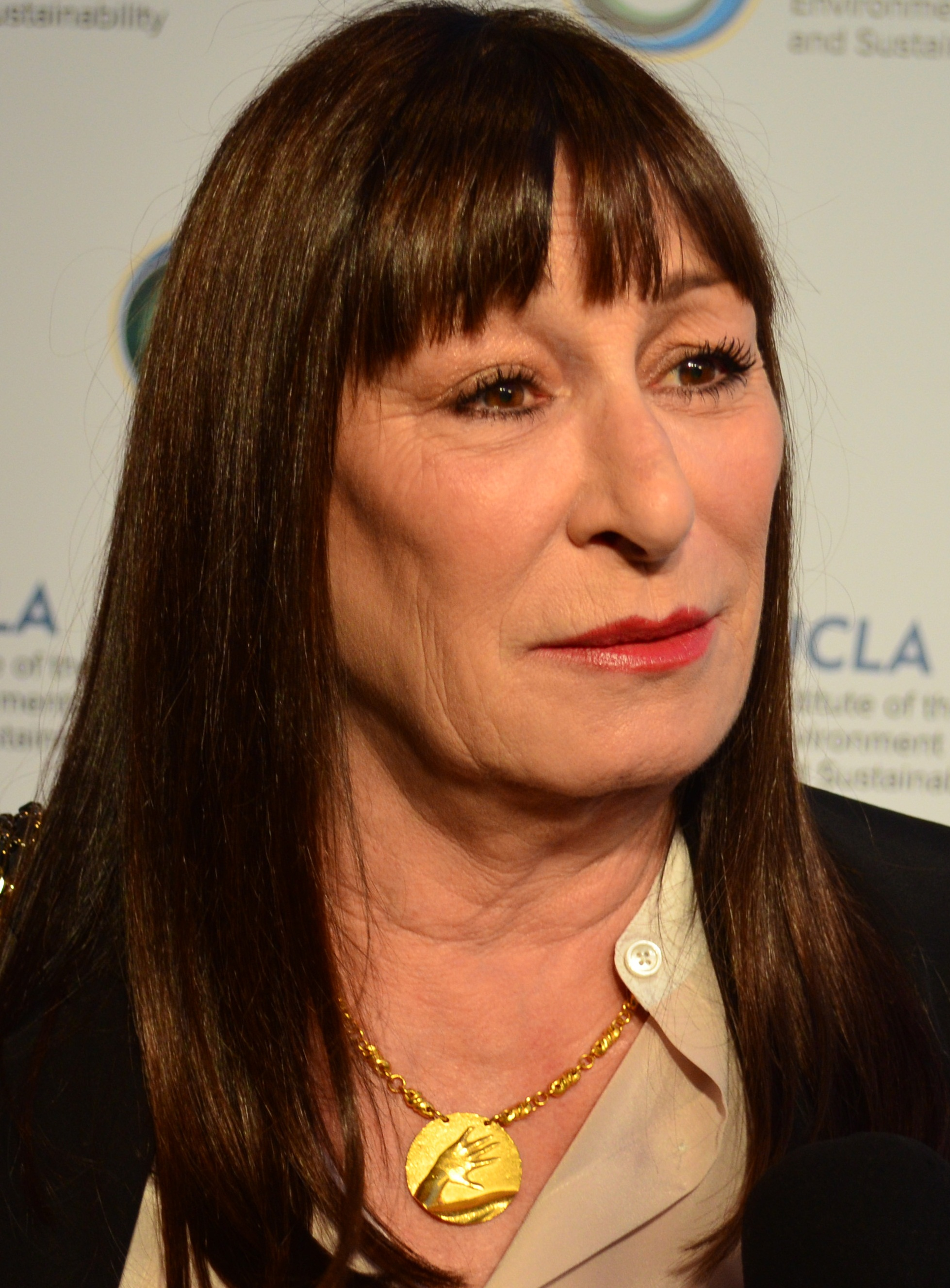
Anjelica Huston, Best Female Lead winner

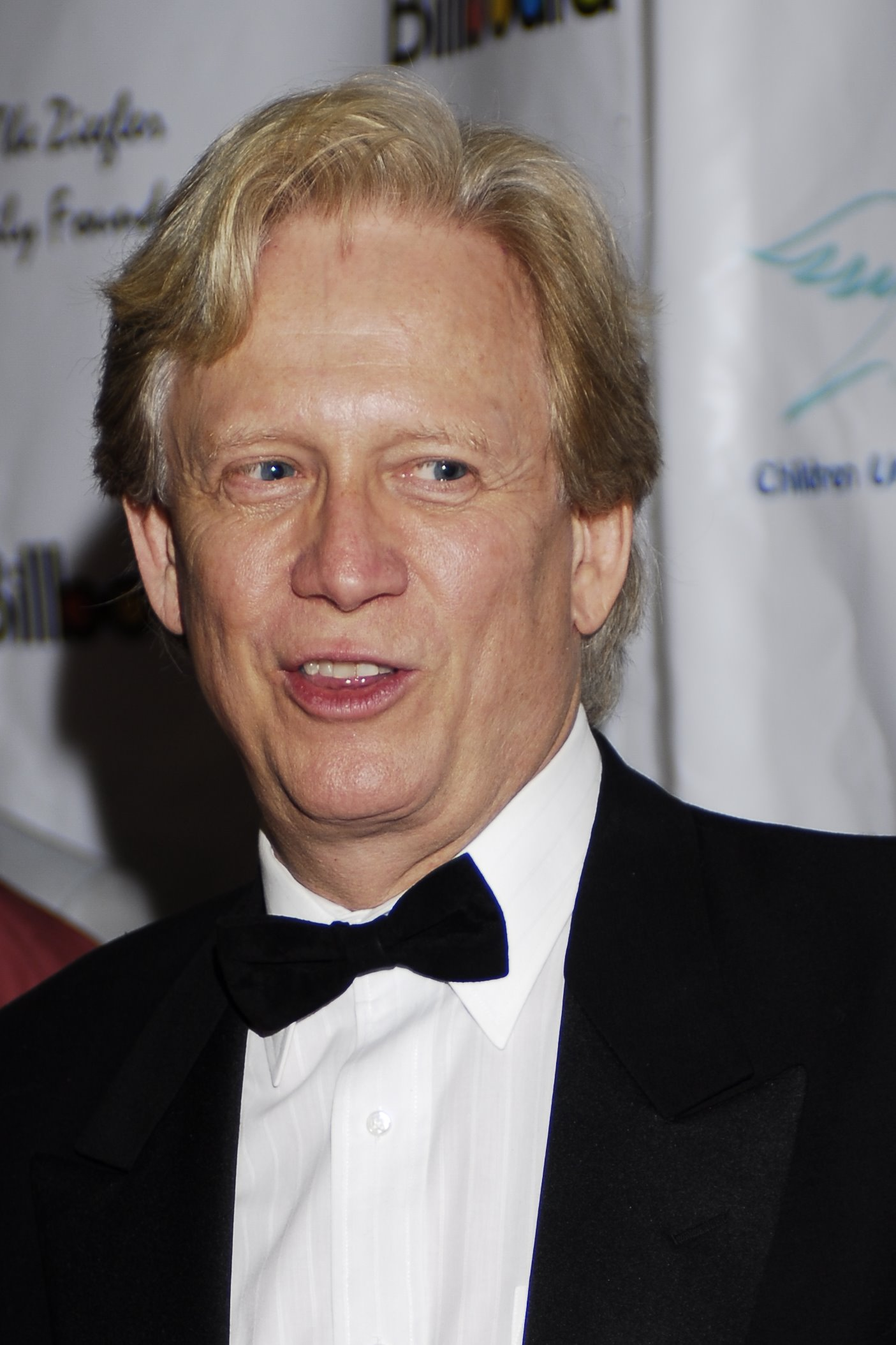
Bruce Davison, Best Supporting Male winner

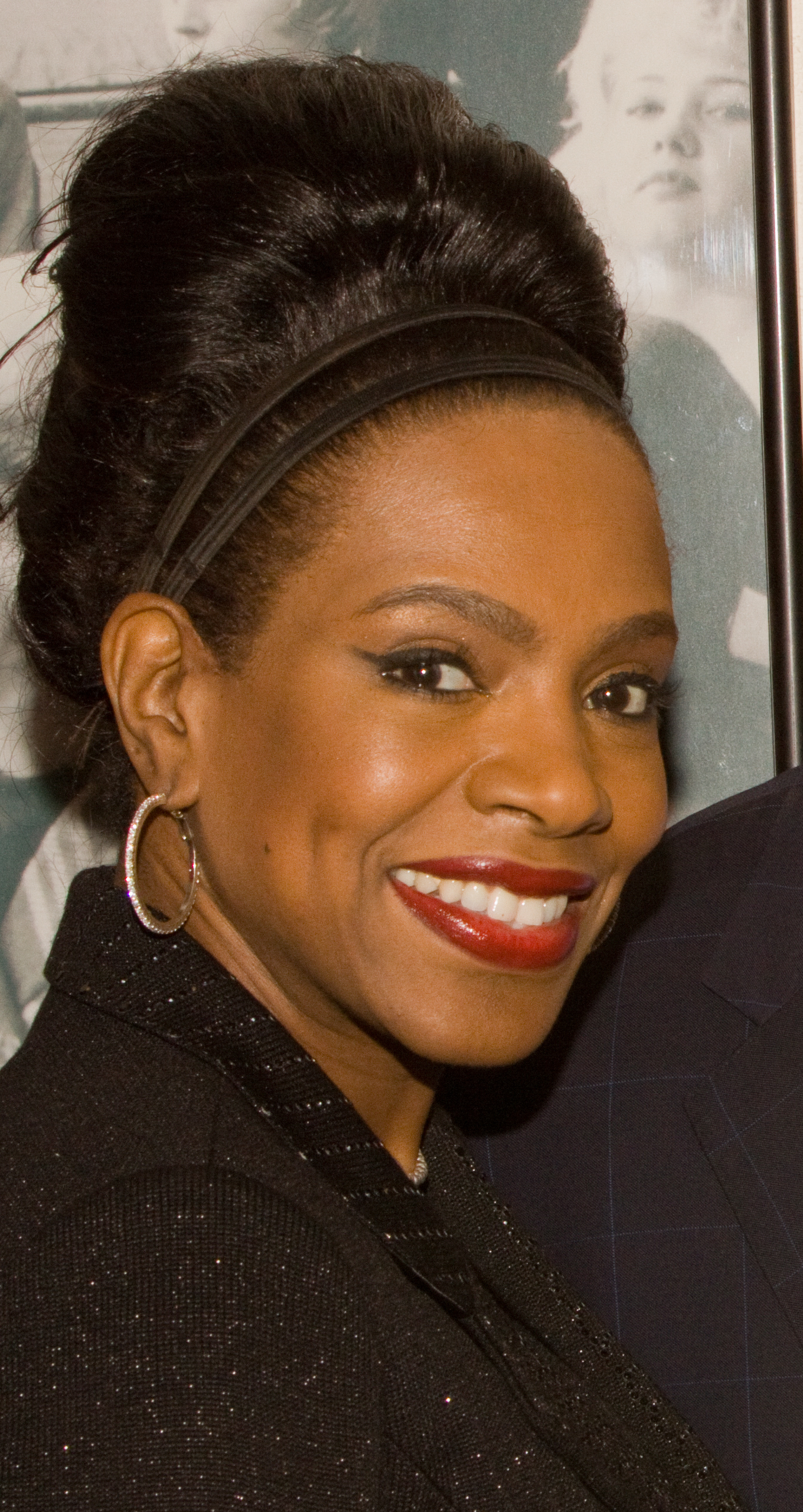
Sheryl Lee Ralph, Best Supporting Female winner

Best Feature	Best Director
The Grifters: Henry: Portrait of a Serial Killer; The Plot Against Harry; Pump Up the Volume; To Sleep with Anger	Charles Burnett – To Sleep with Anger: Reginald Hudlin – House Party; John McNaughton – Henry: Portrait of a Serial Killer; Allan Moyle – Pump Up the Volume; Michael Roemer – The Plot Against Harry
Best Male Lead	Best Female Lead
Danny Glover – To Sleep with Anger: Martin Priest – The Plot Against Harry; Christopher Reid – House Party; Michael Rooker – Henry: Portrait of a Serial Killer; Christian Slater – Pump Up the Volume	Anjelica Huston – The Grifters: Mary Alice – To Sleep with Anger; Eszter Balint – Bail Jumper; Carolyn Farina – Metropolitan; Joanne Woodward – Mr. & Mrs. Bridge
Best Supporting Male	Best Supporting Female
Bruce Davison – Longtime Companion: Willem Dafoe – Wild at Heart; Robin Harris – House Party; Ben Lang – The Plot Against Harry; Tom Towles – Henry: Portrait of a Serial Killer	Sheryl Lee Ralph – To Sleep with Anger: Tracy Arnold – Henry: Portrait of a Serial Killer; Ethel Ayler – To Sleep with Anger; Tisha Campbell – House Party; A.J. Johnson – House Party
Best Screenplay	Best First Feature
To Sleep with Anger – Charles Burnett: Henry: Portrait of a Serial Killer – John McNaughton and Richard Fire; Metropolitan – Whit Stillman; The Plot Against Harry – Michael Roemer; Pump Up the Volume – Allan Moyle	Metropolitan – Whit Stillman: House Party – Reginald Hudlin and Warrington Hudlin; Lightning Over Braddock: A Rustbowl Fantasy – Tony Buba; The Natural History of Parking Lots – Everett Lewis and Aziz Ghazal; Twister – Michael Almereyda and Wieland Schulz-Keil
Best Cinematography	Best Foreign Film
Wild at Heart – Frederick Elmes: House Party – Peter Deming; King of New York – Bojan Bazelli; Life Is Cheap... But Toilet Paper Is Expensive – Amir Mokri; The Plot Against Harry – Robert M. Young	Sweetie • Australia: Black Rain • Japan; A City of Sadness • Taiwan; The Cook, the Thief, His Wife & Her Lover • France/Netherlands/UK; Freeze, Die, Come to Life • Soviet Union

=== Films with multiple nominations and awards ===
==== Films that received multiple nominations ====
Nominations	Film
7	House Party
7	To Sleep with Anger
6	Henry: Portrait of a Serial Killer
6	The Plot Against Harry
4	Pump Up the Volume
3	Metropolitan
2	The Grifters
2	Wild at Heart

==== Films that won multiple awards ====
Awards	Film
4	To Sleep with Anger
2	The Grifters

== Special awards ==
=== Friend of Independents Award ===
- Eastman Kodak Co.
- Sovereign Pictures, Inc.

=== John Cassavetes Award ===
- Jon Jost
- Edward R. Pressman

=== Special Distinction Award ===
- Kevin Costner and Jim Wilson – Dances with Wolves
