= Elizabeth Franz =

American stage and television actress (1941–2025)

- Born: Elizabeth Jean Frankovitch; June 18, 1941; Akron, Ohio, U.S.
- Died: November 4, 2025 (aged 84); Woodbury, Connecticut, U.S.
- Occupation: Actress
- Years active: 1962-2017
- Spouses: Edward Binns (m. 1983; died 1990); Christopher Pelham

Elizabeth Jean Frankovitch (June 18, 1941 – November 4, 2025), known professionally as Elizabeth Franz, was an American stage and television actress.

== Early life ==
Franz was born Elizabeth Jean Frankovitch in Akron, Ohio, on July 18, 1941. Her father, Joseph Frankovitch, worked in a tire factory. Her half Irish, half Native American mother, Harriet, had mental problems that sometimes frightened Franz when she was a child. In childhood she decided to become an actress as a way of releasing emotions that she had to hold in while dealing with her parents. She had two brothers and a sister, and she graduated from Copley High School in Copley Township, Ohio, in 1959.

Although her mother never thought Franz would succeed as an actress, she wanted to attend the American Academy of Dramatic Arts (AADA) and worked as a secretary at Ohio Edison to save enough money to enroll there. An AADA teacher warned her that despite being a good actress, she might not get roles before she reached age 40.

== Life and career ==
Billed as Betty Frankovitch, Franz acted at the Weathervane Theater in Akron. She acted with The Repertory Theatre of St. Louis 1968–1970.

In 2004–05, she appeared at the Royal National Theatre in London, in the Sam Shepard play Buried Child. She starred in numerous Off-Broadway and regional theater productions, including the American premiere of Frank McGuinness's Bird Sanctuary. She also appeared in Long Day's Journey into Night, The Glass Menagerie, The Comedy of Errors, Madwoman of Chaillot, The Lion in Winter, A View from the Bridge, The Matchmaker, The Wizard of Oz, Great Expectations, The Model Apartment, and Woman in Mind.

Her "subtly layered performance" as Grandma Kurnitz in the 2017 Weston Playhouse Theatre Company production of Neil Simon's Lost in Yonkers was duly noted by Rutland Herald critic Jim Lowe, who deemed Franz's portrayal the "dramatic backbone" of the production, "allowing only traces of the octogenarian's love and humanity to seep through."

Franz's Tony-winning performance as Linda Loman in the 50th anniversary production of Arthur Miller's Death of a Salesman proved a revelation to audiences and author alike, as evidenced by Miller's brief but pointed tribute.

She has discovered in the role the basic underlying powerful protectiveness, which comes out as fury, and that in the past, in every performance that I know of, was simply washed out.

On television, Franz was most notably a character actor. She became best known for her role as the villainous Alma Rudder on Another World, which she portrayed from 1982–83, while she was performing Brighton Beach Memoirs on Broadway. She played Helen Wendall on As the World Turns from 1994–95, and appeared as free-spirited beauty salon owner Marsha in three episodes of Roseanne.

She appeared in the series Gilmore Girls, as the inn owner, Mia, and in Law & Order, Law & Order: Special Victims Unit, Cold Case, Dear John, and Judging Amy.

Franz appeared in such feature films and motion pictures as Sabrina, Christmas with the Kranks, The Substance of Fire, The Pallbearer, Thinner, The Secret of My Success, School Ties, and Jacknife.

== Personal life and death ==
Franz married actor Edward Binns in 1983, and they remained wed until his death in 1990. She died from cancer at her home in Woodbury, Connecticut on November 4, 2025, at the age of 84. At the time of her death, she was married to Christopher Pelham.

== Filmography ==
=== Film ===
Year	Title	Role	Notes
1980	Pilgrim, Farewell	Doctor	
1987	The Secret of My Success	Grace Foster	
1989	Jacknife	Pru Buckman	
1992	School Ties	Jane Dillon	
1993	It's Nothing Personal	Unknown	
1995	Sabrina	Joanna	
1996	The Pallbearer	Aunt Lucille	
1996	The Substance of Fire	Miss Barzakian	
1996	Thinner	Leda Rossington	
1996	Twisted	Mrs. Bundrass	
1999	A Fish in the Bathtub	Bea Greenberg	
2004	Christmas with the Kranks	Bev Scheel	
2004	Loopy	Doris Highsmith	Short Film
2005	The Reader	Sissel	Short Film
2009	In Memoriam	Woman	Short Film
2009	Alone	Sarah	Short Film
2015	Take Me to the River	Evelyn	

=== Television ===
Year	Title	Role	Notes
1981	The House of Mirth	Grace Stepney	TV movie
1982	American Playhouse	Doctor	Episode: "Pilgrim, Farewell"
1982	Another World	Alma Rudder	Episode: "July 30, 1982"
1985	Spenser: For Hire	Mrs. O'Rourke	Episode: "Original Sin"
1986	American Playhouse	Mrs. Rice	Episode: "The Rise and Rise and Daniel Rocket"
1987	The Equalizer	Mrs. Thomas	Episode: "Blood and Wine"
1987	American Playhouse	Dottie McCann	Episode: "Dottie"
1989	ABC Afterschool Special	Cecile Nelson	Episode: "A Town's Revenge"
1989	American Playhouse	Unknown	Episode: "Love and Other Sorrows"
1990	Roseanne	Marsha	3 episodes
1991	Face of a Stranger		TV movie
1993	Shameful Secrets	Maryanne's Mother	TV movie
1994–1995	Sisters	Gladys Lear	2 episodes
1995	ABC Afterschool Special	Alice Kelly	Episode: "Notes for My Daughter"
2000	Death of a Salesman	Linda Loman	TV movie
2000–2001	Judging Amy	Vivian Galloway	2 episodes
2001	A Girl Thing	Josephine McCormack	TV movie
2001	Gilmore Girls	Mia	Episode: "The Ins and Outs of Inns"
2003	Cold Case	Evelyn Shelby	Episode: "Look Again" (S1.E1)
2003	An Unexpected Love	Dorothy	TV movie
2004	Law & Order	Alison Bishop	Episode: "Married with Children"
2004	Law & Order: Special Victims Unit	Jeannette Henley	Episode: "Scavenger" (S6.E4)
2011	Homeland	Isabel Samler	Episode: "Marine One"
2012	Grey's Anatomy	Emma Carroll	Episode: "The Lion Sleeps Tonight"

=== Theatre ===
Year	Title	Role	Notes
1960	Rosencrantz and Guildenstern Are Dead	Ambassador/Soldier	Alvin Theatre, Broadway
1967	The Death of the Well-Loved Boy	The Daughter	St. Marks Playhouse, Off-Broadway
1975	Augusta	Perfromer	Playwrights Horizons, Off-Broadway
1975	Long Day's Journey Into Night	Mary Tyrone	Indiana Repertory Theatre
1977	The Cherry Orchard	Sharlotta Ivanovna	Vivian Beaumont Theater, Broadway
1981	Sister Mary Ignatius Explains It All For You	Sister Mary	Playwrights Horizons, Off-Broadway
1981	A View From the Bridge	Beatrice Carbone	Berkshire Theatre Festival
1983	Brighton Beach Memoirs	Kate Jerome	Alvin Theatre, Broadway
1985	The Octette Bridge Club	Nora	Music Box Theatre, Broadway
1985	Children of the Sun	Yelena	Mirror Repertory Company, Off-Broadway
1986	Broadway Bound	Kate (Replacement)	Broadhurst Theatre, Broadway
1990	The Cemetery Club	Ida	Brooks Atkinson Theatre, Broadway
1991	Getting Married	Mrs. Bridgenorth	Circle in the Square Theatre, Broadway
1992	The Wizard of Oz	The Wicked Witch of the West	Paper Mill Playhouse
1992	Great Expectations	Miss Havisham	Paper Mill Playhouse
1993	The Madwoman of Chaillot	Mlle. Gabrielle	Williamstown Theatre Festival
1993	The Lion in Winter	Eleanor of Aquitaine	Cleveland Playhouse
1994	The Matchmaker	Mrs. Dolly Levi	McCarter Theatre
1995	Uncle Vanya	Maria Vasilyevna Voinitskaya	Circle in the Square Theatre, Broadway
1997	Minutes from the Blue Route	Mother	Atlantic Theater Company, Off-Broadway
1997	Woman in Mind	Susan	Berkshire Theatre Festival
1998	The Cripple of Inishmaan	Kate	The Public Theater, Off-Broadway
1999	Death of a Salesman	Linda Loman	Eugene O'Neill Theatre, Broadway
2000	Long Day's Journey Into Night	Mary Tyrone	Syracuse Stage
2001	The Model Apartment	Lola	Long Wharf Theatre
2002	Morning's at Seven	Aaronetta Gibbs	Lyceum Theatre, Broadway
2003	Such Small Hands	Cassandra/Lucy	Syracuse Stage
2004	Buried Child	Halie	Royal National Theatre
2005	Bird Sanctuary	Eleanor	Pittsburgh Public Theater
2006	Driving Miss Daisy	Daisy Werthan	Syracuse Stage
2007	Howard Katz	Ellie	Roundabout Theatre Company, Off-Broadway
2007	The Piano Teacher	Mrs. K	Vineyard Theatre, Off-Broadway
2007	The Autumn Garden	Mrs. Mary Ellis	Williamstown Theatre Festival
2010	The Miracle Worker	Aunt Ev	Circle in the Square Theatre, Broadway
2010	Fifth of July	Sally Friedman	Williamstown Theatre Festival
2015	A Month in the Country	Anna	Classic Stage Company, Off-Broadway
2017	Lost in Yonkers	Grandma Kurnitz	Westport Country Playhouse

== Awards and nominations ==
Year	Association	Category	Nominated work	Result
1982	Drama Desk Awards	Outstanding Actress in a Play	Sister Mary Ignatius Explains It All for You	Nominated
1982	Obie Awards	Obie Award for Performance	Sister Mary Ignatius Explains It All For You	Won
1983	Tony Awards	Best Featured Actress in a Play	Brighton Beach Memoirs	Nominated
1990	Daytime Emmy Awards	Outstanding Performer in a Children's Special	ABC Afterschool Special	Nominated
1999	Joseph Jefferson Awards	Actress in a Supporting Role in a Play	Death of a Salesman	Won
1999	Drama Desk Awards	Outstanding Actress in a Play	Death of a Salesman	Nominated
1999	Tony Awards	Best Featured Actress in a Play	Death of a Salesman	Won
2000	Primetime Emmy Awards	Outstanding Supporting Actress in a Miniseries or a Movie	Death of a Salesman	Nominated
2001	Screen Actors Guild Awards	Outstanding Performance by a Female Actor in a Miniseries or Television Movie	Death of a Salesman	Nominated
2001	Elliot Norton Awards	Outstanding Actress, Large Company	Death of a Salesman	Won
2001	Los Angeles Stage Alliance Ovation Awards	Lead Actress in a Play	Death of a Salesman	Won
2002	Drama Desk Awards	Outstanding Featured Actress in a Play	Morning's at Seven	Nominated
2002	Tony Awards	Best Featured Actress in a Play	Morning's at Seven	Nominated
2008	Lucille Lortel Awards	Outstanding Lead Actress	The Piano Teacher	Won

== Sources ==
- Isherwood, Charles (November 19, 2007). "In a Quiet Suburb, a Quiet Life Darkened", New York Times
