= Pilgrim, Farewell =

1980 drama film

- Directed by: Michael Roemer
- Screenplay by: Michael Roemer
- Produced by: Stanley Plotnick
- Starring: Elizabeth Huddle; Christopher Lloyd
- Cinematography: Franz Rath
- Edited by: Terry Lewis
- Release date: 1980
- Language: English

Pilgrim, Farewell is a 1980 American independent drama film written and directed by Michael Roemer. It premiered at the 37th Venice International Film Festival.

== Cast ==
- Elizabeth Huddle as Kate
- Christopher Lloyd as Paul
- Laurie Prange as Ann
- Leslie Paxton as Rebecca
- Shelley Wyant as Maggie
- Elizabeth Franz as Doctor
- Robert Curtis Brown as Luke

== Production ==
Roemer conceived the film as a reaction to a production house employee who claimed he didn't know how to write; he structured it with a restricted cast and setting so that he could ultimately finance it independently, without relying on producers. The writing process took about one year and a half, and the film was shot in Post Mills, Vermont. It had a budget of about $600,000.

== Release ==
The film premiered at the 37th edition of the Venice Film Festival, in the Officina Veneziana sidebar. After being screened in several other festivals, it was broadcast by PBS on March 20, 1982, as part of the American Playhouse anthology series. In 2025, it received a limited theatrical release.

== Reception ==
A contemporary Variety review described the film as one that "does not quite achieve the poignance, dramatic epiphany and fresher insight into the painful situation it strives for", even if being "well produced" and possessing "obvious sincerity". The New York Times critic John J. O'Connor called it "a very nasty little film" and noted it "has powerful moments, but it is almost unrelievedly grim, at times as exasperating as the plight of its characters".
