= Nothing but a Man =

1964 film by Michael Roemer

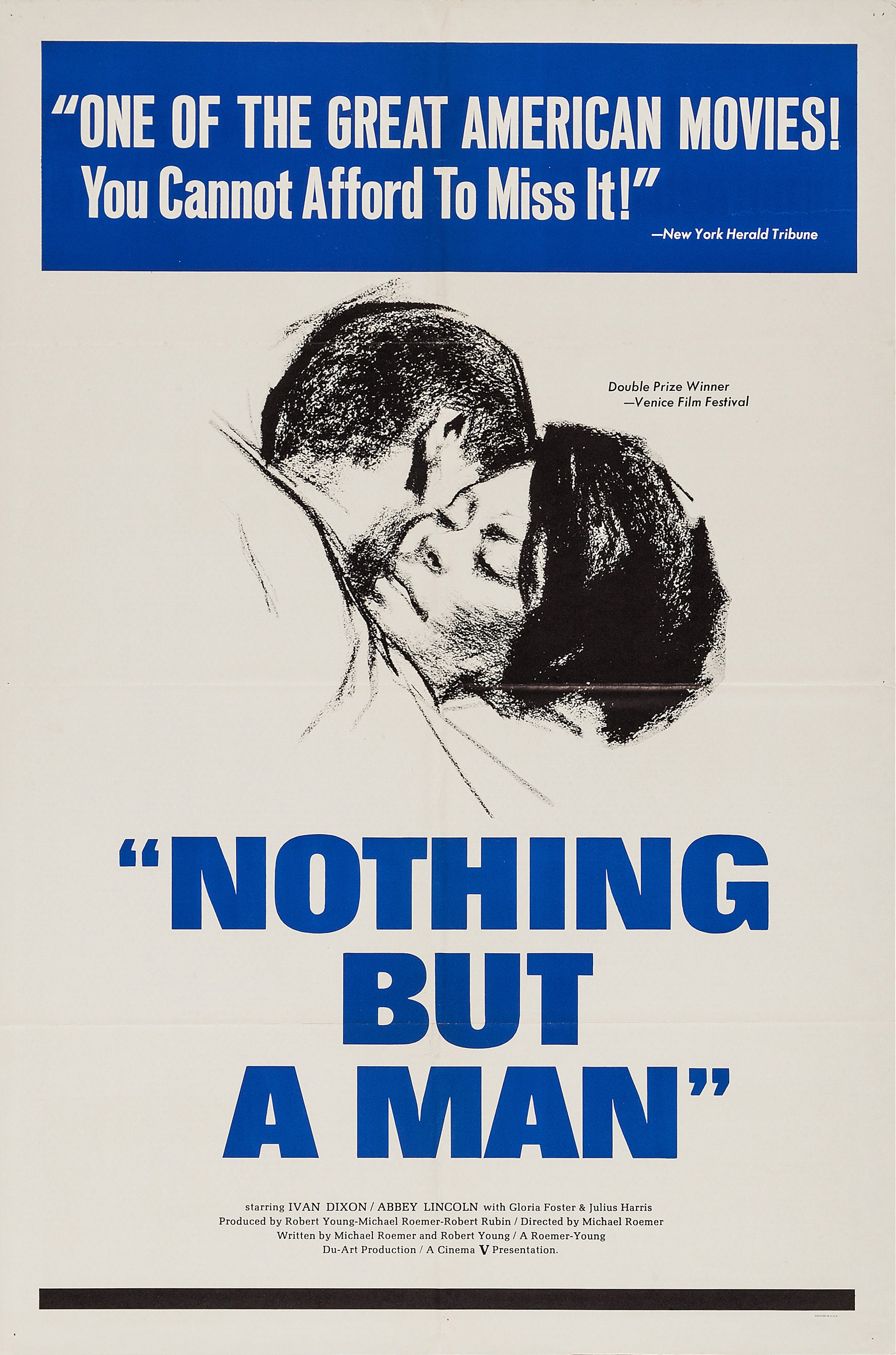
- Theatrical release poster
- Directed by: Michael Roemer
- Written by: Michael Roemer; Robert M. Young
- Produced by: Michael Roemer; Robert M. Young; Robert Rubin
- Starring: Ivan Dixon; Abbey Lincoln; Gloria Foster; Julius Harris
- Cinematography: Robert M. Young
- Distributed by: Cinema V
- Release date: September 19, 1964 (New York Film Festival)
- Running time: 95 minutes
- Country: United States
- Language: English
- Budget: $300,000

Nothing but a Man is a 1964 American independent drama film starring Ivan Dixon and Abbey Lincoln, and directed by Michael Roemer, who also co-wrote the film with Robert M. Young. The film tells the story of Duff Anderson, an African-American railroad worker who tries to maintain his dignity in a small racist town near Birmingham, Alabama, after he marries the local preacher's daughter. In addition to dealing with oppression and discrimination, Anderson must also come to terms with his troubled relationship with his own father, a drunk who abandoned and rejected him.

Although it was not widely seen upon release due to difficulties in finding distribution, the film is now generally considered to be an important example of neorealistic American cinema. In 1993, it was selected for preservation in the United States National Film Registry by the Library of Congress as being "culturally, historically, or aesthetically significant".

== Plot ==
Duff Anderson works on a railroad section gang near Birmingham, Alabama, earning a good wage and living an itinerant life with his black co-workers. On their night off, while the other men drink and visit a pool hall, Duff decides to walk into the nearby small town, and ends up at a church meeting featuring good food and lively gospel music. There, Duff meets the pretty and gentle schoolteacher Josie, the daughter of Preacher Dawson. They begin to date against the wishes of Josie's father and stepmother, who think the relatively uneducated, non-religious, and (to them) arrogant Duff is not good enough for Josie. Despite her parents' objections, Josie continues to see Duff, partly because Duff shows himself willing to resist and challenge the social conventions that oppress black people, rather than just accepting the status quo in order to get along with white people, as Josie's father has done.

Initially, Duff is just looking for a sexual relationship and tells Josie he doesn't want to get married. But after Duff visits his four-year-old illegitimate son in the care of an unloving, indifferent stepmother, and his emotionally abusive, hardly functioning drunken father, Will, living off his girlfriend, Lee, Duff realizes that he prefers the stability of a family to the life of a drifter. Duff and Josie marry with bright hopes for the future but then begin to face a series of challenges as a married couple.

Duff quits the section gang and takes a lower paying job at the local sawmill in order to have a stable home life. Being on the move had given Duff the illusion of freedom, but living in the town makes Duff subject to the town's social rules, and he immediately starts to have problems. Unlike his peers, Duff refuses to pretend to be friendly to white people who treat him obnoxiously or patronize him. Duff tries to encourage his black co-workers at the mill to stick together and stand up for their rights, but one of them informs on him to the white mill bosses, who suspect him of being a union organizer and troublemaker. After Duff refuses to follow his white boss's order to retract his statements to the other men, Duff is fired, and subsequently finds himself blacklisted at other area mills. Despite diligently searching for work, he is unable to find another job that is not humiliating and that also pays enough to support his family, now including a baby on the way.

Duff hates his preacher father-in-law, whom he sees as having sold out to the white people in return for social status and economic gain, and he hurtfully says to his wife, "You've never really been a nigger, living with them, in that house." Nevertheless, out of concern for Josie, Preacher Dawson uses his connections in the town to get Duff a job at a white-owned gas station. Soon, white customers who find Duff too proud for a black "boy" threaten to cause trouble if the boss keeps him on, and he loses that job as well. Although Josie is understanding, Duff, under emotional pressure and in a rage, shoves his pregnant wife to the floor when she tries to comfort him. Duff packs his bag and leaves their house, telling Josie that he will write her when he is on his feet again.

Duff storms off to his father, and finds him so inebriated that he dies as Duff and Lee are driving him to the hospital. Neither Duff nor Lee know where Duff's father was born or how old he was, and the only possessions he has handed down to Duff are the contents of his pockets. Duff decides to return home with his young son, whom Josie had been wanting to adopt. Duff and Josie tearfully embrace as he reassures her that it "ain't gonna be easy, baby, but it's going to be alright. Baby, I feel so free inside”.

== Cast ==
- Ivan Dixon as Duff Anderson
- Abbey Lincoln as Josie Dawson
- Yaphet Kotto as Jocko
- Leonard Parker as Frankie
- Stanley Green as Reverend Dawson
- Eugene Wood as Johnson
- Helen Lounck as Effie Simms
- Julius Harris as Will Anderson, Duff's father
- Gloria Foster as Lee
- Gertrude Jeannette as Mrs. Dawson
- Tom Ligon as Teenager
- William Jordan as Teenager

== Production ==
The screenplay was written by Robert M. Young and Michael Roemer, who drew on his own background as a Jew persecuted by Nazis. Roemer had fled Nazi Germany as an 11-year-old child on the Kindertransports. Before starting to write, Roemer and Young went on a quest to understand and get to know the African-American culture of the South. They “left on an Underground Railway in reverse”. As liberal Jews in the South, they were treated by whites as pariahs and warned that their food might be poisoned, causing them to relate strongly to the black families whom they met. They allowed themselves to be passed on from one family and community to the next so they could learn as much as possible about the relationships and experiences. One morning in Mississippi, the plot of a young couple's struggles and the man's relationship with his father came to Roemer, and the script was written in six weeks as soon as they were back in New York City.

Although the script was written quickly, casting took several months. Charles Gordone was responsible for introducing the writers to some of the main talent, including Broadway actor Ivan Dixon, who went on to play the role of Staff Sergeant James Kinchloe on the CBS-TV sitcom Hogan's Heroes, and jazz great Abbey Lincoln. Julius Harris made his acting debut in the film playing Duff's father. Harris was a nurse before he was cast, but had always wanted to act. Yaphet Kotto also had his first credited movie role in the film, playing a railroad worker. Both Harris and Kotto went on to appear in many more films and television programs over the next four decades.

At the last minute, the film's title was almost changed to Duff Anderson.

== Reception ==
Nothing but a Man premiered at Philharmonic Hall and had a limited run in a few cities, receiving rave reviews at the New York Film Festival and winning a coveted prize at the Venice Film Festival. However, according to Roger Ebert, the film's release was "spotty" and little money was available for its promotion. The film was mostly shown at theaters specializing in independent and foreign films. Ebert has suggested that it failed to find a wider audience because it did not "[employ] the easy liberal pieties of its period in an attempt to reassure white audiences that all stories have happy endings." As a result, the film became, in Ebert's words, "more famous than familiar" and as of the early 1990s, few people had seen it. In 1993, a restored print of the film was nationally re-released, bringing it to the attention of a wider audience. It was released on DVD in 2004.

As of 2026, Nothing but a Man has a 98% fresh rating on the review aggregator Rotten Tomatoes from 49 reviews, with the critics consensus, "With calm confidence and a strikingly naturalistic approach, Nothing but a Man tells a quietly powerful story of Black American lives." A Washington Post review at the time of the film's 1993 re-release called it "one of the most sensitive films about black life ever made in this country". Ivan Dixon's performance in the film has been called the best of his career.

== Honors and awards ==
In 1964, Nothing but a Man won the San Giorgio Prize at the Venice Film Festival, awarded to films considered especially important for the progress of civilization. The film was added to the National Film Registry of the Library of Congress in 1993.

== Soundtrack ==
The soundtrack to the film was put together by Wilbur Kirk. It uses many contemporary hit songs released by Motown Records; it was the label's first original soundtrack recording. Motown released an original soundtrack album for the film on CD in 1996.

Track Listing

1. "(Love Is Like A) Heat Wave" – Martha & The Vandellas
2. "Fingertips (Pt. II)" – Little Stevie Wonder
3. "That's the Way I Feel" – The Miracles
4. "Come on Home" – Holland & Dozier
5. "This Is When I Need You Most" – Martha & The Vandellas
6. "I'll Try Something New" – The Miracles
7. "Way Over There" – The Marvelettes
8. "Mickey's Monkey" – The Miracles
9. "You Beat Me to the Punch" – Mary Wells
10. "You've Really Got A Hold On Me" (live) – The Miracles
11. "Bye Bye Baby" (live) – Mary Wells

== Novelization ==
A novelization of the film by noted pulp crime writer Jim Thompson was published in 1970 by Popular Library.

== See also ==
- List of American films of 1964
- Civil rights movement
- R&B music
