= To Sleep with Anger =

1990 film by Charles Burnett

- Theatrical release poster
- Directed by: Charles Burnett
- Written by: Charles Burnett
- Produced by: Caldecot Chubb; Thomas S. Byrnes; Darin Scott
- Starring: Danny Glover; Paul Butler; Mary Alice; Carl Lumbly; Vonetta McGee; Richard Brooks; Sheryl Lee Ralph
- Cinematography: Walt Lloyd
- Edited by: Nancy Richardson
- Music by: Stephen James Taylor
- Distributed by: The Samuel Goldwyn Company
- Release date: October 12, 1990 (United States)
- Running time: 102 minutes
- Country: United States
- Language: English
- Budget: $1.5 million
- Box office: $1.1 million

To Sleep with Anger is a 1990 American black comedy film written and directed by Charles Burnett, and starring Danny Glover.

In 2017, the film was selected for preservation in the United States National Film Registry by the Library of Congress for being "culturally, historically, or aesthetically significant". It had a remastered home media release from the Criterion Collection on February 26, 2019.

== Plot ==
Gideon and his wife Suzie live in South Central Los Angeles (having moved there from the South years ago), where they spend time taking care of their grandson Sunny, as their son Samuel (also referred to as "Babe Brother") and his wife Linda each work during the day.

One day, Harry, a longstanding friend from the South whom they have not seen for many years, makes a surprise visit. The couple are delighted to see him and insist that he stay with them for as long as he wishes. Harry has a charming, down-home manner, but his enigmatic and somewhat amoral presence brings trouble to a crisis that has been simmering in the family—especially as regards Samuel and his relationships with his parents, wife and elder brother, Junior.

Harry's presence threatens to break up Samuel's marriage and seems to be related to an illness Gideon develops over the course of three weeks. On a stormy night, the clash between the two brothers, while Samuel merely sits and the others tend to Gideon, erupts in full; the result of their clash results in Suzie getting accidentally slashed in the hand that requires a visit to the hospital.

Seemingly, the internal struggle that Samuel went through seems to wash away. The illness to Gideon proves ultimately purgative, though Harry's precise role remains ambiguous. Harry, in the midst of getting his things, slips on marbles that were accidentally dropped by Sunny and suffers a heart attack that leaves him dead on the kitchen floor for days.

== Cast ==
- Danny Glover as Harry
- Paul Butler as Gideon
- Mary Alice as Suzie
- Carl Lumbly as Junior
- Vonetta McGee as Pat
- Richard Brooks as Babe Brother
- Sheryl Lee Ralph as Linda
- DeVaughn Nixon as Sunny
- Reina King as Rhonda
- Cory Curtis as Skip
- Paula Bellamy as Mrs. Baker
- Wonderful Smith as Preacher
- Ethel Ayler as Hattie
- Beverly Mickins as Neighbor
- Jimmy Witherspoon as Percy
- Julius Harris as Herman

== Production ==
The genesis of the film came from director Charles Burnett's failure to make a film for PBS about a young girl killed by ironic events, believing that "Thinking that it’s not real, so if [PBS] had any kind of input it wouldn’t be so tragic. I started to write it, and sent them different stages of it. And they brought in the same people, wanting to make it into their movie. The things that were cultural or specific about it, they wanted to take out. They wanted to make it “for the mainstream, so that everyone can understand it.” I said “that’s not the story; the story has to do with folklore, and the Black experience.” So we got into this huge argument again. So what the Corporation for Public Broadcasting—CPB—did was: they’d pay you after they approved a draft. You'd get involved with them, you'd get dependent on that check coming in, and they’d keep quizzing you on those changes. “Have you made those changes?” And you'd realize that the moment you made those changes, the check would come in the mail. Otherwise, you don't get it. They don't say it that way, but it comes out that way. So that became very difficult, and finally I said “I can’t make the changes that you want me to make; it’s not about that.” So we parted company, and they wrote a really nasty letter saying that I'm not a writer, and things like that. It was really awful! Then, this guy Cotty Chubb—he had been a friend of Michael Tolkin, who did The Player—called me out of the blue and said, “I hear you might be working on something; I’d like to see what you’re doing; I’m a producer.” I said “I have this script that no one wants,” and he said, “Bring it down.” So I dropped it off in his office." By the end of the movie, it had twelve producers behind it.

== Reception ==
The film has received critical acclaim. On Rotten Tomatoes, To Sleep with Anger holds a rating of 93% from 105 reviews. The website's critical consensus reads: "To Sleep with Anger examines cultural tensions with a deft hand and a potent blend of comedy and drama, stirred skillfully to life by a strong cast led by Danny Glover."

Chuck Bowen of Slant Magazine called it a "neglected masterpiece of African-American cinema." IndieWire's Brandon Wilson has called it Burnett's "other masterpiece," as well as numerous other favorable comparisons to Killer of Sheep, saying "Like all great art, To Sleep With Anger triumphs because it works both on a personal level... and it is provocative enough thematically to fuel hours of discussion about tradition versus modernity and how it has affected African-Americans, for better or worse... [Burnett]'s asking us to think about the generation gap, Christian faith versus backwoods mysticism, the grip of the past versus the pull of the present, African-American yearning for financial prosperity versus our sense of altruism & duty and complications within both sides of each coin."

Roger Ebert gave it 2.5 out of 4 stars, and called it "too long" saying that "There are some good things in this movie, and too much time in between them". Entertainment Weekly's Owen Gleiberman called it "too ambitious" and said it "never finds a mood".

== Accolades ==
Year	Award	Category	Nominee(s)	Result	Ref.
1991	Chicago Film Critics Association Awards	Best Film		Nominated	
1991	Independent Spirit Awards	Best Feature	Caldecot Chubb, Thomas S. Byrnes and Darin Scott	Nominated	
1991	Independent Spirit Awards	Best Director	Charles Burnett	Won	
1991	Independent Spirit Awards	Best Screenplay	Charles Burnett	Won	
1991	Independent Spirit Awards	Best Male Lead	Danny Glover	Won	
1991	Independent Spirit Awards	Best Female Lead	Mary Alice	Nominated	
1991	Independent Spirit Awards	Best Supporting Female	Ethel Ayler	Nominated	
1991	Independent Spirit Awards	Best Supporting Female	Sheryl Lee Ralph	Won	
1992	NAACP Image Awards	Outstanding Motion Picture		Nominated	
1992	NAACP Image Awards	Outstanding Actor in a Motion Picture	Danny Glover	Nominated	
1992	NAACP Image Awards	Outstanding Actress in a Motion Picture	Mary Alice	Nominated	
1990	Los Angeles Film Critics Association Awards	Best Screenplay	Charles Burnett	Nominated	
1991	National Society of Film Critics Awards	Best Actor	Danny Glover	Nominated	
1991	National Society of Film Critics Awards	Best Screenplay	Charles Burnett	Won	
1990	New York Film Critics Circle Awards	Best Actor	Danny Glover	Nominated	
1990	New York Film Critics Circle Awards	Best Screenplay	Charles Burnett	Nominated	
1990	Sundance Film Festival	Grand Jury Prize	Charles Burnett	Nominated	
1990	Sundance Film Festival	Special Jury Recognition	Charles Burnett	Won	
