= Dying (1976 film) =

1976 film by Michael Roemer

- Directed by: Michael Roemer
- Cinematography: David Grubin
- Release date: 1976
- Running time: 80 minutes
- Country: United States
- Language: English

Dying is a 1976 documentary about death directed by Michael Roemer. The film depicts the lives of three people with terminal illnesses as they confront their imminent death. The film was originally broadcast on the public television network WNET (the PBS network in the New York area) in 1976. It was restored and released theatrically at the Film Forum in New York City on January 24, 2025.

== Narrative ==
The film follows the lives of three terminally ill people from the Boston area as they face death, documenting their lives and the lives of their loved ones. Forty-six year old Sally has brain cancer that she describes is growing like moss. One side of her body is paralyzed. She is being cared for in a hospital and receiving treatment. She laments her progressive decline and disability, stating she used to have an active life with many endeavors, including mountaineering. Her condition progresses and treatment is eventually withdrawn, she goes home to be cared for by her elderly mother and later dies.

Harriet and Bill are a married couple with two boys aged 8 and 10. Bill is dying of melanoma at age 33. Harriet is distraught about losing her husband and she is fearful about bringing up her family without him. She is hoping to quickly re-marry after Bill's death so her two sons can have a new father.

Reverend Bryant is a 56 year old preacher who has cancer that has spread to his liver. He explains that he was lonely growing up in the foster care system, but his life was renewed when he met his wife Kathleen and started a family with her. Bryant takes his wife and children on a trip to the American South to visit his ancestral home. The family visit a cemetery holding many of his relatives. Reverend Bryant died on January 23, 1975. His funeral is depicted, with his family, clergy and parishioners celebrating his life and dancing with the casket.

== Production ==
Roemer produced the documentary using a grant from the National Endowment for the Humanities. He followed the three dying people and their loved ones for about 2 years, documenting their lives.

== Reception ==
Writing for The New Yorker in 2025, film critic Richard Brody, regarding Roemer's observational filmmaking style in which he allowed the subjects to share their lives and feelings with minimal external narrative or effects, stated that the director "turns observation into unrelenting and harrowing emotional immediacy." Brody also stated that the segment detailing the anguish experienced by Harriet and Bill as they faced death was similar to the dramatic works of Nicholas Ray.

Contemporary reviews of the film were generally positive, with Judith Crist calling it "a brilliantly illuminating consideration of the experience that awaits us all." Time called it the year's most distinguished documentary and stated that the work is "the least common of television phenomena — a program that continues to reverberate in the mind." Writing for the New York Times, David Dempsey stated that Roemer, with his unobstructive directorial style and empathy for his subjects, has brought death to the forefront in contrast to how the subject is sanitized in the media. Dempsey explained that the filmmaker originally planned to include a segment explaining why death was being explored, why the sensitive subject was being moved from "the deep freeze into the living room" but this segment was later omitted. Dempsey stated that this lack of perspective detracted from the film, with Dempsey concluding that the film is an "unfinished exploration of subject that is only beginning to be seriously studied."
