= Michael Roemer =

American film director (1928–2025)

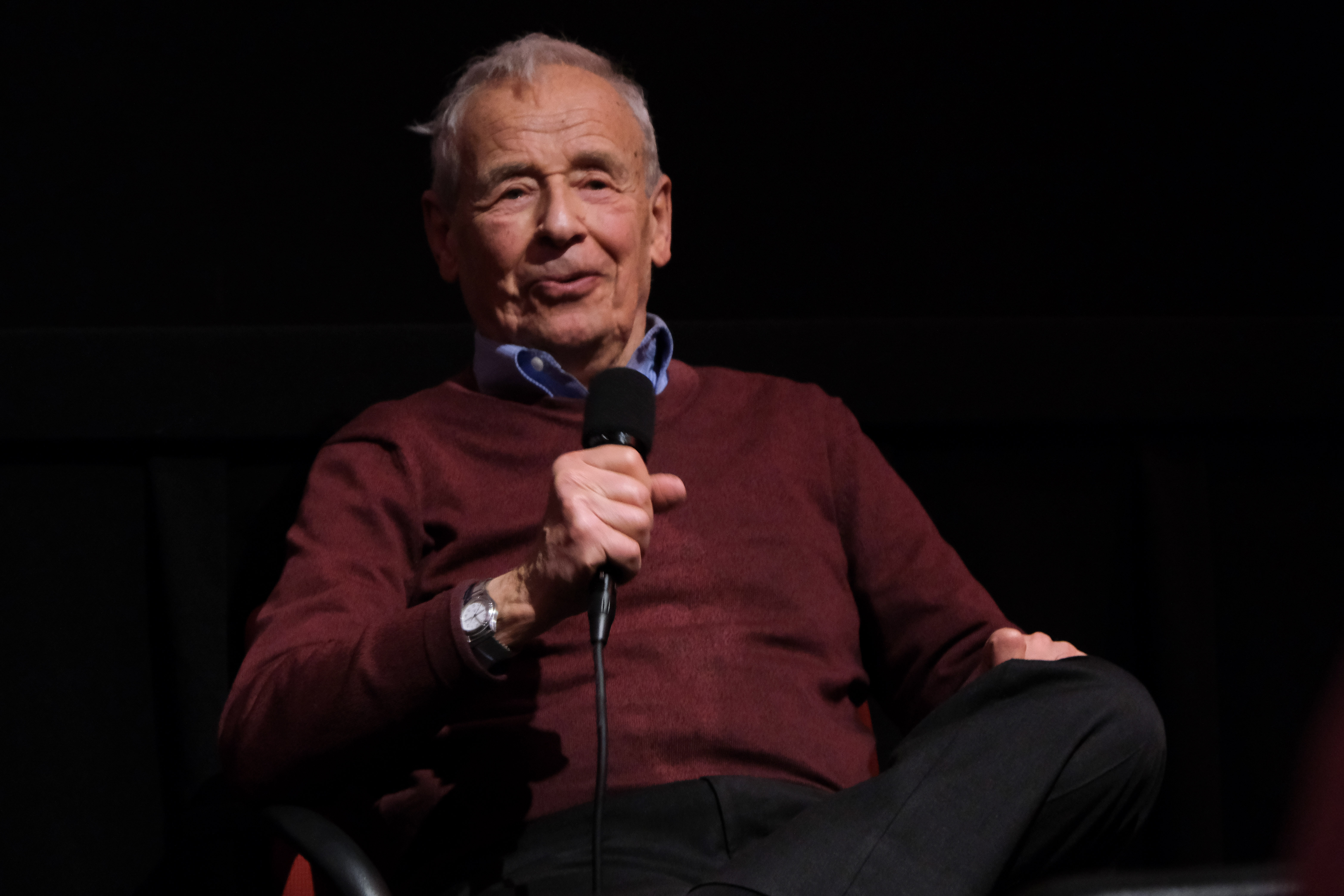
- Michael Roemer speaking at the Harvard Film Archive
- Born: January 1, 1928; Berlin, Brandenburg, Prussia, Germany
- Died: May 20, 2025 (aged 97); Townshend, Vermont, U.S.
- Education: Harvard University (A.B.)
- Occupations: Film director, producer, writer, professor
- Spouse: Barbara Balze (m. 1953; died 2007)
- Children: 3

Michael Roemer (January 1, 1928 – May 20, 2025) was a German-born American film director, producer and writer. He won several awards for his films, which include Nothing But a Man and The Plot Against Harry. He was the recipient of a Guggenheim Fellowship. A professor at Yale University for over 50 years, he was the author of Telling Stories.

== Early life ==
Roemer was born on January 1, 1928, to a well-to-do Jewish family in Berlin, Germany. After the Nazis came to power in 1933 and began restricting the rights of Jews to work, his father and his grandfather found themselves unable to work and provide for the family, and eventually lost everything. At the age of 11, Roemer was sent out of Germany on one of the Kindertransports. In England, he attended Bunce Court School, a German Jewish school for refugees, both pupils and staff. There, he met Wilhelm Marckwald, an actor and former director of the Deutsches Theater Berlin and also a refugee. The playwright Frank Marcus and the painter Frank Auerbach were two of his friends at Bunce Court. Roemer emigrated to the United States in 1945.

Roemer received his A.B. degree from Harvard University in 1949. While at Harvard, he directed his first film, A Touch of the Times, possibly the first feature film produced at an American college. After graduating, he worked for Louis de Rochemont for eight years as a production manager, film editor, and as an assistant director. He later wrote, produced and directed a series of educational films for the Ford Foundation.

== Independent filmmaker ==
His feature-length film, Nothing But a Man won two awards at the Venice Film Festival, as well as critical acclaim in France. It did not, however, do well in the United States until it was re-released in 1993. Writing the screenplay, Roemer drew on his own background as a Jew in Nazi Germany, where his family had everything taken away from them and his father and grandfather were unable to provide for the family because of the Nazis' increasingly restrictive laws concerning the rights of Jews. The movie's Motown soundtrack came about by chance. George Schiffer, a classmate of Roemer's at Harvard, had his law office around the corner from where Roemer was editing the film. Over lunch one day, Roemer told him about the movie and Schiffer suggested he listen to some music he had from a new client, a small record label just starting out in Detroit, Michigan. Roemer loved the music and acquired the rights from Motown owner Berry Gordy for $5,000. After the film was re-released, The Washington Post called it "one of the most sensitive films about black life ever made in this country", and in 1994 it was added to the National Film Registry of the Library of Congress.

Roemer's film The Plot Against Harry, a comedy, was made in 1969, but found no one to distribute it because no one found it funny. Twenty years later, he decided to put all of his movies on videotape as a gift to his children. Discovering that the technician who was making the transfer was laughing hard at the film, Roemer decided to make two 35 mm prints and submitted them to film festivals in New York and Toronto. Both festivals accepted the film and commercial distribution and acclaim followed. The film was nominated for six Independent Spirit Awards, and won the Rosa Camuna prize at the Bergamo Film Meeting in 1990.

Roemer began teaching at Yale University in 1966 and received a Guggenheim Fellowship in 1971. He retired in 2017.

Roemer made the 1976 documentary Dying which followed the lives of three people with terminal illnesses as they lived their final months and eventually died. The film explored the three peoples', and their loved ones', feelings and attitudes about death. The film was originally broadcast on PBS in 1976, and it was restored and released theatrically at the Film Forum in New York City in 2025. He then made two films for that network's American Playhouse series: Pilgrim, Farewell (1980) and Haunted (1984).

He was interviewed for Melissa Hacker's 1996 documentary about the Kindertransports, My Knees Were Jumping.

In 2022, Haunted was re-released theatrically under the title Vengeance is Mine, and received a similar reappraisal to the one received years earlier by The Plot Against Harry. Writing in the New York Times, critic Wesley Morris called it "an American movie executed with a French film’s interpersonal insouciance. It still feels original, in other words—one of those movies that somebody wrote and directed (Roemer, in this case) but that feels controlled entirely, engrossingly by human impulse, lawless in its way." In Screen Slate, A.S. Hamrah wrote that discovering a Roemer film as good as Nothing But a Man and The Plot Against Harry "is a cause for celebration, and something of a miracle."

== Personal life and death ==
In 1953, Roemer married educator Barbara Balze (died 2007), and they had three children. He died at his home in Townshend, Vermont, on May 20, 2025, at the age of 97.

== Books ==
- Telling Stories: Postmodernism and the Invalidation of Traditional Narrative (1997) University Press of America, Inc. ISBN 1-57309-035-2
- Film Stories, Vol. 1, Scarecrow Press (2001) ISBN 0-8108-3909-1
- Film Stories, Vol. 2, Scarecrow Press (2001) ISBN 978-0-8108-3911-3
- Shocked But Connected: Notes on Laughter, Rowman & Littlefield Publishers (2012) ISBN 978-1442217560

== Filmography (selected list) ==
- A Touch of the Times (1949)
- Cortile Cascino (1962) documentary
- Nothing But a Man (1964), co-produced with Robert M. Young and Robert Rubin, starring Ivan Dixon and Abbey Lincoln
- Faces of Israel (1967)
- The Plot Against Harry (1969), co-produced with Robert M. Young
- Dying (1976), documentary
- Pilgrim, Farewell (1980), starring Christopher Lloyd
- Vengeance Is Mine, originally titled Haunted (1984), starring Brooke Adams

== Television ==
- Pilgrim, Farewell (1980), with Christopher Lloyd
- Haunted (1984), with Brooke Adams; later known as Vengeance is Mine, an American Playhouse production
