= Pump Up the Volume (film) =

1990 film by Allan Moyle

- Theatrical release poster
- Directed by: Allan Moyle
- Written by: Allan Moyle
- Produced by: Syd Cappe; Sara Risher; Sandy Stern; Nicolas Stiliadis
- Starring: Christian Slater; Scott Paulin; Ellen Greene; Samantha Mathis
- Cinematography: Walt Lloyd
- Edited by: Larry Bock
- Music by: Cliff Martinez
- Distributed by: New Line Cinema
- Release date: August 22, 1990 (United States)
- Running time: 102 minutes
- Countries: United States; Canada
- Language: English
- Box office: $11.5 million (United States)

Pump Up the Volume is a 1990 coming-of-age teen drama film written and directed by Allan Moyle. The film stars Christian Slater, Scott Paulin, Ellen Greene, and Samantha Mathis.

Pump Up the Volume was released by New Line Cinema on August 22, 1990 in the United States. The film received positive reviews from critics and grossed $11.5 million in the United States.

== Plot ==
High school student Mark Hunter lives in a sleepy suburb of Phoenix, Arizona, and broadcasts an FM pirate radio station from his parents' basement, which functions as his sole outlet for his teenage angst and aggression. The station's theme song is "Everybody Knows" by Leonard Cohen and there are glimpses of cassettes by alternative musicians such as The Jesus and Mary Chain, Camper Van Beethoven, Primal Scream, Soundgarden, Ice-T, Bad Brains, Concrete Blonde, Henry Rollins, and Pixies. By day, Mark is a loner who has difficulty socializing. By night, under the nom de plume Happy Harry Hard-on or simply "Hard Harry", he expounds outsider views about problems with American society, expresses teen angst, and exposes the underhanded actions of the faculty. His audience grows from a handful of loyal listeners to the entire student body.

Depressed teenager Malcolm Kaiser writes to Harry seeking advice about committing suicide. Harry flippantly expresses disbelief that Malcolm is sincere, saying "Maybe you'll feel better tomorrow." The next day it is discovered that Malcolm committed suicide.

Fellow student Nora De Niro deduces that Mark is Hard Harry, and attempts to assuage the guilt he feels over Malcolm. The radio show becomes increasingly popular after Harry apologizes to Malcolm for not telling him not to follow through, and exhorts his listeners to confront their problems instead of surrendering to them through suicide. At the climax of his speech, overachieving student and consistent listener Paige Woodward jams her medals and accolades into a microwave, causing an explosion which injures her face.

Unrest at the school increases as students share bootleg tapes re-playing Harry's show. A meeting of faculty and parents concludes that the pirate DJ is responsible for the problems at the school. The police investigate, first cutting off Mark's access to his P.O. Box, and then cutting off the wireless phone that Mark had surreptitiously hooked up at a neighboring house. The FCC begins an investigation.

Mark decides to make a final broadcast. He installs his radio station in his mother's Jeep, creating a mobile transmitter so the FCC will have difficulty triangulating the radio signal. Nora drives while Mark broadcasts pursued by the police and the FCC.

Harry's broadcast is heard by the entire school who have gathered at the athletics field. Mark's father, school board commissioner Brian Hunter, confronts Principal Loretta Cresswood demanding to know why she systematically expelled students with low test scores. Cresswood insists they were losers and troublemakers and that she did it for the good of the school. Brian immediately suspends Cresswood.

The harmonizer Mark uses to disguise his voice breaks, and Mark decides to broadcast his final message as himself. The Jeep drives up to the crowd of students, and Mark tells them that the world belongs to them and that they should make their own future. He encourages them to "steal the air" and begin their own shows to put their thoughts and feelings out into the world. The police arrest Mark and Nora. As they are taken away, students shout their appreciation of "Harry". Mark turns to the students and tells them to "Talk hard!" As the film ends, the voices of students, and even one of the teachers, are heard introducing their own pirate radio shows.

== Cast ==
- Christian Slater as Mark Hunter
- Samantha Mathis as Nora De Niro
- Annie Ross as Principal Loretta Creswood
- Andy Romano as Mr. Murdock
- Scott Paulin as Brian Hunter
- Ellen Greene as Jan Emerson
- Mimi Kennedy as Marla Hunter
- Anthony Lucero as Malcolm Kaiser
- Billy Morrissette as Mazz Mazzilli
- Robert Schenkkan as David Deaver, guidance counselor
- Cheryl Pollak as Paige Woodward
- James Hampton as Arthur Watts of the FCC
- Lala Sloatman as Janie
- Ahmet Zappa as Jaime
- Seth Green as Joey
- Justin Hessling as Holden Chu

== Production ==
After his film Times Square, a new wave comedy, was taken away from him and re-edited, Allan Moyle retired from directing and began working on screenplays. One of them, about a teenager who runs his own pirate radio station for other teenagers, came to the attention of SC Entertainment, a Toronto-based company, and put into development. He was persuaded to direct his own screenplay. Moyle wrote it without a specific actor in mind but his development deal specified that the project would be canceled if a suitable actor could not be found. The director needed an actor who had to have "glee, to be ineffably sweet and at the same time demonic." He initially wanted to cast John Cusack, but Cusack turned down the role, as he didn't want to play another high school student following his role in Say Anything... Christian Slater met with Moyle and producer Sandy Stern and displayed all these qualities. Moyle has described the film's protagonist as an amalgam of Holden Caulfield and Lenny Bruce and the "Hard Harry" persona as a guy who "has to get credibility as an outsider. As the last angry man on the planet, he has to use the foulest language he can think of. He even pretends to masturbate on the air. He's obsessed with sex and death." The school in the film, Hubert Humphrey High, was based on a Montreal high school where director Moyle's sister used to teach that, according to Moyle, had a principal "who had a pact with the staff to enhance the credibility of the school scholastically at the expense of the students who were immigrants or culturally disabled in some way or another."

Slater disagreed with Moyle who wanted to bring in a tap dance instructor to help orchestrate a scene that begins with "Hard Harry" faking masturbation on the air and ends with him breaking into a manic dance by himself. Slater wanted to do something more spontaneous based on his instincts.

== Reception ==
Pump Up the Volume failed to catch on at the box office. When it was released on August 24, 1990, in 799 theaters, it grossed USD $1.6 million in its opening weekend. It went on to make $11.5 million in North America.

The film received generally positive reviews from critics and is currently rated 81% at Rotten Tomatoes based on 42 reviews. The consensus summarizes: "Pump Up the Volume can be a bit overbearing, but this is one teen drama with the courage of its convictions -- and a killer soundtrack." In his review for the New York Times, Stephen Holden wrote, "Much like Heathers, Pump Up the Volume doesn't know how to draw out its premise, once that premise has been thoroughly explored. As the film accelerates toward its conclusion, the strands of its clever plot are too hastily and perfunctorily resolved . . . Working within the confines of the teen-age genre film, however, Pump Up the Volume still succeeds in sounding a surprising number of honest, heartfelt notes". USA Today gave the film three-and-a-half stars out of four, praising the film's conclusion: "the ending, though in part contrived, doesn't cop out".

=== Awards ===
The movie won the Golden Space Needle Award at the Seattle International Film Festival, beating out the festival favorite, Denys Arcand's Academy Award-nominated Jesus of Montreal. Some audience members booed when the film was named the winner. It won the Audience Award at the Deauville Film Festival. At the 6th Independent Spirit Awards, it was nominated for Best Feature, Best Male Lead, Best Director, and Best Screenplay.

== Musical adaptation ==
In 2019, Point Park University's Conservatory of Performing Arts announced that it would be producing the world premiere production of the musical adaptation in conjunction with RWS Entertainment as a part of their 2019-2020 season. Jeff Thomson, composer, and Jeremy Desmon, book and lyrics, first started the project in 2006. They brought the preliminary script and music to workshop sessions at Godspeed Musicals, The Human Race Theatre, and finally Seattle's 5th Avenue Theatre in 2016 to "test its legs".

The world premiere production was set to open April 3, 2020, at Pittsburgh Playhouse's Highmark Theater, but was put on hiatus due to the COVID-19 pandemic.
