= Christopher Lloyd =

American actor (born 1938)

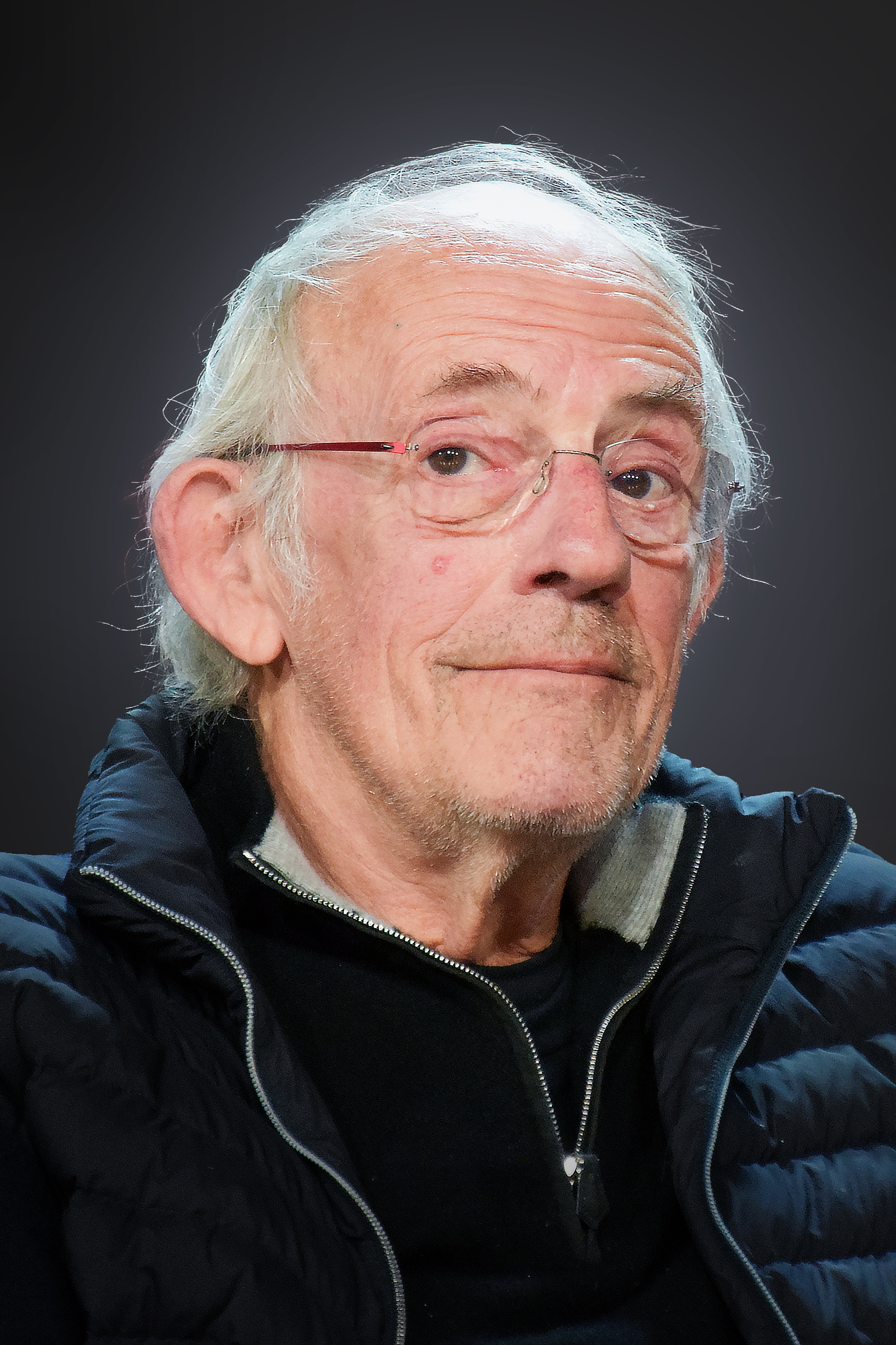
- Lloyd in 2022
- Born: Christopher Allen Lloyd; October 22, 1938 (age 88); Stamford, Connecticut, U.S.
- Occupation: Actor
- Years active: 1961–present
- Spouses: Catherine Boyd (m. 1959; div. 1971) Kay Tornborg (m. 1974; div. 1987) Carol Ann Vanek (m. 1988; div. 1991) Jane Walker Wood (m. 1992; div. 2005) Lisa Loiacono (m. 2016)
- Relatives: Sam Lloyd (nephew); Lewis Henry Lapham (maternal grandfather)

Christopher Allen Lloyd (born October 22, 1938) is an American actor, known for playing larger-than-life characters across theatre productions, films, and television shows since the 1960s, particularly Emmett "Doc" Brown in the Back to the Future trilogy (1985–1990) and "Reverend" Jim Ignatowski in the comedy series Taxi (1978–1983), for which he won two Emmy Awards.

Lloyd came to public attention in Northeastern theater productions during the 1960s and early 1970s, earning Drama Desk and Obie awards for his work. He made his cinematic debut in One Flew Over the Cuckoo's Nest (1975) and went on to appear as Commander Kruge in Star Trek III: The Search for Spock (1984), Professor Plum in Clue (1985), Judge Doom in Who Framed Roger Rabbit (1988), Uncle Fester in The Addams Family (1991) and its sequel Addams Family Values (1993), Switchblade Sam in Dennis the Menace (1993), Mr. Goodman in Piranha 3D (2010), Bill Crowley in I Am Not a Serial Killer (2016) and David Mansell in Nobody (2021), and its sequel Nobody 2 (2025).

Lloyd earned a third Emmy for his 1992 guest appearance as Alistair Dimple in Road to Avonlea, and won an Independent Spirit Award for his performance in Twenty Bucks (1993). He has done extensive voice work in productions like DuckTales the Movie: Treasure of the Lost Lamp (1990), Anastasia (1997), PBS Kids' Cyberchase (2002–present), which earned him two Daytime Emmy nominations, and Cartoon Network's Over the Garden Wall (2014).

== Early life ==
Lloyd was born on October 22, 1938, in Stamford, Connecticut, the son of Ruth Lloyd (née Lapham; 1896–1984), a singer and sister of San Francisco mayor Roger Lapham, and her lawyer husband Samuel R. Lloyd Jr. (1897–1959). He is the youngest of six siblings, with two brothers and three sisters. Lloyd's maternal grandfather, Lewis Henry Lapham, was one of the founders of the Texaco oil company and Lloyd is also a descendant of Mayflower passenger John Howland. Lloyd was raised in Westport, Connecticut, where he attended Staples High School and was involved in founding the high school's theater company, the Staples Players.

== Career ==
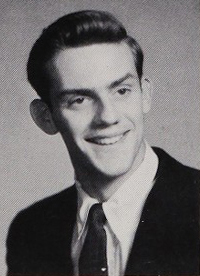
Lloyd as a high school senior, 1958

Lloyd began his career apprenticing at summer theaters in Mount Kisco, New York, and Hyannis, Massachusetts. He took acting classes in New York City at age 19—some at the Neighborhood Playhouse School of the Theatre with Sanford Meisner—and he recalled making his New York theater debut in a 1961 production of Fernando Arrabal's play And They Put Handcuffs on the Flowers, saying, "I was a replacement and it was my first sort of job in New York." He made his Broadway debut in the short-lived Red, White and Maddox (1969), and went on to Off-Broadway roles in A Midsummer Night's Dream, Kaspar (February 1973), The Harlot and the Hunted, The Seagull (January 1974), Total Eclipse (February 1974), Macbeth, In the Boom Boom Room, Cracks, Professional Resident Company, What Every Woman Knows, The Father, King Lear, Power Failure and, in mid-1972, appeared in a Jean Cocteau double bill, Orphée and The Human Voice, at the Jean Cocteau Theater at 43 Bond Street.

In 1977, Lloyd returned to Broadway for the musical Happy End. He performed in Andrzej Wajda's adaptation of Fyodor Dostoevsky's The Possessed at Yale Repertory Theater, and in Jay Broad's premiere of White Pelican at the P.A.F. Playhouse in Huntington Station, New York, on Long Island.

In 1977, he said of his training at the Neighborhood Playhouse under Meisner, "My work up to then had been very uneven. I would be good one night, dull the next. Meisner made me aware of how to be consistent in using the best that I have to offer. But I guess nobody can teach you the knack, or whatever it is, that helps you come to life on stage."

Lloyd’s first film role was psychiatric patient Max Taber in One Flew Over the Cuckoo's Nest (1975), alongside future co-star Danny DeVito. He is known for his work as "Reverend" Jim Ignatowski, the ex-hippie cabbie on the sitcom Taxi, for which he won two Primetime Emmy Awards for Outstanding Supporting Actor in a Comedy Series; and the eccentric inventor Emmett "Doc" Brown in the Back to the Future trilogy for which he was nominated for a Saturn Award. In 1985, he appeared in the pilot episode of Street Hawk. The following year, he played the reviled Professor B.O. Beanes on the television series Amazing Stories. Other roles include Klingon Commander Kruge in Star Trek III: The Search for Spock (1984) (on suggestion of fellow actor and friend Leonard Nimoy), Professor Plum in Clue (1985), Professor Dimple in an episode of Road to Avonlea (for which he won a Primetime Emmy Award for Outstanding Lead Actor in a Drama Series), the villain Judge Doom in Who Framed Roger Rabbit (1988), Merlock the Sorcerer in DuckTales the Movie (1990), Switchblade Sam in Dennis the Menace (1993), Zoltan in Radioland Murders (1994), and Uncle Fester in The Addams Family (1991) and Addams Family Values (1993).

Lloyd portrayed the star character in the adventure game Toonstruck, released in November 1996. In 1999, he was reunited onscreen with Michael J. Fox in an episode of Spin City entitled "Back to the Future IV — Judgment Day", in which Lloyd plays Owen Kingston, the former mentor of Fox's character, Mike Flaherty, who stopped by City Hall to see Kingston, only to proclaim himself God. That same year, Lloyd starred in the film remake of the 1960s series My Favorite Martian. He starred on the television series Deadly Games in the mid-1990s and was a regular on the sitcom Stacked in the mid-2000s. In 2003, he guest-starred in three of the 13 produced episodes of Tremors: The Series as the character Cletus Poffenburger. In November 2007, Lloyd was reunited onscreen with his former Taxi co-star Judd Hirsch in the season-four episode "Graphic" of the television series Numb3rs as Ross Moore. He then played the role of Ebenezer Scrooge in a 2008 production of A Christmas Carol at the Kodak Theatre with John Goodman and Jane Leeves. In 2009, he appeared in a comedic trailer for a faux horror film version of Willy Wonka & the Chocolate Factory entitled Gobstopper, in which he played Willy Wonka as a horror film-style villain.

In 2010, the Vermont-based Weston Playhouse, of which Lloyd's brother Sam was an active member, asked if there was a role Lloyd would be interested in taking on. Lloyd chose Willy Loman in Death of a Salesman, which played at Weston and at other venues throughout Vermont that fall. Also that September, he reprised his role as Dr. Emmett "Doc" Brown in Back to the Future: The Game, an episodic adventure game series developed by Telltale Games. That same month, the production company 3D Entertainment Films announced Lloyd would star as an eccentric professor who with his lab assistant explore the various dimensions in Time, the Fourth Dimension, an approximately 45-minute Imax 3D film that was planned for release in 2012.

On January 21, 2011, he appeared in "The Firefly" episode of the J. J. Abrams television series Fringe as Roscoe Joyce. That August, he reprised the role of Dr. Emmett Brown (from Back to the Future) as part of an advertising campaign for Garbarino, an Argentine appliance company, and also as part of Nike's "Back For the Future" campaign for the benefit of The Michael J. Fox Foundation. In 2012 and 2013, Lloyd voiced Doc Brown in two episodes of Robot Chicken. He was a guest star on the 100th episode of the USA Network sitcom Psych as Martin Khan in 2013.

In May 2013, Lloyd appeared as the narrator and the character Azdak in the Bertolt Brecht play The Caucasian Chalk Circle, produced by the Classic Stage Company in New York.

On the October 21, 2015, episode of Jimmy Kimmel Live, Lloyd and Michael J. Fox appeared in a Back to the Future skit to commemorate the date that Doc and Marty traveled to in the second installment of the film trilogy.

In May 2018, Lloyd made a cameo appearance in the episode titled "No Country for Old Women" of Roseanne, where he played the role of Lou, the boyfriend to the mother of Roseanne and Jackie. He is set to reprise the role in an episode of its spin-off, The Conners, airing May 4, 2022. In late 2019, he provided the voice of Xehanort in the "Re Mind" downloadable content of Kingdom Hearts III, taking over the role from the late Leonard Nimoy and Rutger Hauer, and reprised the role in the 2020 video game Kingdom Hearts: Melody of Memory.

By July 2020, Lloyd was cast as The Alchemist in Man & Witch, a family-friendly fantasy-adventure film directed by Rob Margolies, with Jim Henson's Creature Shop set to create the puppets for the film.

In March 2021, Lloyd played the best friend of William Shatner in the romantic comedy film Senior Moment, also starring Jean Smart.

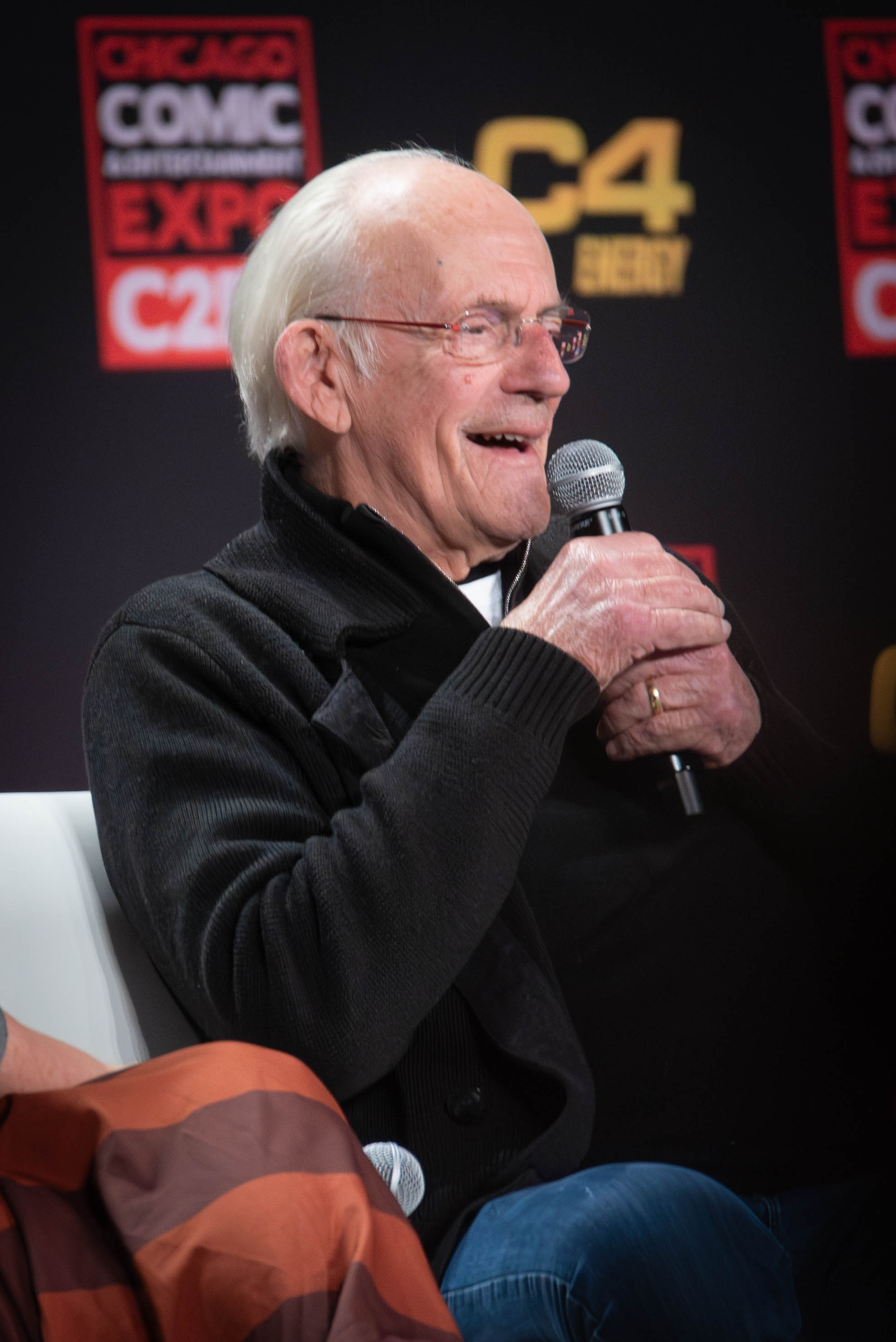
Lloyd at the Chicago Comic & Entertainment Expo in 2024

In September 2021, Lloyd portrayed Rick Sanchez in a series of promotional interstitials directed by Paul B. Cummings for the two-part fifth season finale of Rick and Morty, a character inspired by Lloyd's portrayal of Dr. Emmett "Doc" Brown from Back to the Future, alongside Jaeden Martell as Morty Smith.

In March 2022, Lloyd appeared in a promotion for the time travel film The Adam Project along with two of its stars, Ryan Reynolds and Mark Ruffalo.

In April 2022, it was announced that Lloyd would star in Spirit Halloween: The Movie, a film produced in partnership with the Spirit Halloween retailer. He plays Alec Windsor, a wealthy land developer who disappeared one Halloween night, and whose spirit is said to haunt the town in which the film is set each year on Halloween. The film was released on video-on-demand (VOD) on October 11, 2022.

In April 2023, Lloyd guest starred in an episode of the third season of The Mandalorian, portraying the role of Commissioner Helgait. In June 2023, Lloyd was announced to be starring in the live-action Knuckles series, which premiered in April 2024.

== Personal life ==
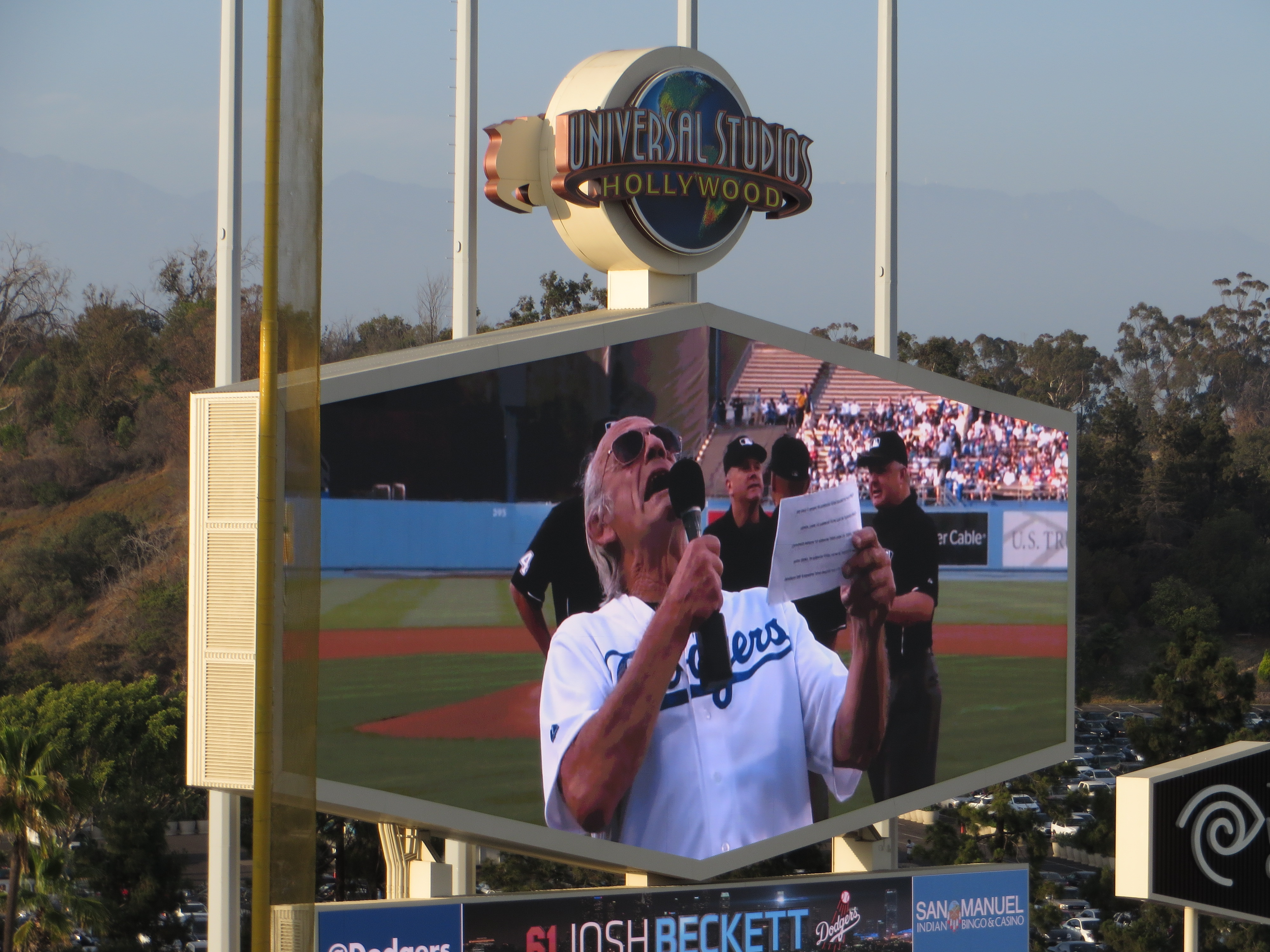
Lloyd on the scoreboard of Dodger Stadium in 2014

Lloyd married Catharine Dallas Dixon Boyd on June 6, 1959. They divorced in 1971. He married actress Kay Tornborg in 1974, divorcing her circa 1987. Lloyd's third marriage, to Carol Ann Vanek, had lasted more than two years when they were in the process of divorce in July 1991. His fourth marriage, to screenwriter Jane Walker Wood, lasted from 1992 to 2005. In 2016, he married Lisa Loiacono, who was Lloyd's real estate agent when he sold his house in Montecito, California, in 2012. His former house on that lot was destroyed in the Tea Fire of November 2008.

Lloyd's philanthropist mother, Ruth Lapham Lloyd, died in 1984 at age 88. Her other surviving children were Donald L. Mygatt (who died in 2003), Antoinette L. Mygatt Lucas, Samuel Lloyd III (who later died in 2017), Ruth Lloyd Scott Ax, and Adele L. Kinney. Lloyd's nephew, Sam Lloyd (1963–2020), was known for playing lawyer Ted Buckland on Scrubs.

== Filmography ==
=== Film ===
Year	Title	Role	Notes
1975	One Flew Over the Cuckoo's Nest	Max Taber	
1977	Another Man, Another Chance	Jesse James	Uncredited
1978	Three Warriors	Steve Chaffey	
1978	Goin' South	Deputy Towfield	
1979	Butch and Sundance: The Early Days	Bill Tod Carver	
1979	The Lady in Red	Frognose	
1979	The Onion Field	Jailhouse lawyer	
1980	The Black Marble	Arnold's Collector	
1980	Schizoid	Gilbert	
1980	Pilgrim, Farewell	Paul	
1981	The Legend of the Lone Ranger	Maj. Bartholomew "Butch" Cavendish	
1981	The Postman Always Rings Twice	The Salesman	
1981	National Lampoon's Movie Madness	Samuel Starkman	Segment: "Municipalians"
1983	Mr. Mom	Larry	
1983	To Be or Not to Be	S.S. Captain Schultz	
1984	Star Trek III: The Search for Spock	Cmdr. Kruge	
1984	The Adventures of Buckaroo Banzai Across the 8th Dimension	John Bigbooté	
1984	National Lampoon's Joy of Sex	Coach Hindenberg	
1985	Back to the Future	Dr. Emmett "Doc" Brown	
1985	Clue	Prof. Plum	
1986	Miracles	Harry	
1987	Walk Like a Man	Reggie Shand / Henry Shand	
1987	Legend of the White Horse	Jim Martin	
1988	Track 29	Henry Henry	
1988	Who Framed Roger Rabbit	Judge Doom	
1988	Eight Men Out	Bill Burns	
1989	The Dream Team	Henry Sikorsky	
1989	Back to the Future Part II	Dr. Emmett "Doc" Brown	
1990	Back to the Future Part III	Dr. Emmett "Doc" Brown	
1990	Why Me?	Bruno Daley	
1990	DuckTales the Movie: Treasure of the Lost Lamp	Merlock	Voice
1991	Suburban Commando	Charlie Wilcox	
1991	The Addams Family	Uncle Fester/Gordon Craven	
1993	Twenty Bucks	Jimmy	
1993	Dennis the Menace	Switchblade Sam	
1993	Addams Family Values	Uncle Fester Addams	
1994	Angels in the Outfield	Al "The Boss" Angel	
1994	Camp Nowhere	Dennis Van Welker	
1994	Radioland Murders	Zoltan	
1994	The Pagemaster	Mr. Dewey / The Pagemaster	
1995	Mr. Payback: An Interactive Movie	Ed Jarvis	Short subject
1995	Things to Do in Denver When You're Dead	Pieces	
1996	Cadillac Ranch	Wood Grimes	
1997	Changing Habits	Theo Teagarden	
1997	Dinner at Fred's	Dad	
1997	Anastasia	Grigori Rasputin	Voice
1998	The Real Blonde	Ernst	
1998	The Animated Adventures of Tom Sawyer	Judge Thatcher	Voice
1999	My Favorite Martian	Uncle Martin	
1999	Baby Geniuses	Heep	
1999	Convergence	Morley Allen	
1999	Man on the Moon	Himself - Taxi actor	Cameo
2001	Kids World	Leo	
2001	On the Edge	Attorney Bum	Segment: "Happy Birthday"
2002	Interstate 60	Ray	
2002	Wish You Were Dead	Bruce	
2002	Hey Arnold!: The Movie	Coroner	Voice
2003	Haunted Lighthouse	Cap'n Jack	Short subject
2004	Admissions	Stewart Worthy	
2005	Here Comes Peter Cottontail: The Movie	Seymour S. Sassafras	Voice
2005	Bad Girls from Valley High	Mr. Chauncey	
2005	Enfants Terribles	Reverend Burr	
2007	Flakes	Willie	
2008	Fly Me to the Moon	Amos	Voice
2008	The Tale of Despereaux	Hovis	Voice
2009	Call of the Wild	"Grandpa" Bill Hale	
2009	Santa Buddies	Stan Cruge	
2010	Snowmen	The Caretaker	
2010	Jack and the Beanstalk	Headmaster	
2010	Piranha 3D	Mr. Goodman	
2011	Love, Wedding, Marriage	Dr. George	
2011	InSight	Shep	
2011	Adventures of Serial Buddies	Dr. Von Gearheart	
2011	Snowflake, the White Gorilla	Dr. Archibald Pepper	Voice, English dub
2011	The Chateau Meroux	Nathan	
2012	Foodfight!	Mr. Clipboard	Voice
2012	Cadaver	Cadaver	Voice; short subject
2012	Piranha 3DD	Mr. Goodman	
2012	Delhi Safari	Pigeon	Voice, English dub
2012	Axe Boat 2012	Night Watchman	Short subject
2012	The Oogieloves in the Big Balloon Adventure	Lero Sombrero	
2012	The Illusionauts	Teacher	English dub
2012	Mickey Matson and the Copperhead Conspiracy	Grandpa Jack	
2012	Dead Before Dawn	Horus Galloway	
2012	Excuse Me for Living	Lars	
2012	Sid the Science Kid: The Movie	Dr. Bonanodon	Voice
2012	Last Call	Pete	
2012	Freedom Force	Professor	Voice, English dub
2013	Jungle Master	Dr. Sedgwick	Voice
2013	The Coin	William	Short subject
2014	A Million Ways to Die in the West	Doc Brown	Cameo
2014	Sin City: A Dame to Kill For	Kroenig	
2014	The One I Wrote for You	Pop	
2015	88	Cyrus	
2015	Back in Time	Himself	Documentary
2015	Doc Brown Saves the World	Dr. Emmett "Doc" Brown	Short subject
2015	The Boat Builder	Abner	
2016	I Am Not a Serial Killer	Mr. Crowley	
2016	Donald Trump's The Art of the Deal: The Movie	Dr. Emmett "Doc" Brown	Cameo
2016	Cold Moon	James Redfield	
2017	Going in Style	Milton Kupchak	
2017	Muse	Bernard Rauschen	
2017	The Sound	Clinton Jones	
2018	Boundaries	Stanley	
2018	Making a Killing	Lloyd Mickey	
2018	Rerun	Future George Benson	
2019	The Haunted Swordsman	The Black Monk	Voice; short subject
2021	Nobody	David Mansell	
2021	Senior Moment	Sal Spinelli	
2021	Queen Bees	Arthur Lane	
2021	The Tender Bar	Grandpa Moehringer	
2022	Spirit Halloween: The Movie	Alec Windsor	
2022	Tankhouse	Buford	
2023	Self Reliance	Dennis Walcott	
2023	Nandor Fodor and the Talking Mongoose	Dr. Harry Price	
2023	Camp Hideout	Falco	
2024	Man and Witch: The Dance of a Thousand Steps	Alchemist	
2024	Guns & Moses	Sol Fassbinder	
2025	Nobody 2	David Mansell	
TBA	The Movers †	Henry Solomon	Post-production

=== Television ===
Year	Title	Role	Notes
1976	The Adams Chronicles	Tsar Alexandre	Episode: "Chapter VIII: John Quincy Adams, Secretary of State"
1978	Lacy and the Mississippi Queen	Jennings	Television film
1978	The Word	Hans Bogardus	Television miniseries
1978–1979	Barney Miller	Arnold Scully / Vincent Carew	2 episodes
1978–1983	Taxi	Reverend Jim Ignatowski	84 episodes
1979	Stunt Seven a.k.a. The Fantastic Seven	Skip Hartman	Television film
1982	Best of the West	The Calico Kid	3 episodes
1982	American Playhouse	Paul	Episode: "Pilgrim, Farewell"
1982	Money on the Side	Sergeant Stampone	Television film
1983	September Gun	Jack Brian	Television film
1984	Cheers	Phillip Semenko	2 episodes
1984	Old Friends	Jerry Forbes	Pilot
1984	The Cowboy and the Ballerina	Woody	Television film
1985	Street Hawk	Anthony Corrido	Episode: "Pilot"
1986	Amazing Stories	Prof. Beanes	Episode: "Go to the Head of the Class"
1987	Tales from the Hollywood Hills: Pat Hobby Teamed with Genius	Pat Hobby	Television film
1990	The Earth Day Special	Dr. Emmett "Doc" Brown	Television special
1991–1992	Back to the Future: The Animated Series	Dr. Emmett "Doc" Brown	Live action; 26 episodes
1992	T Bone N Weasel	William "Weasel" Weasler	Television film
1992	Dead Ahead: The Exxon Valdez Disaster	Frank Iarossi	Television film
1992	Road to Avonlea	Alistair Dimple	Episode: "Another Point of View"
1994	In Search of Dr. Seuss	Mr. Hunch	Television film
1995	Fallen Angels	The Continental Op	Episode: "Fly Paper"
1995	Rent-a-Kid	Lawrence 'Larry' Kayvey	Television film
1995–1996	Deadly Games	Sebastian Jackal / Jordan Kenneth Lloyd	13 episodes
1996	The Right to Remain Silent	Johnny Benjamin	Television film
1997	Quicksilver Highway	Aaron Quicksilver	Television film
1997	Angels in the Endzone	Al "The Boss" Angel	Television film
1998	The Ransom of Red Chief	Sam Howard	Television film
1999	Spin City	Owen Kingston	Episode: "Back to the Future IV"
1999	Alice in Wonderland	The White Knight	Television film
1999	It Came from the Sky	Jarvis Moody	Television film
2001	The Tick	Mr. Fishladder	Uncredited; Episode: "Pilot"
2001	Wit	Dr. Harvey Kelekian	Television film
2001	Chasing Destiny	Jet James	Television film
2001	When Good Ghouls Go Bad	Uncle Fred Walker	Television film
2002–present	Cyberchase	The Hacker	Voice, 153 episodes
2002	Malcolm in the Middle	Walter	Episode: "Family Reunion"
2002	The Big Time	Doc Powers	Television film
2003	Ed	Burt Kiffle	Episode: "The Move"
2003	Tremors	Dr. Cletus Poffenberger	3 episodes
2004	The Grim Adventures of Billy & Mandy	Snail	Voice, episode: "Dumb Luck"
2004	I Dream	Prof. Toone	13 episodes
2004–2005	Clubhouse	Lou Russo	11 episodes
2005	The West Wing	Prof. Lawrence Lessig	Episode: "The Wake Up Call"
2005	King of the Hill	Smitty	Voice, episode: "Care-Takin' Care of Business"
2005	Detectives	Anderson in Launderette	Television film
2005–2006	Stacked	Harold March	19 episodes
2006	Masters of Horror	Everett Neely	Episode: "Valerie on the Stairs"
2006	A Perfect Day	Michael	Television film
2007	Numbers	Ross Moore	Episode: "Graphic"
2008	Live from Lincoln Center	King Pellinore	Episode: "Camelot"
2008	Law & Order: Criminal Intent	Carmine	Episode: "Vanishing Act"
2009	Meteor	Prof. Daniel Lehman	2 episodes
2009	Knights of Bloodsteel	Tesselink	2 episodes
2010	Chuck	Dr. Leo Dreyfus	Episode: "Chuck versus the Tooth"
2011	Fringe	Roscoe Joyce	Episode: "The Firefly"
2011	Family Practice	Robert Passion Foote	Unaired pilot
2011–2013	Robot Chicken	Dr. Emmett "Doc" Brown / Early Hacker / Schlomo	Voice, 2 episodes
2012	Dorothy and the Witches of Oz	Wizard of Oz	Television film
2012	R.L. Stine's The Haunting Hour	Grandpa	Episode: "Grampires: Part 1"
2012	Anything But Christmas	Harry	Television film
2013	Raising Hope	Dennis Powers	Episode: " Credit Where Credit Is Due"
2013	Psych	Martin Kahn	Episode: "100 Clues"
2014	The Michael J. Fox Show	Principal McTavish	Episode: "Health"
2014	Blood Lake: Attack of the Killer Lampreys	Mayor Akerman	Television film
2014	Zodiac: Signs of the Apocalypse	Harry Setag	Television film
2014	Over the Garden Wall	The Woodsman	Voice, 4 episodes
2014–2015	Granite Flats	Professor Hargraves	12 episodes
2015	The Simpsons	Rev. Jim Ignatowski	Voice, episode: "My Fare Lady"
2015	Just in Time for Christmas	Grandpa Bob	Television film
2016	The Big Bang Theory	Theodore	Episode: "The Property Division Collision"
2017–2018	12 Monkeys	The Missionary / Zalmon Shaw	3 episodes
2018	Roseanne	Lou	Episode: "No Country for Old Women"
2018	Guess Who Died	Mort	Unaired pilot
2019	A.P. Bio	Melvin	Episode: "Melvin"
2019	Big City Greens	Santa Claus	Voice, episode: "Green Christmas"
2020	Prop Culture	Self	Episode: "Who Framed Roger Rabbit"
2020	NCIS	Joseph "Joe" Smith	Episode: "The Arizona"
2021	Next Stop, Christmas	Train Conductor	Hallmark television film
2022	The Conners	Lou	Episode: "The Best Laid Plans, A Contrabassoon and A Sinking Feeling"
2023	The Mandalorian	Commissioner Helgait	Episode: "Chapter 22: Guns for Hire"
2023	A Million Little Things	Himself	Episode: "Father's Day"
2024	Knuckles	Pachacamac	Voice, 2 episodes
2024	Hacks	Larry Arbuckle	Episode: "The Deborah Vance Christmas Spectacular"
2025	Everybody's Live with John Mulaney	Willy Loman / Himself	Episode: "Lending People Money"
2025	Wednesday	Professor Orloff	4 episodes
2025	Happy's Place	Clive	Episode: "Izzy and the Professor"

=== Theatre ===
Year	Title	Role	Venue
1961	And They Put Handcuffs on Flowers		New York
1969	Red, White and Maddox	Bombardier	Cort Theatre, Broadway
1973	Kaspar	Kaspar	Chelsea Theater Center, Off-Broadway
1973	The Seagull	Konstantin Treplev	Roundabout Stage II, Off-Broadway
1974	Macbeth	Banquo / Cathness	Mitzi E. Newhouse Theater, Off-Broadway
1974	Total Eclipse	Verlaine	Chelsea Theater Center, Off-Broadway
1974	In the Boom Boom Room	Al	The Public Theater, Off-Broadway
1977	Happy End	Bill Cracker	Martin Beck Theatre, Broadway
1990	The Father	Captain Lassen	American Repertory Theater, Massachusetts
1998	Waiting for Godot	Pozzo	CSC Theatre, Off-Broadway
2001	The Unexpected Man	Parsky	Geffen Playhouse, Los Angeles
2002	Morning's at Seven	Carl Bolton	Broadway, Broadway
2002	Twelfth Night	Malvolio	Delacorte Theatre, Off-Broadway
2003	Trumbo: Red, White and Blacklisted	Dalton Trumbo	Westside Theatre, Off-Broadway
2008	Camelot	Pellinore	Avery Fisher Hall
2008	A Christmas Carol	Scrooge	Kodak Theatre, Los Angeles
2010	Death of a Salesman	Willy Loman	Weston Playhouse, Vermont
2013	The Caucasian Chalk Circle	The Singer / Azdak	CSC Theatre, Off-Broadway
2018	Our Town	Stage Manager	Weston Playhouse, Vermont
2018	Pound	Ezra Pound	Theatre Row, Off-Broadway
2021	King Lear	King Lear	New Spruce Theater, Lenox, Massachusetts

=== Video games ===
Year	Title	Role	Notes
1994	Rescue the Scientists	Lieutenant Jack Tempus	Also likeness
1996	Toonstruck	Drew Blanc	Also likeness and live action sequences
2006	Back to the Future Video Slots	Dr. Emmett "Doc" Brown	
2010–2011	Back to the Future: The Game	Dr. Emmett "Doc" Brown	
2013	Back to the Future Back in Time Video Slots	Dr. Emmett "Doc" Brown	
2015	Lego Dimensions	Dr. Emmett "Doc" Brown	
2015	King's Quest	Elderly King Graham	
2020	Kingdom Hearts III Re:Mind	Xehanort	
2020	Kingdom Hearts: Melody of Memory	Xehanort	

=== Music videos ===
Year	Artist	Title	Role
1985	Huey Lewis and the News	"The Power of Love"	Dr. Emmett "Doc" Brown
2008	O'Neal McKnight	"Check Your Coat"	Dr. Emmett "Doc" Brown

=== Other ===
Year	Title	Role	Notes
1990	Back to the Future: The Pinball	Dr. Emmett "Doc" Brown	Pinball machine
1991	Back to the Future: The Ride	Dr. Emmett "Doc" Brown	Simulator ride
2008	The Simpsons Ride	Dr. Emmett "Doc" Brown	Simulator ride

== Awards ==
Year	Award	Category	Production / Role	Result
1973	Obie Award	Distinguished Performance	Kaspar	Won
1973	Drama Desk Award	Best Performance	Kaspar	Won
1982	Primetime Emmy Award	Outstanding Supporting Actor in a Comedy Series	Taxi	Won
1983	Primetime Emmy Award	Outstanding Supporting Actor in a Comedy Series	Taxi	Won
1986	Saturn Award	Best Supporting Actor	Back to the Future	Nominated
1990	Saturn Award	Best Supporting Actor	Who Framed Roger Rabbit	Nominated
1992	Primetime Emmy Award	Outstanding Lead Actor in a Drama Series	Road to Avonlea (Episode: "Another Point of View")	Won
1994	Independent Spirit Awards	Best Supporting Male	Twenty Bucks	Won
2008	Daytime Emmy Awards	Outstanding Performer in an Animated Program	Cyberchase	Nominated
2013	Golden Raspberry Awards	Worst Screen Ensemble (shared with the entire cast)	The Oogieloves in the Big Balloon Adventure	Nominated
2015	Daytime Emmy Awards	Outstanding Performer in an Animated Program	Cyberchase	Nominated
2016	British Independent Film Awards	Best Supporting Actor	I Am Not a Serial Killer	Nominated
2016	NAVGTR Awards	Performance in a Comedy, Lead	King's Quest: The Good Knight	Won
2024	Primetime Emmy Award	Outstanding Guest Actor in a Comedy Series	Hacks (Episode: "The Deborah Vance Christmas Spectacular")	Nominated
