= Weston Playhouse Theatre Company =

Theater company in Weston, Vermont, U.S.

Weston Theater Company (formerly known as Weston Playhouse Theatre Company) is a theater company in Weston, Vermont, United States of America. It is the oldest professional theater in Vermont.

== History ==
The theater was founded in 1937. The original theater burned in 1962.In 2015, it was awarded the Rosetta LeNoire Awardby the Actors Equity Association. In 2017, it opened a new theater complex at Walker Farm. Christopher Lloyd is among its alumni.
