= Sheryl Lee Ralph =

American actress and singer (born 1956)

The Honourable Sheryl Lee Ralph OJ (Hon.)
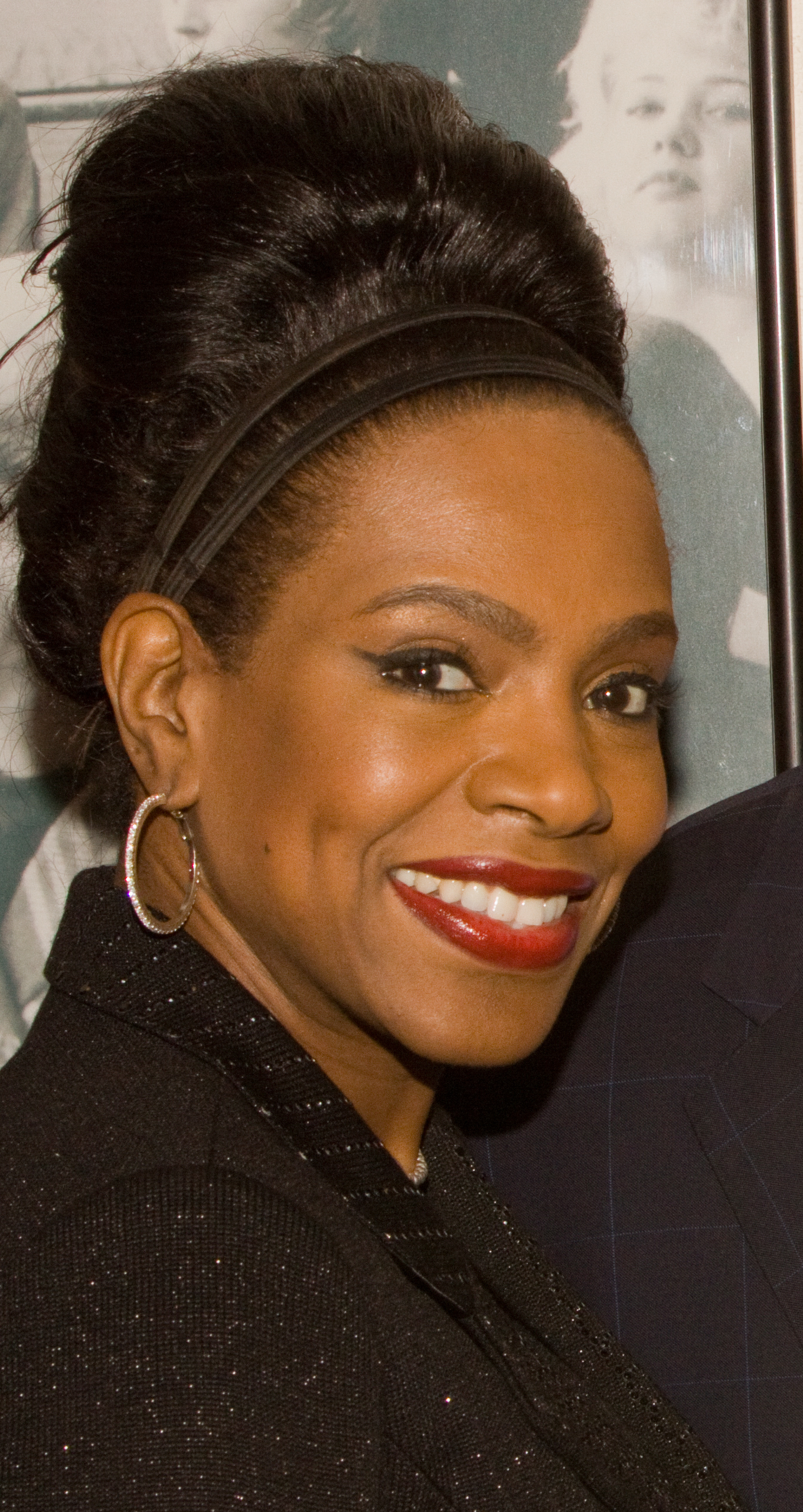
- Ralph in 2012
- Born: December 30, 1956 (age 69); Waterbury, Connecticut, U.S.
- Other name: Sheryl Lee Ralph-Hughes
- Education: Rutgers University, New Brunswick (BFA)
- Occupations: Actress; singer
- Years active: 1977–present
- Known for: Dreamgirls (Broadway; 1981); It's a Living; Moesha; Motherland: Fort Salem; Abbott Elementary
- Spouses: Eric Maurice (m. 1990; div. 2001) Vincent Hughes (m. 2005)
- Children: 2
- Website: sherylleeralph.com

Sheryl Lee Ralph OJ (Hon.) (born December 30, 1956) is an American actress and singer. Known for her performances on stage and screen, she earned acclaim for her role as Deena Jones in the Broadway musical Dreamgirls (1981), for which she was nominated for a Tony Award for Best Actress in a Musical. Since 2021, she has starred as Barbara Howard on the ABC mockumentary sitcom Abbott Elementary, for which she won the Primetime Emmy Award for Outstanding Supporting Actress in a Comedy Series in 2022, becoming the first Black woman in 35 years to win the award.

She made her film debut in the 1977 comedy A Piece of the Action. In 1991, she won the Independent Spirit Award for Best Supporting Female for her performance in the 1990 comedy-drama film To Sleep with Anger. Ralph's other notable roles include The Mighty Quinn (1989), Mistress (1992), The Distinguished Gentleman (1992), Sister Act 2: Back in the Habit (1993), and The Comeback Trail (2020).

After early guest roles on television shows such as Good Times, The Jeffersons, and Wonder Woman she then starred in the ABC sitcoms It's a Living (1986–1989) and New Attitude (1990), as well as the Nick at Nite sitcom Instant Mom (2013–2015). Her role as Dee Mitchell in the UPN sitcom Moesha (1996–2001) earned her five NAACP Image Award nominations.

Her other Broadway roles include Muzzy Van Hossmere in Thoroughly Modern Millie (2002) and Madame Morrible in Wicked (2016–2017). Additionally, she has produced the Broadway plays Thoughts of a Colored Man (2021) and Ohio State Murders (2022).

== Early life ==
Ralph was born in Waterbury, Connecticut, the daughter of Dr. Stanley Ralph, an African-American college professor, and Ivy Ralph OD, a Jamaican fashion designer and the creator of the kariba suit. She has a younger brother, actor and comedian Michael Ralph. According to research conducted by Finding Your Roots, her maternal 3rd great grandfather was a white man named Hugh McClymont, a wealthy estate owner in Jamaica who bequeathed his entire property "Ginger Hall" to his free quadroon wife, Mary Robinson, and their children. She was raised between Mandeville, Jamaica, and Long Island.

During her time at Rutgers University, Ralph was one of the earliest winners of the Irene Ryan Acting Scholarships awarded by the American College Theatre Festival.

That year she was named one of the top ten college women in America by Glamour magazine. Initially she hoped to study medicine, but after dealing with cadavers in a pre-med class and winning a scholarship in a competition at the American College Theatre Festival, she gave up medicine for the performing arts.

== Career ==
=== 1977–1989: Early roles and Dreamgirls ===
Ralph began her career in the 1970s, starring in the 1977 American crime comedy film A Piece of the Action directed by Sidney Poitier. She also made several appearances in television shows, such as Good Times, Wonder Woman, and The Jeffersons. Ralph then landed a role in the Broadway production Reggae (1980), before portraying Deena Jones in the original Broadway musical Dreamgirls (1981). On television, she was in the cast of the CBS daytime soap opera Search for Tomorrow while starring on Broadway in Dreamgirls. For her performance in Dreamgirls, Ralph was nominated in 1982 for a Tony Award for Best Actress in a Musical.

Afterwards, she signed with Sid Bernstein's music label, and released her only studio album In the Evening in 1984. The album's title track peaked at No. 5 on the Billboard Dance Music/Club Play Singles chart and No. 64 on the UK Singles Chart that same year. Ralph landed the leading role of Ginger St. James on the television series It's a Living. In 1988, she starred in the Disney film Oliver & Company, providing the voice of Rita, a sassy Afghan Hound. Her first leading role in a film came as Denzel Washington's wife in The Mighty Quinn, released in 1989.

=== 1990–2020: Film roles and Moesha ===
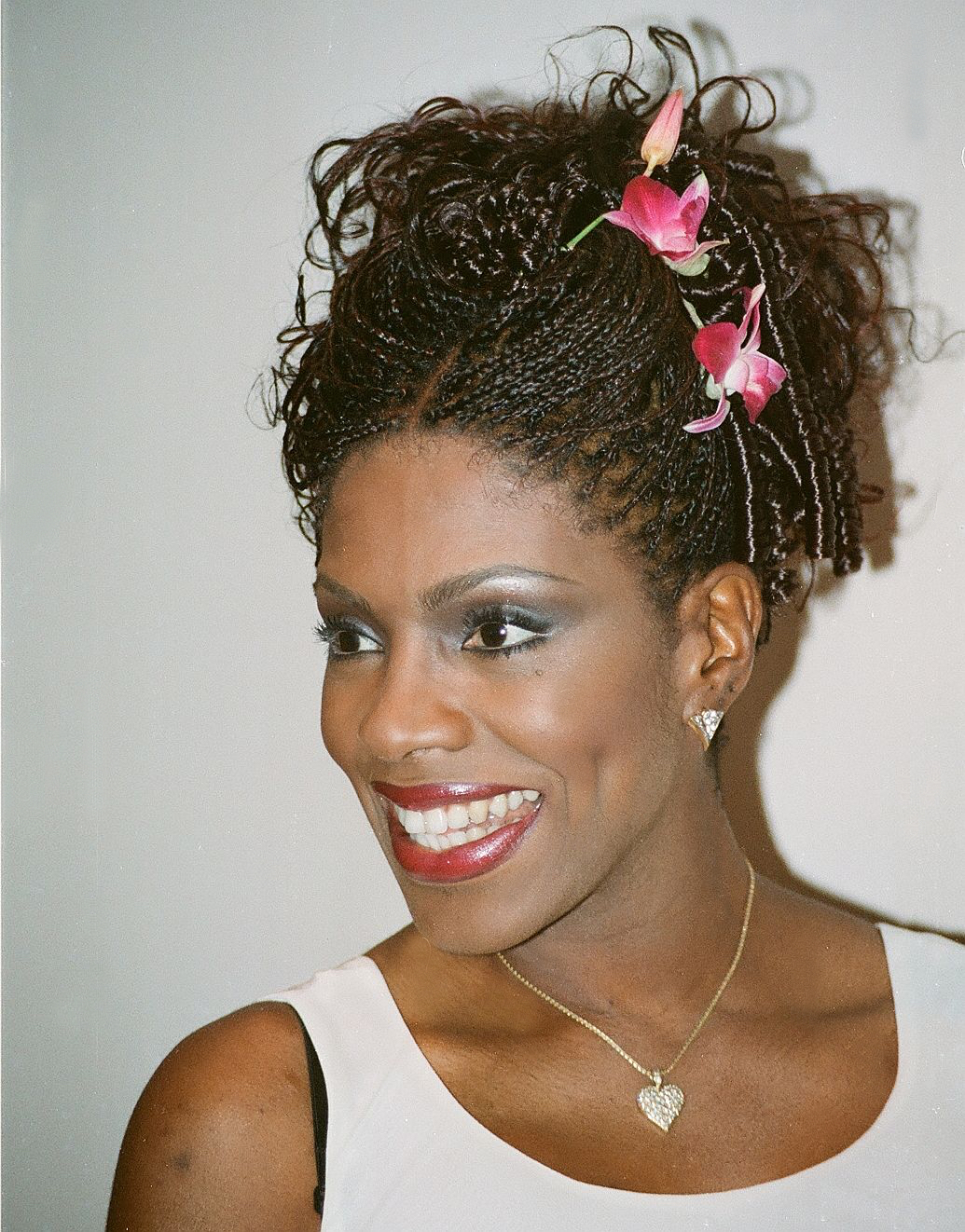
Ralph in 1997

In 1990, she was cast as Vicki St. James in the ABC sitcom New Attitude. The following year, Ralph won the Independent Spirit Award for Best Supporting Female for her performance in the 1990 drama film To Sleep with Anger. In 1992, she starred with Robert De Niro in the title role in Mistress. That same year, she played Etienne Toussaint-Bouvier on Designing Women, and co-starred with Eddie Murphy in The Distinguished Gentleman. She also played Florence Watson, the mother of Rita Louise Watson (Lauryn Hill) in the 1993 film Sister Act 2: Back in the Habit. Her role as Dee Mitchell on Moesha (1996–2001) earned her five nominations for the NAACP Image Award for Outstanding Supporting Actress in a Comedy Series. During the 1990s, she also had roles in The Flintstones, Deterrence, and Unconditional Love. She provided the voice of Cheetah in Justice League and Justice League Unlimited. Ralph produced Divas Simply Singing, which has become an important AIDS fundraiser. She also appeared on the Showtime series Barbershop as Claire. Ralph played a character who brought a new face to the sufferings of war in the NBC hit series ER. Ralph's 2002 project Baby of the Family concerns a young child who is born with a caul over her head, which enables her to see ghosts and the future. Ralph was also featured with son Etienne on MTV's My Super Sweet 16 and BET's Baldwin Hills, as well as an episode of Clean House that also featured her two children, Etienne and Ivy-Victoria (aka Coco), named after Ralph's mother.

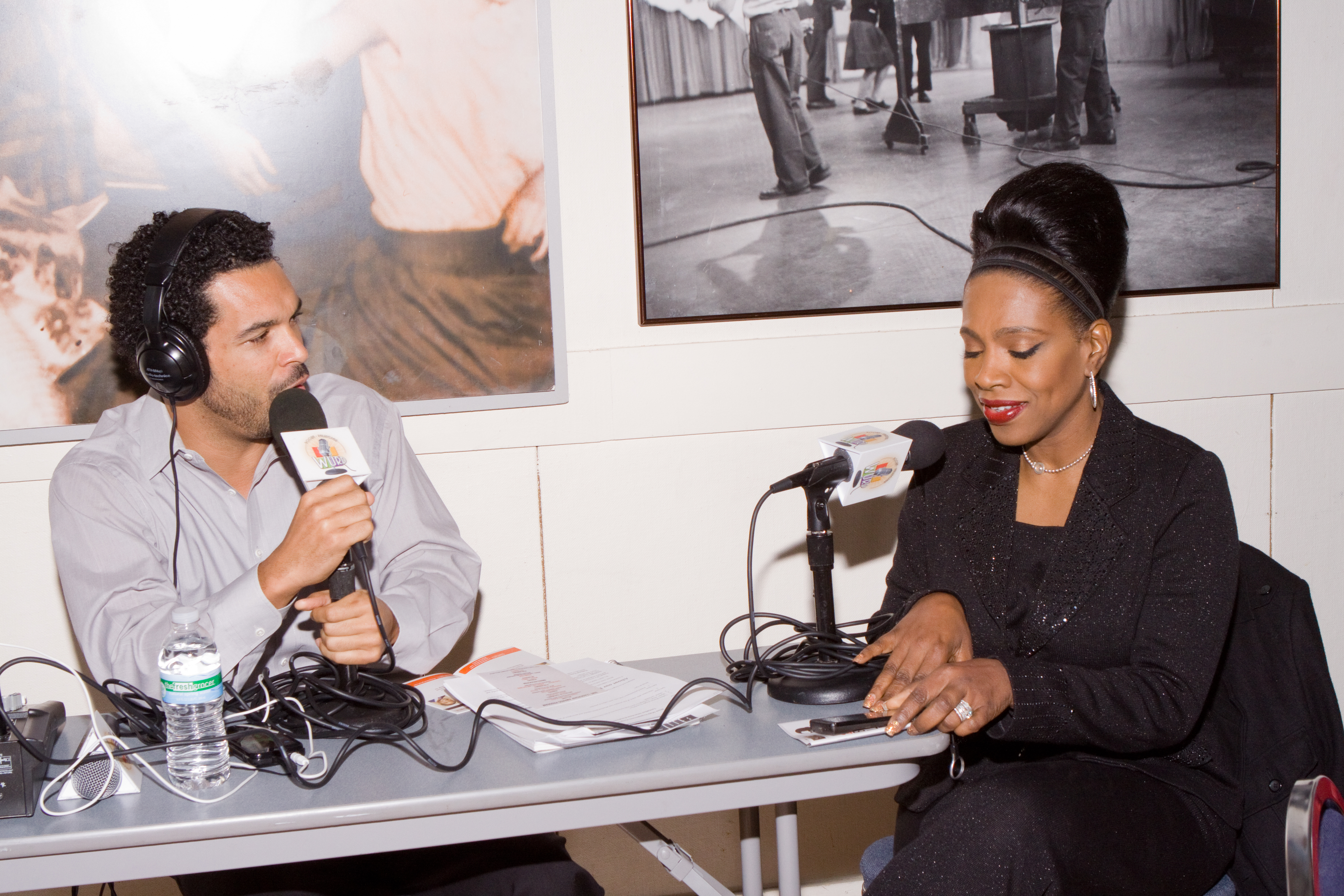
Ralph in 2012

On June 16, 2009, it was announced that Ralph would join the cast of the Broadway-bound musical The First Wives Club as Elyse. She replaced Adriane Lenox, who withdrew from the show due to health concerns. In 2011, Ralph guest-starred in Young Justice as Amanda Waller. In 2013, Ralph appeared in the NBC television show Smash as Cynthia, the mother of Jennifer Hudson's character. On February 9, 2013, Ralph appeared at the 2013 Columbus Middle School youth rally in Columbus, Mississippi. In August 2014, she appeared on KTLA Los Angeles Morning News as a fill-in entertainment reporter. In November 2014, Ralph appeared on Nicky, Ricky, Dicky & Dawn as the rich lady who claims her dog from Nicky, Ricky, Dicky, and Dawn. Some of her recent TV appearances include the TNT dramedy Claws, and on the Nickelodeon sitcom Instant Mom as the mother of Stephanie (Tia Mowry). From January 10 to April 11, 2019, Ralph appeared as one of the main characters, Rose, in the television series Fam, which ran for one season and was canceled in May 2019.

=== 2021–present: Abbott Elementary ===
In 2021, Ralph joined the sitcom Abbott Elementary, portraying veteran elementary school teacher Barbara Howard. For her role, Ralph won the Primetime Emmy Award for Outstanding Supporting Actress in a Comedy Series in 2022, becoming the second Black actress to win in the category after Jackée Harry, who won in 1987 for 227, and the Critics' Choice Television Award for Best Supporting Actress in a Comedy Series in 2023. In October 2022, Ralph was presented with the Order of Jamaica by the governor-general for her contribution to the national film industry.

In 2023, Ralph performed "Lift Every Voice and Sing", also known as the Black national anthem, at the Super Bowl LVII pre-show. Later in 2023, Ralph became the first celebrity and the first Black person to play Mrs. Claus in the Macy's Thanksgiving Day Parade’s history.

In 2024, Ralph sang for President Joe Biden at a large fundraiser to raise money for his re-election. Earlier, she had joined Vice President Kamala Harris for an abortion-related campaign event in Pennsylvania.

Ralph was celebrated at the 2024 Variety Faith and Spirituality in Entertainment Honors for her portrayal of Christian teacher Barbara Howard on “Abbott Elementary."

== Personal life ==
Ralph was married to French businessman Eric Maurice from 1990 to 2001, and they have two children, a son born in 1992 and a daughter in 1995. She has been married to Pennsylvania State Senator Vincent Hughes since July 30, 2005.

In July 2004, Ralph was inducted as an honorary member of Delta Sigma Theta sorority at the 47th National Convention in Las Vegas, Nevada.

In May 2008, Ralph was awarded an honorary doctorate of humane letters from Tougaloo College after giving the commencement address.

In 2023, Ralph was named the commencement speaker for Rutgers University, her alma mater. It was also announced that she would receive an honorary Doctorate of Fine Arts degree at the ceremony.

In December 2024, Ralph was honored as the Person of the Year in the Jamaicans.com Best of Jamaica 2024 Awards. This prestigious recognition celebrated her contributions to representing Jamaican culture and excellence globally.

In December 2024, Ralph was named the 2024 Advocate of the Year by The Advocate, recognizing her impactful work in advocacy and representation of marginalized communities. On April 16, 2025, Ralph was honored with a star on Hollywood’s Walk of Fame.

== Discography ==
=== Albums ===
- In the Evening (1984, The New York Music Company)
1. "You're So Romantic" (4:38)
2. "In the Evening" (3:50)
3. "Give Me Love" (3:34)
4. "Evolution" (4:02)
5. "Back to Being in Love" (3:01)
6. "Be Somebody" (3:35)
7. "I'm Your Kind of Girl" (3:55)
8. "B.A.B.Y." (3:15)
9. "Ready or Not" (3:46)
10. "I'm So Glad That We Met" (3:56)

Produced and arranged by Trevor Lawrence

- Sleigh. (2022)
1. “God Rest Ye Merry Gentlemen” (2:11)
2. “Holiday Cheer (We Made It)” (4:03)
3. “Wreck The Halls” feat. B Slade (1:09)
4. “Silent Night” (2:52)
5. “Little Drummer Boy” (6:57)
6. “I Love The Holidays” feat. J Minor 7 (1:09)
7. “Commercial Break” (0:08)
8. “Sleigh. (Jingle Bells)” (3:43)
9. “The Real Meaning” feat. B Slade (5:26)
10. “The Gift” (1:04)
11. “Hark The Herald Angels Sing” (1:10)
12. “O Holy Night” (3:16)
13. “O’ Come All Ye Faithful” feat. Ann Nesby and B Slade (5:24)
14. “Muva Has Spoken” feat. Ivy Ralph O.D. (1:06)
15. “Silent Night Vibes” feat. Hubie Wang (2:05)

=== Singles ===
Title	Year	Peak chart positions						Album
Title	Year	US Dance	US R&B	AUS	BEL (FL)	NLD	UK	Album
"When I First Saw You"	1983	—	50	—	—	—	—	Dreamgirls: Original Broadway Cast Album
"In the Evening"	1984	6	—	—	16	18	64	In the Evening
"You're So Romantic"	1985	37	84	—	—	—	—	In the Evening
"In the Evening (Remix)"	1997	—	—	17	—	—	—	Non-album singles
"Evolution (Remix)"	1998	—	—	—	—	—	—	Non-album singles
"Here Comes the Rain Again"	1999	37	44	—	—	—	—	Non-album singles
"Blood Sweat & Tears (from the series Arcane League of Legends)"	2024	—	—	—	—	—	—	—

== Awards and nominations ==
Year	Award	Category	Nominated work	Result	Ref.
1982	Tony Award	Best Performance by an Actress in a Musical	Dreamgirls	Nominated	
1982	Drama Desk Award	Outstanding Actress in a Musical	Dreamgirls	Nominated	
1989	NAACP Image Awards	Outstanding Actress in a Motion Picture	The Mighty Quinn	Nominated	
1990	Independent Spirit Awards	Best Supporting Female	To Sleep with Anger	Won	
1998	NAACP Image Awards	Outstanding Supporting Actress in a Comedy Series	Moesha	Nominated	
1999	NAACP Image Awards	Outstanding Supporting Actress in a Comedy Series	Moesha	Nominated	
2000	NAACP Image Awards	Outstanding Supporting Actress in a Comedy Series	Moesha	Nominated	
2001	NAACP Image Awards	Outstanding Supporting Actress in a Comedy Series	Moesha	Nominated	
2001	Black Reel Awards	Outstanding Supporting Actress	Deterrence	Nominated	
2002	NAACP Image Awards	Outstanding Supporting Actress in a Comedy Series	Moesha	Nominated	
2022	Black Reel Awards	Outstanding Supporting Actress, Comedy Series	Abbott Elementary	Nominated	
2022	Peabody Award	Entertainment	Abbott Elementary	Won	
2022	Hollywood Critics Association TV Awards	Best Supporting Actress in a Broadcast Network or Cable Series, Comedy	Abbott Elementary	Nominated	
2022	Primetime Emmy Awards	Outstanding Supporting Actress in a Comedy Series	Abbott Elementary	Won	
2022	Creative Coalition	TV Humanitarian Award	Herself	Won	
2022	Elizabeth Taylor AIDS Foundation	Elizabeth Taylor Commitment to End AIDS Award	Herself	Won	
2023	Golden Globe Awards	Best Supporting Actress - Television Series	Abbott Elementary	Nominated	
2023	Independent Spirit Awards	Best Supporting Performance in a New Scripted Series	Abbott Elementary	Nominated	
2023	NAACP Image Awards	Outstanding Supporting Actress in a Comedy Series	Abbott Elementary	Nominated	
2023	Primetime Emmy Awards	Outstanding Supporting Actress in a Comedy Series	Abbott Elementary	Nominated	
2023	Critics' Choice Television Awards	Best Supporting Actress in a Comedy Series	Abbott Elementary	Won	
2023	Screen Actors Guild Awards	Outstanding Performance by an Ensemble in a Comedy Series	Abbott Elementary	Won	
2023	Dorian Awards	Best Supporting TV Performance - Comedy	Abbott Elementary	Nominated	
2023	Black Reel Awards	Outstanding Supporting Performance, Comedy Series	Abbott Elementary	Won	
2024	Hollywood Critics Association TV Awards	Best Supporting Actress in a Broadcast Network or Cable Series, Comedy	Abbott Elementary	Nominated	
2024	Critics' Choice Television Awards	Best Supporting Actress in a Comedy Series	Abbott Elementary	Nominated	
2024	Screen Actors Guild Awards	Outstanding Performance by an Ensemble in a Comedy Series	Abbott Elementary	Nominated	
2024	Daytime Emmy Awards	Outstanding Daytime Special	Unexpected (as executive producer)	Nominated	
2024	Black Reel Awards	Ruby Dee Humanitarian Award	Herself	Won	
2024	Black Reel Awards	Outstanding Supporting Performance in a Comedy Series	Abbott Elementary	Nominated	
2024	Primetime Emmy Awards	Outstanding Supporting Actress in a Comedy Series	Abbott Elementary	Nominated	
2024	NAACP Image Awards	Outstanding Supporting Actress in a Comedy Series	Abbott Elementary	Nominated	
2025	Screen Actors Guild Awards	Outstanding Performance by an Ensemble in a Comedy Series	Abbott Elementary	Nominated	
2025	Primetime Emmy Awards	Outstanding Supporting Actress in a Comedy Series	Abbott Elementary	Nominated	
2025	NAACP Image Awards	Outstanding Supporting Actress in a Comedy Series	Abbott Elementary	Nominated	
2025	Black Reel Awards	Outstanding Supporting Performance in a Comedy Series	Abbott Elementary	Nominated	
2026	Screen Actors Guild Awards	Outstanding Performance by an Ensemble in a Comedy Series	Abbott Elementary	Nominated	.
