= The Plot Against Harry =

1971 film by Michael Roemer

- Film poster
- Directed by: Michael Roemer
- Written by: Michael Roemer
- Produced by: Michael Roemer
- Starring: Martin Priest
- Cinematography: Robert M. Young
- Edited by: Georges Klotz
- Production company: King Screen Productions
- Distributed by: New Yorker Films
- Release dates: 27 January 1971 (Seattle (Blue Mouse Theatre)); 13 September 1989 (United States)
- Running time: 81 minutes
- Country: United States
- Language: English

The Plot Against Harry is an American comedy film directed by Michael Roemer. The plot involves Harry Plotnick, a small-time Jewish gangster living in a now largely Hispanic and African American New York neighborhood, playing the numbers game after being released from prison. The film was not widely released but slowly has gained a cult following after rediscovery by film aficionados and the Criterion Collection.

== Background ==
Filming took place in 1969, and the film played for one week at the Blue Mouse Theatre in Seattle in January 1971, but it was not given a general theatrical release until 1989.

== Plot ==
Harry Plotnick, a small-time Jewish mobster, is released from a two decades prison stint, his cold heart as mean and callous as ever. His chauffeur tells him that his numbers racket has been largely absorbed by other parties. He tries to regain control, but his time controlling his neighborhood streets appears to be over. He is at loose ends until his ex-brother-in-law, Leo, mentions that the catering service/Jewish event center that Leo manages is about to be bought by a large corporation. Harry convinces Leo to partner with him – instead of allowing the corporation into the neighborhood, he'll provide the purchase price and Leo will run the operation. The purchase is completed, and as Harry attends the various Jewish ceremonies held at his new business – weddings, bar mitzvahs, even a circumcision – he begins to feel connected with the New York Jewish community that he had largely abandoned in his youth.

He is also literally thrown into contact with his now-grown daughter, whom he had last seen when she was three, and with his ex-wife. The 'literal' part occurs when he, in a brief flareup of road rage, crashes into the car carrying his ex-family members. Later he is also introduced to a previously-unknown daughter; we learn that his wife was (unknowingly) pregnant when she left him some two decades before.

Harry's family members continue to drift through his orbit as they participate in various Jewish gatherings. Unexpectedly his younger daughter asks for permission to temporarily lodge with him. During this time, a trip to a hospital emergency room leads to a (possibly erroneous) diagnosis of a dangerously-enlarged heart, which may soon fell him. This apparently accelerates his desire for redemption.

An unexpected subpoena compels Harry to testify before a state panel that is probing the New York gambling underworld. He is maneuvered into admitting his ownership of the catering business, which had been publicly touted as belonging to the brother-in-law for reasons of community propriety. The panel immediately subpoenas the financial records of this business, to determine if it is indeed legitimate in all respects. When Harry's chauffeur Max (who was also the financial-records maintenance man during the gambling days) produces the records for Harry's inspection, there is an immediate problem: Max has carefully noted the names and amounts of all bribes and under-the-table payoffs. At this revelation, Harry blows up and tells Max to get out of his life.

Max decides to burn the books rather than let them be seized by the state. The attempt is botched; it merely leads to a temporary fire-alarm evacuation of the hotel where Harry has been staying. The husband of Harry's elder daughter is initially accused of directing the book-burning, turning Harry's ex-wife fully against him; Harry soon learns that his ex-wife has informed his parole officer of violations (meeting with his criminal associates).

Harry is soon approached by his younger daughter with a request for a "really large" favor, and he begins to realize the humanity that has been gradually surfacing inside since his prison release. When he collapses for a second time during a live telethon raising money for heart disease, he believes he is dying. As a final gesture, he makes two increasingly large donations to the cause. In an ambulance to the hospital, with many family members as witness, he also takes the blame for the book-burning.

At the hospital, a doctor tells Harry his heart is just fine. His only problem is constipation. With much more life left to live, he has lost a good deal of his money. He will also return to prison for a year for the arson he didn't commit, but he seems reconciled with the price of re-entering his community with his head held high.

== Accolades ==
The film was screened out of competition at the 1990 Cannes Film Festival. It was also nominated for six Film Independent Spirit Awards.

== Cast ==
- Henry Nemo as Max
- Martin Priest as Harry Plotnick
- Ben Lang as Leo
- Maxine Woods as Kay
- Jacques Taylor as Jack
- Jean Leslie as Irene
- Ellen Herbert as Mae
- Sandra Kazan as Margie
- Ronald Coralian as Mel Skolnik
- Max Ulman as Sidney
- Julius Harris as Big Julie
- Christopher Cross as Telethon MC

== Reception ==
On the review aggregator website Rotten Tomatoes, 100% of 9 critics' reviews are positive, with an average rating of 7.9/10.
