= The Hydropathes =

19th-century Paris literary club

Les Hydropathes
- Les Hydropathes
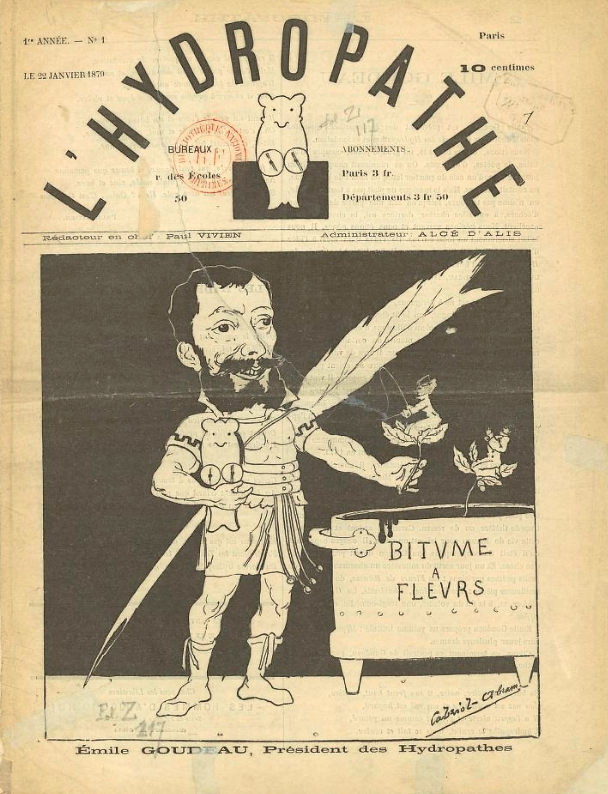
- L'Hydropathe, No. 1 du 22 janvier 1879, avec Émile Goudeau, fondateur, caricaturé par Georges Lorin, dit Cabriol.
- Formation: 11 October 1878
- Founder: Émile Goudeau
- Dissolved: June 1880
- Type: Literary club
- Purpose: Celebration of literature and poetry; satirical performances
- Headquarters: Latin Quarter (early), Montmartre (later)
- Location: Paris, France
- Region served: Paris

The Hydropathes was a Parisian literary club founded by the French novelist and poet Émile Goudeau and primarily active between 1878 and 1880. The club published the journal "L'Hydropathe", which was later renamed "Le Tout-Paris". It is considered to be the origin of fumism and passed his traditions on to the Hirsutes, Le Chat-Noir and "le Décadent". Jules Lévy, founder of the Arts Incohérents, was a member.

== History ==
=== Formation ===
After the Franco-Prussian War, many literary clubs of extremely varied longevity and importance were created in Paris. The Hydropathes' club was one of the most important due to its longevity and the artists that participated in it.

The club was created by Émile Goudeau on October 11, 1878. Goudeau stated that, due to the group's lack of a "common programme", they simply chose "a name that wouldn’t compromise any of the society’s future doctrines or possible apostasies". Thus, the name's ambiguity lead to the proposal of several etymologies and interpretations, with many of them related to water due to the use of "hydro-" in the name. The name has been interpreted as a play on words deconstructing Goudeau's name into "Gout d'eau" (in English "the taste of water"). A "Blague Hydropathe" implied that the name came from the fact that the club met at the Hôtel Boileau, transforming its name into "Boire l'eau" (in English "to drink water"). However, this explanation is considered as a subtle attempt at mocking readers. Many believe that the name expresses the group's aversion to drinking water, as Montmartre was characterized by excess and, in particular, the consumption of absinthe. Finally, it has been suggested that the name may be a reference to the hydra, using it either as a symbol of revolution and anarchy or a representation of "bourgeois conformity".

The group began holding meetings, that they referred to as "séances", on every Wednesday and Friday evening.

=== L'Hydropathe ===
==== Beginnings ====
The club's journal, named "L'Hydropathe", began production in January 1879, with its first edition being published on 22 January. It was released bimonthly and had a mostly consistent structure. Each edition's cover had a caricature portrait of a Hydropathe drawn by Georges Lorin (also known as "Cabriol") and contained a mix of poetry, prose and illustrations. Regarding its organization, "Goudeau acted as Editor-in-Chief, Paul Vivien as Chief Administrator, and the role of administrator was shared between Alce d’Alis, Jules Jouy, Paul Allais, Émile Cohl and Maurice Petit".

==== Renaming as "Tout-Paris" and End ====
After publishing 32 editions, it was decided that the ideas that existed surrounding "L'Hydropathe", were beginning to limit artists. Because of this, its editors decided to expand the team, start publishing weekly and, most importantly, renaming the journal "Tout-Paris". The group decided to leave the Latin Quarter and establish themselves in the hills of Montmartre. On his memoir, Goudeau states these decisions were taken due to the fact that a man with the pseudonym "Joinville" expressed interest in helping the journal grow sginificantly and relocating it on 40 Rue de Richelieu.

However, by leaving the Latin Quarter, the journal became separated from its audience composed of local students and also separated itself from the "séances" that helped to make it popular, tied it to comperary ideas and served as a source of funding and inspiration. This meant the journal was dependent on Joinville's investments allowing it to build a new audience. For this reason, once Joinville's fortune was lost on in a game of cards, the journal had stop publishing in June 1880. It only released five editions under its new name, the covers for these were illustrated by Eugène Bataille (also known as "Sapeck").

=== The End of The Hydropathes ===
Throughout the group's history, there were quite a few occasions in which Goudeau had to function as an authoritarian figure in order to control a "tumultuous assembly". However, this problem worsened over time, with the group having multiple encounters with the police. Goudeau reached his breaking point when, in June 1880, a group of artists decided to set off fireworks in the middle of a "séance", marking their end.

=== The Hirsutes, Le Chat-Noir and Le Décadent ===
After the group separated, its traditions were passed onto "three direct heirs: the Hirsutes, Le Chat-Noir and le Décadent".

In late September 1881, in an attempt to reunite the Hydropathes, Maurice Petit held a meeting with Léo Trézenik, Desbouiges, Collignon and Jules Jouy They were also joined by Goudeau and Moynet. The group was looking for a new name and Goudeau suggested "Hirsutes", it was accepted and Petit was chosen as president. While the project seemed hopeless after its first advertisements yielded no results, its Friday "séances" quickly gained popularity, causing the group to grow and change meeting locations several times to accommodate a larger crowd.

In November of the same year, the cabaret Le Chat-Noir opened and Goudeau, along with other ex-Hydropathes, began performing there. In the cabaret, the dynamic between artists and their audience changed. Artists were respected and interacted in a private room while customers were often insulted, being addressed as "mon cochon" (meaning "pig" in english). Over time, Petit lost popularity, was forced to abdicate the presidency and Goudeau took over. On October 2, 1882, Jules Lévy, an ex-Hydropathe and founding member of the Hirsutes, staged "an exhibition of drawings by people who can't draw", which marked the beginning of the Arts Incohérents. By January 1883, Goudeau had completely lost interest in the Hirsutes, choosing to focus on Le Chat-Noir. This was a sentiment shared by many other members. The final "séance" was held by a single member in May of the same year.

After these events, several short-lived publications appeared in Montmartre. Among these, one of the most important was "Le Décadent". It started out as a weekly publication and its first edition was published on April 10, 1886, under the direction of Anatole Baju. "Le Décadent" gained popularity very quickly and, starting with its 36th edition, became longer and was published bimonthly. At the time, its writers were: "Paul Verlaine, Maurice du Plessys, Laurent Tailhade, Léo d’Arkaï, Albert Aurier, Ernest Raynaud, Jean Lorrain, F.-A. Cazals, Boyer d’Agen, Louis Pilate de Brinn’Gaubast, Jules Renard, Arthur Rimbaud". It is important to mention the fact that, in Rimbaud's case, some of the poems that were published were fake and they were attributed to him were created in order to attract attention. On April 15, 1889, "Le Décadent" began being published under the name "La France Littéraire" and Baju had the intention to shift its focus towards sociology and politics. This change was not well received, the publication lost popularity and many writers abandoned it. This marked the end of "Le Décadent", which ceased publication under its new name on May 15, 1889.

=== 1928 Reunion ===
On October 17, 1928, Jules Lévy invited former Hydropathes to celebrate the club's 50th anniversary in the amphitheater of the Sorbonne. Fifty-four members attended the event, which was featured in the front page of Le Figaro.

== The Hydropathes and Fumism ==
The creation of fumism is attributed to the Hydropathes. In the eighth edition of L'Hydropathe's second year, Georges Fragerolle published an article titled "Fumisme". In it, the movement's main thesis, as well as a brief description of it, can be found. Its thesis is presented in the form of an epigraph attributed to Émile Zola: «The arts must become fumism <turn into smoke>, or they will not exist». Fragerolle states that fumism:

is to wit what operetta is to opéra-bouffe, caricature to cartoon, prunes to castor oil. To be considered a wit, it is sometimes enough to be an ass in a lion's skin; to be a good fumiste, it is often required to be a lion in an ass's skin. In the former case, the effect is direct, in the latter it is once, twice, often ten times reflected.

In his account, Goudeau mentions that among the Hydropathes, the "fumistes" were led by Sapeck and mocked everything, a behavior that exacerbated the group's internal conflicts. Scholars have stated that "Allais, Salis, and Sapeck lived their Fumisme", shocking their audience through the transgression of certain norms.

== Notable Hydropathes ==
The following is non-comprehensive list of notable Hydropathes:

- Paul Arène
- François Coppée
- Alphonse Allais
- Paul-Émile Allais
- Sarah Bernhardt
- Léon Bloy
- Paul Bourget
- Ernest Cabaner
- Coquelin Cadet
- Félicien Champsaur
- Henri Chassin
- Émile Cohl
- Charles Cros
- Michel-Eudes de L'Hay
- Louis Eugène, dit Veuzy
- Charles Frémine
- André Gill
- Ernest Grenet-Dancourt
- Jules Jouy
- Jules Laforgue
- Eugène Le Mouël
- Luigi Loir
- Maurice Mac-Nab
- Achille Mélandri
- Ernest Monin
- Édouard Norès
- Jean Rameau
- Jean Richepin
- Gustave Rivet
- Georges Rodenbach
- Maurice Rollinat
- Camille de Sainte-Croix
- Laurent Tailhade
- Georges Tiret-Bognet
- Joseph Uzanne
- Léon Valade
- Henri Vaudémont
- Gabriel Vicaire
- Gaston Vuidet

== Other groups ==
Many official associations formed in accordance to the "Loi du 1er juillet 1901 relative au contrat d'association" ("Law of July 1, 1901 on the contract of association", in English) honor the Hydropathes through their names and activities

- The "Club des Hydropathes de Périgneux" ("Club of the Hydropathes of Périgneux" in English) was created in 2001 and officially established in 2003 with the purpose of promoting francophone poetry. Its president is Maurice Millet and its magazine has published 238 issues containing a total of 4 647 poems.
- An association named "Les Hydropathes" was formed in the Territoire de Belfort in 2011. It takes part in various festive activities and local events to raise money for charity.
- The group "Hydropathes", created in Paris in 2013, organizes events and participates in activities to promote the arts and culture.
- The "Compagnie Hydropathes" was created in the Oloron-Sainte-Marie Sub-Prefecture in 2024. It is involved in a wide range of activities relating to the creation and presentation of live shows in their various forms (puppetry, music, etc.).

Although it is named "Les Hydropathes", the sports and outdoor activities association formed in the Lisieux Sub-Prefecture in 2015 has no ties to the group. Its name may be a reference to the water sports practiced in it.
