= Album primo-avrilesque =

1897 monograph by Alphonse Allais

Album primo-avrilesque is a monograph by French writer, artist and humourist Alphonse Allais. The slim volume of 26 octavo landscape pages, 18.5 by 12 centimetres (7.3 in × 4.7 in), bound with card, was published by Paul Ollendorff in Paris on 1 April 1897, and was sold for one franc. The work is generally known by its French title, which may be translated into English as "April Fool-ish album".

== Description ==
The artist's book includes eight printed pieces: a series of seven monochrome artworks, each a solid block of a single colour – black, blue, green, yellow (or brown), red, grey, white – displayed within an ornamental frame, followed by the score for a silent funeral march, with blank staves covering two pages. Each piece was given a humorous title in French.

The booklet also includes two prefaces in French, one for the monochrome artworks and one for the funeral march. In the preface to the monochromes, Allais wrote that other painters were "ridicules artisans qui ont besoin de mille couleurs différentes pour exprimer leurs pénibles conceptions" [ridiculous craftsmen who need a thousand different colours to express their painful conceptions] and that his ideal artist employed "pour une toile une couleur ... monochroïdal" [for one canvas one colour ... monochromatic]. In the preface to the funeral march, for "un grand homme sourd" [a great deaf man], Allais wrote that "les grandes douleurs sont muettes" [great pains are silent].

== Background ==
Allais exhibited his first monochrome artwork at the second Salon des Arts Incohérents in Paris in 1883: his all-white Première communion de jeunes filles chlorotiques par temps de neige [First communion of anaemic young girls in snowy weather] – a blank sheet of white Bristol paper, attached to a wall with four drawing pins. He showed another monochrome work, the all-red Récolte de tomates sur le bord de la mer Rouge par des cardinaux apoplectiques [Apoplectic cardinals harvesting tomatoes on the shore of the Red Sea], at the third Incoherents show in 1884, along with his silent funeral march. The exhibition catalogue notes that the red monochrome is an offering of Peter's pence to Pope Leo XIII.

Allais's monochromes were inspired by an all-black artwork exhibited by his friend Paul Bilhaud at the first Salon des Arts Incohérents in 1882 under the title Combat de nègres dans un tunnel [Negroes fighting in a tunnel], which had been intended by Bilhaud as a satirical response to Impressionism. Bilhaud was not the first to create an all-black artwork: for example, Robert Fludd published an image of Darkness in his 1617 book on the origin and structure of the cosmos; Laurence Sterne included a black page in his novel Tristram Shandy in 1760, immediately after the death of Parson Yorick; and Bertall published his black Vue de La Hogue (effet de nuit) in Les Omnibus no.7 in 1843, satirising the very dark canvas exhibited at the 1843 Salon by Jean-Louis Petit. In Either/Or (1843), Søren Kierkegaard gives the story of an artist painting the Israelites crossing the Red Sea, painting a wall red, and contending that the Israelites had crossed and the Egyptians had drowned.'

== Reception ==
Allais's joke was repeated by Émile Cohl, himself formerly a member of the Incoherents, in a cinema film in 1910, Le Peintre néo-impressionniste [The Neo-Impressionistic Painter], which included intertitle cards introducing monochrome presentations, such as Un cardinal mangeant une langouste aux tomates sur les bords de la Mer Rouge [A cardinal eating a lobster and tomatoes by the Red Sea], or Chinois transportant du maïs sur le Fleuve Jaune par un temps d'été ensoleillé ["Chinamen" transporting corn on the Yellow River in the sunny summer].

The publication of Allais's book of monochrome artworks predated Kazimir Malevich's Black Square and Red Square printings by nearly two decades. It was reported in 2015 that X-ray analysis of one version of Malevich's Black Square had uncovered a hand-written inscription in the white border that may read "Negroes battling in a cave", suggesting Malevich was familiar with Allais's earlier work.

The blank score of Allais's silent funeral march came five decades before John Cage's soundless 4′33″. Cage has denied being aware of Allais's work before composing his piece.

== Gallery ==
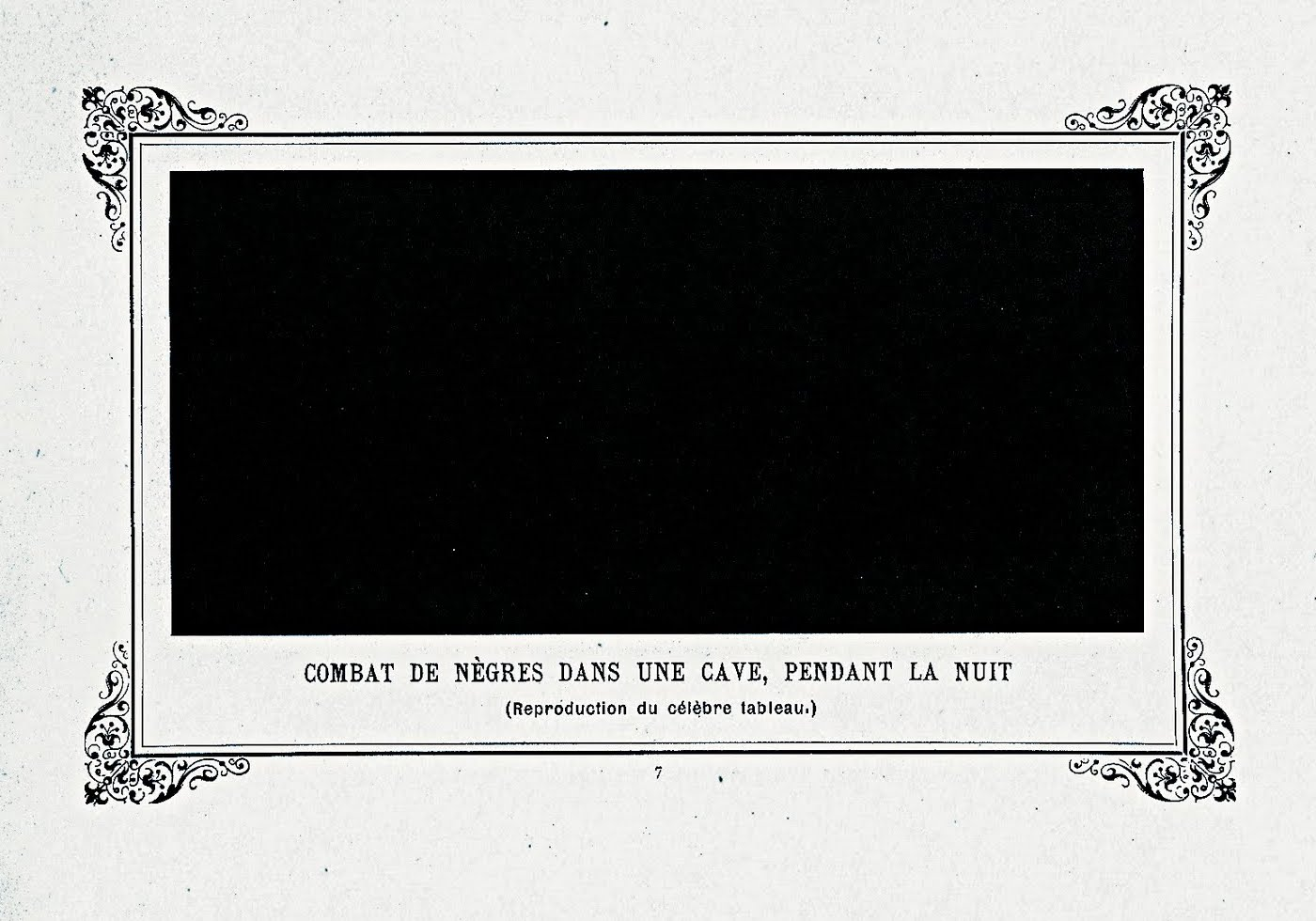
Combat de nègres dans une cave, pendant la nuit [Negroes fighting in a cellar, at night]

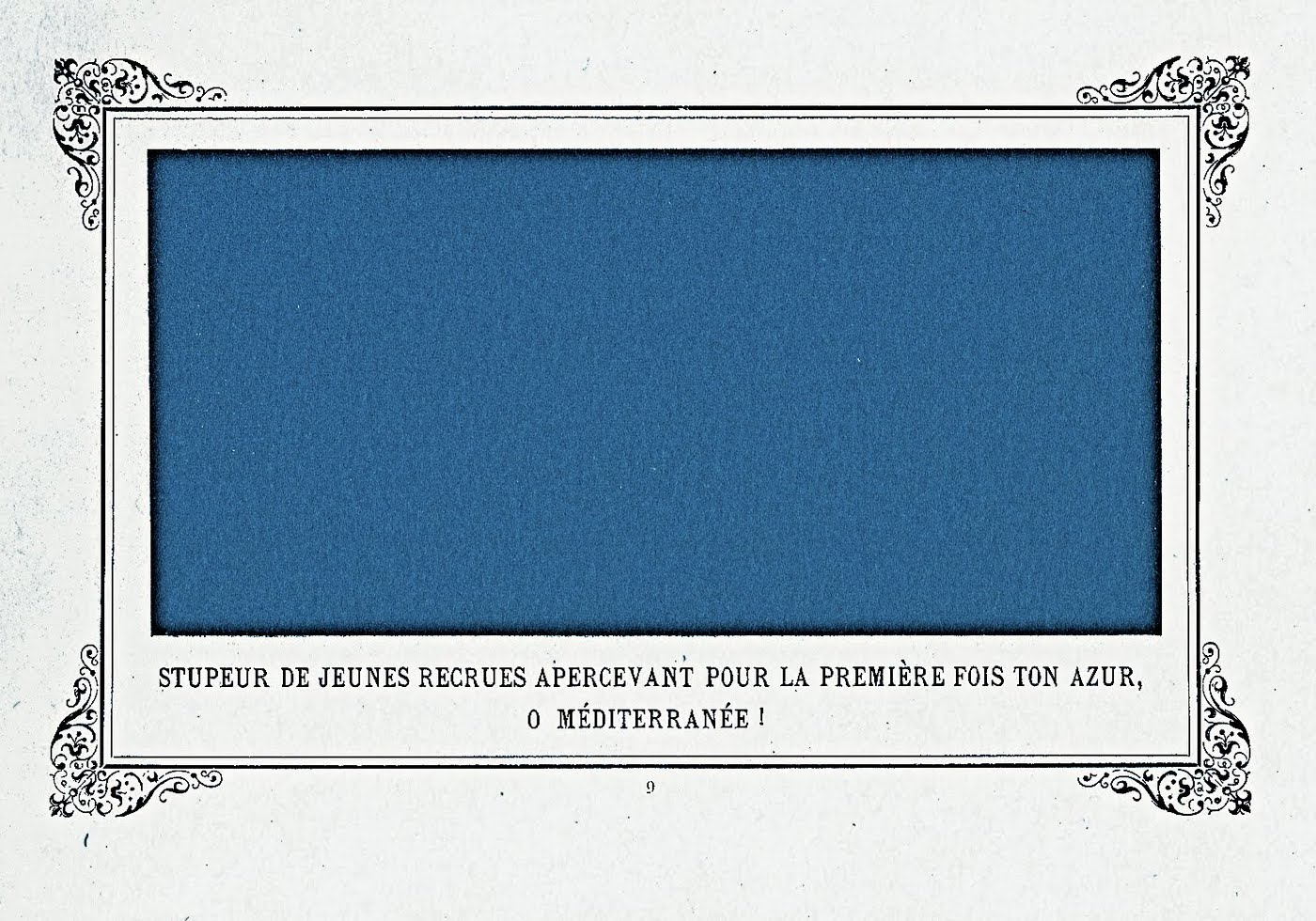
Stupeur de jeunes recrues apercevant pour la première fois ton azur, O Méditerranée! [Astonishment of young naval recruits seeing for the first time your blue, O Mediterranean Sea!]

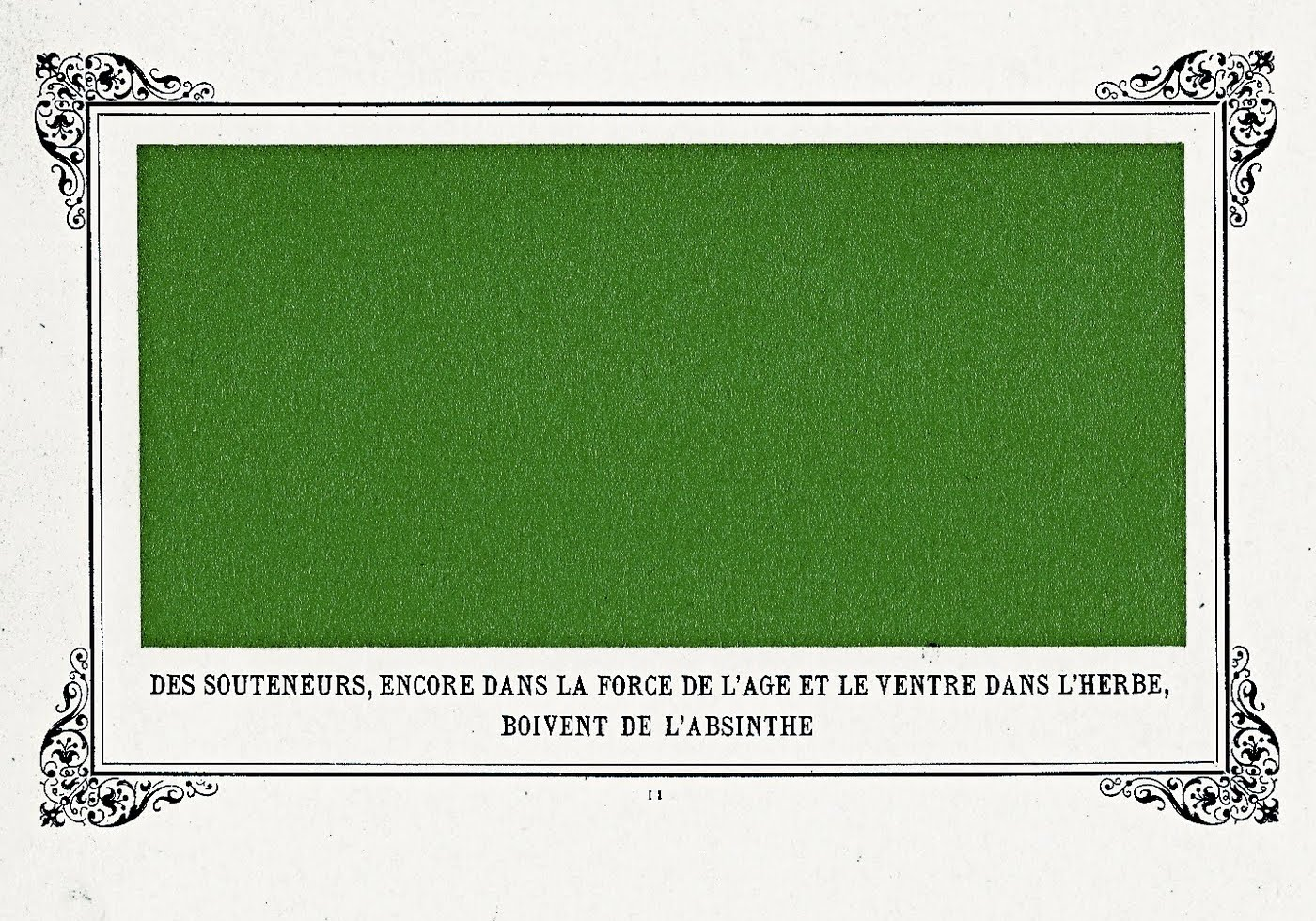
Des souteneurs, encore dans la force de l'âge et le ventre dans l'herbe, boivent de l'absinthe [Pimps, still in the prime of life and stomachs on the grass, drinking absinthe]

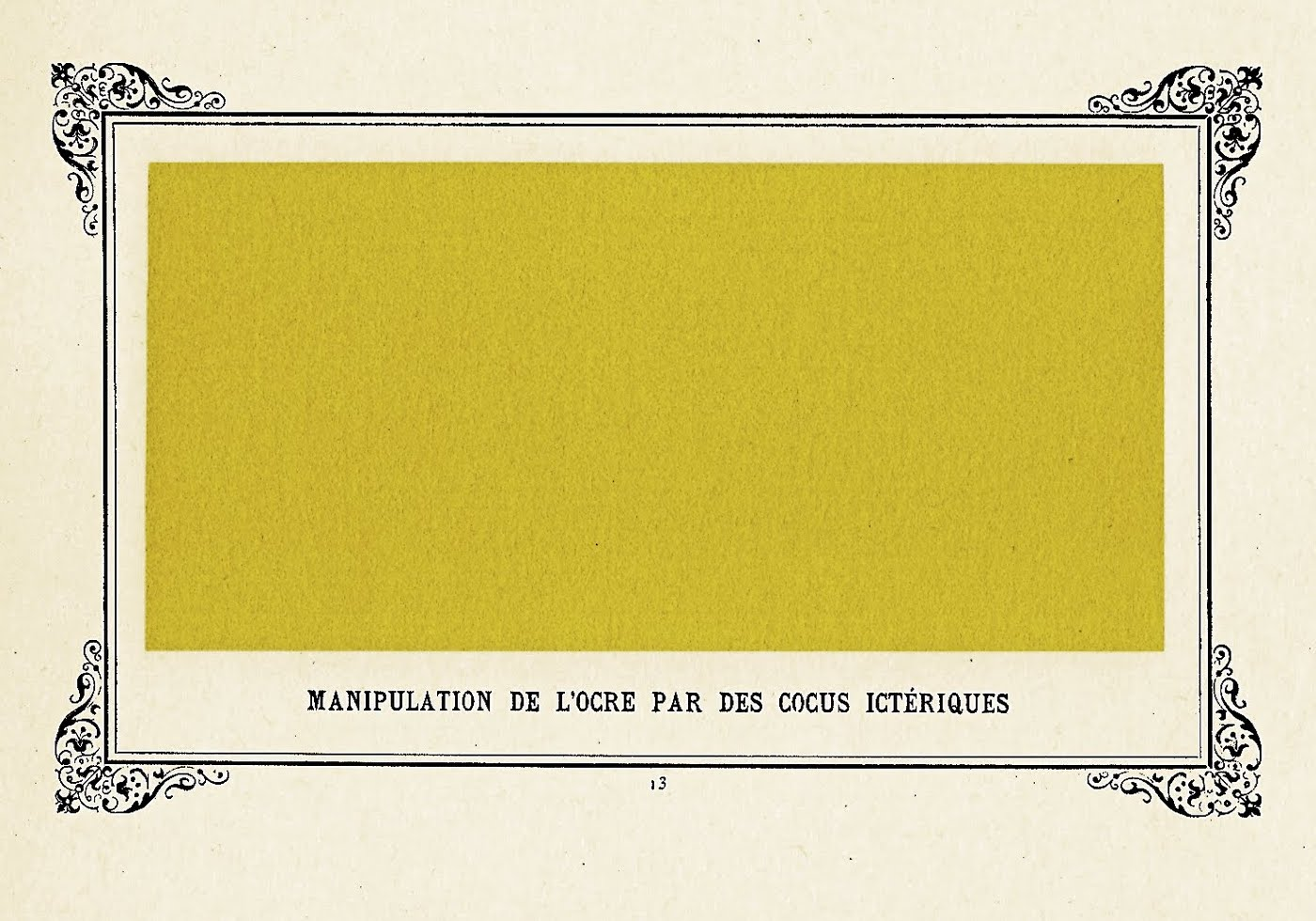
Manipulation de l'ocre par des cocus ictériques [Jaundiced cuckolds handling ochre]

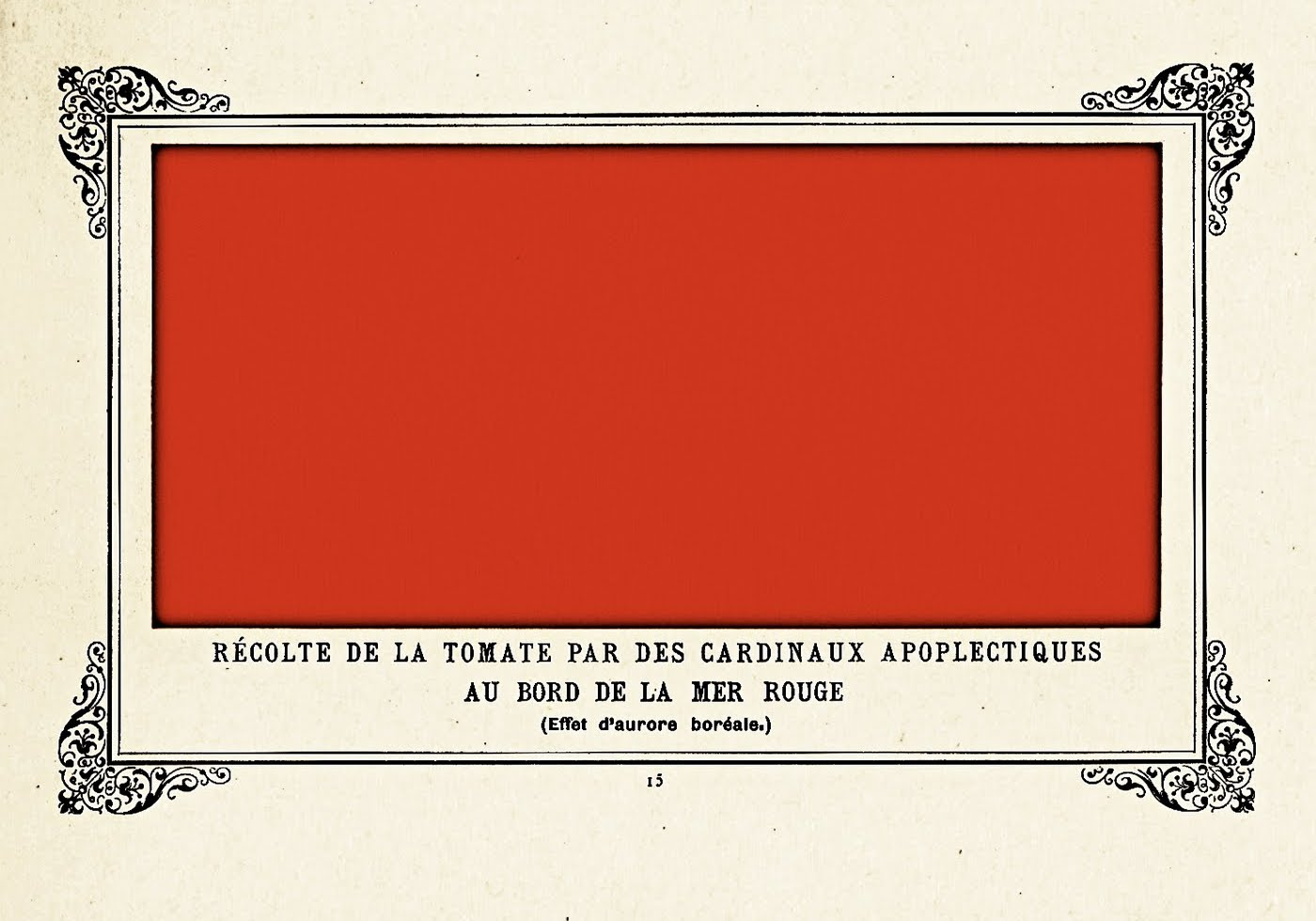
Récolte de la tomate par des cardinaux apoplectiques au bord de la mer Rouge (Effet d'aurore boréale) [Apoplectic cardinals harvesting tomatoes on the shore of the Red Sea (effect of the Aurora Borealis)]

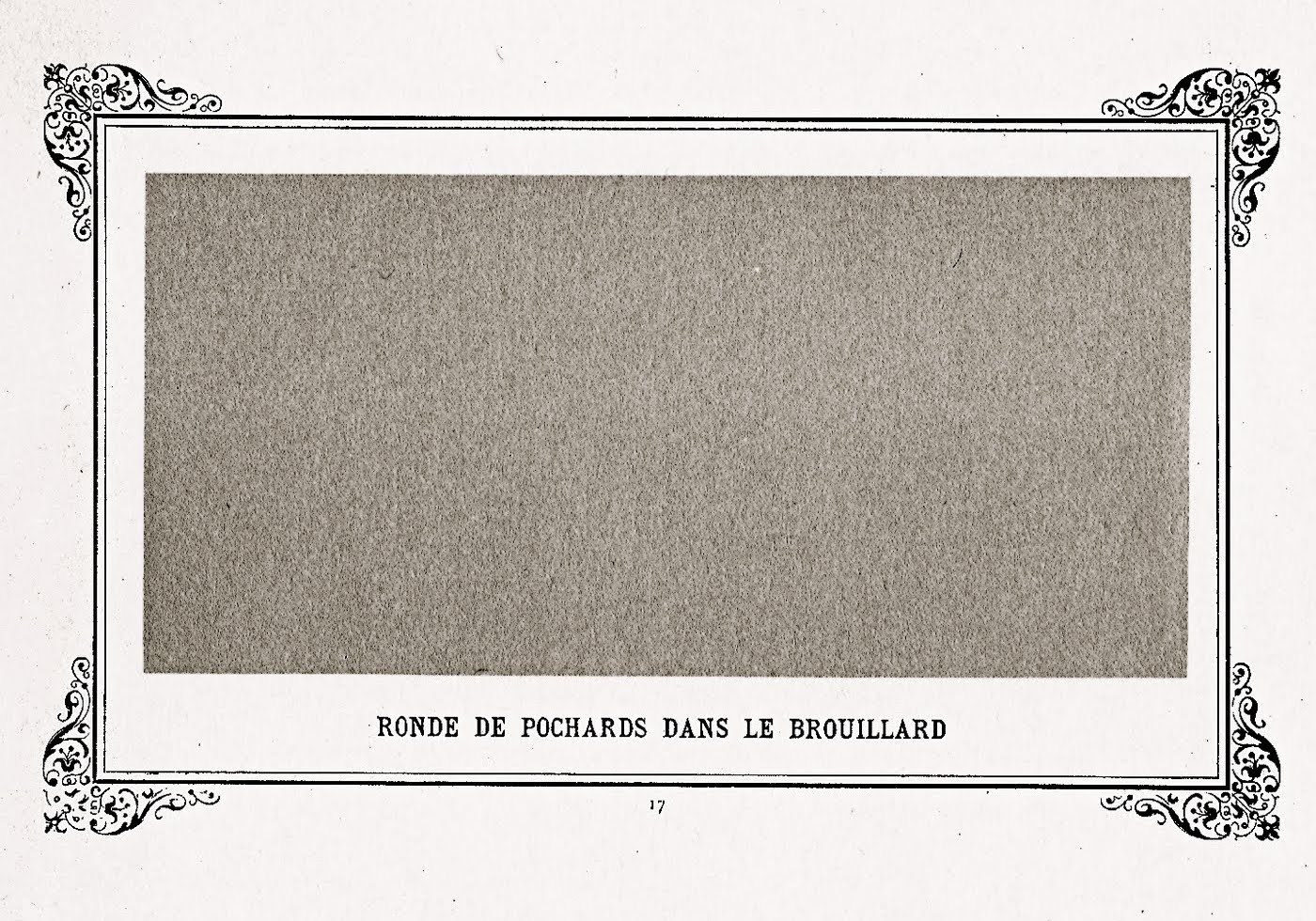
Ronde de pochards dans le brouillard [Dance of drunks in the fog]

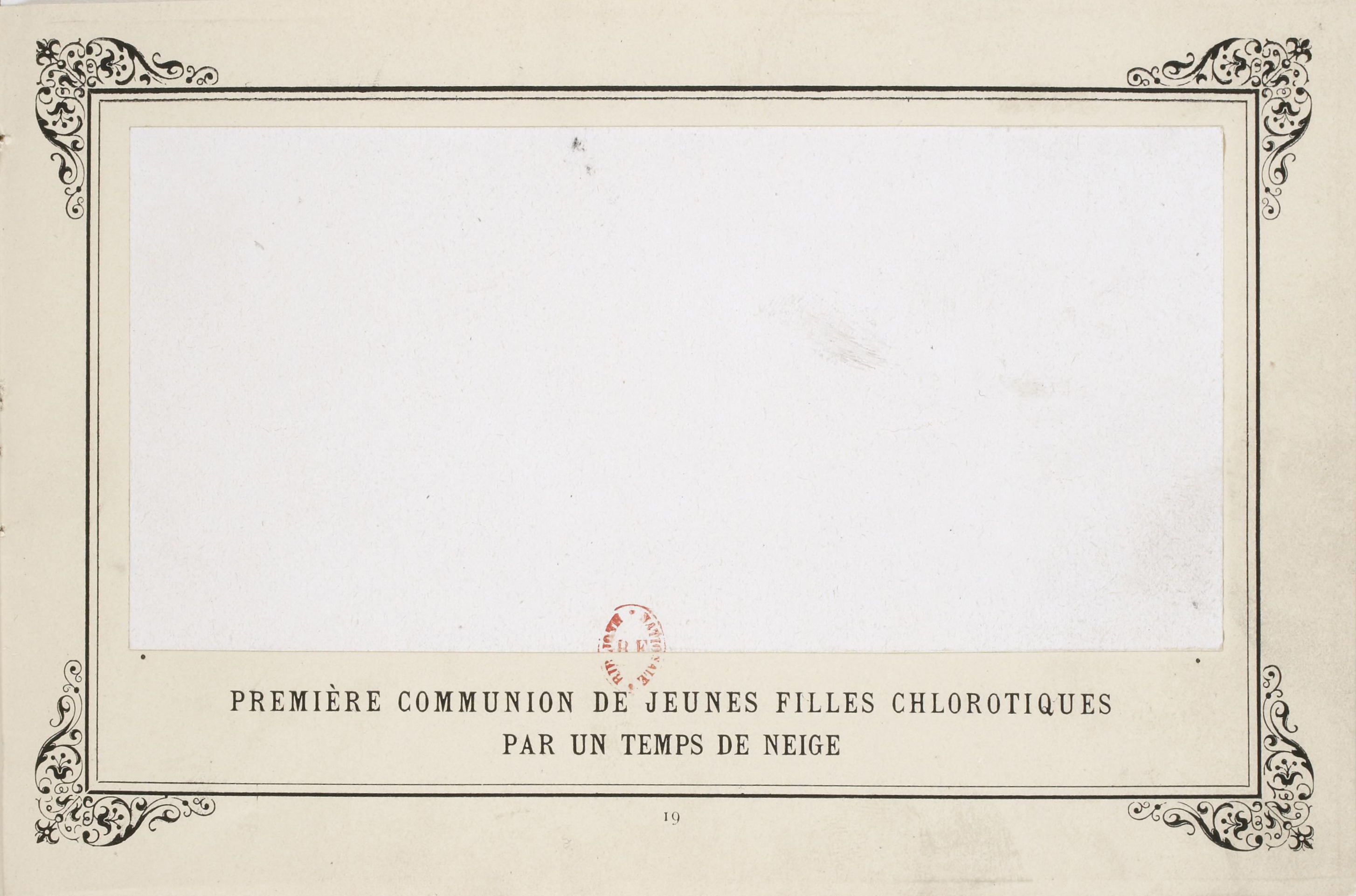
Première communion de jeunes filles chlorotiques par un temps de neige [First communion of anaemic young girls in snowy weather]

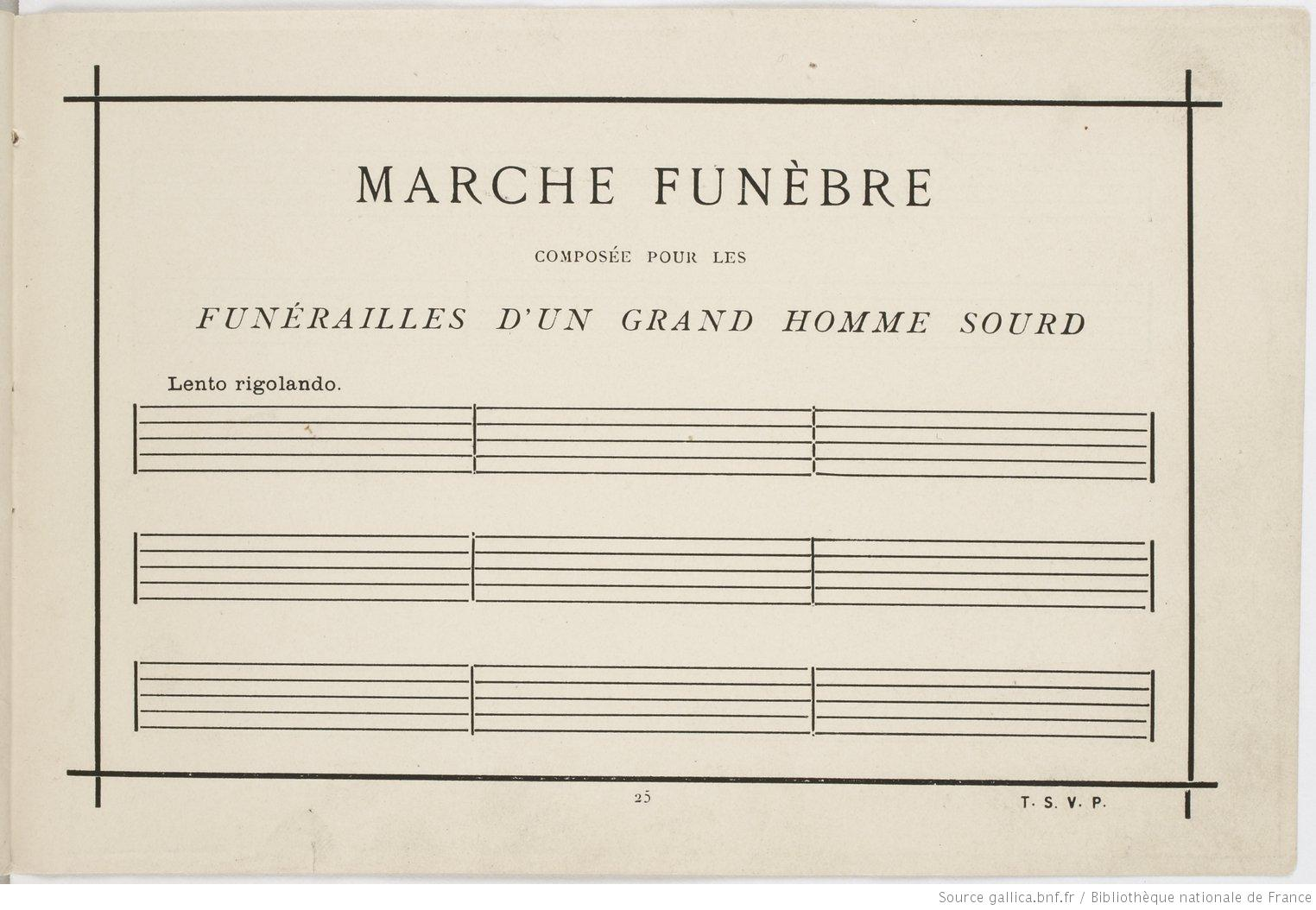
Marche funèbre, composée pour les funérailles d'un grand homme sourd [Funeral March, composed for the obsequies of a great deaf man]

=== Similar works ===
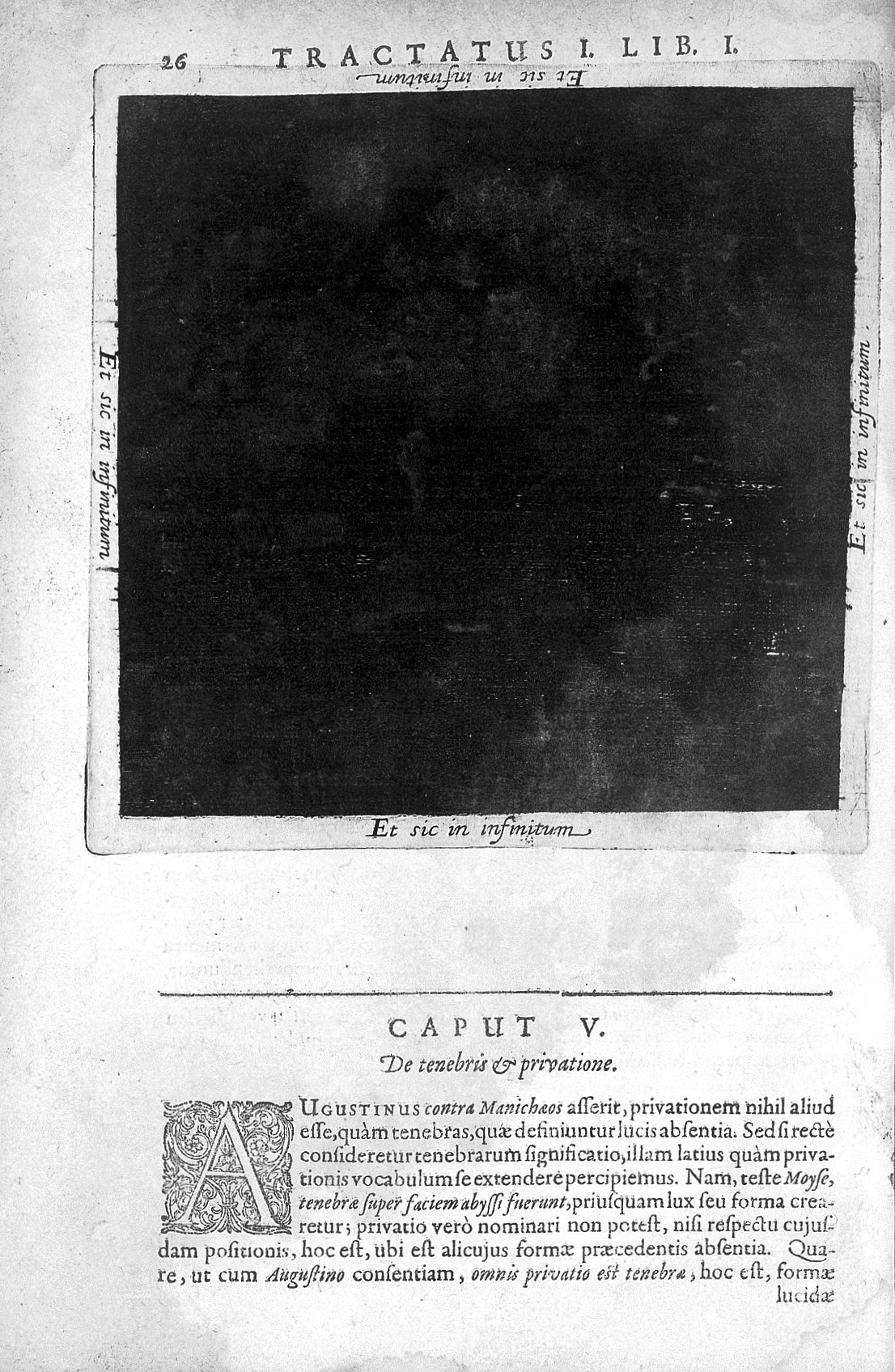
Robert Fludd, "Darkness", from his book Utriusque Cosmi ..., 1617

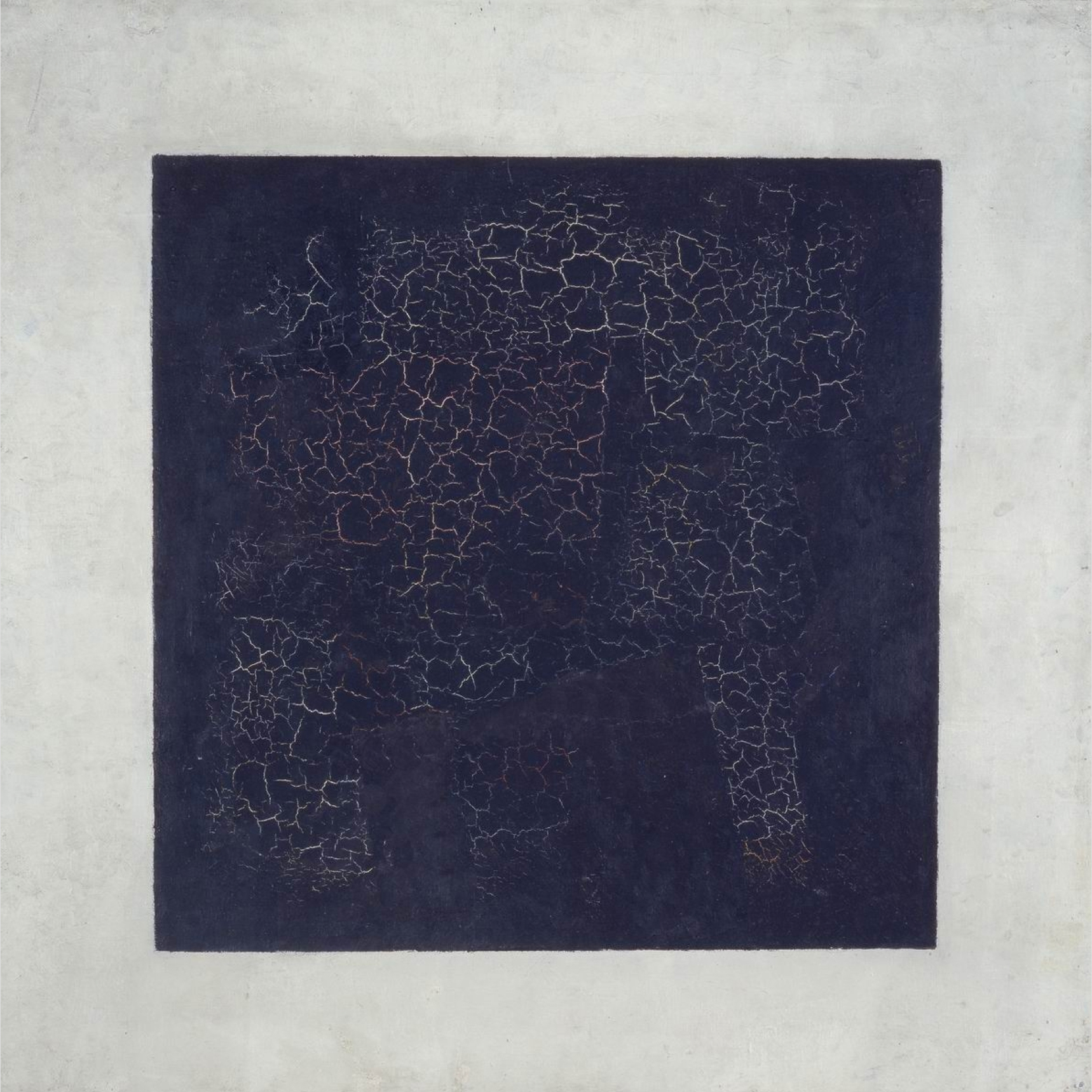
Kazimir Malevich, Black Square, 1915

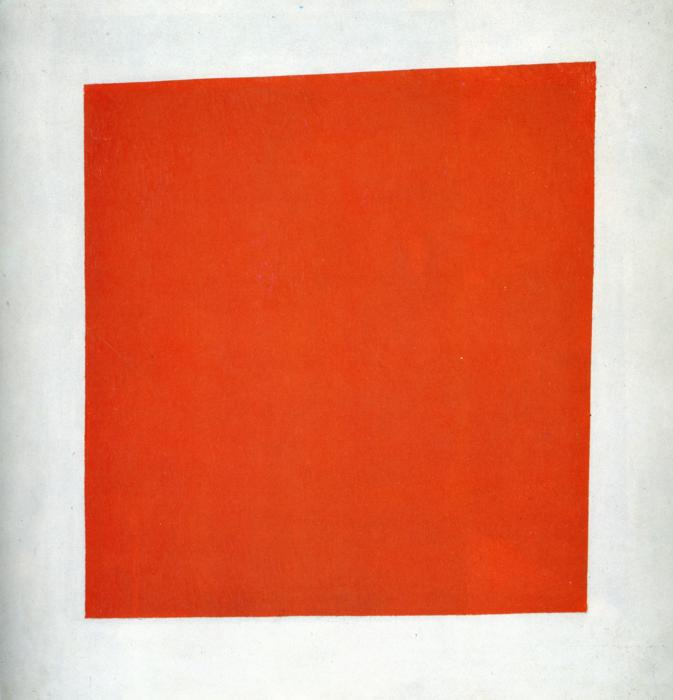
Kazimir Malevich, Red Square, 1915

see also some monochromatic paintings by Yves Klein.
