= Maurice Rollinat =

French poet and musician

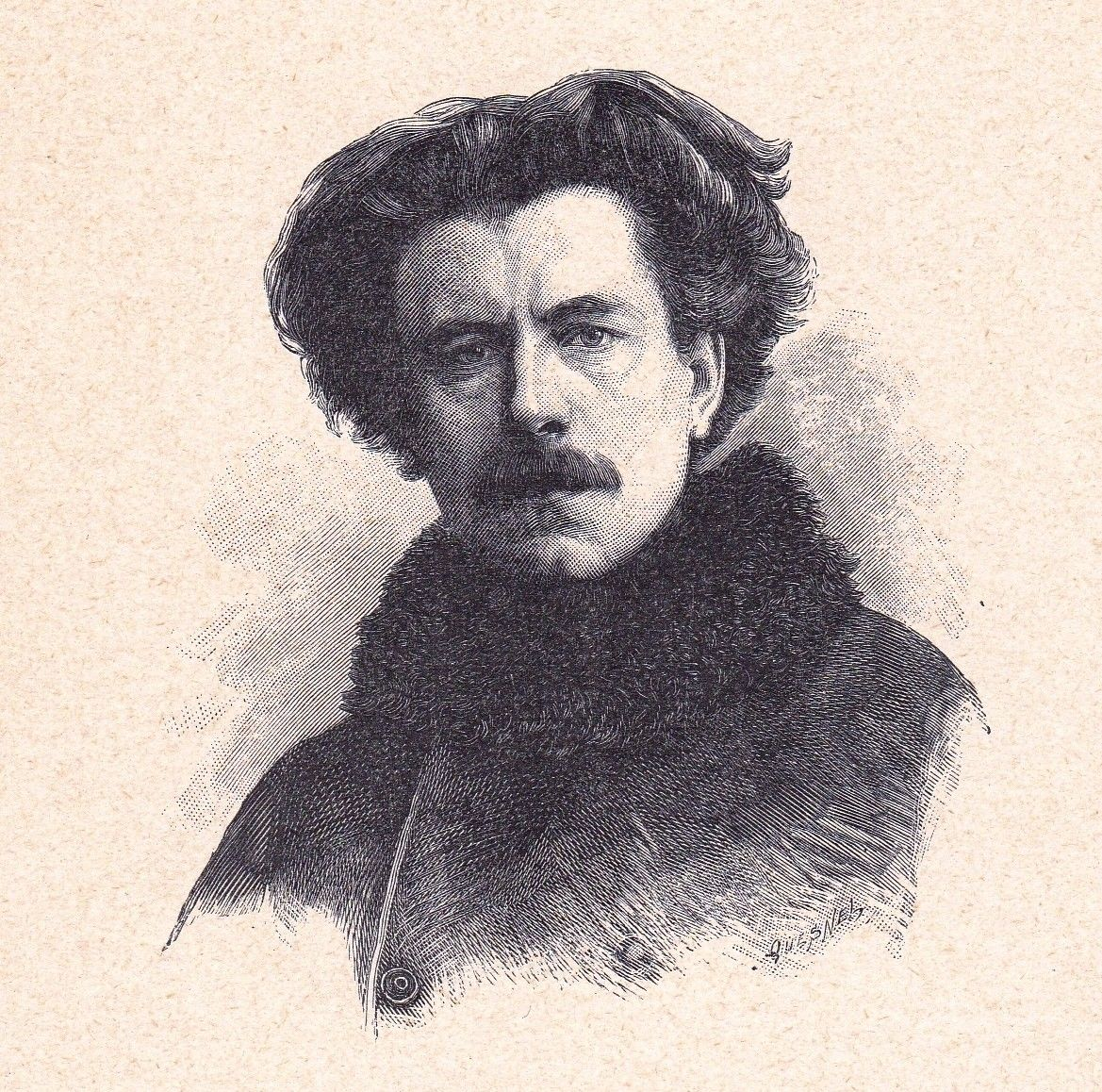
Maurice Rollinat, 1846-1903

Maurice Rollinat (December 29, 1846 in Châteauroux, Indre – October 26, 1903 in Ivry-sur-Seine) was a French poet and musician.

== Early works ==
His father represented Indre in the National Assembly of 1848, and was a friend of George Sand, whose influence is very marked in young Rollinat's first volume, Dans les brandes (1877), and to whom it was dedicated.

== Brief fame ==
Maurice Rollinat

After its publication, he abandoned realism and worked in a very different manner. He joined a literary circle that called themselves Les Hydropathes, founded by Émile Goudeau, an anti-clerical group with ties to the Decadent literary movement. Under their influence, he wrote the poems that made his reputation. In Les Névroses, with the sub-title Les Âmes, Les Luxures, Les Refuges, Les Spectres, Les Ténèbres, he showed himself as a disciple of Charles Baudelaire. He constantly returns in these poems to the physical horrors of death, and is obsessed by unpleasant images. Less outré in sentiment are L'Abîme (1886), La Nature, and a book of children's verse, Le Livre de la Nature (1893).

He was a musician as well as a poet, and set many of his songs to music. Several evenings a week, Rollinat would appear at the cabaret Le Chat Noir, and there he would perform his poems with piano accompaniment. His gaunt and pale appearance made his portrait a favourite subject for a number of painters, and the startling subjects of his verses brought him short fame during his lifetime; at the height of his popularity he drew a number of celebrities to the cabaret to see him perform; among them were Leconte de Lisle and Oscar Wilde. Rollinat's friend Jules Barbey d'Aurevilly wrote that "Rollinat might be Baudelaire's superior in the sincerity and depth of his diabolism".

On January 19, 1878, Maurice Rollinat married Marie Sérullaz. But dissensions appeared in the couple and they separated in February 1882.

In September 1883, Maurice Rollinat left Paris with Cécile Pouettre and settled in Fresselines in Creuse, where they lived for twenty years. Cécile Pouettre died on August 24, 1903. The causes of her death are not known but are certainly linked to the fact that she took morphine injections for her pain, and not to rabies. Maurice Rollinat, probably suffering from colorectal cancer, was transported to the clinic of Doctor Moreau in Ivry near Paris, where he died on October 26, 1903, at the age of 56. He is buried in the Saint-Denis cemetery in Châteauroux.

On Rollinat's death, Auguste Rodin offered the Fresselines commune a bas-relief entitled "Poet and the Muse". This sculpture is on display on the wall of the village church at Fresselines.

== Publications ==
- 1877 : Dans les brandes
- 1883 : Les Névroses
- 1886 : L'Abîme
- 1887 : Dix mélodies nouvelles
- 1892 : La Nature
- 1893 : Le Livre de la nature (anthology)
- 1896 : Les Apparitions
- 1898 : Ce que dit la Vie et Ce que dit la Mort
- 1899 : Paysages et paysans
- 1903 : En errant, proses d'un solitaire

=== Posthumes ===
- 1904 : Ruminations : proses d'un solitaire
- 1911 : Les Bêtes
- 1919 : Fin d'Œuvre

=== Contemporary editions ===
- Œuvres (éditées par R. Miannay - 1977) - Lettres Modernes Minard
  1. Dans les brandes (1877)
  2. Les Névroses (1883)
