= Fumism =

Movement in Parisian art (1870s-1910s)

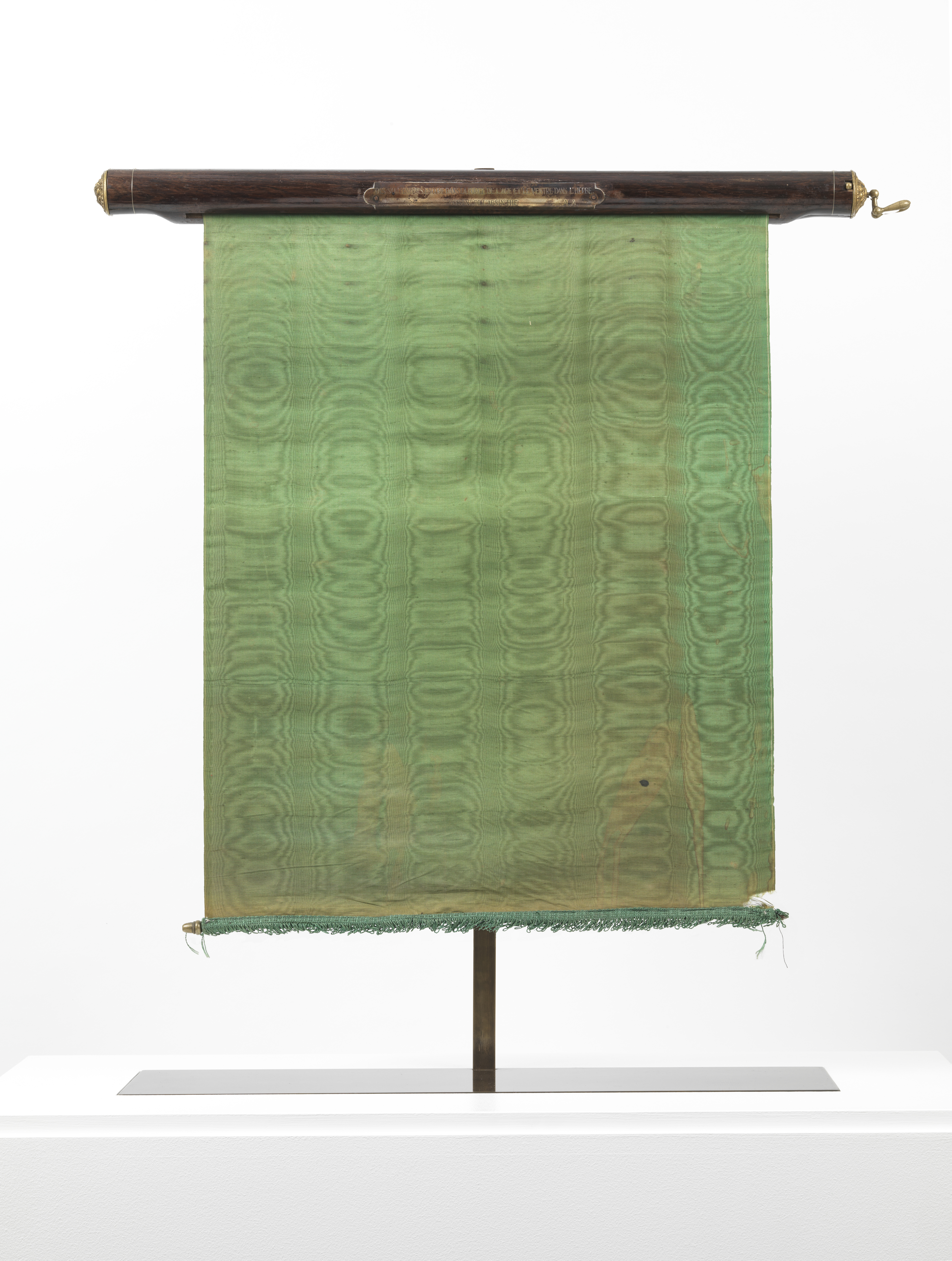
Alphonse Allais, ″Pimps still in their prime, bellies in the grass, drink absinthe″ ('Les Arts incohérents, 1884)

Fumism or fumisme (French: fumisme from the French: fumée, smoke) is a conditionally decadent movement in Parisian art that existed from the late 1870s to the first quarter of the 20th century. Fumism can be characterized as ″the art of blowing smoke in your eyes″ — practically, it is the same as Dadaism, but only forty years earlier. This generalized aesthetic-philosophical term became widespread in French culture in the late 19th and early 20th centuries thanks to Émile Goudeau, a poet, writer, finance ministry official, and founder of the so-called ″Hydropath Society″. The founders and ideological inspirers of the movement were the same Émile Goudeau, as well as two permanent troublemakers: Arthur Sapeck (real name — Eugène Bataille) and Alphonse Allais.

On the other hand, “fumists” (fumists or supporters of “fumism”) were not only artists and actors who were part of a specific aesthetic movement, but also a much broader group: in general, people who were frivolous, pretentious, throwing dust in the eyes and creating works in avant-garde styles (including the Fauvists, by consonance).

== ″The Society of Hydropaths″, the Beginning of Fumism ==
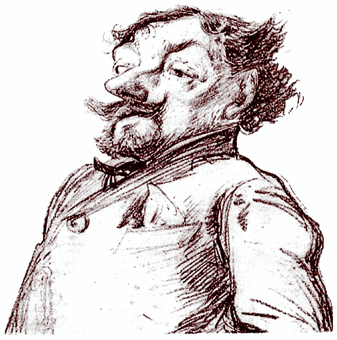
Émile Goudeau, caricature (circa 1885)

In October 1878, the poet and finance ministry official Émile Goudeau organized a “closed” circle (or artistic club) called the “Society of Hydropaths”, where poets, writers, and playwrights gathered to drink heavily and eat a little, and in the meantime, show each other poems, essays, sketches, monologues, and generally anything that could be “showed.” Sharp verbal duels regularly took place between the hydropaths, where they could show off their wit, quick reactions, or wordplay.

Some time later, more precisely in February 1879, on the initiative of the founder of the club (the same Émile Goudeau) and under his editorship, a newspaper of the same name, ″Hydropat″, was founded. Later the name was changed to ″Hydropats″, and then the newspaper received its last name ″All Paris″ — and soon ceased to exist. During the first year (1879-1880), thirty-one issues of the newspaper were published.

At the initial stage, the composer Georges Fragerolle played a major role in the emergence of the fumists in place of the hydropaths. In 1879 he joined the Hydropathic literary club. On 12 May 1880 he published an article on ″Fumisme″. ″Fumisme″ is a system of elaborate hoaxes used to expose hypocrites and deflate the pompous. It was often practiced by the Hydropathes. According to Fragerolle, fumisme

...is to wit what operetta is to opéra-bouffe, caricature to cartoon, prunes to castor oil. To be considered a wit, it is sometimes enough to be an ass in a lion's skin; to be a good fumiste, it is often required to be a lion in an ass's skin. In the former case, the effect is direct, in the latter it is once, twice, often ten times reflected.

The Fumist manifesto, written by Fragerolle, contained the main thesis, which could be considered the motto of this movement: «The arts must become fumism <turn into smoke>, or they will not exist».

Émile Goudeau′s ″Hydropathic Club″ (where they treated themselves with fiery absinthe rather than water) existed for almost three years. The last meeting took place in Montmartre in 1881. At the same time, Rodolphe Salis opened his famous artistic café ″Le Chat Noir″, which partially absorbed and then replaced the former amorphous Hydropaths.

The ideas of the early hydropathists were continued by the historic exhibitions of the Arts Incohérents by Jules Lévy, the first of which took place in October 1882. Many hydropathists and fumists, including Alphonse Allais and Eugène Bataille, showed their fumist discoveries (painting, music and theatre) at these exhibitions, which anticipated Minimalism, Dadaism and Suprematism by decades.

== Name and meaning ==
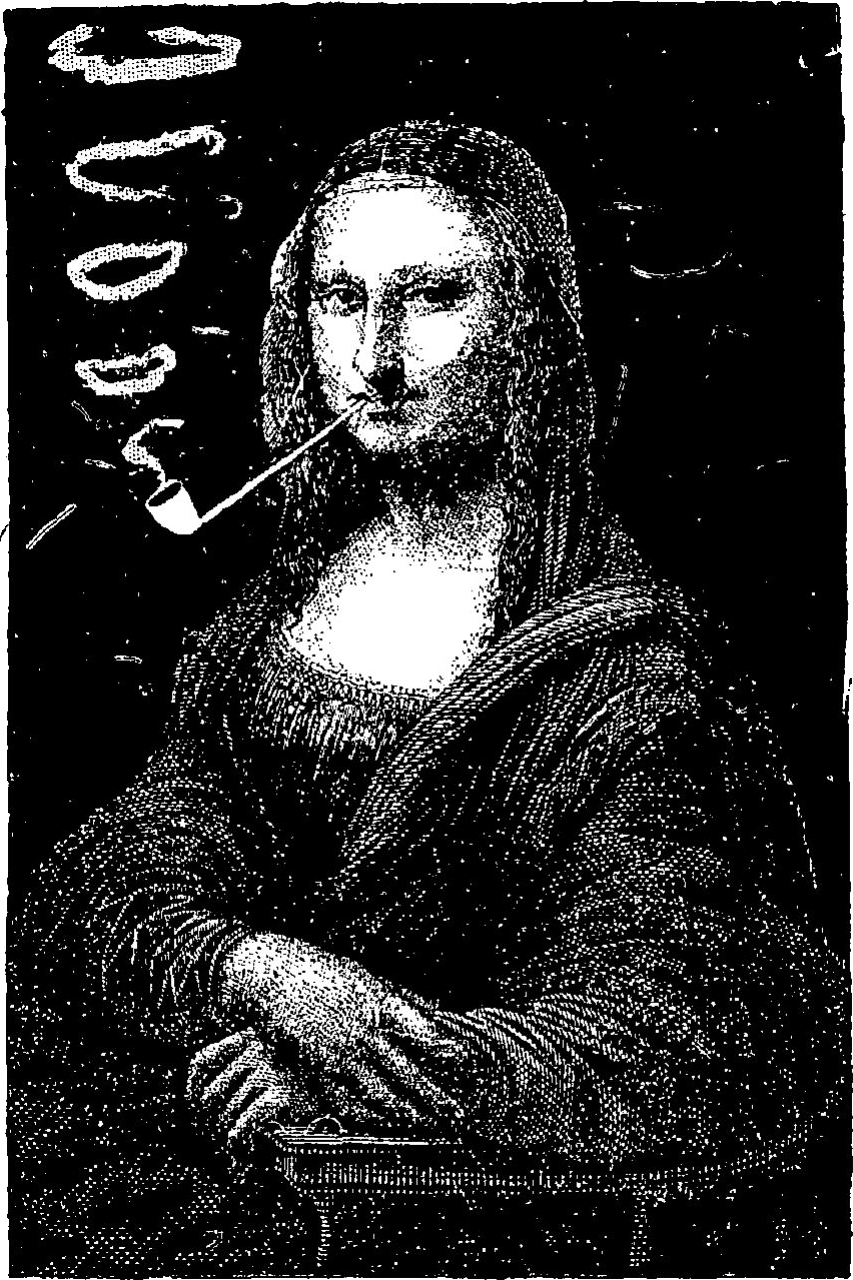
Eugène Bataille, «La Gioconda with a Pipe» (1883)

The playful term ″fumism″, casually dropped by Émile Goudeau and then briskly picked up by Sapek and Alphonse Allais, grew out of the noun French: fumée — smoke. It is a collective philosophical term denoting a person's attitude to the world, to himself, and also to art as a type of human activity. The new attitude was expressed in the deliberate ridicule and mockery of everything and everyone without any restrictions or prohibitions, the shaming of everyday stupidity and bourgeois consciousness. The more incomprehensible and absurd, the stronger the bewilderment, the better and higher the result — such was the invisible motto of the fumists. Thus, having begun its formation with moderate ″hydropathy″ (hydrotherapy), a group of French writers, and later artists and even composers, found their ideological justification and support on the basis of total and all-pervading fumée, or — smoke.

Meanwhile, the play on words prevailed here: in French, the word fumée, its derivatives, and similar-sounding ones have more meanings: from smoke and smoking itself, to stove-setters, chimney sweeps, chatterboxes, liars, empty talkers, and even pure manure.

Since the ″Hydropathic Society″ ceased to exist in the stuffy atmosphere of the club, its art of blowing smoke and dust in the eyes, playing practical jokes and mockery spread throughout Paris and then further afield in the form of fumism. For the fumists, the everyday practice of shocking or ″mocking the stupidity of the common man″ was of great importance. In much the same way, in the 1920s, a group of surrealists smashed exhibitions, started fights at performances and constantly disturbed public order. The fumists were not as noisy, but in general they behaved in much the same way.

Fumism emerged as smoke from the ″Hydropathic Society″ founded by the civil servant and poet Émile Goudeau. By chance (and Emile Goudot himself), Arthur Sapek and Alphonse Allais were named (appointed) as the ideological leaders of Fumism. The greatest oral contribution to the initial development of Fumism was made by Eugène Bataille, a caricaturist, wit, mystifier, and later a government official in the field of mass spectacles and entertainment. Some of his works seem almost direct quotations from the ″Dadaist artists″, in particular, from Marcel Duchamp (for example, ″L.H.O.O.Q.″, 1919), with the only amendment that they appeared almost four decades earlier.

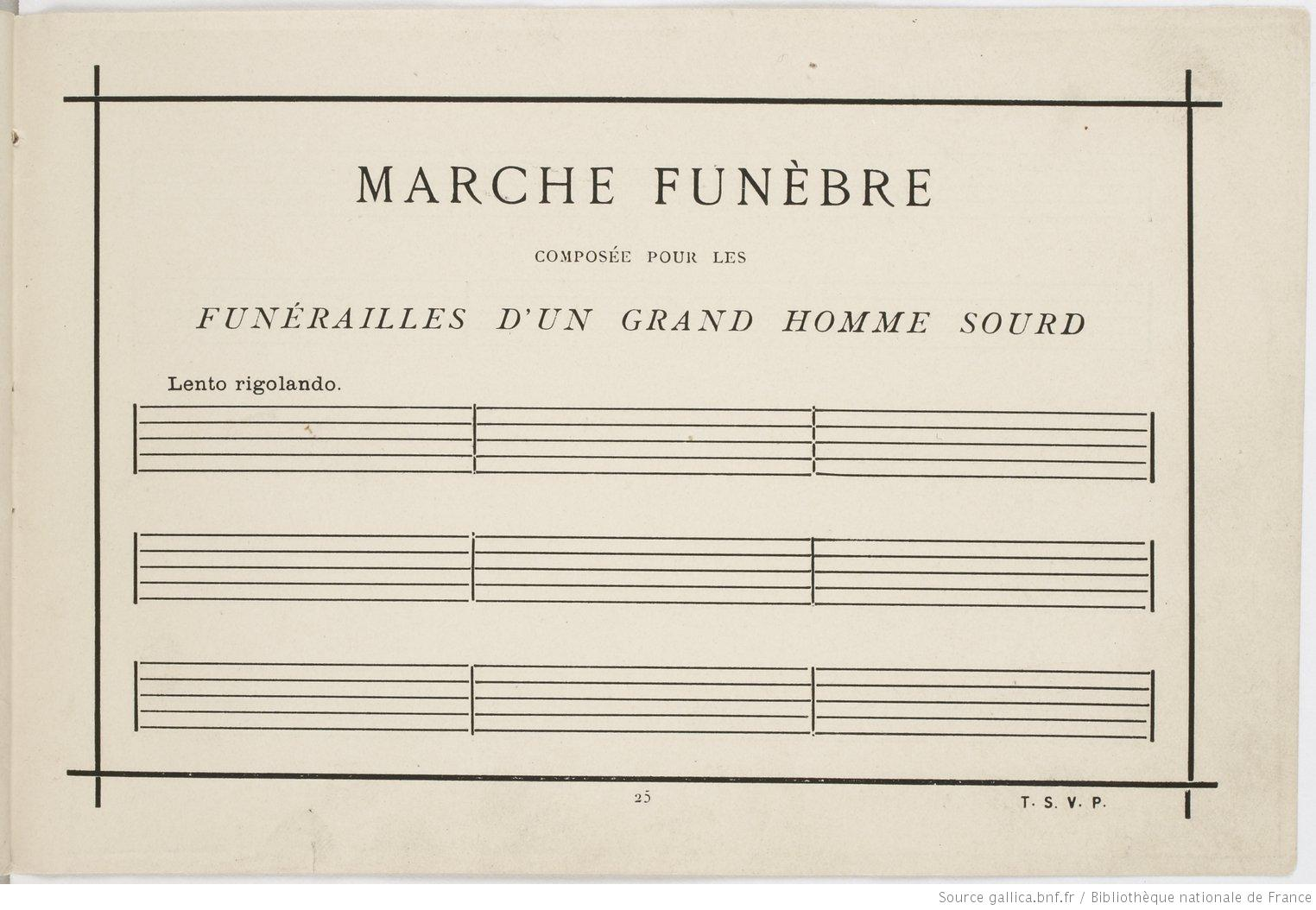
Alphonse Allais. ″Funeral march composed for the funeral of a great deaf man″, 1883

After Sapek′s departure — first for government service and later from life altogether — the principal successor to the traditions of Fumism was the “chief of the Fumists”, Alphonse Allais, an eccentric writer, black humorist, and journalist. Through Allais′s stories and newspaper chronicles, many of the purely oral artifacts of Fumism's early period were preserved, both as historical accounts and as works of a distinctly literary character. These surviving works extended beyond literature to include pictorial, and even musical forms.

Evidence of Allais′s early literary success appeared in the January 1880 issue of the newspaper “Hydropat”, which was devoted entirely to him and featured a caricature — this time, not works by Sapeck — on its cover.

Already in the first year of Fumism, Paul Vivien wrote in his “leading” article:

...Alphonse Allais, head of the Fumist School, is one of the most famous and beloved characters of the Latin Quarter, where he has long been known for his wonderful gaiety and sharp wit...

After the early death of Alphonse Allais, his close friend, the composer Erik Satie, became his informal heir and most prominent successor to Fumism. He, along with the artist and poet George Auriol, inevitably became the link between Fumism and the emerging Dadaism. The young representatives of Dada, Tristan Tzara and Francis Picabia, recognized him as a Dadaist from the very first word and accepted him as one of their own. As for the upcoming surrealism (a movement that many Dadaists joined), even the term itself appeared in 1917 in the manifesto “New Spirit” – as a new genre definition for Eric Satie’s ballet “Parade”.

The only “heir” of fumism in Russia was declared to be the famous “king of eccentricity” and “vomiting chansonnier” Mikhail Savoyarov in the 1910s. As a teenager, having experienced the influence of some Parisian fumists and the Russian obscene poet Pyotr Schumacher in the 1890s, Savoyarov later, as a tribute of respect and gratitude, called his “unbridled” concerts “smoky fonforisms” or “fanfaronnades”. In one of his poems, Savoyarov directly calls himself a smoke generator and at the same time a stove maker (“I am a fumist − and I am proud of it, my name is Savoyarov”), which is completely in line with the traditions of the movement he represented.

In the 21st century, Savoyarov′s grandson, the Russian composer and writer Yuri Khanon, continues to call himself a fumist, thus continuing the fumist game and emphasizing the unbreakable connection between generations in culture. He traces his artistic «genealogy» to Erik Satie and Alphonse Allais. In his book, «The History of a Town (complete)», he also asserts that the Russian writer Mikhail Saltykov-Shchedrin, in his most famous book, was «an obvious fumist», although he never called himself one. An anarchist and fumist in spirit, he never identified with any group, manifesto, or political or aesthetic party.

== See also ==
- Fauvism
- Impressionism
- Incoherents
- French art
- Dadaism
- Surrealism

== Sources ==
- Harding, James Martin (2000). Contours of the Theatrical Avant-Garde: Performance and Textuality. University of Michigan Press. ISBN 978-0-472-06727-5.
