= Alphonse Allais =

French writer and humorist (1854–1905)

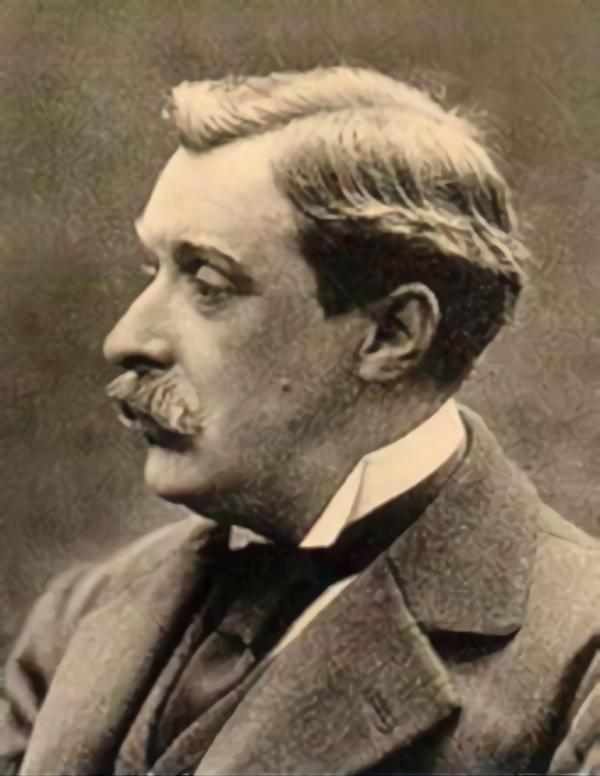
- Born: Alphonse Allais; Honfleur, Calvados, France
- Died: October 28, 1905 (aged 51); Paris, France
- Occupations: Writer, journalist
- Writing career
- Pen name: Francisque Sarcey
- Language: French
- Movements: Fumism (also in painting and music)

Alphonse Allais (20 October 1854 – 28 October 1905) was a French writer, journalist and humorist. He was also the editor of the Chat Noir, a satirical magazine.

== Life ==
From 1879, Alphonse Allais attended the ″Hydropathic Society″ of Émile Goudeau, from which the school of fumism grew. Evidence (and the crowning glory) of Alphonse Allais's first literary successes was the January 1880 issue of the newspaper ″Hydropat″ entirely dedicated to him, with a caricature on the entire cover. It depicted a blond pharmacist, Alphonse Allais.

Already in the first year of Fumism, Paul Vivien wrote in his "leading" article:

...Alphonse Allais, head of the Fumist School, is one of the most famous and beloved characters of the Latin Quarter, where he has long been known for his wonderful gaiety and sharp wit...

== Work ==
Alphonse Allais

He is the author of many collections of whimsical writings. A poet as much as a humorist, he cultivated the verse form known as holorhyme (all verses are homophonous, where entire lines are pronounced the same). For example:

Par les bois du djinn où s'entasse de l'effroi,
Parle et bois du gin, ou cent tasses de lait froid. (Note: Translation: 'By the woods of the Djinn where dread heaps up, / Talk about and drink gin, or a hundred cups of cold milk.')

Allais wrote the earliest known example of a completely silent musical composition. His Funeral March for the Obsequies of a Great Deaf Man of 1897 consists of 24 blank measures. It predates similarly silent but intellectually serious works by John Cage and Erwin Schulhoff by many years. His prose piece "Story for Sara" was translated and illustrated by Edward Gorey.

Allais participated in humorous exhibitions, including those of the Salon des Arts Incohérents of 1883 and 1884, held at the Galerie Vivienne. At these, inspired by his friend Paul Bilhaud's 1882 exhibit of an entirely black painting entitled "Negroes fight in a tunnel" (which he later reproduced with a slightly different title), Allais exhibited arguably some of the earliest examples of monochrome painting: for instance his plain white sheet of Bristol paper Première communion de jeunes filles chlorotiques par un temps de neige (First Communion of Anemic Young Girls In The Snow) (1883), and a similar red work Apoplectic Cardinals Harvesting Tomatoes on the Shore of the Red Sea (Aurora Borealis Effect) (1884). Allais published his Album primo-avrilesque in 1897, a monograph with seven monochrome artworks, accompanied by the score of his silent funeral march. (Bilhaud was not the first to create an all-black artwork: for example, Robert Fludd published an image of "Darkness" in his 1617 book on the origin and structure of the cosmos; and Bertall published his black Vue de La Hogue (effet de nuit) in 1843.) However, Allais's activity bears more similarity to 20th century Dada, or Neo-Dada, and particularly the works of the Fluxus group of the 1960s, than to 20th century monochrome painting since Malevich.

While consuming absinthe at café tables, Allais wrote 1600 newspaper and magazine pieces, and co-founded the Club of the Hydropaths (those allergic to water). He was a journalist, columnist and editor as well.

A film based on his novel L'Affaire Blaireau appeared in 1958 as Neither Seen Nor Recognized . Earlier versions with the same title as the original novel appeared in 1923 and 1932.

Miles Kington, humorous writer and musician, translated some of Allais' pieces into idiomatic English as The World of Alphonse Allais (UK). In the United States, Doug Skinner has translated sixteen books by Allais, including Captain Cap and his only novel.

Honfleur has a street, rue Alphonse Allais, and a school, Collège Alphonse Allais, named for him. There is a Place Alphonse-Allais in the 20th arrondissement of Paris. The Académie Alphonse-Allais has awarded an annual prize, the Prix Alphonse-Allais, in his honor since 1954.

== Discovery ==
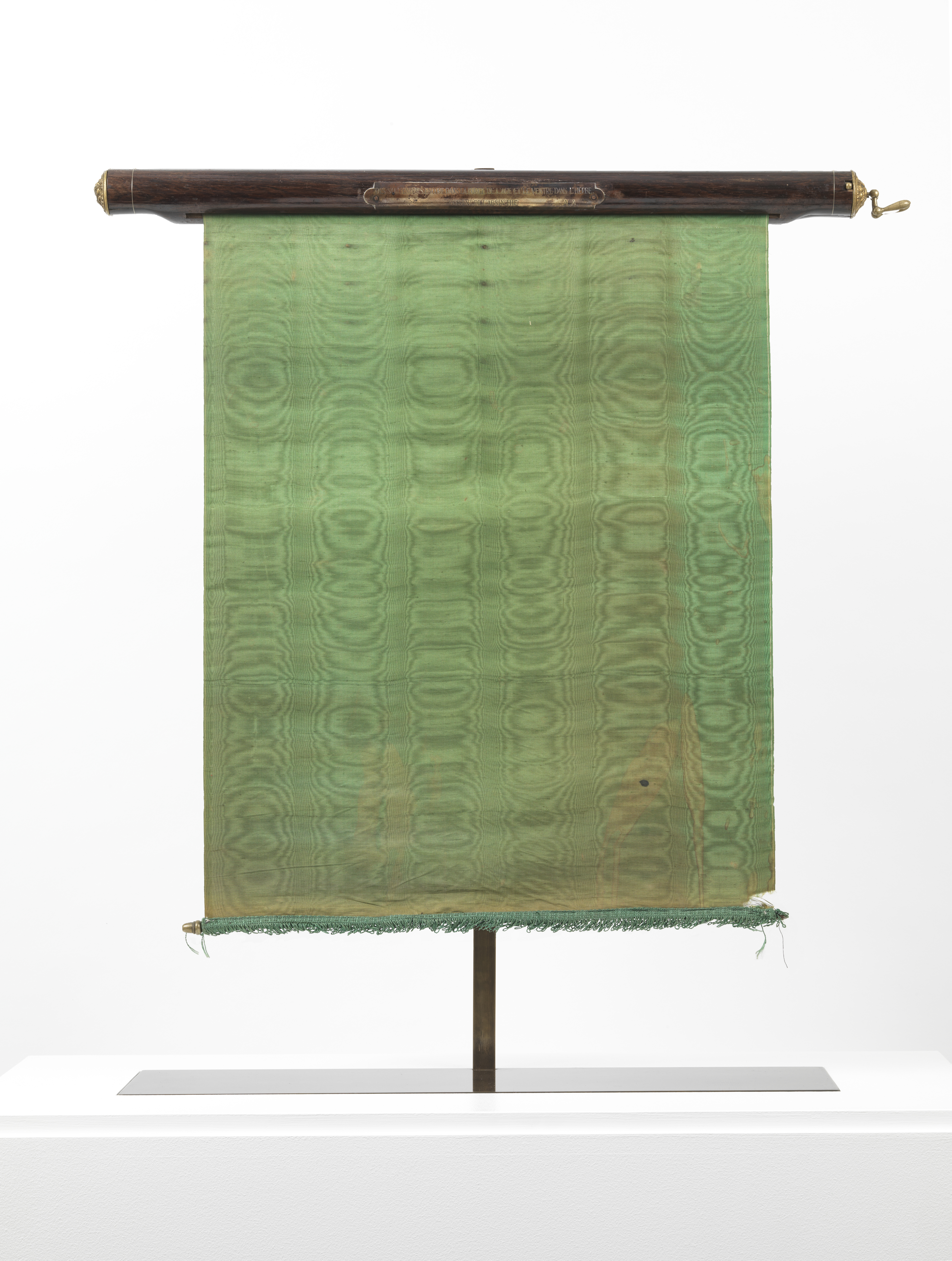
Alphonse Allais, Des souteneurs encore dans la force de l'âge et le ventre dans l'herbe boivent de l'absinthe. Carriage curtain, before 1897.

In 2018, the French expert Johann Naldi, a specialist in nineteenth-century art, discovered among a previously unpublished set of seventeen works of Incoherents "Des souteneurs encore dans la force de l'âge et le ventre dans l'herbe boivent de l'absinthe", consisting of a green carriage curtain embellished with a cartel with a title. Executed before 1897, when Allais was compiling his monochroidal experiments in his Album primo-avrilesque, this work is the only monochrome by Alphonse Allais identified to date, classified as a National Treasure on May 7, 2021, by decision of the Ministry of Culture.

In February 2024, the work made its world premiere in the exhibition "Henri de Toulouse-Lautrec, Parigi 1881-1901" at the Palazzo Roverella, in Rovigo, Italy.

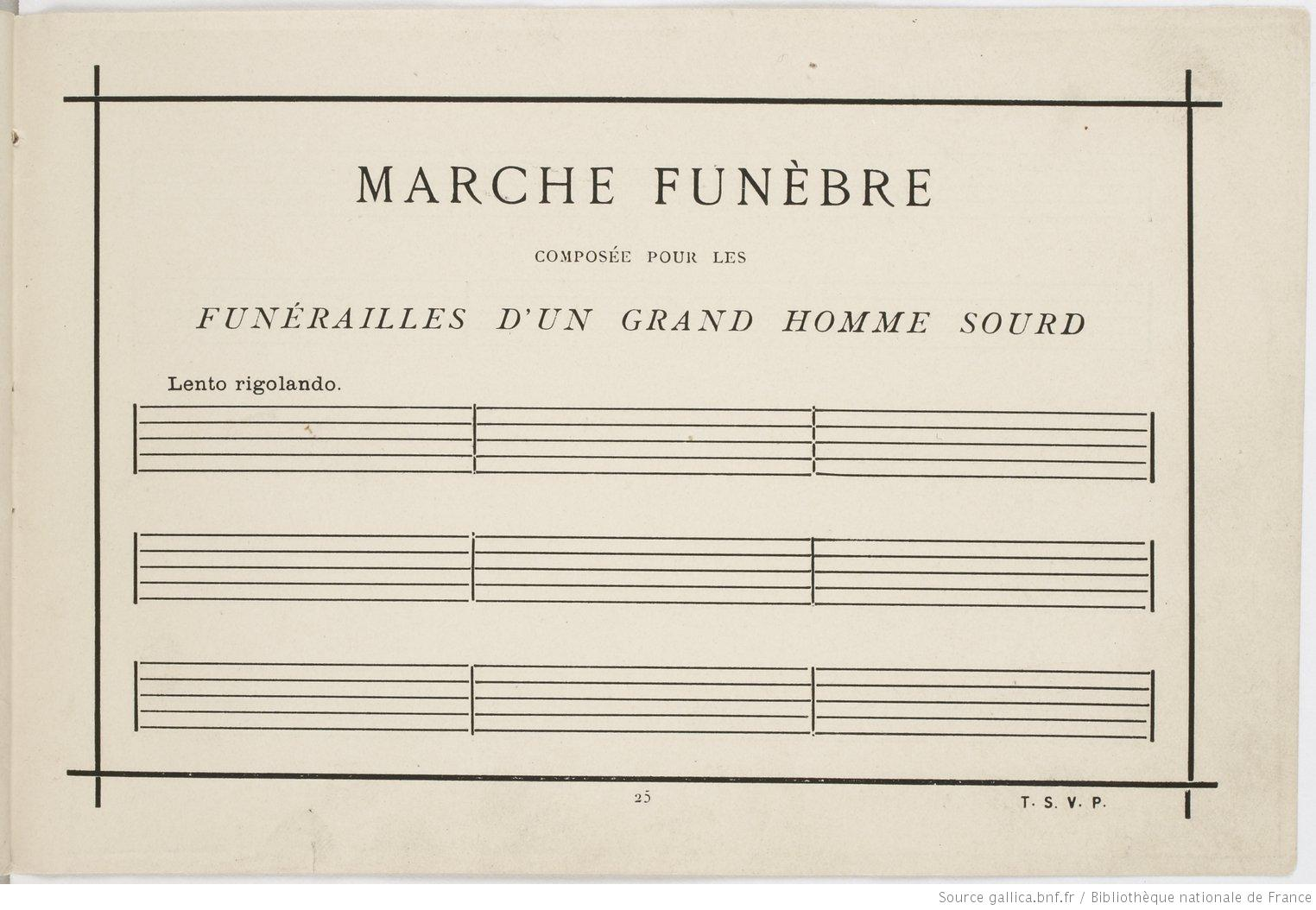
Marche funèbre composée pour les funérailles d'un grand homme sourd (Funeral March for the Obsequies of a Deaf Man)

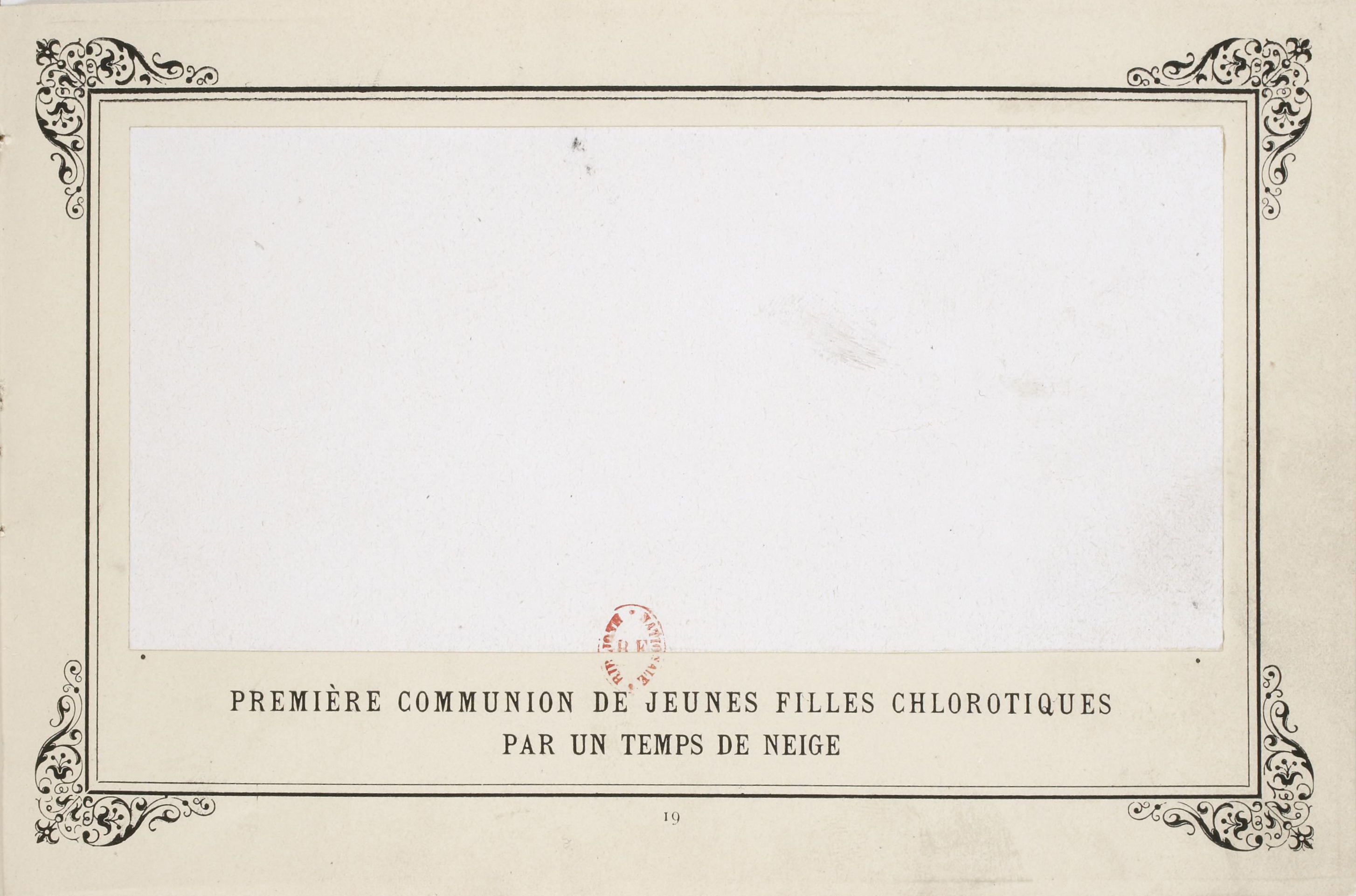
First Communion of Anaemic Young Girls In The Snow (1883)

== Museum ==
The Alphonse Allais Museum, also called Le Petit Musée, in Honfleur, claiming to be the smallest museum in France (8 m^{2}), consists of a small collection of "rarities", including the skull of Voltaire at age seventeen and a true piece of a False Cross (cf. True Cross), as well as inventions such as a special Chinese teacup made for left-handed people (cf. chawan), blue, white, and red starch to keep flags flying when there is no wind, black confetti for widows, and so on. The museum was founded on the second floor in Allais' parents' pharmacy in 1999 by the owner of the pharmacy, and moved to a new location in 2019 (rue des Petites boucheries).

== Organizations ==
Two non-profit organizations celebrate Allais:

- The Association des Amis d'Alphonse Allais (AAAA), founded in 1934, manages the Allais Museum and promotes young humorists who follow in the spirit of Allais.
- The Académie Alphonse Allais, created in 1954, Allais' 100th birthday, by Henri Jeanson, like the Académie française, names new members annually and sponsors the "Alphonse Allais" literary prize.

== Principal works ==
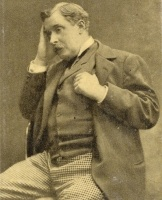
Alphonse Allais, (~ 1899)

- À se tordre, 1891
- Vive la vie !, 1892
- Deux et deux font cinq, 1895
- Amours, délices et orgues, 1898
- L'Affaire Blaireau (The Blaireau Case), 1899
- Ne nous frappons pas (literally Let's not hit each other), 1900

== English translations ==
Published in the US

- Feeding Time. Translated by Doug Skinner (Black Scat Books, ISBN 979-8-9923826-4-8, 2025)
- My Rent Is Due!. Translated by Doug Skinner (Black Scat Books, ISBN 979-8-9908521-4-3, 2024)
- We Are Not Sheep. Translated by Doug Skinner (Black Scat Books, ISBN 979-8-9881850-2-4, 2023)
- Let's Not Hit Each Other. Translated by Doug Skinner (Black Scat Books, ISBN 979-8986922423, 2023)
- Loves, Delights, & Organs. Translated by Doug Skinner (Black Scat Books, ISBN 978-1737943099, 2022)
- 2 + 2 = 5. Translated by Doug Skinner (Black Scat Books, ISBN 978-1735764672, 2021)
- Pink and Apple-Green. Translated by Doug Skinner (Black Scat Books, ISBN 978-1734816617, 2020)
- The Alphonse Allais Reader. Compiled and translated by Doug Skinner (Black Scat Books, ISBN 978-1732350670, 2018)
- No Bile!. Translated by Doug Skinner (Black Scat Books, ISBN 978-0999262290, 2018)
- Masks. Translated & illustrated by Norman Conquest (Absurdist Texts & Documents #1), ISBN 978-1987530230, 2018)
- Long Live Life!. Translated by Doug Skinner (Black Scat Books, ISBN 978-0999262245, 2017)
- I Am Sarcey. Translated by Doug Skinner (Black Scat Books, ISBN 9780997777161, 2017)
- Double Over. Translated by Doug Skinner (Black Scat Books, ISBN 978-0997777130, 2016)
- The Blaireau Affair. Translated by Doug Skinner (Black Scat Books, ISBN 978-0692519523, 2015)
- The Squadron's Umbrella. Translated by Doug Skinner (Black Scat Books, ISBN 978-0692392126, 2015)
- Selected Plays of Alphonse Allais. Translated by Doug Skinner (Black Scat Books, ISBN 978-0692275085, 2014)
- Captain Cap: His Adventures, His Ideas, His Drinks. Translated by Doug Skinner (Black Scat Books, ISBN 9780615843407, 2013)
- Captain Cap: Vol. I. Translated by Doug Skinner (Black Scat Books: Absurdist Texts & Documents Series No. 11, 2013)
- Captain Cap: Vol. II: The Apparent Symbiosis Between the Boa and Giraffe. Translated by Doug Skinner (Black Scat Books: Absurdist Texts & Documents Series No. 14, 2013)
- Captain Cap: Vol. III: The Antifilter & Other Inventions. Translated by Doug Skinner (Black Scat Books: Absurdist Texts & Documents Series No. 17, 2013)
- Captain Cap: Vol. IV: The Sanatorium of the Future. Translated by Doug Skinner (Black Scat Books: Absurdist Texts & Documents Series No. 20, 2013)
- How I Became an Idiot by Francisque Sarcey (Alphonse Allais). Translated by Doug Skinner (Black Scat Books: Absurdist Texts & Documents - Interim Edition No. 00, 2013)
- The Adventures of Captain Cap. Translated by Brian Stableford (Black Coat Press, ISBN 9781612272184, 2013)
