= Incoherents =

19th-century French art movement

The Incoherents (Les Arts incohérents) was a short-lived French art movement founded by Parisian writer and publisher Jules Lévy (1857–1935) in 1882. In the movement's satirical irreverence, it anticipated many of the art techniques and attitudes later associated with the avant-garde and anti-art movements such as Dada.

Lévy coined the phrase les arts incohérents as a play on the term les arts décoratifs (i.e. arts and crafts, but above all, a famous art school in Paris, the National School of Decorative Arts). The Incoherents presented work which was deliberately irrational and iconoclastic, used found objects, was nonsensical, included humoristic sketches, drawings by children, and drawings "made by people who don't know how to draw". Lévy exhibited an all-black painting by poet Paul Bilhaud called Combat de Nègres dans un Tunnel (Negroes Fight in a Tunnel). The early film animator Émile Cohl contributed photographs which would later be called surreal.

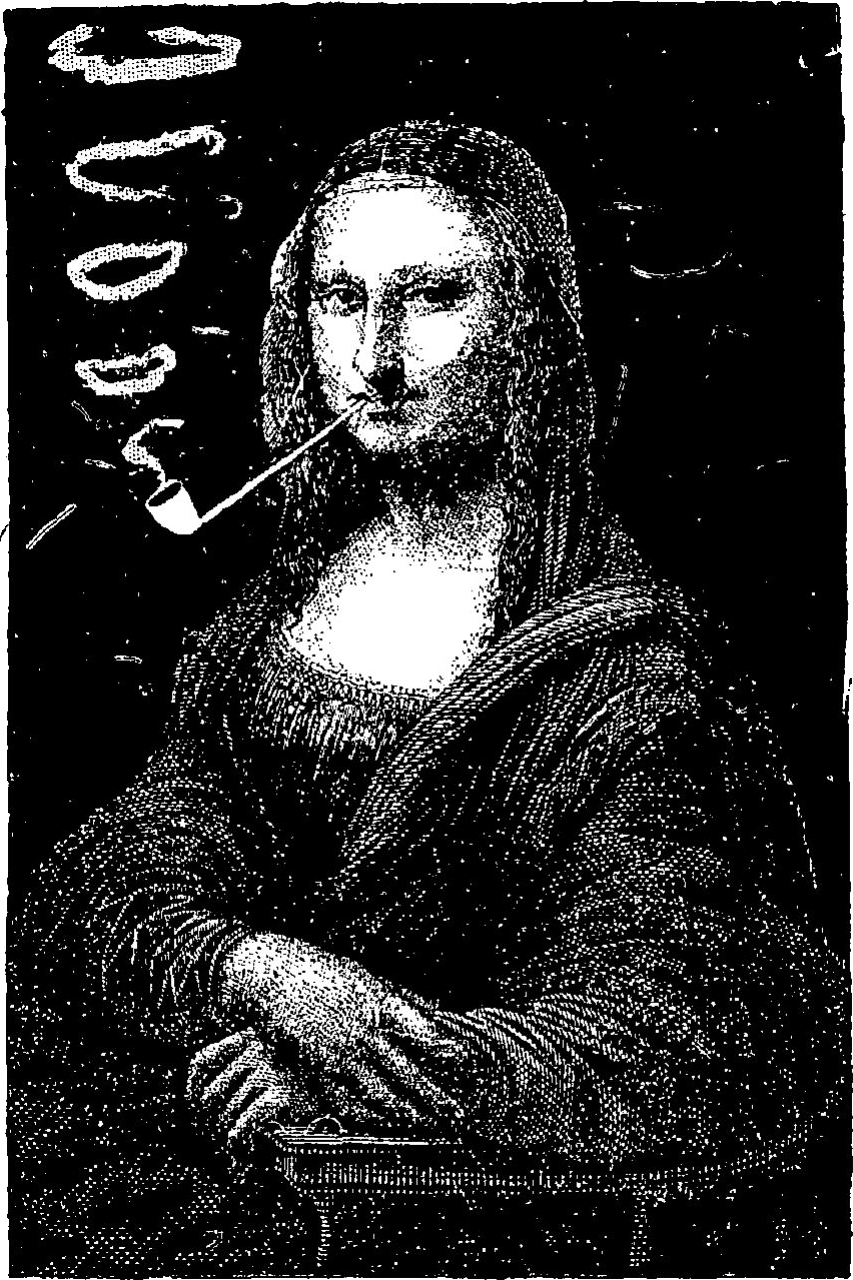
The Mona Lisa Smoking a Pipe by Eugène Bataille (Sapeck), as published in Coquelin Cadet's Le Rire (1887)

Although a small and short-lived movement, the Incoherents were well known. The group sprang from the same Montmartre cabaret culture that spawned the Hydropathes of Émile Goudeau, Hirzuts and Fumists of Alphonse Allais, and Alfred Jarry's Ubu Roi. The October 1882 show was attended by two thousand people, including Manet, Renoir, Camille Pissarro, and Richard Wagner. Beginning in 1883 there were annual shows, or masked balls, or both. In an 1883 show, the artist Eugène Bataille contributed Le rire, an "augmented" Mona Lisa smoking a pipe, that directly prefigures the famous 1919 "appropriation" of the Mona Lisa L.H.O.O.Q., by Marcel Duchamp, who was born 4 years later.

The movement wound down in the mid-1890s. It is said to have influenced filmmaker George Melies, whose surreal plots and surprise special effects reflected the nonsensical amusements of the Incoherent movement.

== History ==
The Incoherents were born in the late nineteenth century, a period that was rich in scientific discoveries and social innovations. Cheeky and inventive, this time also marks a turning point in the field of art. The official art traditions were even being questioned in the newspapers through satirical images which implied it was a dying craft. It was in this creative lull that Jules Levy - former member of the literary club Hydropathes - decided to organize "an exhibition of drawings made by people who can not draw." This charitable carnival helped victims of a recent gas explosion to have an opportunity to present their works. The first "Incoherent arts" get-together, which took place on July 13, 1882 on the Champs Elysées hosts many curiosities. Taking advantage of a power outage, and lit only by candlelight, they created a jumble of rebellious works, using all types of materials and any inspiration with the ultimate goal of making people laugh.

On October 2, 1882, Jules Lévy decided to repeat the experience at home. He gathered his friends under the pretense of having an "unusual evening". In his tiny apartment they worked under the phrase "Death to clichés, to us young people!" They received unexpected success and much newspaper coverage. As a result, the Incohérents arts movement became ingrained into the Parisian cultural landscape. In October 1883, the first official exhibition of Incoherent art, was held at the Parisian Galerie Vivienne. The purpose was charitable as with all Incoherent exhibits thereafter. A regulation 13-point proclamation was that "All the works are allowed, serious works and obscene excepted." The exhibition's catalog included a piece by Levy Orville in which he reverses an inkwell for the sake of aesthetics. The tone of the exhibition was set by an abundance of parodies and pictorial puns. More than 20,000 visitors saw the show over a month.

A year later, the Incoherents returned to haunt the Galerie Vivienne with their cheeky pranks. They hoped this occasion would see the image of the "Chief pipes Poyle sand without number, on a silver field," an ancient statue carving chisel of an academician who does not lead wide. A catalog accompanied the exhibition with luxury engraved reproductions of most of the significant works. On its cover, a dancer brandishes a broom and scares away the gloom of black birds. The journalists accompanied the event with enthusiasm. The artists were increasingly familiarizing themselves with the pictorial map and the pun, both of which helped to establish this kind of "Incoherent" art.

In 1886 the Incoherents at the Eden Theatre unveiled their new exhibit. Jules Chéret's poster included Levy going through the moon like a paper hoop. At the entrance, the rules regarding the event were framed prominently: "One goal you propose, laugh and cheer you frankly." The room was also full of visitors that worked in high, medium or low relief. Everything was recorded in catalog records which are decorated with "striking" portraits of exhibitors and zany references.

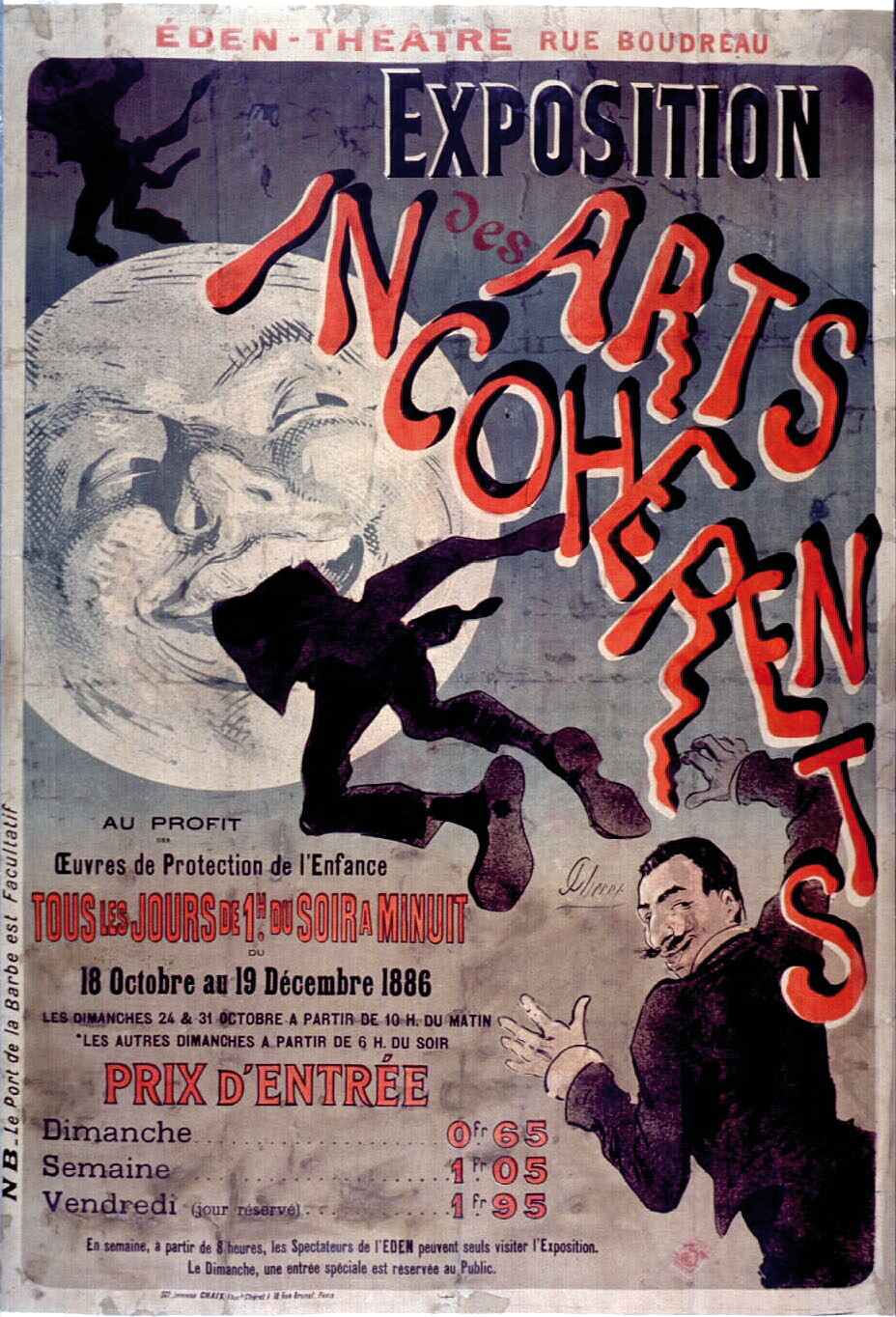
1886

In 1886 Jules Levy began to be the target of criticism. He was accused of using the Incoherent Arts for its own interests. He had in fact opened a publishing house in 1886 and published the works of his friends (Goudeau, Leroy, Monselet, etc..), illustrated by artists such as Boutet, Somm or Gray. He lost the support of the satirical weekly magazine Le Courrier français who had declared him "the official unofficial Incoherent" in 1884. Meanwhile, others began taking advantage of the Incoherent movement by opening Incoherent cafés or magazines, that the founders of the movement had nothing to do with.

In 1887 Jules Levy promised the end of Inconsistency would be on April 16 of that year. A costume party was organized for the occasion with a Folies Bergère funeral procession. However, Incoherence has a brief renaissance on March 27, 1889 at a new dance held at the Eden Theatre. Levy wanted this event to remind the good memories of the Incoherent arts and to announce the return of his exhibitions. But in the spring of the 1889 exhibition he organized, while the Expo was in full swing in Paris, it was a fiasco. The press hardly covered the event, and even the Le Courrier français remained silent. The Incoherent arts had lost its novelty value.

Jules Levy, refusing to give up, created the magazine Folies Bergère in January 1891. Poorly organized, not repeated, the show is considered too long and the ball too short. The last gasp of the inconsistency, his exhibition of 1893 had a brand new premise at Olympia, and passed almost unnoticed. Jules Blois of the French Mail wrote: "All that is outdated, outmoded. Inconsistency joined decadence, decay and other jokes with or without handles in the bag of old-fashioned rags." Despite that, Levy still pulled on the Incoherent string until 1896 when it was met with massive indifference from the press.

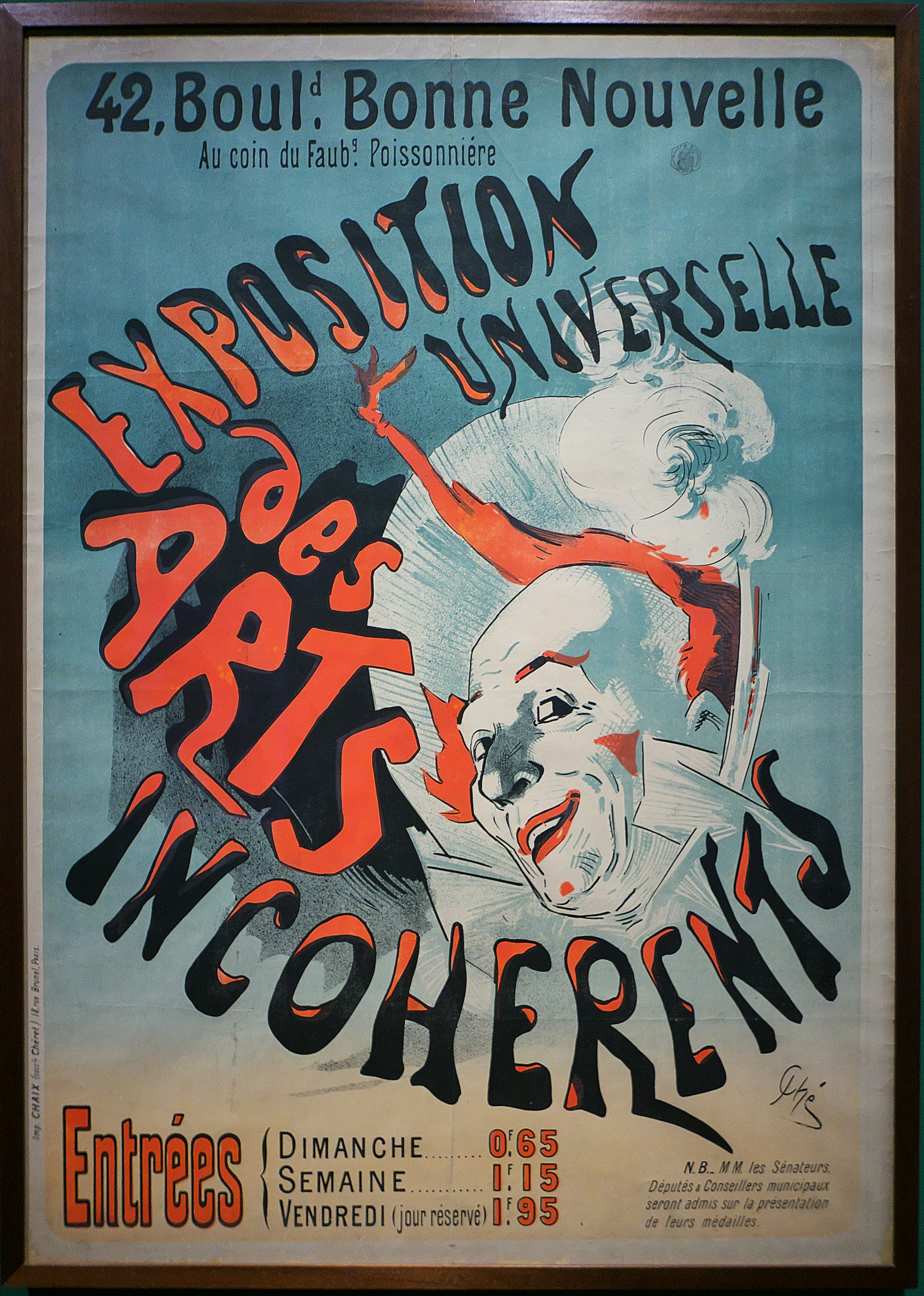
1889

== See also ==
- Fumism
- Anti-art
- Alphonse Allais
- Found object
