= Ernest Grenet-Dancourt =

French poet and playwright

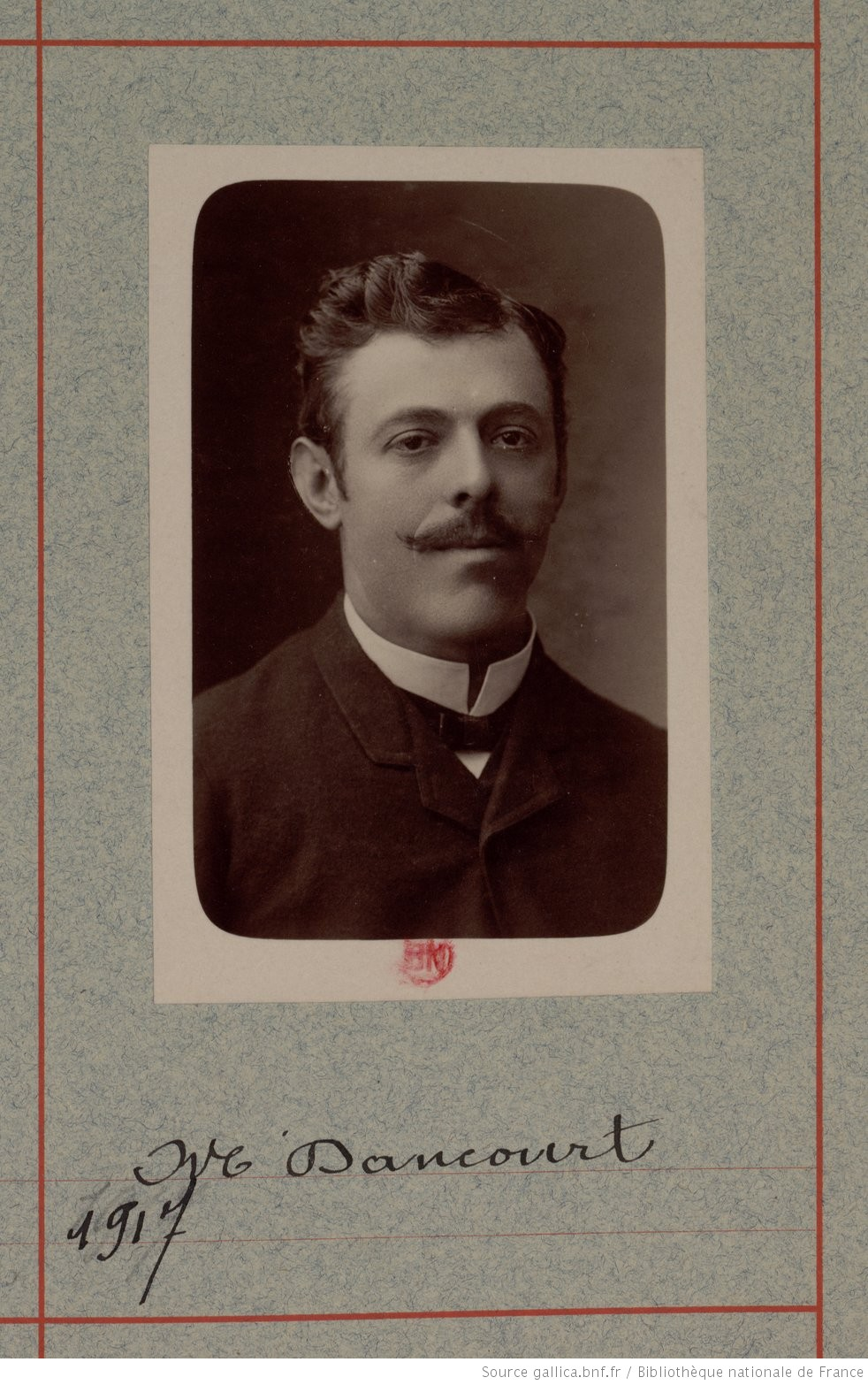
Ernest Grenet-Dancourt

Ernest Louis Antoine Grenet called Ernest Grenet-Dancourt ( 21 February 1854 – 10 February 1913) was a French playwright, poet and songwriter.

== Life ==
Born in the 10th arrondissement of Paris, after studying at the Lycée Saint-Louis, Grenet became a maître d'études, then a bank clerk, before embarking on a career as an actor at the Théâtre de l'Odéon, which he abandoned for good in 1881 to devote himself exclusively to writing.

His plays were performed on the greatest Parisian stages of the 19th century: Théâtre de Cluny, Théâtre des Nouveautés, Théâtre de l'Ambigu-Comique, Théâtre de l'Odéon, etc.

Vice-president of the Les Hydropathes of 1879 and 1884, he was also responsible for some songs: Fleur d'amour, music by Justin Clérice (1910), La Kraquette, song written with Georges Nanteuil (music by Justin Clérice), Tristesse de la mer, music by Alfredo Barbirolli (1912)...

Grenet died in the 9th arrondissement of Paris aged 66.

== Awards ==
- Chevalier de la Légion d'honneur (décret du ministre de l'Instruction publique et des Beaux-Arts du 14 décembre 1900). Parrain : Victorien Sardou.
- Officier de l'Instruction publique.

== Work ==
Monologues :

- La Nuit terrible, badinage en vers, 1879
- Adam et Eve, bouffonnerie en vers, 1879
- Les Voyages, monologue comique, 1882
- Les Joies matrimoniales, monologue comique en vers, 1890
- Les Enfants de l'ivrogne, poème dramatique, 1880
- Une distraction, monologue en vers, 1880
- Paris, monologue comique dit by Coquelin aîné, 1882
- La chasse, monologue comique dit by Coquelin aîné, 1882
- Monologues comiques et dramatiques, P. Ollendorff, 1883
- L'Homme qui bâille, monologue comique, 1884
- Le Bon Dieu, monologue comique, 1884
- J'ai rêvé !, monologue comique, 1887
- L'Ancien temps, monologue comique, 1887
- Thermidor !, raconté par X..., sociétaire de la Comédie-française, 1891
- Le Matador, monologue comique, 1888
- La Vie, monologue comique, 1891
- Le Ventomane, monologue comique, soupiré par X..., sociétaire de la Comédie-française, 1893
- A Guillaume II, P. Ollendorff, 1895
- Le Récit de Théramène, monologue comique, 1895
- La Jeune Fille, monologue comique, dit by Maurice de Féraudy, 1896
- Graine de bourgeoise !, monologue comique en vers, 1906
- Pauvre bête !, monologue comique dit by Émile Duard, 1906
- Socialiste, monologue comique en vers dit by Paul Clerget, 1906
- Choses à dire, comiques et dramatiques, Paul Ollendorff, 1910

Theatre :

- 1881 : Rival pour rire, one-act comedy
- 1882 : Divorçons-nous ?, one-act comedy
- 1882 : La Femme, saynète en 1 acte
- 1882 : Les Noces de mademoiselle Loriquet, comedy in 3 acts
- 1884 : Trois femmes pour un mari, comédie-bouffe in 3 acts
- 1884 : Oscar Bourdoche, one-act comedy
- 1886 : La banque de l'univers, comedy in five acts
- 1887 : Rigobert, vaudeville in 3 acts, with Paul Burani
- 1887 : La véritable histoire de Pierrot
- 1888 : Les Mariés de Mongiron, comédie-bouffe in 3 acts
- 1888 : Hypnotisée !, one-act comedy
- 1890 : La Revanche du mari, comedy in 3 acts, with Félix Cohen
- 1890 : La Scène à faire, comédie conjugale in 1 act
- 1891 : Norah la dompteuse, vaudeville in 3 acts, with Georges Bertal
- 1891 : L'Abbé Vincent, one-act comedy
- 1892 : L'Heure du bain, one-act comedy
- 1893 : Le Torchon brûle !, comédie conjugale in 1 act
- 1893 : Le Voyage des Berluron, vaudeville in 4 acts, with Maurice Ordonneau and Henri Kéroul (play revived in 1903)
- 1894 : Le Moulin de Javelle, opéra-comique in 1 act, music by Paul Henrion
- 1895 : Les gaîtés de l'année, revue de l'année 1894 in 2 acts and three scenes, with Octave Pradels
- 1895 : Jour de divorce, one-act comedy, with Gaston Pollonnais
- 1895 : La Petite veuve !, one-act comedy
- 1895 : Le Phoque, one-act comedy
- 1895 : La Macaroni, vaudeville in 2 acts, interspersed with songs, with Octave Pradels
- 1895 : Trop aimé, comédie-bouffe en 3 actes
- 1896 : Paris quand même ! ou les Deux Bigorret, comédie-bouffe in 3 acts, with Maurice Ordonneau
- 1896 : La Sauterelle, one-act comedy
- 1898 : Celle qu'il faut aimer, one-act comedy, with Gaston Pollonnais
- 1898 : Ceux qui restent !, one-act comedy
- 1900 : Ceux qu'on trompe !, one-act comedy
- 1901 : Le fils surnaturel, comédie-bouffe en 3 actes
- 1902 : Le Vampire, one-act comedy
- 1904 : L'Assassinée, comedy in 4 acts, after a short story by Gaston Bergeret
- 1904 : Beauté fatale ou fatale beauté, poème mobile
- 1904 : Les Gaîtés du veuvage, comédie-bouffe in 3 acts
- 1905 : L'Agrafe, one-act comedy, with Jean Destrem
- 1906 : La Veuve de Taupin, bouffonnerie in 1 act, in verses
- 1908 : Les Tribulations d'un gendre
- 1908 : Le Mendiant d'amour, opereta in 3 acts and 4 scenes, with Louis Marsolleau, music by Henri José
- 1910 : Chou blanc !, play in 3 acts, with Robert Dieudonné
- 1911 : L'Heure du bain, saynète en 1 acte
- 1911 : Par-ci, par-là, revue passe-partout, with Octave Pradels
- 1913 : Le Trésor dans la nuit, one-act comedy, with José Germain, created at the Theatre of Sens, 9 November 1913. This is the last play written by Ernest Grenet-Dancourt.
- Non représenté : Fin de flirt, one-act comedy, published in March 1913 at Albert Méricant éditeur à Paris.

== Film adaptations ==
- 1913: Trois femmes pour un mari by Charles Prince, based on the comedy-bouffe in 3 acts by Ernest Grenet-Dancourt (1884), adapted by Georges Monca.
- 1919: Il viaggio di Berluron, Italian film by Camillo De Riso after Le Voyage de Berluron, vaudeville in four acts by Ernest Grenet-Dancourt, Maurice Ordonneau and Henri Kéroul (1893).
