= Georges Fragerolle =

French musician and composer

- Born: Auguste-Georges-Prosper Fragerolle; 11 March 1855; Paris, France
- Died: 19 February 1920 (aged 64); Asnières, France
- Occupation: Composer

Auguste-Georges-Prosper Fragerolle (11 March 1855 – 19 February 1920) was a French musician and composer.

== Life ==
Georges Fragerolle was born on 11 March 1855 in Paris, the son of wealthy merchants. He studied literature at the Collège Rollin, and obtained a degree in law. Against the advice of his parents, he tried to devote himself to opera, but failed to obtain admission to the Conservatoire de Paris.

Fragerolle joined the Hydropathes literary club. On 12 May 1880 he published an article on "Fumisme". "Fumisme" is a system of elaborate hoaxes used to expose hypocrites and deflate the pompous. It was often practiced by the Hydropathes. According to Fragerolle, fumisme

is to wit what operetta is to opéra-bouffe, caricature to cartoon, prunes to castor oil. To be considered a wit, it is sometimes enough to be an ass in a lion's skin; to be a good fumiste, it is often required to be a lion in an ass's skin. In the former case, the effect is direct, in the latter it is once, twice, often ten times reflected.

Fragerolle learned composition from Ernest Guiraud. He composed arrangements of work by contemporary poets such as Jean Richepin, and sang them to his own accompaniment. Fragerolle became the regular pianist at Le Chat Noir with Erik Satie. He composed most of the music and poetry of the shadow theater pieces, which he interpreted with a baritone voice. He was the maestro of Le Chat Noir and Hydropathes.

On 6 January 1890 Fragerolle produced a Nativity play, La Marche à l'Étoile, with an impressive set of paintings by Henri Rivière.

The reception given to this novel concept was cautious at first, but it ended up by being a success. The play was accompanied by two organs, an oboe, a cello and percussion. Fragerolle sang part of the narrative. Fragerolle set to music Si vous voulez Madame by Émile Goudeau.

His works were published by Enoch et Cie, who produced the material for the shadow shows.

He died in Asnières on 19 February 1920

== Works ==
- The Sphynx (1896) Lyrical epic with sixteen paintings, poetry and music by Georges Fragerolle, shadows and decorations by Amédée Vignola
- The prodigal child (1895). Biblical parable in seven paintings by Georges Fragerolle, drawings by Henri Rivière. 1895
- The march to the star. Mystery in one act and ten paintings by Henri Rivière, music by Georges Fragerolle
- The Wandering Jew. Legend in eight paintings by Henri Rivière, music by Georges Fragerolle
- The Temptation of St. Anthony. Magic extravaganza in 2 acts and 40 paintings by Henri Rivière, presented for the first time on the stage of the Black Cat on 28 December 1887, new music and arrangements by Albert Tinchant and Georges Fragerolle
- Moonlight magic. In six paintings, poem and music by Georges Fragerolle, drawings by Henri Rivière
- The Way of the Cross. Oratorio in 15 paintings, scenario, drawings and projections by P. Lamouche, poem and music by Georges Fragerolle.
- Marlborough Goes to War! Heroic fantasy 10 paintings, poetry and music by Georges Fragerolle, shadows by Courboin
- Joan of Arc. Epic in fifteen paintings, music by Georges Fragerolle and Desveaux-Vérité, drawings by Henri Callot
- The dream of Joel. 11 paintings. Georges Fragerolle, shadows by Louis Bombled, represented for the first time at the Lion d'Or and reshown at the Chat Noir
- Legend of Canada. Lyrical epic with animated shadows by Georges Fragerolle
- The Divine Child. Collection of old country Christmas carols from Champagne and Lorraine, set to music by Georges Fragerolle
- Lourdes. Poem by Georges Fragerolle and Desveaux-Vérité
- Bressan Christmas. Gabriel Vicaire and Georges Fragerolle
- Songs of French soldiers. Poems and drawings of G. Tiret-Bognet
