= Bristol board =

Type of uncoated paperboard

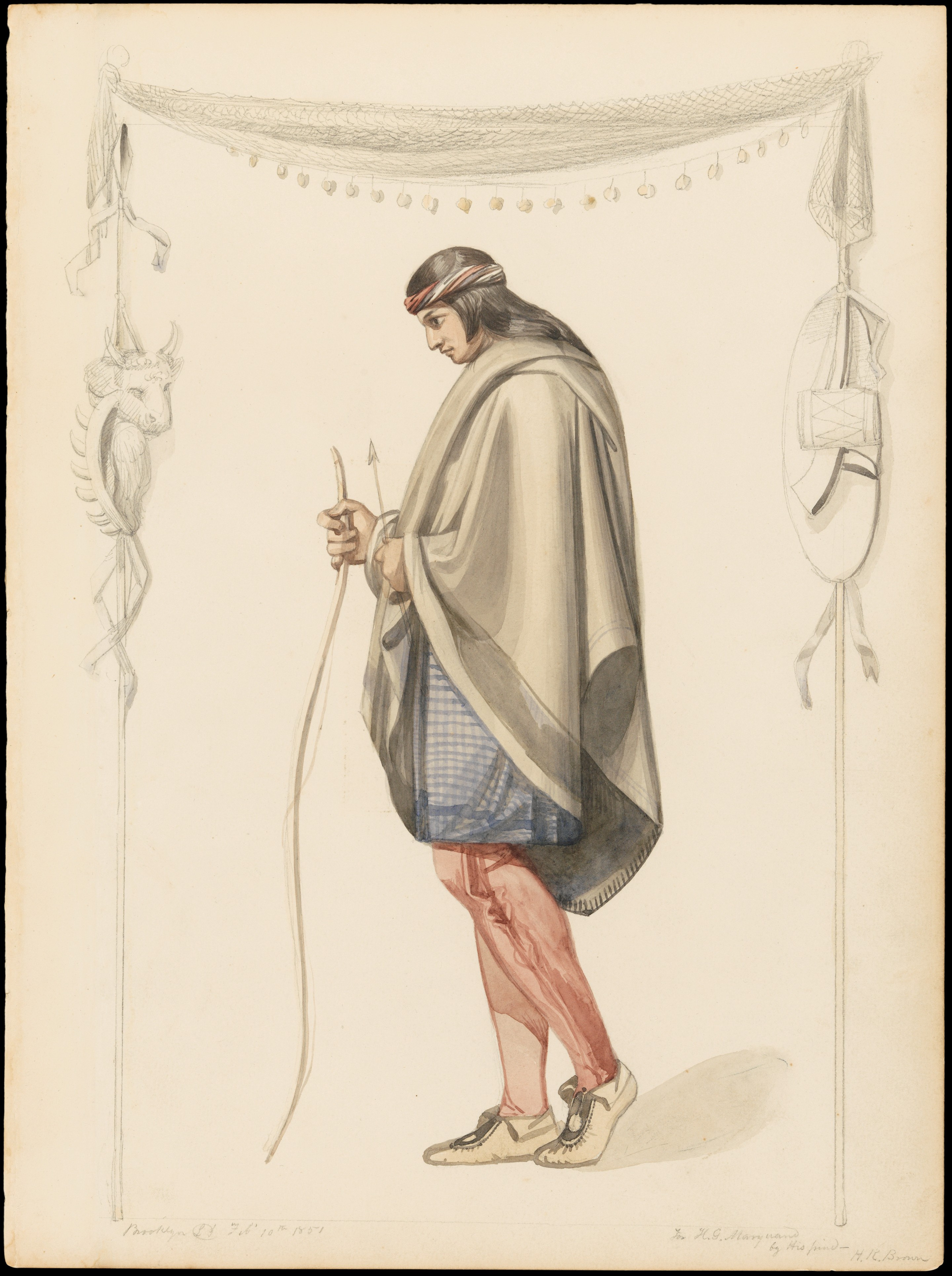
Watercolor and graphite on thin off-white gilt-edged Bristol board

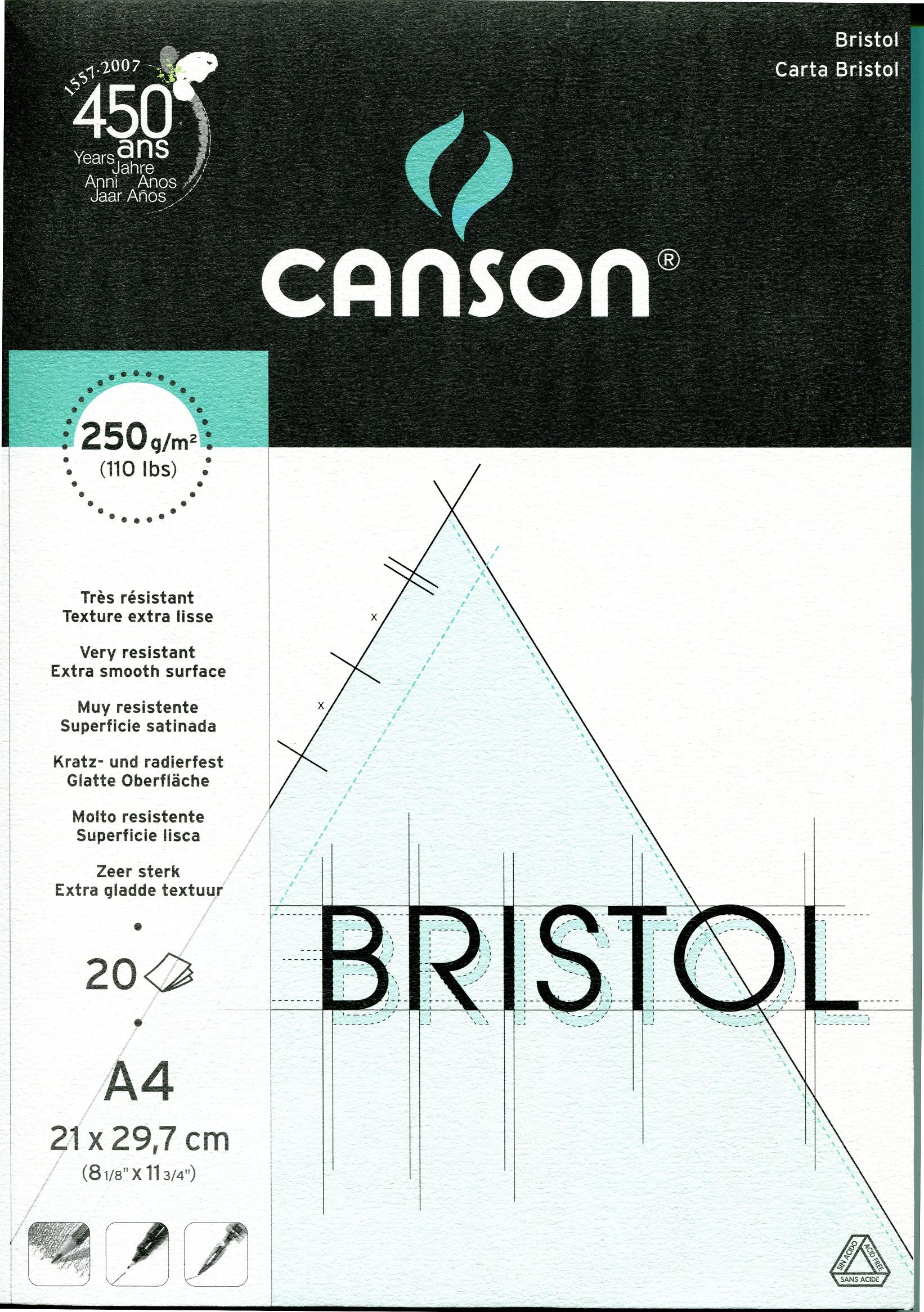
French-made Bristol paper packaging

Bristol board (also referred to as Bristol paper or super white paper) is an uncoated, machine-finished paperboard.

== History ==
It is named not after the city of Bristol in the southwest of England but rather after Frederick Hervey, 4th Earl of Bristol, a prolific art collector.

== Sizes ==
Common sizes include 22 1/2 in × 28 1/2 in (572 mm × 724 mm) and its bulk thickness is 0.006 inches (0.15 mm) or higher and A4, A3, A2 and A1. Bristol board may be rated by the number of plies it contains, basis weight, or, in Europe, by its grammage of 220 to 250 g/m^{2}. It is normally white, but is also made in different colours.

== Applications ==
Bristol paper is used for printing documents, brochures, promotional materials and envelopes. It is often used for watercolor painting. It is also used for paperback book or catalog covers, file folders, tags, and tickets. Another use is for scale models; some students use this kind of paper for the walls in their scale models. One-ply Bristol is thin enough to be translucent, and two- and three-ply Bristol are the most popular thicknesses.

Bristol board is commonly used for technical drawing, illustration projects, comic book art, and other two-dimensional art forms. It provides two working surfaces, front and back. This quality separates it from illustration board, which has only a front working surface.

The surface texture is usually either plate or vellum. Plate finish is as smooth as glass, and is very good for pen and ink. Vellum (or kid) finish is a medium texture more appropriate to friction-based media, such as crayon, chalks, or charcoal. A third finish, engravers or wedding, may be used for formal engraved wedding invitations.
