= Émile Goudeau =

French journalist, novelist and poet (1849–1906)

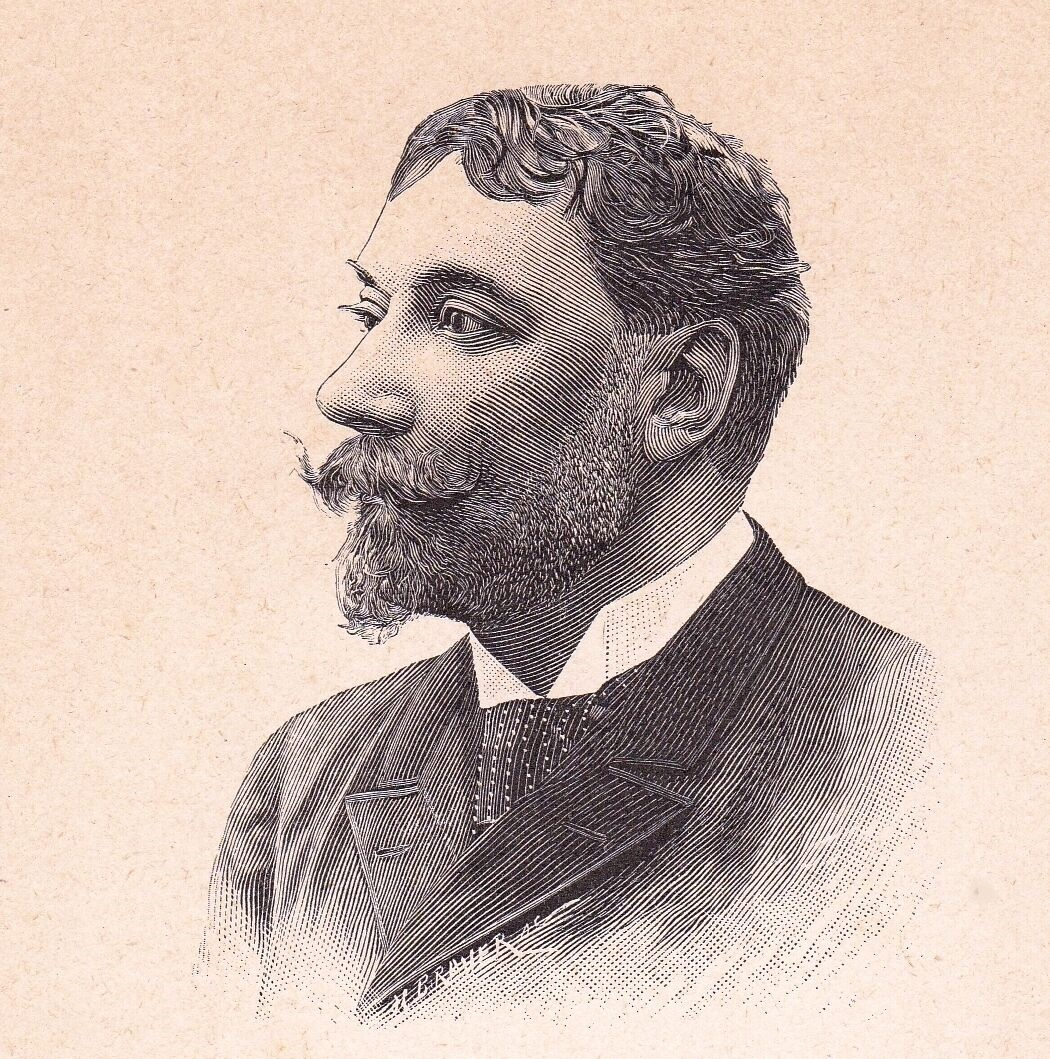
- Born: 29 August 1849; Périgueux, Dordogne, France
- Died: September 18, 1906 (aged 57)
- Occupations: Journalist, novelist and poet
- Known for: Founder of The Hydropathes club

Émile Goudeau (French pronunciation: [emil ɡudo]; 29 August 1849 – 18 September 1906) was a French journalist, novelist and poet. He was the founder of the Hydropathes literary club.

== Life ==
He was born in Périgueux, Dordogne, the son of Germain Goudeau, an architect, and cousin of Léon Bloy. Goudeau studied at the seminary, and then was supervisor in different high schools before becoming an employee at the Ministry of Finance, which gave him the opportunity to devote most of his time to poetry.

According to Maurice Donnay:

Émile Goudeau was from Périgord. He had a very brown complexion, very black hair and beard, a pronounced squint made him look fierce, but he was a very brave man, and he had much talent, which was original and tasty like wine ... Émile Goudeau had genius, just like that of the Duc Soulografiesky, his thirst was that of the Danaïdes. (Note: The story of the Danaïdes is part of Greek Mythology. They are condemned to spend eternity carrying water in a sieve or perforated device. Goudeau's thirst could never be satisfied.) Anyway, Émile Goudeau chaired the meetings of the Hydropathes with bonhomie and authority.

Goudeau founded the Hydropathes (Note: Hydropaths are afraid of water, thinking other drinks such as wine or absinthe are safer.) society on 11 October 1878. According to Goudeau, the name came from the Hydropathen-valsh (Waltz of the Hydropaths) by the Hungarian-German musician Joseph Gungl. (Note: Another explanation for the name is that the Hydropathe is a Canadian animal with crystal paws, which are used as champagne glasses.) The purpose of the society was to promote the works of the members. The Hydropathes Café in the rue Cujas was a large hall that could accommodate several hundred people. The society staged evening entertainments in the form of poetry or prose readings and songs. The society published a journal for about year, starting in January 1879, containing writings and pictures by members of the society.

The Hydropathes drank heavily in the bohemian way of that time, particularly green absinthe, which was rampant. Goudeau paid his collaborators in drink, and this salary was fatal to the most gifted of them, Jules Jouy.

The Hydropathic Club gave rise to the fumist movement, the word fumism itself was coined by Émile Goudeau, and Georges Fragerolle, Eugène Bataille and Alphonse Allais took up his invention.

At first the Hydropathes met on the Left Bank, but when Rodolphe Salis opened his cabaret, Le Chat Noir, in December 1881, he persuaded Goudeau to move the society there. Goudeau helped Salis to launch his journal Le Chat Noir, which first appeared on 14 January 1882, drawing on his experience with the Hydropathes journal. Goudeau was chief editor of Le Chat Noir from 1882 to 1884.

Much of the Hydropathes' backstory -- including the name, the music, the drinking, the performances, the poetry, etc., the many poets, musicians, and performers (famous and not so famous), as well as the reasons for organizing it in the first place, -- is found in Goudeau's memoir, Dix ans de bohème. The ten years in question are most likely 1874-1884, which is from the time Goudeau first arrived in Paris (1874), "très timide de tempérament, très audacieux de volonté" ("very timid in temperament, very audacious in will"), to when he left his position of chief editor at Le Chat Noir journal.

== Works ==
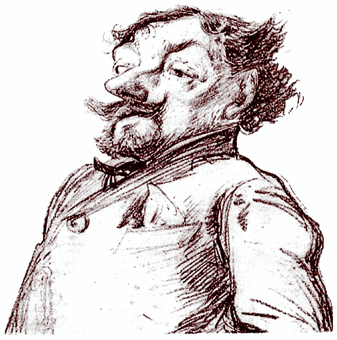
Caricature of Émile Goudeau

- 1878: Fleurs du bitume (In English translation: Flowers of Bitumen: Sunny Lou Publishing, ISBN 978-1735477664, 2021)
- 1884: Poèmes ironiques (Ironic Poems)
- 1884: La Revanche des bêtes (Revenge of the beasts)
- 1885: La Vache enragée (Note: Manger La Vache enragée means to go hungry.) (The Angry Cow): novel
- 1886: Voyages et découvertes du célèbre A'Kempis à travers les États-Unis de Paris (Travels and discoveries of famous A'Kempis across the United States from Paris): Fantasy, with drawings by Henri Rivière
- 1887: Les Billets bleus (The Blue Tickets): novel
- 1887: Le Froc: novel
- 1888: Dix ans de bohème (Ten bohemian years): memoirs, The Illustrated Library, Paris, 1888; reissued by Champ Vallon, Paris, 2000. (In English translation: Ten Years a Bohemian: Sunny Lou Publishing, ISBN 978-1735477695, 2021)
- 1889: Corruptrice (Corrupter): novel
- 1893: Paris qui consomme (The Paris who consumes) : fantasy
- 1896: Chansons de Paris et d'ailleurs (Songs of Paris and elsewhere)
- 1897: Poèmes parisiens (Parisian Poems)
- 1900: La Graine humaine (The Human Grain): novel

== Tribute ==
The Place Émile-Goudeau in the 18th arrondissement of Paris is named in his honor. It is on Montmartre hill just below the Place du Tertre.

== English-language translations ==
- Flowers of Bitumen. Publisher: Sunny Lou Publishing, ISBN 978-1735477664, 2021.
- Ten Years a Bohemian. Publisher: Sunny Lou Publishing, ISBN 978-1735477695, 2021.
- Upside-Down Stories. Compiled and translated by Doug Skinner (Black Scat Books, ISBN 978-1732350687, 2019).
