= Léon Jonathan =

Léon Jonathan was a 19th-century French playwright and chansonnier.

== Biography ==
His plays were presented at the Théâtre Beaumarchais and the Théâtre du Château-d'Eau. He met great success with his plays Pierre Vaux, l'instituteur and Carnot, a 5-act drama given on the stage of the Théâtre de l'Ambigu in 1884. Then no further mention of him is known. It is possible, judging by the contentious parts of his plays that the name was a non yet elucidated pseudonym.

== Works ==
- 1880 Le Ménétrier de Meudon, opéra comique in 3 acts, with Gaston Marot, music by Germain Laurens
- 1881: La Convention nationale, drama in 6 acts and 8 tableaux
- 1882: Pierre Vaux, l'instituteur, drama in 5 acts and 7 tableaux, with Louis Péricaud
- 1884: Déjeuner du jour de l'an, comédie en vaudeville in 1 act, with Charles Desmarest
- 1884: Carnot, drama in 5 acts, with Henri Blondeau and William Busnach
- undated: Le Réveil du pauvre homme, song

== Bibliography ==
- Les milles et une nuits du théâtre, vol.9, 1894, (p. 203) (analyse de la pièce Pierre Vaux, l'instituteur)
- Philippe Chauveau, Les théâtres parisiens disparus: 1402-1986, 1999, (p. 144-145)
