= Georges Lamothe =

French composer and organist

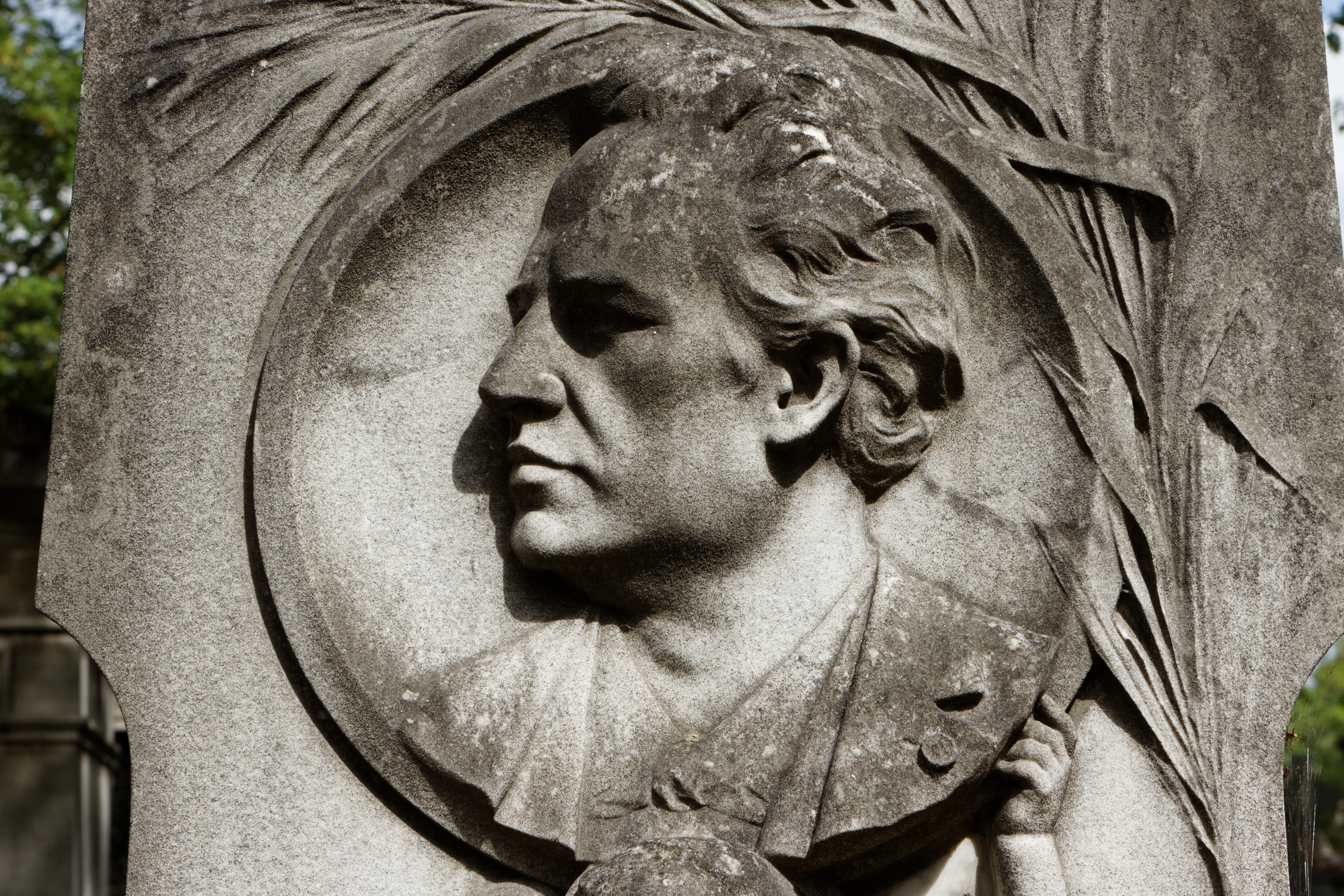
- Lamothe, portrait on tombstone
- Born: 1842; Paris, France
- Died: 15 October 1894 (aged 51–52); Courbevoie, Hauts-de-Seine
- Occupations: Composer, pianist and organist

Marie Émile Georges Lamothe (1842 – 15 October 1894) was a prolific French composer, pianist and harmonium player. Apart from a large number of salon pieces for the piano, he was also known as an accompanist to popular theatrical performances including puppet plays.

== Career ==
Lamothe was born in Paris in 1842, the exact date cannot be established. Baker's Dictionary, which wrongly claims that he was born in 1837, also states that his work-list exceeded "over 1,000 op.-numbers". In contrast, the online catalogue of the French national library (Bibliothèque nationale de France), counts 503 entries under his name, which also includes arrangements of Lamothe's works by other composers. The highest opus number in this catalogue is 310, but many other works are listed without opus numbers, and around 15 to 20 opus numbers have been allocated two or three works. The exact quantity of works aside, he certainly was a very productive composer, with his first publications appearing in 1861 when he was barely 19 years of age.

His parents were Jean Paul Émile Alexandre Lamothe, a lawyer, and Marie Madeleine Désirée, née Chatelain. No information about his teachers or places of musical education has survived. He may have been a student of the Paris Conservatory, but his name is not included in publications that listed prize-winners of this institution.

The contemporary French press often described him as an organist; for example, an 1881 issue of Le Figaro called him the "organist of Her Majesty, the Queen of Spain", and, in fact, he received the title "Organiste de la Chambre royale de Sa Majesté la reine Isabella II d'Espagne" in December 1878. However, although he performed in Spain, he is not recorded as ever having spent any extended period of time at the Spanish court, so it must have been an honorary title only. Furthermore, this activity should not be confused with that of a church organist. Lamothe wrote for and performed on a portable "orgue expressif", better known as harmonium. On a number of public occasions, Lamothe promoted the products of the harmonium maker "Alexandre père et fils", for example at the World Exposition (Exposition Universelle) in Paris of 1889. An 1882 newspaper notice mentions him as giving teaching courses on the "orgue-harmonium" in the Salons Mangeot, 21 avenue de l'Opéra, Paris. As a performer on the piano and the harmonium, Lamothe enjoyed international popularity: besides performing all over France, in Spain and Portugal, he also toured through England in 1875 and the United States for two months in 1876.

== Incidental music and accompaniments ==
Lamothe's main musical activity appears to have been writing and performing incidental music for theatrical productions, including puppet plays. In 1864, Lamothe became a member of "Les Pierrots", a Parisian group of artists convened by the actor Montrouge, alongside Jean-François Berthelier, Coquelin Cadet, Joseph Darcier, Léon Fusier, Félix Galipaux, Eugène Silvain, and others. He was also a member of the "Pupazzi" of Louis Lemercier de Neuville (1830–1918), a group of puppet players performing all over France. In Paris, these shows were frequently performed in the Théâtre Robert-Houdin, with Lamothe being a close collaborator of its founder, the magician Jean-Eugène Robert-Houdin, for whose productions he was one of the accompanists on the piano. Compositions like La Malle des Indes, Op. 161 (1876) and Une Soirée chez Robert-Houdin (1890) are dedicated to Robert-Houdin.

In his autobiography (1911), Lemercier de Neuville included a list of the accompanists that he worked with in the course of his career. It lists, among others, Georges Bizet, Charles Gounod, Gustave Nadaud, Léo Delibes, Edmond Audran, and Georges Lamothe. As composers who wrote specific music for his plays he included, besides Lamothe, Charles Domergue de la Chaussée, Olivier Métra, Émile Pessard, and Albert Renaud.

== Honours ==
Apart from the title of the Queen of Spain's organist (1878), he was also decorated in Spain with the Cross of the Order of Isabella the Catholic. In 1879 he was made a Chevalier of the Order of Christ (from the King of Portugal, 1879), and he received the Cross of the Order of Charles III (from the King of Spain, 1885). In France, he was named an "Officier de l'Instruction Publique" in January 1890, an honour bestowed by the French government on distinguished teachers, also known as "Golden Palms" of the Ordre des Palmes académiques.

== Death ==
Lamothe died suddenly in Courbevoie, Département Hauts-de-Seine, aged 52. According to the newspaper Le Figaro, he died from a stomach abscess; the music journal Le Ménestrel reported that he had suffered for three days from an infectious stomach disease. He was buried in the Père-Lachaise cemetery in Paris, Division 44.

== Selected compositions ==
=== Stage ===
- Tout Paris (puppet show for the "Pupazzi" of Louis Lemercier de Neuville), Paris, Théâtre Robert-Houdin, 19 November 1886
- Polichinelle et la mort (libretto: Evariste Mangin and Paul Eudel), 1 act, Paris, Théâtre d’Application, 13 January 1892

=== Piano music ===
- Le Collier d'ambre. Polka (1861)
- Le Feu follet. Polka, Op. 3 (1862)
- Italia. Polka brillante, Op. 5 (c.1862)
- Bouquet de roses. Polka-mazurka, Op. 17 (1866)
- Impériale, Polka brillante, Op. 21 (1866)
- Croquetaine. Polka -mazurka, Op. 22 (1866)
- Salut à la France. Scène maritime, Op. 24 (1866)
- Coquillette. Polka, Op. 26 (1866)
- Franconi. Polka élégante, Op. 27 (1866)
- Voilà l'plaisir, mesdames, Polka brillante, Op. 28 (1865)
- En Avant, Polka militaire, Op. 30 (1866)
- Sur la montagne. Harmonie du soir, Op. 31 (1866)
- Dormez ma belle. Berceuse, Op. 32 (1866)
- Altorf. Polka-mazurka, Op. 33 (1866)
- Promenade militaire. Fantaisie, Op. 34 (1866)
- Valse des perles, Op. 35 (1866)
- Au clair de la lune. Variations brillantes, Op. 36 (1866)
- Phoebé. Valse, Op. 41 (1866)
- Valse des amoureuses, Op. 42 (1865)
- Mandarine. Polka-mazurka, Op. 44 (1867)
- Fanfare-polka, Op. 45 (1867)
- Fleurs des champs. Trois danses, Op. 49 (1869)
- Eliane. Polka mazurka, Op. 50 (1867)
- Bella. Valse, Op. 51 (1867)
- Caprice espagnol. Morceau de salon, Op. 52 (1867)
- Promenade champêtre. Fantaisie pastorale, Op. 56 (1868)
- Cachucha-mazurk, Op. 57 (1868)
- Lisbonne. Boléro, Op. 58 (1868)
- Marche des souverains, Op. 60 (1868)
- A Midsummer Night’s Dream. Musique de scène, Op. 61 (1868)
- La Danse des roses. Air de ballet, Op. 62 (1868)
- Le Jardin des rêves. Mazurka, Op. 63 (1868)
- Pirouette. Polka, Op 64 (1868)
- La Lanterne. Polka mazurka, Op. 65 (1868)
- Poésie. Caprice, Op. 66 (1869)
- Un Souvenir. Étude de salon, Op. 67 (1869)
- Le Premier baiser. Valse, Op. 68 (1869)
- La Sympathique. Grande valse de salon, Op. 69 (1869)
- La Charmeuse. Valse, Op. 70 (1869)
- Soupir des feuilles. Rêverie-mazurka, Op. 71 (1869)
- Les Larmes. Rêverie musicale, Op. 72 (1869)
- Evohé. Chanson à boire, Op. 74 (1869)
- Les Saisons. Quatre fantaisies-études, Op. 75 (1869)
- La Napolitaine. Tarentelle, Op. 76 (1869)
- Le Val des fées. Mazurka de salon, Op. 80 (1869)
- France. Transcription militaire du choeur d'Ambroise Thomas, Op. 81 (1869)
- Marche vénitienne, Op. 82 (1870)
- Tolède. Boléro, Op. 84 (1870)
- Désespérance. Rêverie nocturne, Op. 85 (1870)
- Les Cloches de Pâques. Carillon avec variations sur l'hymne 'O filii', Op. 86 (1870)
- Frétillon-polka, Op. 87 (1870)
- Ko-Kli-Ko. Polka chinoise, Op. 90 (1870)
- Brise des nuits. Valse, Op. 91 (1870)
- Gavotte Pompadour, transcrite et variée, Op. 95 (1870)
- Chants d’Alsace, Op. 100 (1871)
- La Marseillaise. Transcription militaire, Op. 101 (1870)
- Les Rives de l'Arno. Rêverie italienne, Op. 102 (1972)
- Eclat de rire. Polka fantaisie, Op. 103 (1872)
- Mélancolie. Valse, Op. 104 (1872)
- Buisson d'écrevisses. Polka, Op. 121 (1872)
- Un Désir. Suite de valses (1872)
- Les Délices, Valse, Op. 122 (1873)
- Danse arabe, Op. 133 (1873)
- La Fiancée. Valse brillante, Op. 135 (1873)
- Fontainebleau. Valse fanfare, Op. 136 (1874)
- Turquoise. Polka, Op. 138 (1874)
- Or et azur. Valse, Op. 139 (1874)
- Nuit et jour. Grande valse, Op. 155 (1874)
- Barque jolie. Grande valse sur des motifs de Victor Robillard, Op. 156 (1876)
- La Fée de la nuit. Valse brillante, sur les motifs de Ch. Pourny, Op. 157 (1876)
- Madrigal de François 1er (1519), recueilli et transcrit, Op. 158 (1875)
- Les Bersagliers. Caprice militaire, Op. 159 (1876)
- Carnaval parisien. Fantaisie burlesque, Op. 160 (1875)
- La Malle des Indes. Galop brillant, Op. 161 (1876)
- Tramway-galop, Op. 163 (1876)
- Frascati. Valse, Op. 169 (1875)
- Songes roses. Suite de valses, Op. 170 (1875)
- Nuit d'Orient. Grande valse de salon, Op. 171 (1875)
- Le Message des fleurs. Valse, Op. 172 (1876)
- Le Pays des songes. Valse, Op. 174 (1876)
- Les Archers d'Armagnac. Morceau caractéristique, Op. 175 (1876)
- Rêverie sur l'eau. Barcarolle, Op. 176 (1876)
- Primavera. Mazurka, Op. 177 (1875)
- Royale gavotte, Op. 178 (1877)
- Chacone du bon vieux temps, Op. 179 (1877)
- Menuet du Roi, Op. 181 (1877)
- La Petite mariée, opéra bouffe de Ch. Lecocq. Fantaisie brillante, Op. 182 (1876)
- Le Réveil du régiment. Marche, Op. 185 (1875)
- Le Vieux Paris. Ronde nocturne, Op. 193 (1876)
- Etendard. Polka, Op. 196 (1876)
- Lulu-galop, Op. 197 (1876)
- Acrobate-galop, Op. 197 (1877)
- Flamberge au vent. Caprice militaire, Op. 198 (1877)
- Cavalcade-galop, Op. 202 (1877)
- Le Palanquin. Marche indienne, Op. 206 (1878)
- France et Navarre. Air ancien attribué à Henri IV, Op. 207 (1877)
- Rosée du matin. Valse brillante, Op. 208 (1877)
- Dora. Valse espagnole, Op. 209 (1877)
- Toujours et encore. Valse, Op. 211 (1878)
- Pour un sourire. Valse, Op. 212 (1878)
- Souvenir du village, Op. 214 (1879)
- La Petite muette, opéra-comique en 3 actes de Gaston Serpette. Fantaisie, Op. 215 (1878)
- La Fée des bruyères. Valse, Op. 216 (1879)
- La Bayadère. Air de ballet, Op. 217 (1879)
- Castor et Pollux, de Rameau. Mosaïque, Op. 218 (1879)
- Varsovie. Impromptu-mazurka, Op. 219 (1879)
- Brune et blonde. Valse brillante, Op. 220 (1878)
- Marche funèbre, Op. 221 (1878)
- Toujours à toi. Valse, Op. 223 (1879)
- Rêverie d'automne, Op. 224 (1879)
- Sous la feuillée. Rêverie-nocturne, Op. 225 (1879)
- Ciel de feu. Suite de valses, Op. 229 (1880)
- Gavotte de la Reine, Op. 236 (1881)
- Les Chevaliers du guet. Caprice militaire, Op. 237 (1881)
- La Corrida de los torros. Souvenir andaloux, caprice, Op. 242 (1880)
- Gavotte de Vestris, Op. 246 (1881)
- Chanson du vert-galant, Op. 247 (1882)
- Royal-défilé. Caprice militaire, Op. 253 (1882)
- C'est un rêve. Suite de valses sur la célèbre mélodie anglaise 'Dreaming' de Milton Wellings (1883)
- Un Jour. Suite de valses sur la célèbre mélodie anglaise 'Some Day' de Milton Wellings (1883)
- Lakmé, opéra de Léo Delibes. Caprice-valse (1883)
- François les bas bleus, opéra-comique en 3 actes de F. Bernicat et A. Messager. Fantaisie brillante, Op. 260 (1884)
- Sigurd, opéra de E. Reyer. Valse (1884)
- Vivette. Polka-mazurka sur les motifs du ballet 'La Farandole' de Théodore Dubois (1884)
- Marche des pupazzi. Mirlitonade, Op. 271 (1886)
- Sur la falaise. Rêverie-nocturne, Op. 273 (1886)
- Gavotte Marion de Lorme, Op. 274 (1886)
- Pavane Renaissance, Op. 278 (1886)
- Souvenir de Hongrie (Eljen!). Caprice, Op. 279 (1886)
- Tunis-marche, Op. 280 (1886)
- Le Cid. Valse sur les motifs de J. Massenet (1886)
- Marche des maillotins, Op. 283 (1888)
- Bagdad-marche. Polka-marche, Op. 288 (1889)
- Pendant la valse. Impromptu, Op. 301 (1887)
- Les Femmes de France. Valse (1887)
- Marche des chameliers. Souvenir d'Orient, Op. 302 (1889)
- Retraité française. Caprice militaire, Op. 303 (1889)
- Le Roi Soleil. Célèbre menuet Louis XIV, Op. 304 (1889)
- Derrière l'éventail. Marivandage, Op. 305 (1889)
- Une Soirée chez Robert-Houdin. Quadrille (1890)
- France et Russie. Caprice militaire, Op. 306 (1891)
- Veillées d'automne. Six pièces caractéristiques sans octaves (piano 4-hand), Op. 308 (1891)
- Pierre fines. Six danses faciles sans octaves, Op. 309 (1891)
- Soirées d'hiver. Six morceaux caractéristiques sans octaves, Op. 310 (1891)
- Côte d'azur, Valse (1894)

=== Organ and harmonium music ===
- Le Fremersberg (1864)
- Loin du monde. Méditation, Op. 10 No. 31 (1864)
- Souvenirs du 'Capitaine Henriot', de Gevaert. Fantaisie brillante, Op. 14 (1865)
- Fantaisie brillante sur des motifs du 'Chalet', opéra d'Adolphe Adam, Op. 25 (1865)
- Une Fête aux champs. Fantaisie pastorale, Op. 37 (1866)
- Le Réveil des anges. Prière, Op. 88 (1870)

=== Duos for piano and organ/harmonium ===
- Impromptu villageois, Op. 12 (1866)
- Souvenir du St. Bernard. Angelus, Op. 13 (1865)
- Les Roses. Valse, Op. 162 (1875)
- Guillaume Tell. Grand duo, Op. 183 (1876)
- Paul et Virginie, opéra de Victor Massé. Grand duo, Op. 199 (1877)
- Opéras de Verdi. Six grands duos, Op. 230 (1880)

=== Songs ===
- Quand je n'avais pas de maîtresse. Chansonnette (Paul Laffitte) (1860)
- À l'ours. Cri populaire (Albert Bomier, Eugène Maygrier) (1867)
- La Cabaretière. Chanson (E. Maygrier, A. Bomier) (1868)
- On n'a jamais fait d'om'lette. Paysannerie (E. Maygrier, A. Bomier) (1868)
- Les Regrets de Suzette. Rêverie (1868)
- Les Moissons. Chant villageois (G. Valpian, A. Bomier) (1868)
- C'est pas fort. Exclamation populaire (Charles Blondelet, Félix Baumaine) (1868)
- Adieu printemps. Mélodie (Victor Luciennes) (1870)
- Ton nom. Mélodie (Alexandre Barbarroux) (1870)

== Bibliography ==
- David Baptie: A Handbook of Musical Biography (London: W. Morley & Co., 1883; reprint edited by Bernarr Rainbow: Clarabricken, Co. Kilkenny: Boethius Press, 1986)
- Franz Stieger: Opernlexikon. Komponisten, vol. 2 (Tutzing: Hans Schneider, 1977)
- Baker's Biographical Dictionary of Musicians, 3rd edition revised by Alfred Remy (New York and Boston: G. Schirmer, 1919), p. 506.
