= Miss Helyett =

Miss Helyett may refer to:

- Miss Helyett (opera), an 1890 opérette by Edmond Audran
  - Miss Helyett (1928 film), a French film based on the above
  - Miss Helyett (1933 film), a French film based on the above
