= Bordet (disambiguation) =

Bordet may make reference to:

== People ==
- Gustavo Bordet, Argentine governor
- Jules Bordet, Belgian immunologist and microbiologist
- Michel Bordet, French playwright
- Robert d'Aguiló, Norman knight, also known as Robert Bordet

== Medicine ==
- Bordet–Gengou agar, a type of agar plate
- The Wassermann test, also known as the Bordet–Wassermann test

== Places ==
- Bordet railway station in Belgium
- Institut Jules Bordet, hospital and university in Belgium
