= Miss Helyett (opera) =

Poster for the first production, 1890

Miss Helyett is an opérette in three acts with music by Edmond Audran and words by Maxime Boucheron. It depicts the complications ensuing when the excessively puritanical heroine believes herself duty-bound to marry an unknown man who, in rescuing her from a serious fall in the Pyrenees, has been unable to avoid seeing the exposed lower half of her body.

The piece was first performed at the Théâtre des Bouffes-Parisiens on 12 November 1890. Productions followed in continental Europe, Britain, the US and Australia. The most recent revival in Paris was in 1921, and the piece remained popular in the French provinces during the next two decades, but fell out of the repertoire after that.

== Background and first production ==
By 1890 Audran was a well-established composer of opérette and opéra comique, with 18 full-length pieces to his credit, including the very popular La mascotte (1880). Boucheron was also experienced, having written librettos for Paul Burani, Georges Grisier, André Martinet and others. This was the first of the three operas on which the two men collaborated. The premiere was marred by the illness of the leading lady, Biana Duhamel, whose performance was hampered by a cold, but the work was nevertheless a success, and played for 166 performances in its first run.

== Original cast ==
- Smithson – M. Montrouge
- Paul – M. Piccaluga
- Puycardas – M. Tauffenberger
- James – M. Jannin
- Bacarel – M. Désiré
- Gandol – M. Wolff
- Miss Helyett – Mdlle. Biana Duhamel
- La Senora – Madame Macé-Montrouge
- Manuela – Mdlle. Saint-Laurent
- Norette – Mdlle. Mary Stelly
- Ida – Mdlle. Meryem
- Eva – Mdlle. Suzanne-Nery
- Marguerite – Mdlle. Cora-Bertte
- Rosa – Mdlle. Derieu

Source: Vocal score.

== Synopsis ==
=== Act I ===
The Ballroom of the Casino-Hotel Val-Montois, Bagnères (Pyrenees)

Miss Helyett Smithson is a beautiful but excessively prudish 16 1/2-year-old American. She is the eleventh, youngest, and only unmarried daughter of a nonconformist pastor, Smithson, with whom she is revisiting Bagnères after a two-year interval. She dresses in a costume similar to that of the Salvation Army, and remarks adversely on the revealing dresses of the other young women in the ballroom. Other guests at the hotel include Paul, an artist; unlike most of the guests he is not there for pleasure but to paint. He concentrates on landscapes, although what he longs for and cannot find is his ideal woman to paint. Helyett and he have met during her previous visit, but he pays little attention to her, still thinking of her as the fourteen-year-old child he met previously.

Also at the hotel are Puycardas, a Gascon bullfighter, and his Spanish girlfriend Manuela, closely supervised by her mother, Senora Fernandez, who is not keen on the prospect of having Puycardas, a pusillanimous Frenchman, as her son-in-law. Smithson's party includes also James Richter, a young Chicago merchant, who is a possible husband for Helyett. She is not greatly taken with him, but has said that she will marry him if she finds no-one better in the next three months.

Helyett goes off every day for a walk in the mountains. Today she returns shaken and distressed. She lost her footing and fell down a precipice; her fall was broken by a shrub as her skirt was caught on a branch. A passer-by rescued her, but, mortified by being seen with her lower half exposed, she covered her face with her cloak, and so could not see him before he left after extricating her. She tells her father that it is her duty to marry this man, whoever he is, because he has seen what only a husband should see.

=== Act II ===
The gardens of the hotel

Helyett and Smithson draw a blank in their search for her rescuer. Smithson, anxious to get his last daughter married, suggests to James that he pose as her deliverer. He does so and she accordingly accepts his proposal of marriage. He hurries off to bring the news to Smithson. Helyett finds Paul's sketch book and starts to flick through it, before the artist unceremoniously reclaims it. Among the drawings she does not see is one of her exposed legs: Paul, her real rescuer, is too much of a gentleman to have removed her cloak to see her face, but too much of an artist not to want to draw her exquisite legs. Their spirited exchange when he snatches his sketch-book away from her makes him realise that Helyett is no longer a girl but a young woman, and makes her more aware of his attractiveness. James returns and admits that he lied about being Helyett's rescuer. She then overhears a row between Puycardas and Senora Fernandez, during which the former tries to impress the latter by claiming to have rescued a young woman in the mountains. Helyett publicly announces that she will marry him.

=== Act III ===
The ballroom

Paul has come to realise that he is in love with Helyett; he laments her plans to marry the bullfighter. Puycardas loves Manuela, but cowed by Smithson's revolver he agrees to marry Helyett. Manuela, outraged, transfers her attentions to James. Paul and Helyett admit their mutual love, but she still feels obliged to marry the man who rescued her. She sees his sketch of her and realises that it was he who found her. She accepts his proposal of marriage.

Source: Gänzl and Lamb; The Era; and Académie Nationale de l’Opérette.

== Numbers ==
- Act I
  - Introduction
  - Valse et quadrille du Casino
  - Cantique – Helyett, James, Smithson: "Le Maître qui d'en haut" (The master who from above)
  - Air – Paul, les coryphées: "Pour peindre une beauté complète" (To paint a complete beauty)
  - Duetto espagnol – Manuela, Puycardas: "Je vous vis, vous me subjugâtes!" (I saw you, you subjugated me!)
  - Couplets – Helyett: "Déjà, dans ma plus tendre enfance" (Already, in my early childhood)
  - Terzetto – Helyett, James, Smithson: "Certes, j'aimerais mieux connaître" (Certainly, I would like to know better)
  - Triolets – Paul: "Que ne puis-je la rencontrer" (What can I not meet?)
  - Gavotte et reprise du cantique – Helyett, Smithson: . "Le Maître qui d'en haut" (The master who from above)
- Act II
  - Entr'acte
  - Chanson des petits guides – "Pour grimper aux Pyrénées" (To climb the Pyrenees)
  - Duettino de l'album – Paul, Bacarel: "Ah! le superbe point de vue" (Ah! the superb viewpoint)
  - Couplets – Helyett: "Avez-vous vu ramper une lionne" (Have you seen a lioness creeping)
  - Duetto de l'homme de la montagne – James, Helyett: "Oui, je suis, par ma foi" (Yes, I am, by my faith)
  - Couplets – Paul, Helyett: "Ce qui donne à toute femme" (What is given to every woman)
  - Terzetto bouffe – La Senora, Puycardas, Manuela: "Reconnaissez en moi la mère" (Recognise in me a mother)
  - Final II "Ami que l'on me félicite" (Friend whom we welcome)
- Act III
  - Entr'acte
  - Ensemble – "Avez-vous vu ce scandale?" (Have you heard this scandal?)
  - Terzetto – Manuela, Helyett, Puycardas: "Ne suis-je pas celle qui t'aime" (Am I not the one who loves you?)
  - Duetto – Puycardas, La Senora: "C'en est fait, il faut nous quitter" (It's done, we must leave)
  - Duo du portrait – Paul, Helyett: "Pour que votre image adorée" (For your adored image)
  - Couplet final – Paul, Bacarel: "Ah! quel public admirable!" (Ah! what an admirable audience!)

Source: Vocal score.

== Revivals and adaptations ==
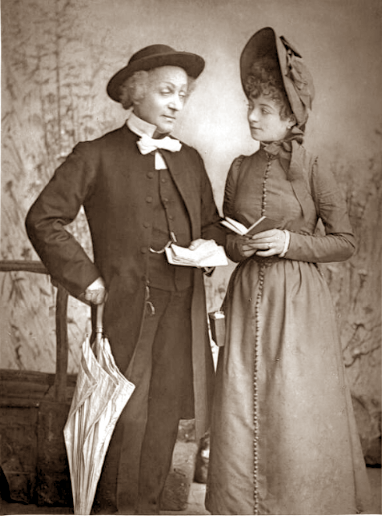
David James and Juliette Nesville in the English adaptation, Miss Decima, 1891

The work was revived at the Bouffes-Parisiens in 1893, 1895, 1896 and 1901. Other Parisian productions were given at the Théâtre des Menus-Plaisirs in 1893, starring Mariette Sully, 1900 at the Théâtre de la Renaissance with Duhamel, Piccaluga and Simon-Max, and the Théâtre des Variétés in 1904 with Ève Lavallière. The last revival in Paris was in 1921 at the Trianon-Lyrique. The Académie Nationale de l’Opérette notes that there were frequent revivals in the French provinces in the mid-20th century, but that the work has since disappeared from the repertoire.

For the first London production, Miss Helyett was retitled Miss Decima. The book was adapted by F. C. Burnand and the lyrics by Percy Reeve. It was produced at the Criterion Theatre on 23 July 1891, starring Juliette Nesville as Decima Jackson and David James as the Rev Jeremie Jackson. The main characters were renamed, and the locale moved from the Pyrenees to the Alps, but the plot was largely unchanged, except for Helyett's reason for insisting on marrying her rescuer: for the benefit of Victorian British audiences, Paul's sight of the heroine's lower half is omitted and his mere physical contact, hauling her from the ravine, is taken as sufficient reason for her to consider herself compromised.

The work was given, in English but under its original title, at the Star Theatre, New York on 3 November 1891, starring Mrs. Leslie Carter. Productions followed in Austria (Vienna, 1891 and 1893), Germany (Berlin, 1891), and Australia (in Burnand's "Miss Decima" version, Sydney, 1896).

The opérette was adapted for the cinema in 1927, with Marie Glory in the title role. A second film based on the work was made in 1933 starring Josette Day as Miss Helyett, Jim Gérald as her father (a professor rather than a clergyman in this adaptation) and Roger Bourdin as Paul.

== Critical reception ==
Reviewing the Paris production The Era found the music "light and pretty, though not as lively as might be desired", and thought the plot flimsy but told in humorous style. The Monthly Musical Record reported that the piece "flows smoothly and simply but without any great originality". Reviewing the English version, The Standard commented that the original French piece was "one of the most gratuitously coarse and offensive plays ever presented" and that Burnand's bowdlerisation of the crux of the plot had produced a piece "equally inoffensive and meaningless"; there was praise for the score: "some extremely bright and pretty music".

== Sources ==
- Audran, Edmond; Maxime Boucheron (1900). Miss Helyett, vocal score. Paris: Choudens. OCLC 844146438.
- Gänzl, Kurt; Andrew Lamb (1988). Gänzl's Book of the Musical Theatre. London: The Bodley Head. OCLC 966051934.
- Goble, Alan (1999). The Complete Index to Literary Sources in Film. London: Bowker-Saur. ISBN 978-1-85739-229-6.
- Noël, Edouard; Edmond Stoullig (1891). Les annales du théâtre et de la musique: 1890 (in French). Paris: G. Charpentier. OCLC 469004564.
