= René Pourrière =

French playwright and chansonnier

René Paul Émile Pourrière (? – 13 January 1945) was a 20th-century French playwright and chansonnier.

== Works ==
- 1908: La Marocaine !, chansonnette militaire, music by F. Vargues
- 1909: Le Front des mamans, music by Odette Vargues
- 1909: Réponse à Pierrot, music by O. Vargues
- 1909: Les trois Billets, music by O. Vargues
- 1909: Vive l'été, music by F. Vargues
- 1910: La Toquette, with Alexandre Trébitsch, music by Félicien Vargues
- 1910: Ah ! Mireille !, music by F. Vargues
- 1910: Le Cœur de Mimi, song, music by F. Vargues
- 1910: Fin d'amour, music by Odette Vargues
- 1910: Le Rêve du gondolier, music by O. Vargues
- 1911: Le joli Modèle, with Maurice Duval, music by F. Vargues
- 1911: Miarka !, song, music by F. Vargues
- 1912: Un sou d'plaisir, song, music by Fernand Heintz
- 1912: Carolina, music by F. Vargues
- 1912: La Dame et le jeune homme, music by F. Vargues
- 1912: Frans, le sonneur, music by F. Vargues
- 1912: La Promise, chanson bretonne, music by Mario
- 1912: La Retraite passe, chanson-marche, music by F. Vargues
- 1913: Mam'zelle Lilas, music by F. Vargues
- 1913: J'aime tes yeux, music by O. Vargues
- 1913: Les Jaloux sont de grands enfants !, valse, music by Edmond Nikelmann
- 1913: Le joli Tour, sérénade vénitienne, music by Alcib Mario
- 1913: La Petite blanchisseuse, chansonnette blanche, music by Jardin
- 1913: Tango d'amour, tango, music by Nikelmann
- 1913: Une Vie de noceur, valse, music by Nikelmann
- 1914: C'est aimable à vous !, diction, music by Léon Terret
- 1914: La Femme à tout le monde. Béguin de fille, valse, music by Raoul Soler
- 1914: Ce n'est que l'Amour !, chansonnette, music by Terret
- 1914: En 1807, retour de la Grande armée, music by Charles Beckand
- 1914: Le Président de la République, chanson humoristique, music by Alcib Mario
- 1914: Tristan, le jeune homme triste, music by Émile Spencer
- 1914: Y'a bon !, chanson soudanaise, music by Jardin
- 1914: La gavotte du sébasto, gavotte moderne, music by Antonin Jouberti
- 1917: Gaspard à Paris, revue d'un permissionnaire en 2 acts and 6 tableaux, with Henri Blondeau
- 1924: Moi, je n'aime pas ça !, chansonnette, music by Vincent Scotto
- 1924: Les Affaires sont les affaires, with Paul Diolot, music by Vincent Puget
- 1942: Ça plaît aux femmes, music by Alcib Mario
- 1942: En écoutant la garde, with Henri Muller, music by Charles Jardin
- 1942: J'ai retrouvé, music by Gaston Gabaroche
- 1942: Un soir à Bénarès, mélodie fox trot
- 1942: Papillon du soir, music by René de Buxeuil
