= Ernest Henri Demanne =

French comedian

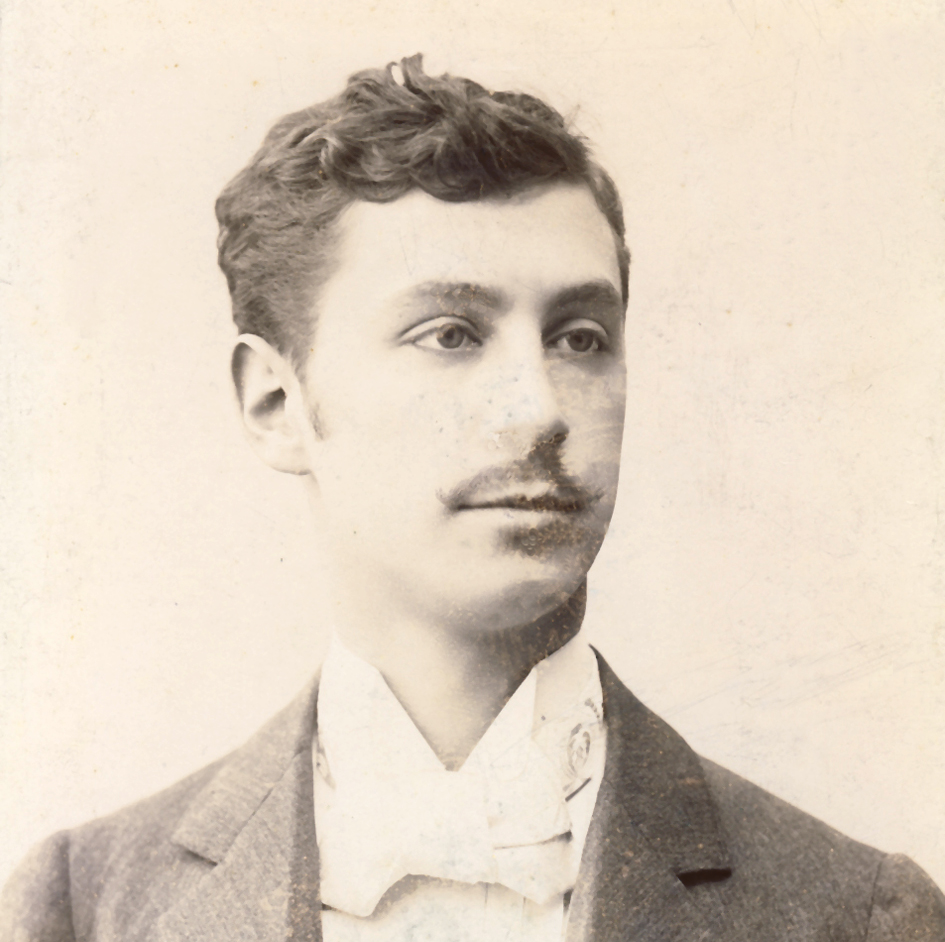
- Henri Ernest Demanne in 1894
- Born: 7 May 1870; Strasbourg
- Died: 22 March 1938 (aged 67); Paris
- Occupation: Actor
- Spouses: Marie-Antoinette Fabrège; Alice Serbrun (de); Gabrielle-Louise Hocquart

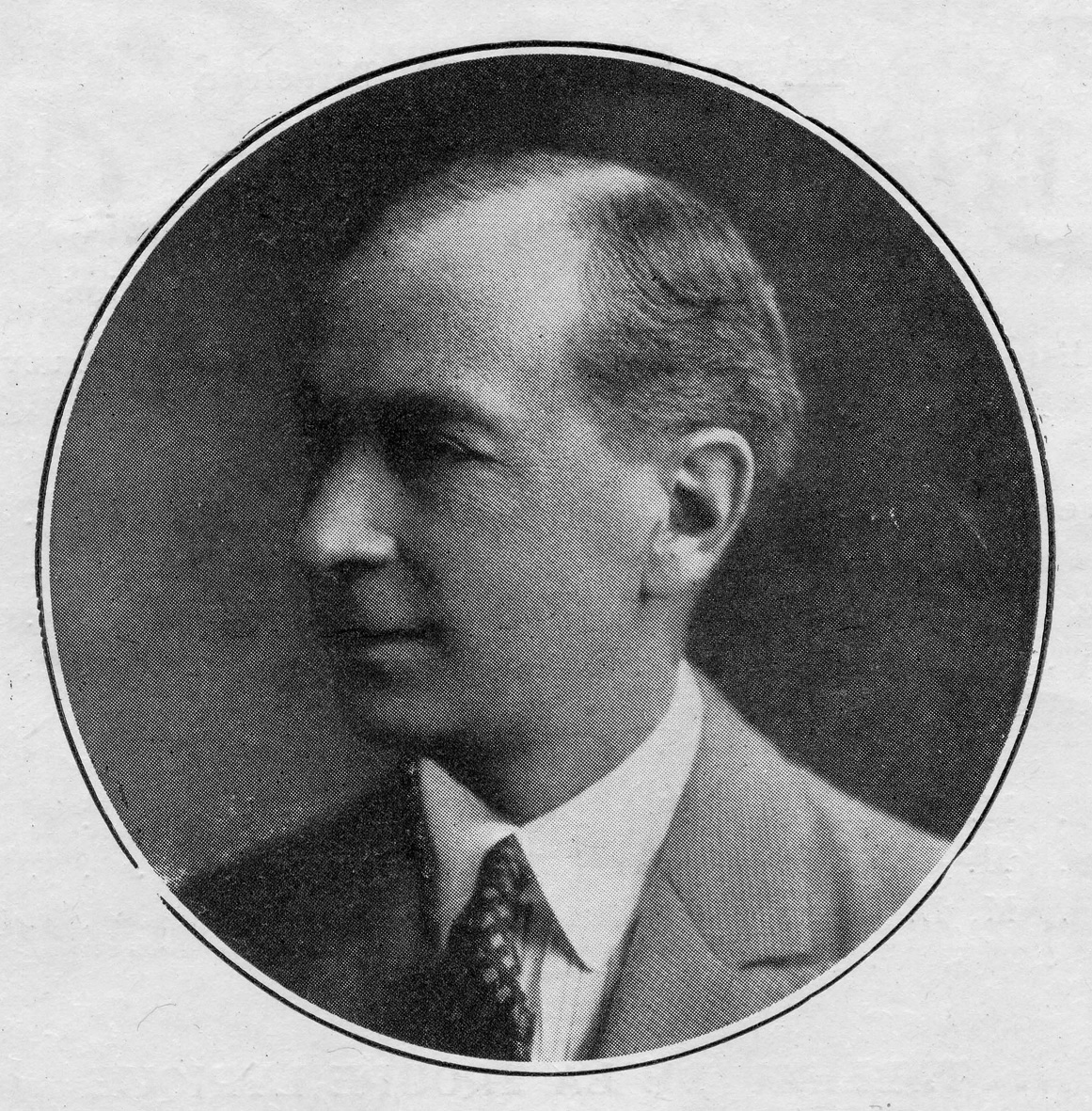
Henri Ernest Demanne in 1930, director of the Théâtre municipal of Metz

Ernest Henri Demanne (7 May 1870 – 22 March 1938) was a French comedian.

== Theatre ==
- 1891: Le monde ou l’on s’ennuie by Édouard Pailleron, Théâtre des Célestins
- 1891: le Duc de Ravinel by Louis Péricaud, Théâtre des Célestins
- 1891: L’Abbé Constantin adaptation by Pierre Decourcelle, Théâtre des Célestins
- 1891: Nos bons villageois by Victorien Sardou, Théâtre des Célestins
- 1891: Le petit Jacques by Jules Arsène Arnaud Claretie, Théâtre des Célestins
- 1892: la Joie fait peur by Émile de Girardin, Théâtre des Célestins
- 1892: le Prince d'Aurec by Henri Lavedan, au Théâtre des Arts de Bordeaux
- 1893: Un mariage au chocolat by Paul Berthelot, au Théâtre des Arts de Bordeaux
- 1894: Un fil à la patte by Georges Feydeau, au Grand Cercle d'Aix-les-Bains
- 1894: Le Système Ribadier by Georges Feydeau, au Grand Cercle d'Aix-les-Bains
- 1894: Le brigadier de Bombignac by Alexandre Bisson, au Casino Grand Cercle
- 1895: L'Ami des Femmes, by Alexandre Dumas, Théâtre royal du Parc à Bruxelles
- 1895: Faux bonshommes, by Etienne Carjat, Théâtre royal du Parc
- 1896: Numa Roumestan, by Alphonse Daudet, Théâtre royal du Parc
- 1896: Mademoiselle Eve, by Gyp, Théâtre royal du Parc
- 1896: Marcelle, by Victorien Sardou, Théâtre royal du Parc à Bruxelles
- 1896: L'Ami des Femmes, by Alexandre Dumas, Théâtre royal du Parc
- 1896: Froufrou, by Ludovic Halévy and Henri Meilhac, Théâtre royal du Parc
- 1896: Cabotins, by Édouard Pailleron, Théâtre royal du Parc à Bruxelles
- 1896: Les rois en exil, by Alphonse Daudet and Paul Delair, Théâtre royal du Parc à Bruxelles
- 1897: Monsieur Noir by Charles Dantin, Théâtre du Gymnase
- 1897: La jeunesse de Louis XIV by Alexandre Dumas, Théâtre du Gymnase
- 1898: Les Transatlantique by Abel Hermant, Théâtre du Gymnase
- 1898: Jalouse by Alexandre Bisson, Théâtre du Gymnase
- 1898: L'aînée by Jules Lemaître, Théâtre du Gymnase
- 1898: Pour l'honneurby Alexandre de Blaskovich, Théâtre du Gymnase
- 1898: L'Offense by Maurice Donnay, Théâtre du Vaudeville
- 1899: Le Lys rouge by Anatole France, Théâtre du Vaudeville
- 1899: Madame de Lavalette by Émile Moreau, Théâtre du Vaudeville
- 1899: Zaza by Pierre Berton and Charles Simon, Théâtre du Vaudeville
- 1899: La bonne hôtesse by Ambroise Janvier (1852–1905) and Marcel Ballot, Théâtre du Vaudeville
- 1899: Belle maman by Victorien Sardou and Raymond Deslandes, Théâtre du Vaudeville
- 1899: Rose d'automne by Auguste Dorchain, Théâtre du Vaudeville
- 1900: La robe rouge by Eugène Brieux, Théâtre du Vaudeville
- 1900: Georgette Lemeunier by Gustave Guiches, Théâtre du Vaudeville
- 1900: Madame Sans-Gêne by Victorien Sardou and Émile Moreau, Théâtre du Vaudeville
- 1900: Le fils de l'étrangère, by Desmirail, Théâtre du Gymnase
- 1900: La poigne by Jean Julien, Théâtre du Gymnase
- 1900: Le monsieur de chez Maxim by Alfred Delilia, Cercle de l'Union artistique
- 1901: Cyrano de Bergerac by Edmond Rostand, tournée en Autriche-Hongrie, Roumanie et Allemagne
- 1902: Ma fée by Pierre Veber and Maurice Soulié, direction Charles Baret, Khedivial Opera House, Cairo
- 1902: Main gauche by Pierre Veber, direction Charles Baret, Khedivial Opera House, Cairo
- 1902: Le marquis de Villemer by George Sand, direction Charles Baret, Zizinia Theatre, Alexandria
- 1902: Dormez je le veux by Georges Feydeau, direction Charles Baret, Zizinia Theatre, Alexandria
- 1903: La dame de chez Maxim by Georges Feydeau, avec la tournée Vast, Nouveau théâtre de Lyon
- 1903: Éducation de prince by Maurice Donnay, Nouveau théâtre de Lyon
- 1904: La bâillonnée by Pierre Decourcelle, Théâtre municipal des Célestins de Lyon
- 1904: La Caroline by Maurice Vaucaire and Félix Galipaux, Casino municipal de Nice
- 1904: Truc du Brélien by Paul Armont and Nicolas Nancey, Théâtre municipal des Célestins de Lyon
- 1904: Trois anabaptistes by Alexandre Bisson, Théâtre des Célestins
- 1904: Les cambrioleurs de Paris by Henri Kéroul, Théâtre des Célestins
- 1905: Une affaire scandaleuse by Maurice Ordonneau, Théâtre des Célestins
- 1905: Un héros by Edmond Fleg, Théâtre des Célestins
- 1905: L'Enfant du miracle by Paul Gavault and Robert Charvay, Casino d'Uriage
- 1908: L'Usurier by Thomas Corneille, Théâtre Michel
- 1912: Papa by Robert de Flers and Gaston Arman de Caillavet, Théâtre municipal de Strasbourg
- 1912: L’Assaut by Henry Bernstein, Tournée Baret at the Théâtre du Casino municipal de Trouville
- 1913: L’Idée de Françoise by Paul Gavault, Tournée Baret in Alsace (Mulhouse, Sainte-Marie-aux-Mines, Strasbourg and Colmar)
- 1913: Les Maris de Léontine by Alfred Capus, Tournée Baret in Alsace (Mulhouse, Sainte-Marie-aux-Mines, Strasbourg and Colmar)
- 1913: L’Anglais tel qu'on le parle by Tristan Bernard, Tournée Baret in Alsace (Mulhouse, Sainte-Marie-aux-Mines, Strasbourg nd Colmar)
- 1913: La Gamine by Pierre Veber, Tournée Baret in Alsace (Mulhouse, Sainte-Marie-aux-Mines, Strasbourg and Colmar)
- 1913: Le Grillon du foyer by Ludovic de Francmesnil, Tournée Baret in Alsace (Mulhouse, Sainte-Marie-aux-Mines, Strasbourg and Colmar)
- 1913: Asile de nuit by Max Maurey, Tournée Baret in Alsace (Mulhouse, Sainte-Marie-aux-Mines, Strasbourg and Colmar)
- 1920: Primerose by Robert de Flers and Gaston Arman de Caillavet, Tournée Baret at the Théâtre du Gymnase de Liège
- 1920: Le retour by Robert de Flers et Francis de Croisset, Tournée Baret at the Théâtre du Gymnase de Liège
- 1920: Et moi j'te dis qu'elle t'a fait de l'œil, by Maurice Hennequin, Tournée Baret at the Théâtre du Gymnase de Liège
- 1921: Chouchou, by Pierre Veber and Henry de Gorsse, Tournée Baret at the Théâtre d'Annecy
- 1923: la Danseuse éperdue, by René Fauchois, Tournée Baret at the Grand Casino de Berck-Plage
- 1926: Romance, by Robert de Flers and Francis de Croisset, Tournée Baret at the Casino of Arcachon beach
- 1927: Romance by Robert de Flers and Francis de Croisset, Tournée Baret at the Majestic in Lens
