= Henri Blondeau =

French playwright, librettist and chansonnier

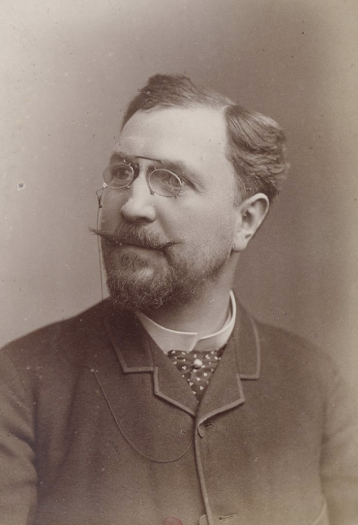
- Born: Henri Marie Gabriel Blondeau; 5 August 1841; Paris
- Died: 4 May 1925 (aged 83); Asnières-sur-Seine
- Occupations: Playwright, librettist, chansonnier

Henri Marie Gabriel Blondeau (5 August 1841 – 4 May 1925) was a French playwright, librettist and chansonnier, famous for his song Frou-frou.

== Biography ==
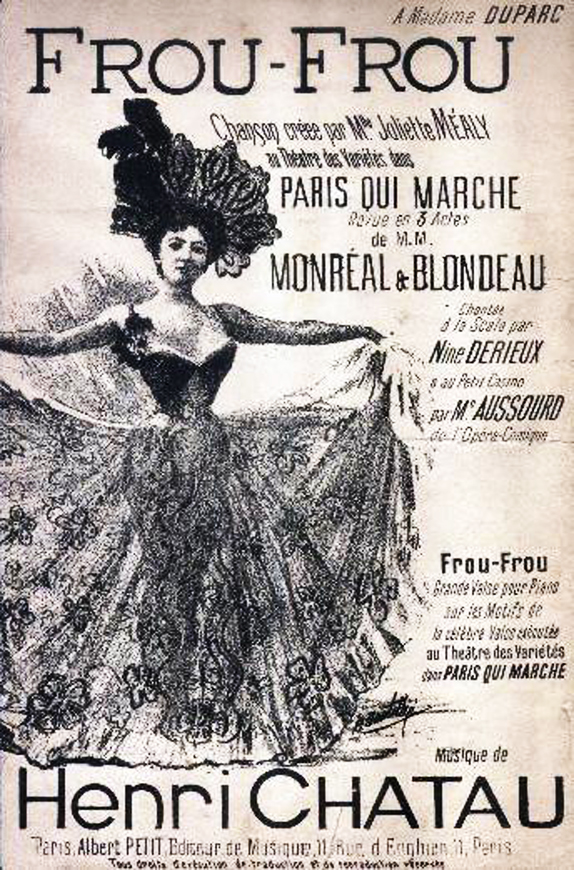

A clerk by a stockbroker, he became known in the early 1860s by his ditties in the cafés-concerts. With his friend Hector Monréal, they would collaborate during 40 years on the stages.

His plays were presented on the most significant Parisian stages of the 19th century including the Théâtre de l'Ambigu-Comique, Théâtre des Folies-Dramatiques, Théâtre des Variétés, Théâtre du Château d'Eau.

In 1870, during the Paris Commune, and in association with Monréal, he ran a satirical newspaper called the Fils du Père Duchêne illustré.

== Works ==
- Ah ! J'aime bien mieux ça !, chansonnette, music by Ernest Martin, 1863
- L'Embarras du choix !, chansonnette, music by Martin, 1863
- Victoire et félicité !, duo comique, music by Auguste Girin, 1863
- Avez-vous vu Lambert ?, scie parisienne, 1864
- Chacun a sa monomanie !, chansonnette, music by Henri Chulliot de Ploosen, 1864
- Comme on change en vieillissant !, chansonnette de genre, 1864
- Impossible de s'en passer !, chansonnette, music by Martin, 1864
- Locataire et portier !, duo comique, music by Martin, 1864
- La Belle Ziguezon, ronde historiette, lyrics and music by Blondeau and Monréal, 1865
- Mr de Richenerac basconnade, chansonnette, with Monréal, 1865
- Ça n'coûte que deux sous ! grrrrande revue du moment déroulée tous les soirs par Heudebert au Café-concert du boulevard du Temple, 1865
- Le Pion amoureux, pochade-parody, mingled with couplets, 1866
- Tapez-moi là-d'ssus !, revue in 4 acts and 8 tableaux, including 1 prologue, with Monréal, 1867
- Ah ! qu'c'est bête, ronde burlesque et populaire, music by Léopold Bougnol, 1868
- Les Hannetons de l'année, revue in 3 acts and 8 tableaux, including a prologue, with Monréal, 1868
- Dagobert et son vélocipède, opérette bouffe in 1 act, 1869
- V'là les bêtises qui recommencent, revue in 4 acts and 8 tableaux, with Monréal, 1869
- Qui veut voir la lune ?, revue fantaisie in 3 acts and 8 tableaux, with Monréal, 1871
- Paris dans l'eau, vaudeville aquatique in 4 acts, with Monréal, 1872
- Une poignée de bêtises, revue in 2 acts and 3 tableaux, with Monréal, 1872
- La Veuve Malbrough, operetta in 1 act, with Monréal, 1872
- La Nuit des noces de la Fille Angot, vaudeville in 1 act, with Monréal, 1873
- Les Pommes d'or, operetta féerie in 3 acts and 12 tableaux, with Chivot, Alfred Duru and Monréal, 1873
- La Comète à Paris, revue in 3 acts and 10 tableaux, with Hector Monréal, 1874
- Ah ! C'est donc toi Mme la Revue !, revue in 3 acts and 10 tableaux, with Monréal, 1874
- Pif-Paf, féerie in 5 acts, including 1 prologue and 20 tableaux, with Clairville and Monréal, 1875
- La Revue à la vapeur, actualité parisienne in 1 act and 3 tableaux, with Paul Siraudin, Charles Blondelet and Monréal, 1875
- L'Ami Fritz-Poulet, parodie à la fourchette, mêlée de chansons à boire et à manger, en deux services, deux entremets et un dessert, with Monréal, 1876
- A treize ! tout à treize !, chansonnette, 1876
- Les Environs de Paris, voyage d'agrément in 4 acts and 8 tableaux, with Monréal, 1877
- Un Hanneton dans la coupole, fantaisie Charentonesque, music by Marc Chautagne, 1877
- Le Pays des chimères. Dalloz, song, music by Chautagne, 1877
- Une Nuit de noces, folie-vaudeville in 1 act, with Monréal, 1883
- Carnot, military drame in 5 acts and 8 tableaux, with Léon Jonathan, 1884
- Au Clair de la lune, revue in 4 acts and 8 tableaux, with Monréal and Georges Grisier, 1884
- Pêle-mêle gazette, revue in 4 acts and 7 tableaux, with Grisier et Monréal, 1885
- La Serinette de Jeannot, vaudeville in 1 act, with Monréal, 1885
- Les Terreurs de Jarnicoton, vaudeville-pantomime in 1 act, with Monréal, 1885
- Les Victimes du devoir !, chanson dramatique, music by Félicien Vargues, 1885
- Paris en général, revue in 4 acts and 10 tableaux, with Grisier and Monréal, 1886
- Mam'zelle Clochette, vaudeville in 1 act, with Monréal, 1887
- La Petite Francillon, little parody in 1 small prologue, 3 small acts and 2 short intermissions, with Alphonse Lemonnier and Monréal, 1887
- Paris-cancans, revue in 3 acts and 8 tableaux, with Monréal, 1888
- Paris Exposition, revue in 3 acts, 9 tableaux, with Monréal, 1889
- Paris-boulevard, revue in 3 acts, 8 tableaux, with Monréal, 1889
- Paris port de mer, revue in 3 acts, 7 tableaux, with Monréal, 1891
- Les Variétés de l'année, revue in 3 acts and 9 tableaux, with Monréal, 1892
- Les Bicyclistes en voyage, play in 3 acts and 7 tableaux, with Henri Chivot, 1893
- Les Rouengaines de l'année, revue in 3 acts, 7 tableaux including a prologue, with Monréal, 1893
- Tout Paris en revue, revue in 3 acts and 3 tableaux, with Monréal, 1894
- La Revue sans gêne, revue in 3 acts, 9 tableaux, with Monréal and Alfred Delilia, 1894
- Vive Robinson !, duo, with Monréal and Delilia, music by Lucien Collin, 1894
- Une semaine à Paris, revue in 3 acts, 11 tableaux, with Monréal, 1896
- Paris qui marche, revue in 3 acts, 10 tableaux, with Monréal, 1897
- Paris sur scène, revue in 3 acts, 8 tableaux, with Monréal, 1897
- Folies-Revue, revue in 3 acts, 9 tableaux, with Monréal, 1898
- Frou-frou, song, with Monréal, 1898
- Madame Méphisto, extravaganza play, in 2 acts and 5 tableaux, with Monréal, 1900
- Paris-joujoux, revue in 2 acts and 6 tableaux, with Monréal, 1901
- Olympia-Revue, in 4 tableaux, with Monréal, 1903
- On demande une étoile, scènes de la vie de théâtre, with Monréal, 1904
- Le Paradis de Mahomet, operetta in 3 acts, music by Robert Planquette, 1906
- Guignol s'en va-t-en guerre, pochade in 3 tableaux and one prologue, with Victor Buteaux, 1915
- Gaspard à Paris, revue d'un permissionnaire in 2 acts and 6 tableaux, with René Pourrière, 1917
- Monsieur Bouchenlarge, fantaisie, undated
- Pour les distraire, dittie, undated

== Bibliography ==
- Pierre Larousse, Nouveau Larousse illustré, supplément 1898 et 1906, (p. 81)
- Jean Bergeaud, Je choisis ... mon théâtre: Encyclopédie du théâtre, 1956, (p. 104)
