= Alphonse Lemonnier =

French journalist, novelist, chansonnier and playwright

- Born: Hippolyte Alphonse Lemonnier; 20 August 1842; Paris, France
- Died: 16 July 1907 (aged 64); Brussels, Belgium
- Occupations: Journalist, novelist, chansonnier, playwright

Alphonse Lemonnier, full name Hippolyte Alphonse Lemonnier, (20 August 1842 – 16 July 1907) was a 19th-century French journalist, novelist, chansonnier and playwright.

== Biography ==
Lemonnier was born in Paris, 6me arrondissement.

He made his comedian debut at the Cirque-Olympique before he became theatrical columnist for many newspapers. The founder of the Moniteur des théâtres et des plaisirs (1869), the Parisien illustré (1867) and La Vie thermale (1867), he was the publication director of the Paris-mondain (1880–1881) and Colombine (1894–1895) periodics.

Stage manager of the Théâtre des Variétés, then successively director of the Théâtre des Délassements-Comiques, the Théâtre du Château-d'eau and the Théâtre Déjazet, he later was managing director of the Alhambra and the Comédie-Mondaine (1906) in Brussels.

His plays were presented on the most important Parisian stages of his time, including the Théâtre Déjazet, the Théâtre de la Gaîté and the Théâtre des Folies-Dramatiques.

He died in Brussels, 16 July 1907, and was buried in the Paris Batignoles cemetery on 20 July 1907.

== Works ==
- 1856: Deux vieilles gardes, operetta in 1 act, with Ferdinand de Villeneuve and Léo Delibes
- 1860: Adieu charmants démons !, ditty
- 1861: La Fête de ma femme, comedy mingled with couplets, in 1 act
- 1862: Risette et Jacquot, ou les Étrennes au village, pièce villageoise in 1 act
- 1865: Les Femmes de théâtre
- 1865: Les Petites comédies de l'amour, one-act play, mingled with singing, with Félix Dutertre de Véteuil
- 1866: Les Aventures de Rockambolle, folie-vaudeville in 3 acts
- 1866: L'Affaire Clément-sot, mémoires d'une accusée, one-act play, with Victor Duteuil
- 1866: La Déesse du bœuf gras, folie carnavalesque in 2 tableaux, with Élie Frébault
- 1866: La Diva Peripata !, folie-vaudeville in 1 act, with Duteuil
- 1866: Faut nous payer ça, grande revue parisienne in 4 acts and 12 tableaux, with Duteuil
- 1868: Tout Paris la verra, revue in 5 acts and 15 tableaux, with François Oswald
- 1869: Allons-y, revue in 4 acts and 17 tableaux
- 1869: Concert de l'Eldorado... Petite biographie de Madame Judic
- 1869: Le Bien d'autrui, opéra comique in 1 act, music by Samuel David
- 1869: Le Gaulois-Revue, revue of 1868 in 4 acts and 10 tableaux, with Alexandre Flan
- 1871: Histoire de la révolution de Paris, avec notices biographiques des membres de la Commune
- 1871: Une Noce en visite, parody of Une visite de noces, in 1 act
- 1872: Les Femmes qui font des scènes, three-act play, mingled with song, with Monselet
- 1873: Les Femmes qui s'amusent
- 1873: Aimer un homme !, ditty
- 1876: Quand il n'y a plus de foin..., one-act play
- 1877: Les Femmes des réservistes, duo comique
- 1878: S. G. D. G., revue of the year
- 1880: Les Dindons de la farce, comedy in 3 acts 1878, with Charles Monselet
- 1880: Paris-mondain, ronde chantée tous les soirs, par Mme Dufresny, à l'Alcazar d'hiver, with de Jallais
- 1882: Cinq filles à marier, play mingled with song, in 1 act
- 1884: Une date immortelle ! souvenir d'un grand jour, with Amédée de Jallais
- 1885: Une Maîtresse servante, comédie-vaudeville in 1 act, with Henri Luguet
- 1886: L'Année scandaleuse, revue of the year in 2 acts and 1 prologue, with Stéphen Lemonnier
- 1887: La Petite Francillon, little parody in 1 little prologue, 3 little acts and 2 little intermissions, with Henri Blondeau and Hector Monréal
- 1891: Madame la maréchale, three-act play, with Louis Péricaud
- 1891: Une mère d'actrice, novel, with S. Lemonnier
- 1892: L'Héritage de Jean Gommier, five-act play, with Louis Péricaud
- 1895: Les abus du théâtre; Quelques directeurs en robe de chambre
- 1897: Paille d'avoine, opéra comique in 1 act
- 1899: Françoise les Bas-Bleus, pièce patriotique mêlée de chant, in 3 tableaux, with S. Lemonnier
- 1899: Fidelio, opera in 3 acts
- 1901: Le Premier modèle, comedy in 1 act
- 1902: Les Mille et un souvenirs d'un homme de théâtre
- undate: Huit ans au théâtre de la République

== Bibliography ==
- Le Théâtre, revue, vol.10, partie 2, 1907, (p. 88) (obituary)
- Le Ménestrel: journal de musique, 1907, (p. 232) (obituary)
- Henry Lyonnet, Dictionnaire des comédiens français, 1911, (p. 190)
- Guy Dumur, Histoire des spectacles, 1965, (p. 1867)
