= Antoine Banès =

French composer

- Born: Antoine Anatole; 8 June 1856; Paris
- Died: 9 January 1924 (aged 67); Neuilly-sur-Seine
- Occupation: Composer

Antoine Banés, real name Antoine Anatole, (8 June 1856 – 9 January 1924) was a French composer of operettas and ballets.

== Biography ==
Antoine Banes studied music under the direction of Émile Durand, professor of harmony at the Paris Conservatoire. Early on, he thought to appear in the theater. He enjoyed light music and represented various successful comic operas or operettas. After trying his hand in various musical pochades at the Eldorado, he represented works including, among others, la Nuit de noce (1881); les Délégués (1887); Toto (1892)...

== Main works ==
=== Operas and operettas ===
- 1881: La Nuit de noce
- 1883: La Cadiguette, operetta in 1 act, libretto by Louis Péricaud and Lemoine (Eldoradp)
- 1884: L'Escargot, operetta in 1 act, libretto by Albert Barré and Paul Adely (Eldorado, 19 April)
- 1885: Les Délégués, vaudeville-operetta in 3 acts, libretto by Fabrice Carré and Émile Blavet (Théâtre des Nouveautés, 28 November)
- 1892: Toto, operetta in 3 acts, libretto by Albert Barré and Paul Bilhaud (Théâtre des Menus-Plaisirs, 10 June)
- 1893: Madame Rose, opéra comique in 1 act, libretto by Albert Barré and Paul Bilhaud (Opéra-Comique, 25 September)
- 1894: Le Bonhomme de neige, operetta in 3 acts, libretto by Albert Vanloo and Henri Chivot (Théâtre des Bouffes-Parisiens, 19 April)
- 1895: Le Roi Frelon, operetta in 3 acts, libretto by Albert Barré and Paul Bilhaud (Théâtre des Folies-Dramatiques, 11 April)
- 1896: Nuit d'amour, fantaisie lyrique in 3 acts and 4 tableaux, libretto by Albert Barré and Maxime Boucheron (Bouffes-Parisiens, 11 May)
- 1897: Le Nouveau Régiment, operetta in 2 acts, libretto by Albert Barré, Edmond Martin and Henry Berhard (Olympia, 12 March)
- 1897: La Jarretière, operetta in 1 act, libretto by Albert Barré and Paul Bilhaud (Eldorado, 29 April)
- 1899: La Pomme d'Adam, opéra comique in 1 acts, libretto by Lucien Augé de Lassus (Casino de Trouville, 25 August)
- 1901: Mlle portez-arme!.., operetta in 3 acts, libretto by Albert Barré, Edmond Martin and Henry Berhard
- La Sœur de Jocrisse, opéra comique in 1 act, libretto by Albert Vanloo
- Léda, opéra bouffe in 3 acts, libretto by Pierre Veber and Lucien Augé de Lassus, published by Enoch in 1909
- Les Gabelous, opéra bouffe in 3 acts, libretto by Albert Barré, non performed, but published by Enoch in 1909
- Monsieur sans façons, operetta in 3 acts, libretto by Maxime Boucheron and Albert Barré, non performed

=== Ballets ===
- Tohu-Bohu, ballet (Folies-Bergère)
- Olympia, ballet-prologue in 1 act and 2 tableaux, libretto by Alfred Delilia, réglé by G. Pastorini (Olympia, 11 April 1893)
- Mademoiselle Cyclamen, ballet (1904)
- Le Péage, ballet-pantomime in 1 act, script by Georges de Dubor (1905)
