= Alhambra-Maurice Chevalier =

Former theatre in Paris, France (1866–1967)

- Cirque-Impérial (1866-67); Théâtre du Prince Impérial (1867-69); Théâtre du Château-d'Eau (1869-83/1900-1903); Opéra-Populaire (1883-93/1899); Théâtre de la République (1893-99); Théâtre du peuple et de la République (1936)
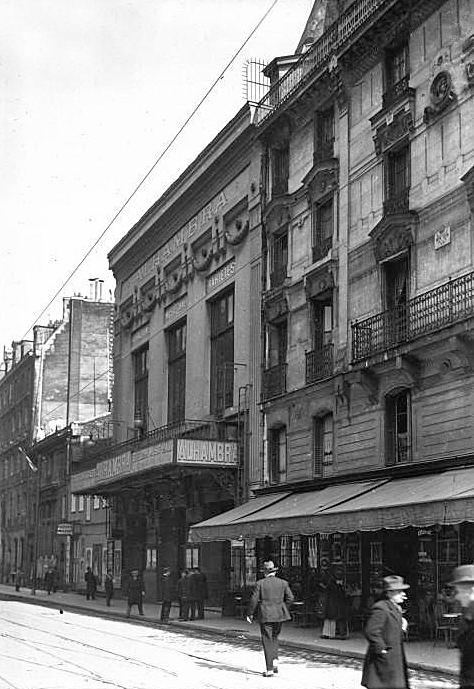
- Interactive map of Alhambra-Maurice Chevalier
- Address: 50, rue de Malte; Paris; France
- Coordinates: 48.8671°N 2.3667°E
- Capacity: 2500
- Type: Music hall

Construction
- Opened: August 11, 1866
- Closed: 1967
- Architect: G. Guimpel

The Alhambra-Maurice Chevalier was a music hall located at 50, rue de Malte in the 11th arrondissement of Paris. It opened on August 11, 1866, and after a long history, and many name changes, was finally demolished in 1967. When the theatre originally opened, it was actually called the Cirque-Impérial—it was only in 1956 that Jane Breteau renamed it Alhambra-Maurice Chevalier, in honor of the beloved French actor and singer.

A new Alhambra opened in 2008. This is 300 meters from the site of the old Alhambra-Maurice Chevalier.
