= David James (actor, born 1839) =

English comic actor

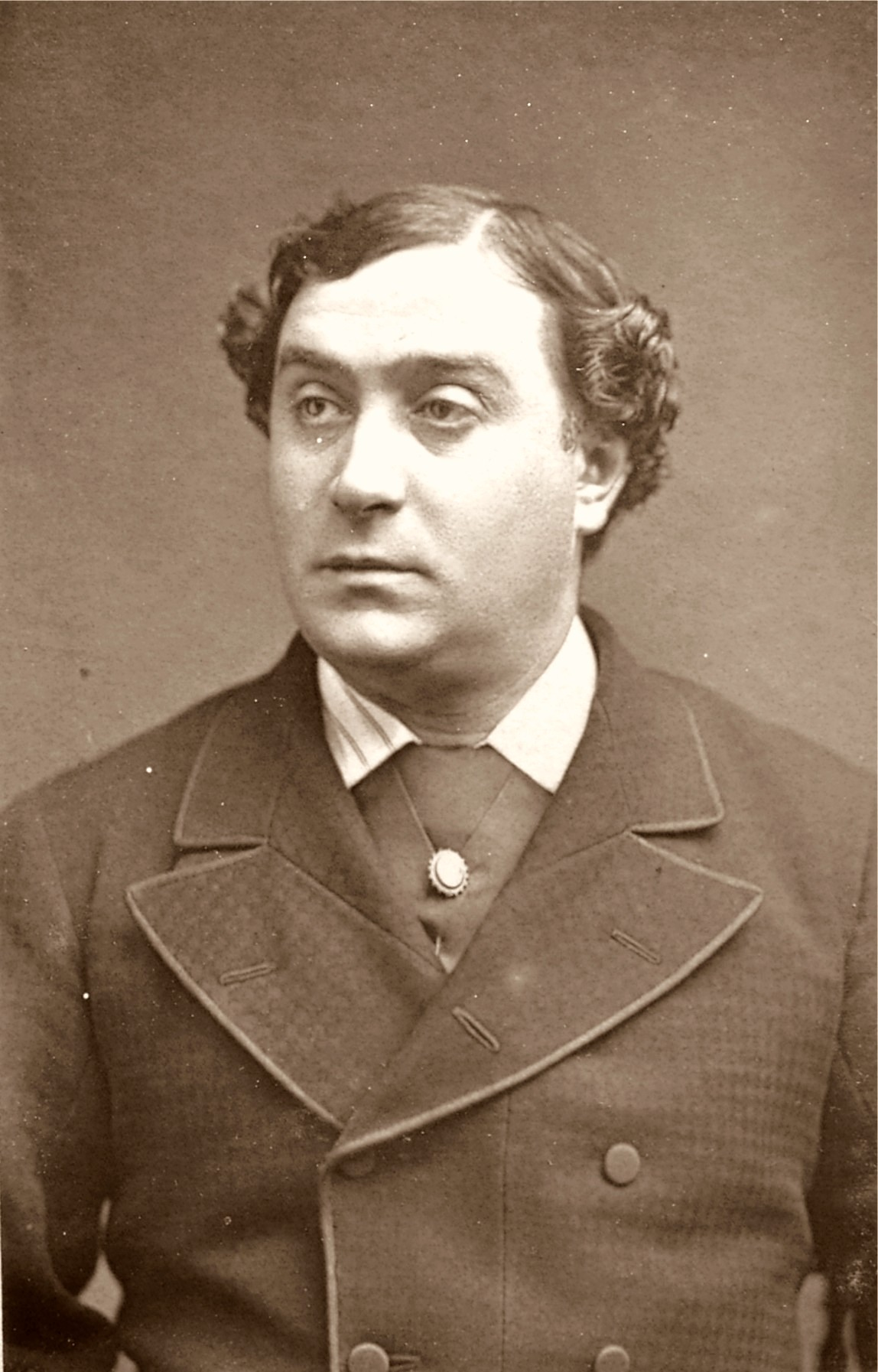
David James

David James (born David Belasco; 25 January 1835 - 2 October 1893) was an English comic actor and one of the founders of London's Vaudeville Theatre. He made his stage debut as a child actor at the Princess's Theatre, London under Charles Kean, and appeared in supporting roles at, successively, the Royalty Theatre, where he made his mark in burlesques by F. C. Burnand and others, and then the Strand Theatre, still mainly in burlesque roles but also making an impression as a more serious actor in a revival of Thomas Morton's The Heir at Law.

In 1870 James joined Henry James Montague and Thomas Thorne as the first managers of the newly opened Vaudeville Theatre, where he played mainly in new burlesques and farces but also appeared as Sir Benjamin Backbite in The School for Scandal, a production that ran for more than 400 performances. His most celebrated role was Perkyn Middlewick in H. J. Byron's comedy Our Boys, which ran at the Vaudeville for 1,362 performances. Leaving the Vaudeville in 1881, James freelanced for other managements for most of the rest of his career. One of his best-known parts from this period was the bluff sailor John Dory in John O'Keefe's Wild Oats at the Criterion Theatre in 1886. He also appeared in operetta as the Rev Dr Jackson in Miss Decima.

James died at his London home at the age of 56, leaving to charity a fortune of well over £5m in current terms.

== Life and career ==
=== Early years ===
David Abraham Belasco aka David James was born in Eagle Court, Covent Garden, London, to a family of Sephardic Jewish origin. His father, Abraham Julian Belasco was born in Gibralter, his mother was Hagar Joseph Belasco. He had a son David O'Hara in 1857 by his common law wife Mary Ann O'Hara but was to marry Ameleia ((Leah) Portlock in 1866 who converted to Judaism.

James made his stage debut as a child actor at the Princess's Theatre, London, then managed by Charles Kean.

James joined the company at the Royalty Theatre towards the end of 1861, playing a range of minor roles before making his first great success, in September 1863, as Mercury in F. C. Burnand's Ixion, or The Man at the Wheel, in the words of The Stage "appearing to much advantage as a singer and dancer in a small part". From the Royalty he moved in December 1863 to the company of the Strand Theatre, where he remained until 1870. Among his successful roles there were Tom Foxer in H. T. Craven's One Tree Hill (1865), two more Burnand roles: Will Somers, the jester, in Windsor Castle and Neluska in L'Africaine (both 1865), Francis in William Brough's The Field of the Cloth of Gold (1868) and Zekiel Homespun in a revival of Thomas Morton's The Heir at Law. The Stage said of his performance in the last of these that it "revealed new capacities in the successful burlesque actor, showing a pathos and a truth to nature such as lifted the part out of the conventional category into which it had long fallen".

=== Actor-manager ===
In 1870 James joined Henry James Montague and Thomas Thorne as the first managers of the newly opened Vaudeville Theatre. James was unavailable to act in their first productions and in James Albery's comedy Two Roses, the role of Mr Jenkins, with which he was later closely associated, was played by George Honey. One of James's early successes at the Vaudeville was in the one-act farce Chiselling in which, according to the theatrical newspaper The Era, "as the model posing as the statue he for many, many nights kept the Vaudeville patrons in roars of laughter".

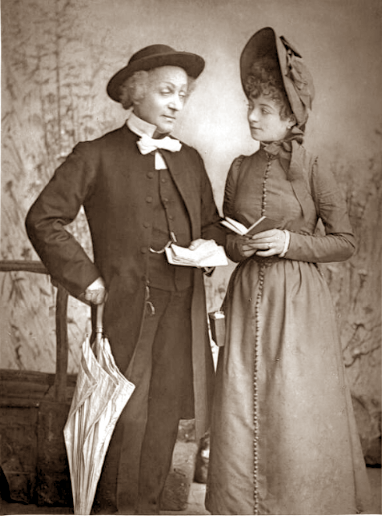
James with Juliette Nesville in Miss Decima, 1891

During his time at the Vaudeville, James played with success Bob Trout in Albery's Apple Blossoms, Sir Benjamin Backbite in The School for Scandal (a production that ran for more than 400 performances), Goldfinch, in The Road to Ruin, John Tweedie in Tweedie's Rights, Sir Ball Brace, in Albery's Pride, and – his most celebrated role – Perkyn Middlewick, in H. J. Byron's comedy Our Boys, which ran at the Vaudeville from 16 January 1875 for 1,362 performances. The Daily Telegraph commented:

The artistic impulse of Mr David James is so keen that it refuses to be fettered. ... Clever lines were never more admirably spoken, and caricature seldom conveyed with less exaggeration. ... One more character has been added to the list of successes achieved by Mr David James.

=== Later years ===
Montague had left the Vaudeville in 1871, and James and Thorne continued for a further ten years before dissolving the partnership. James left the Vaudeville Theatre in 1881 and freelanced for other managements for most of the rest of his career. He joined the Bancrofts at the Haymarket Theatre in 1881, playing Lovibond in Tom Taylor's The Overland Route and Eccles in T. W. Robertson's comedy Caste in a role first played by George Honey. In 1885 he briefly returned to management at the Opera Comique, where he appeared as Blueskin in Little Jack Sheppard and Aristides Cassegrain in The Excursion Train. In 1886 he moved to the Criterion playing one of his most successful parts, the bluff sailor John Dory in John O'Keefe's Wild Oats. Other notable roles included the City merchant Ingot in David and the Rev Dr Jackson in Miss Decima. Shortly before James's death in 1893, Henry Irving revived Our Boys for him.

James died at his house in St John's Wood, London on 2 October 1893 at the age of 56. He left a fortune of £41,594 (well over £5m in current terms). His widow received a substantial annual income and the residuary estate was left to charity. His son, David James Jr., continued the family tradition and became an actor.

== Sources ==
- Carson, Lionel, ed. (1908). The Stage Year Book. London: Carson & Comerford. OCLC 1376723700.
- Gaye, Freda, ed. (1967). Who's Who in the Theatre (fourteenth ed.). London: Sir Isaac Pitman and Sons. OCLC 5997224.
- Pascoe, Charles (1879). The Dramatic List. London: Hardwicke and Bogue. OCLC 4283917.
