= René de Buxeuil =

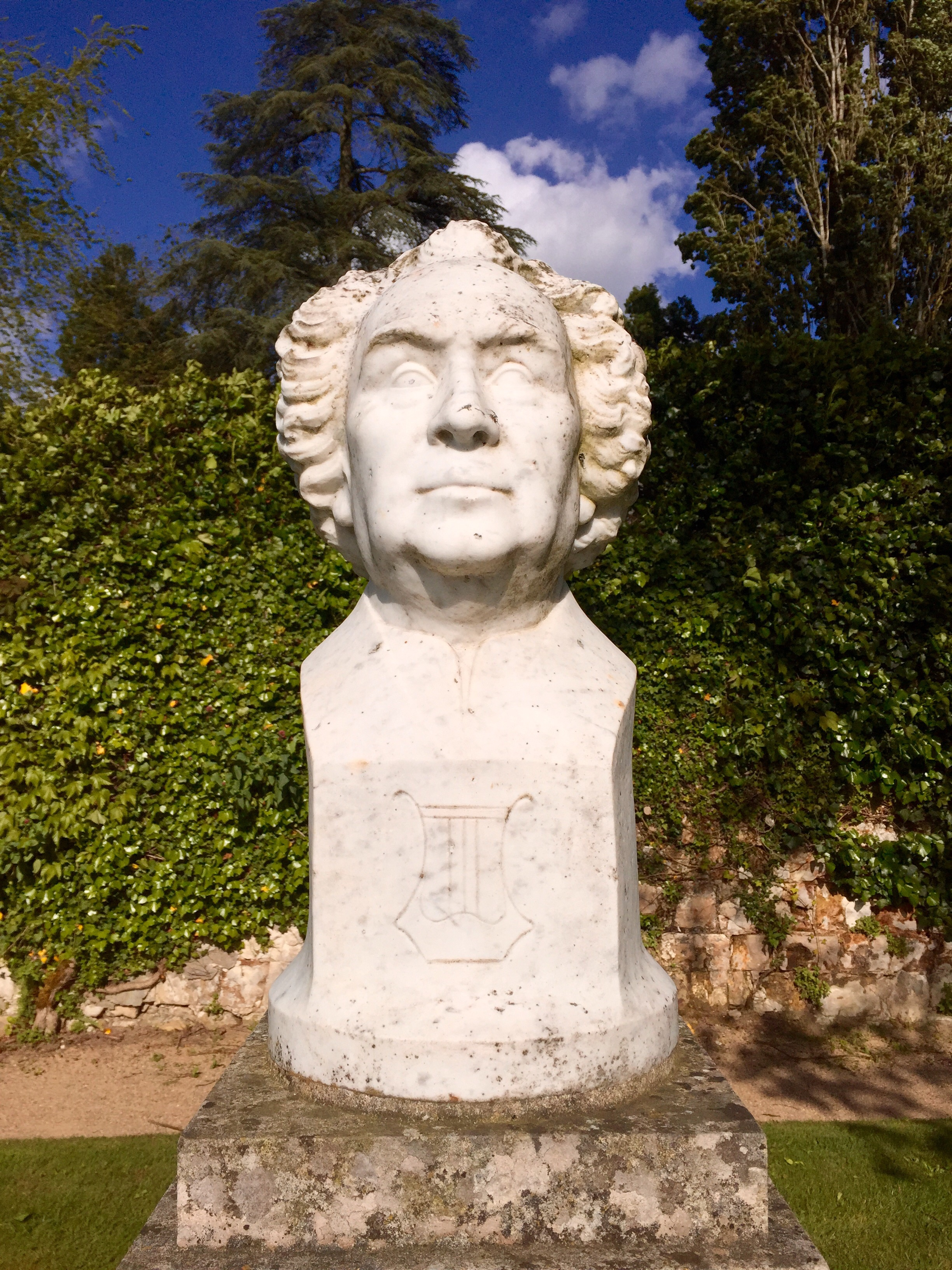
- Buxeuil's bust at Père Lachaise cemetery
- Born: Jean-Baptiste Chevrier; 4 June 1881; Buxeuil (Vienne department)
- Died: 29 June 1959 (aged 78); Paris
- Occupation(s): Composer; Chansonnier; Music publisher

René de Buxeuil (French pronunciation: [ʁəne də byksœj]), pseudonym for Jean-Baptiste Chevrier (French pronunciation: [ʒɑ̃ batist ʃəvʁije]; 4 June 1881 – 29 July 1959), was a 20th-century French composer and chansonnier.

== Biography ==
De Buxeuil's parents ran the bistro Les prévoyants de l'avenir in La Haye-Descartes. In 1892 a comrade accidentally shot a pellet rifle. He received the discharge in the eye. Blinded, he was placed in the Institut National des Jeunes Aveugles in Paris, where he was taught music. He won first prize for harmony, piano and clarinet. He began writing songs which he played for school holidays or in the cafe of his parents.

A young man, De Buxeuil attended le Bijou-Concert and met Montmartre chansonniers Xavier Privas, Paul Delmet and Eugène Lemercier. He wrote several songs related to current events and politicians, then he discovered the café-concerts. He performed there and met his first interpreters. To make a living, he accompanied silent films on the piano and gave singing lessons. One of his students would experience fame c. 1909 under the name Damia.

Before World War I, he attended the Montparnasse area. At Théâtre de la Gaîté, he met Georgel who sang him some tunes. He also sang at Gabriel Montoya in Montmartre and founded Les Loups, a literary society where Jehan Rictus rubbed shoulders with Gaston Couté, Steinlen, Émile Verhaeren or Willette. He signed his first successes interpreted by Junka, including L'âme des violons, Ferme tes jolis yeux, etc.

During the war, he organized a theater for the Army and moved to sing on the front. After the war, he wrote L'âme des roses for the singer Berthe Sylva.

In 1924, he hired the then 14-year old Jean Genet who caused him thousand miseries. While the latter squandered the money of commissions, De Buxeuil filed a complaint. Genet was trapped in the Mettray Penal Colony for a year. The poet reported this terrible experience in Le journal d'un voleur.

De Buxeuil then managed his own musical editions.

A member of the Action française, de Buxeuil authored the music of its hymn La Royale and numerous other royalist songs. In 1938, he wrote Ô mon Morvan for Maryse Martin (1906–1984).

He is buried in Paris at Père Lachaise Cemetery (1st division). He had chosen his pseudonym as much to honor his birthplace (Buxeuil, lieu-dit Plancoulaine, close to Descartes), as to be the third renowned René (after René Descartes and René Boylesve) from the region of Descartes, commune of Touraine.

== Songs (selection) ==
- 1938, Ô mon Morvan
- J'ai tout donné pour toi - lyrics by A. Waseige. music by René de Buxeuil
- Quand tout sera fini - sung by René de Buxeuil
- Ouvre tes jolis yeux - Lyrics by Nikola, music by René de Buxeuil
- 1910–1920 - Son Amoureux - Lyrics by P. Alberty, music by René de Buxeuil (Ed. Delormel)

== Bibliography ==
- René de Buxeuil, Un demi-siècle en chantant, 1955, (self published)
