= Michel Bordet =

19th century French playwright and actor

Michel Étienne Bordet (? – Paris, 17 March 1892) was a 19th-century French playwright, actor and chansonnier.

An actor at the Théâtre de Belleville, on 1 February 1858 he established the review Paris chanté. Journal artistique, littéraire, poétique et de chansons commerciales which would be published until April.

Stage manager of the théâtre de l'Ambigu-Comique from 1846, his plays were presented, among other, at the Théâtre Beaumarchais and the Théâtre-Lyrique.

== Works ==
- 1858: La-i-tou et tralala, folie-vaudeville in 1 act, with Charles Blondelet
- 1859: Ah ! Il a des bottes, Bastien !, comédie en vaudeville in 1 act, with Blondelet
- 1859: Le Passé et l'avenir (rondeaux), à-propos in 1 act
- 1860: France, Nice et Savoie, cantata
- 1860: Les Femmes, rondeau
- 1861: La Lisette du chansonnier, two-act play, mingled with singing, with Béranger
- 1863: À tous les diables, revue vaudeville in 2 acts and 2 tableaux, with J. Deschamps
- 1864: Encore une pilule, review, with Paul Faulquemont
- 1864: La Vendange, hymne à la vigne
- 1866: Je serai laboureur, one act play, mingled with singing
- 1872: Aux Enfants de Belleville, cantata
- 1872: Je suis Bellevillois, protestation
- 1874: A la chaudière !, review of the year 1874, with Georges Cavalier
- 1875: A l'amigo !, review of the year 1875 in 5 acts and 7 tableaux
- 1880: V'là Belleville qui passe, review in 2 acts
- 1883: Les Compagnons de l'avenir, drama in 5 acts
- undated: Les Victoires de la paix, cantata

== Bibliography ==
- Louis Péricaud, Le Théâtre des Funambules : ses mimes, ses acteurs, et ses pantomimes depuis sa fondation, jusqu'à sa démolition, 1897, p. 434
- Henry Lyonnet, Dictionnaire des comédiens français, vol. 1, 1911
