= Miss Helyett (1933 film) =

1933 film

- Directed by: Hubert Bourlon; Jean Kemm
- Written by: Maxime Boucheron (operetta); Hubert Bourlon; Pierre Maudru
- Starring: Josette Day; Jim Gérald; Roger Bourdin
- Cinematography: Georges Asselin; Maurice Barry; Raymond Clunie; Marcel Lucien
- Edited by: Henriette Wurtzer
- Music by: Jacques Belasco
- Production company: Les Productions Cinématographiques
- Release date: 1933
- Running time: Société des Films Vega
- Country: France
- Language: French

Miss Helyett is a 1933 French comedy film directed by Hubert Bourlon and Jean Kemm and starring Josette Day, Jim Gérald and Roger Bourdin. It is based on Miss Helyett an 1891 opérette by Edmond Audran and Maxime Boucheron. A previous silent film adaptation was released in 1928. The film's sets were designed by the art director Jean d'Eaubonne.

== Cast ==
- Josette Day as Miss Helyett
- Jim Gérald as Le professeur Smithson
- Roger Bourdin as Paul Landrin
- Germaine Reuver as La señora
- Fred Pasquali as Puycardas
- Turgot as Un ami
- Renée Devilder as Norette
- Simone Mareuil as Lolotte
- Janette Julia as Toto
- Dan Etche as Alonza
- Anne-Marie Leducq as Lisette
- Anita Palacine as Jeannette
- Robert Lepers as James
- Robert Pizani as Bacarel
- Renée Piat

== Bibliography ==
- Goble, Alan. The Complete Index to Literary Sources in Film. Walter de Gruyter, 1999.
