= Charles Blondelet =

French actor, playwright and chansonnier

- Born: Désiré Jacques François Blondelet; 4 November 1820; Paris
- Died: 2 December 1888 (aged 68); Courbevoie
- Occupations: Actor, playwright, chansonnier

Charles Blondelet, full name Désiré Jacques François Blondelet, (4 November 1820 – 2 December 1888) was a 19th-century French actor, playwright and chansonnier. He performed at the Théâtre des Variétés from 1858 to 1888.

== Works ==
- 1858: La-i-tou et Tralala in collaboration with Michel Bordet, folie-vaudeville in 1 act; Dechaume
- 1859: Ah, il a des bottes, Bastien, vaudeville in 1 act; Librairie Théâtrale
- 1859: Le diable au corps, féérie-vaudeville in 1 act; Librairie Théâtrale
- 1868: Le beau Paris, in collaboration with Félix Baumaine, saynete-bouffe set in music by Léon Roques; Egrot
- 1868: Deux auteurs incompris, opérette bouffe in 1 act set in music by Félix Jouffroy; Librairie Théâtrale
- 1879: L'assommoir procédé d'une conférence sur l'Assommoir, ambiguë parodie in 1 act in collaboration with Félix Baumaine; Le Bailly
- 1883: Les Rois s'amusent, ou les Deux Henriot, operetta in 1 act set in music by Édouard Deransart; Feuchot

== Theatre ==
- 1860: Oh ! là là ! qu' c'est bête tout ça ! de Clairville and Théodore Cogniard, Théâtre des Variétés
- 1861: L'Amour en sabots by Eugène Labiche and Alfred Delacour, Théâtre des Variétés
- 1865: L'Homme qui manque le coche by Eugène Labiche and Alfred Delacour, Théâtre des Variétés
- 1869: Le Mot de la fin by Clairville and Paul Siraudin, Théâtre des Variétés
- 1870: Le Ver rongeur by Jules Moinaux and Henry Bocage, Théâtre des Variétés
- 1873: Les Merveilleuses by Victorien Sardou, Théâtre des Variétés
- 1875: La Revue à la vapeur by Paul Siraudin, Henri Blondeau and Hector Monréal, Théâtre des Variétés
- 1875: Les Trois Épiciers by Joseph-Philippe Lockroy and Anicet Bourgeois, Théâtre des Variétés
- 1875: Les Bêtises d'hier by Clairville, Hippolyte Cogniard and Paul Siraudin, Théâtre des Variétés
- 1876: Le roi dort by Eugène Labiche and Alfred Delacour, Théâtre des Variétés

== Sources ==
- Angelo de Gubernatis : Dictionnaire international des écrivains du jour (page 339) 1888-1891
