= Alfred Delilia =

French playwright, journalist and chansonnier (1844–1916)

- Born: Alfred Georges Marie Delilia; 16 September 1844; Paris
- Died: 15 May 1916 (aged 71); Paris
- Occupations: Playwright, journalist, chansonnier

Alfred Delilia, full name Alfred Georges Marie Delilia, (16 September 1844 – 5 May 1916) was a French playwright, journalist, and chansonnier.

== Biography ==
A journalist under the pseudonyms Georges Davray for L'Événement and Alfred Didier for Le Voltaire, publication director of the L'Écho de la Légion d'honneur, he was dramaturge of the Théâtre Antoine. From 1897, his plays were presented on the most important Parisian stages of the end of the 19th-century and the beginning of the 20th including the Théâtre des Bouffes-Parisiens, Théâtre Déjazet, and the Théâtre des Délassements-Comiques.

== Works ==
- On nous écrit de Marseille, vaudeville in 1 act, 1867
- Au Grand-Cerf, vaudeville in 3 acts, with Charles Le Senne, 1869
- La Bonne à Venture, vaudeville in 1 act, with Le Senne, 1872
- Les Mémoires d'un flageolet, vaudeville in 3 acts, with Le Senne, 1872
- Le Théâtre Scribe, à-propos in verses, with Le Senne, 1874
- Allons bébé !, song, music by Robert Planquette, 1879
- Le Bout de l'an de l'amour !, song, music by Planquette, 1883
- Je ne suis pas vantard, monologue, 1883
- L'Inventeur, monologue, 1885
- Le Terrible Bonnivet, comédie-vaudeville in 1 act, with Émile Seurat, 1885
- Les Chastes, couplets, with Paul Ferrier, music by Lucien Delormel, 1893
- Olympia, ballet in 2 acts, music by Antoine Banès, 1893
- La Revue sans gêne, revue in 3 acts, 9 tableaux, with Henri Blondeau and Hector Monréal, 1894
- Tout Paris à l'Olympia, revue in 2 acts and 3 tableaux, with Ferrier, 1897
- Qui va à la chasse, operetta in 1 act, with Eugène Héros, music by Émile Duhem, 1898
- La Czarda, 1900
- Le Monsieur de chez Maxim, with Ernest Henri Demanne, 1900
- Séduction !, valse chantée, music by Jane Vieu, 1902
- La Valse des rousses, poem, music by Vieu, 1904
- La Femme de César, comedy in 1 act, with Serge Basset, 1905
- Trottinette !, valse chantée, with Marguerite Ugalde, 1907

== Bibliography ==
- Georges d'Heylli, Dictionnaire des pseudonymes, 1869, (p. 101)
- Jules Martin, Nos auteurs et compositeurs dramatiques, 1897, (p. 160)
- Pierre Larousse, Nouveau Larousse illustré, supplément, 1906, (p. 176)
