= Buxeuil, Vienne =

Buxeuil
- Commune
- Location of Buxeuil
- Location within France Location within Nouvelle-Aquitaine
- Coordinates: 46°58′22″N 0°41′35″E
- Country: France
- Region: Nouvelle-Aquitaine
- Department: Vienne
- Arrondissement: Châtellerault
- Canton: Châtellerault-2
- Intercommunality: CA Grand Châtellerault

Government
  - Mayor (2020–2026): David Cathelin
- Area^{1}: 11.96 km^{2} (4.62 sq mi)
- Elevation: 45 m (148 ft)
- Highest elevation: 115 m (377 ft)
- Lowest elevation: 38 m (125 ft)
- Population (2023): 887
  - Density: 74.2/km^{2} (192/sq mi)
- Time zone: UTC+01:00 (CET)
  - Summer (DST): UTC+02:00 (CEST)
- INSEE/Postal code: 86042 /37160
- ^{1} French Land Register data, which excludes lakes, ponds, glaciers > 1 km^{2} (0.386 sq mi or 247 acres) and river estuaries.

Buxeuil is a commune in the Vienne department in the Nouvelle-Aquitaine region in western France.

== Demographics ==
Historical population
Year	Pop.	±% p.a.
1968	677	—
1975	765	+1.76%
1982	847	+1.47%
1990	896	+0.71%
1999	900	+0.05%
2007	930	+0.41%
2012	952	+0.47%
2017	939	−0.27%
2023	887	−0.95%
Source: INSEE

== See also ==
- Communes of the Vienne department
