= Maxime Boucheron =

French playwright and chansonnier

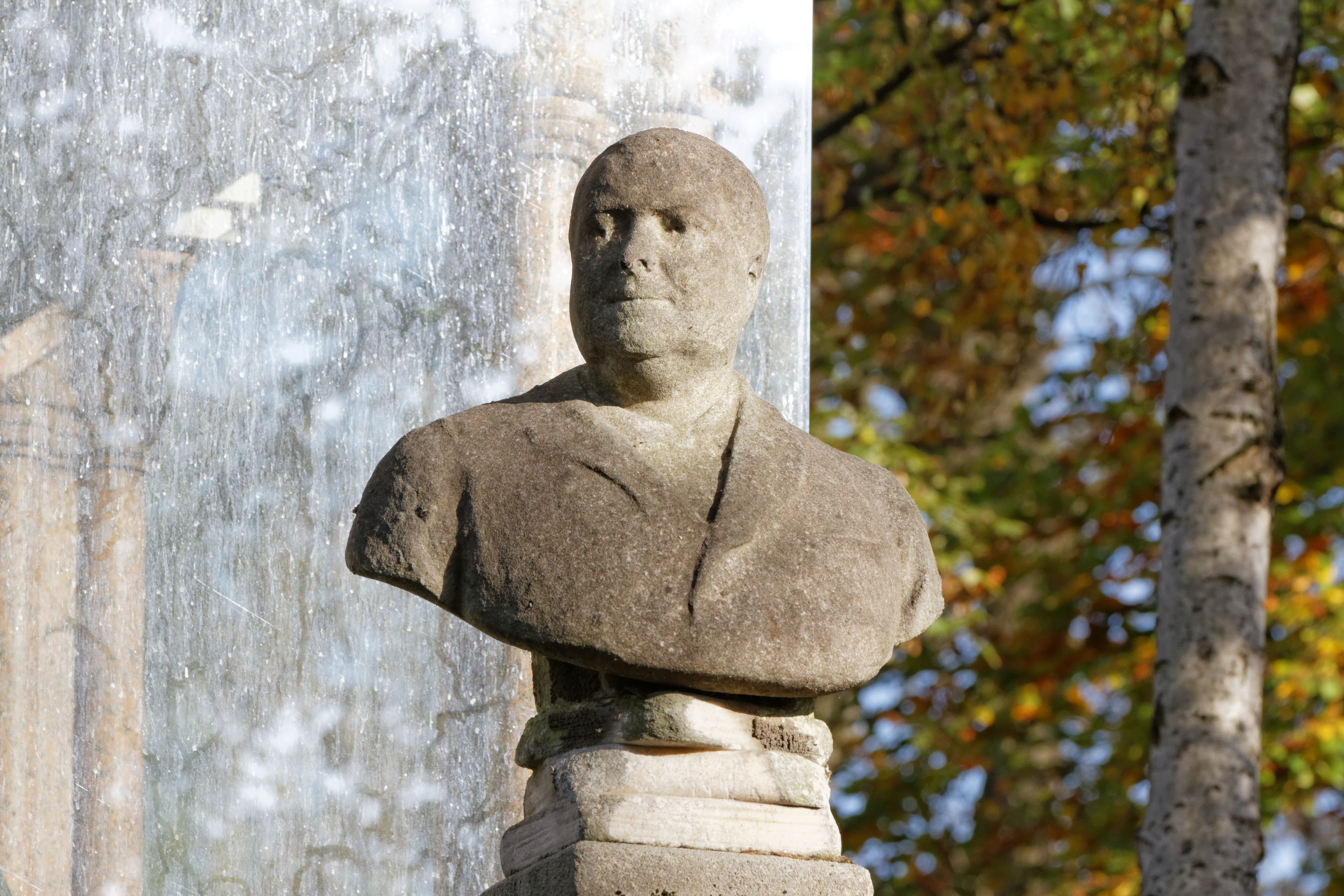
- Maxime Boucheron's bust on top of his grave
- Born: René Maximilien; 9 March 1846; Paris
- Died: 10 November 1896 (aged 50); Paris

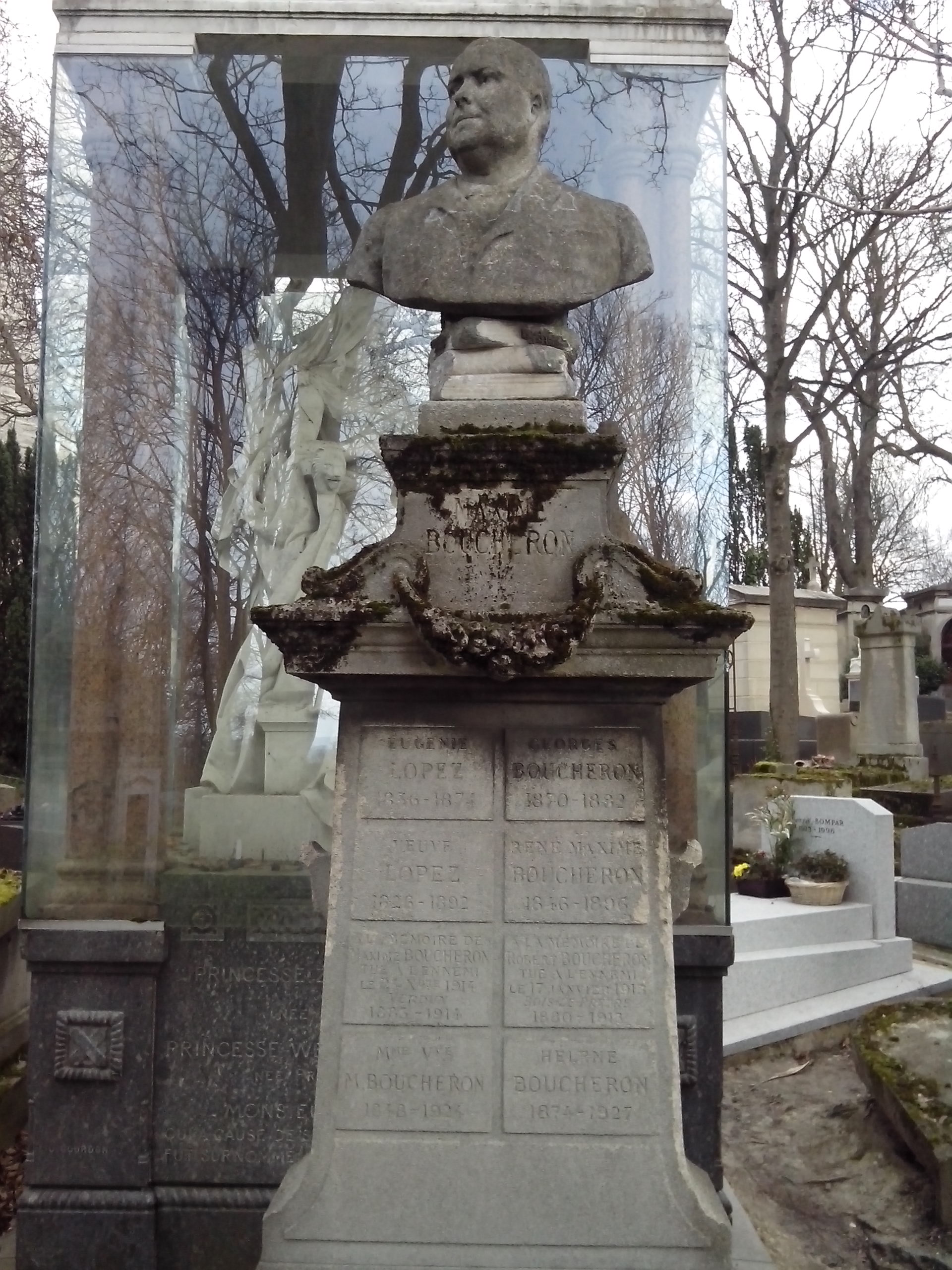
Maxime Boucheron's grave at Père Lachaise Cemetery

Maxime Boucheron, real name René Maximilien (9 March 1846 – 10 November 1896), was a French playwright and chansonnier.

== Biography ==
An employee at the Préfecture of Paris, he became an editor at Le Figaro where he was responsible for the theatre critics. His comic operas, vaudevilles, operettas and other works, written from the 1870s to the 1890s, were performed on the most significant Parisian stages of his time, including Théâtre des Folies-Dramatiques, Théâtre de la Renaissance and Théâtre des Variétés.

He is buried at the Père Lachaise Cemetery (47th division).

== Works ==
- 1878: Le Droit du seigneur, opéra comique in 3 acts, with Paul Burani
- 1879: Le Billet de logement, opéra-comique in 3 acts, with Paul Burani
- 1880: Le Ménage Popincourt, vaudeville in 1 act, with Raymond
- 1880: Le Voyage en Amérique, fantaisie, operetta in 4 acts, with Raymond
- 1882: Le Petit parisien, opéra comique in 3 acts, with Burani
- 1883: L'Ami d'Oscar, opéra comique in 1 act
- 1883: Le Bouquet de violettes, opéra comique in 1 act, with Georges Grisier
- 1887: Chanson du Point du jour, lyrics by Boucheron and Grisier, music by André Martinet
- 1888: Cocard et Bicoquet, comedy-vaudeville in 3 acts, with Hippolyte Raymond
- 1888: La divine comédie... française
- 1888: La Légende du magyar, opéra comique in 3 acts
- 1888: Mimi, vaudeville en 3 actes, with Raymond
- 1890: La D'moiselle, du téléphone, lyrics by Maxime Boucheron, music by André Martinet
- 1890: Le Roi des bonneteurs, Marpon et Flammarion
- 1890: Miss Helyett, opérette in 3 acts, 1891, music by Edmond Audran
- 1891: Le Mitron, vaudeville-operetta in 3 acts, with Mars
- 1891: Maldonne, comédie-bouffe in 1 act
- 1892: Sainte Freya, opéra comique in 3 acts, music by Audran
- 1892: Article de Paris, operetta in 3 actes, music by Audran
- 1894: Les Forains, operetta in 3 acts, with Antony Mars, music by Louis Varney
- 1895: La Duchesse de Ferrare, opéretta in 3 actes, music by Audran
- 1895: Le Pèlerinage, comedy in 4 acts, with Maurice Ordonneau
- 1896: Tante Agnès, operetta bouffa in 2 acts

== Bibliography ==
- Henry A. Parys, Histoire anecdotique de l'opérette, 1945, (p. 147)
- Manuel Gómez García, Diccionario Akal de Teatro, 1998, (p. 112)
- Kurt Gänzl, The Encyclopedia of the Musical Theatre: A-Gi, 2001, (p. 223)

== Sources ==
Jules Moiroux, Le cimetière du Père Lachaise, Paris, S. Mercadier, 1908 read online
