= Georges Grisier =

French playwright and journalist (1853–1909)

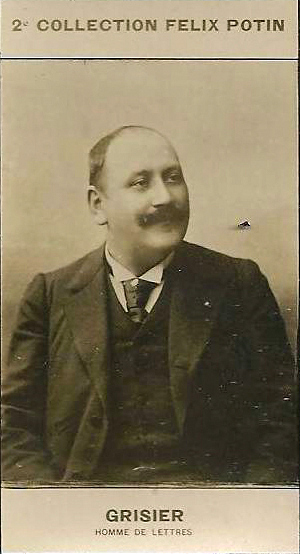
- Georges Grisier (1908)
- Born: 2 February 1853; Paris
- Died: 5 June 1909 (aged 56); Paris
- Occupations: Playwright, journalist

Auguste Marc Alphonse Georges Grisier (2 February 1853 – 5 June 1909) was a French playwright and journalist.

He collaborated to numerous newspapers such as Le Figaro, Paris-Journal, Le Peuple français, La Patrie, La France or L’Écho de France and was managing director of the Théâtre des Bouffes-Parisiens in 1895.

His plays were performed, inter alia at the Théâtre de la Porte-Saint-Martin and the Théâtre de l'Ambigu.

== Works ==
- 1884 : Le Bouquet de violettes, opéra comique in one act, with Maxime Boucheron
- 1885 : Pêle-mêle gazette, revue in 4 acts and 7 tableaux, with Blondeau and Monréal
- 1886 : Paris en général, revue, with Henri Blondeau and Hector Monréal
- 1886 : Le Petit Canuchon, vaudeville in 4 acts, with Monréal
- 1888 : Roger la honte, drama in 5 acts and 8 tableaux, with Jules Mary
- 1890 : Le Régiment, drama in 5 acts and 8 tableaux, with Mary
- 1890 : Prix de Beauté, comedy-ballet in 3 acts, with Edmond Rostand
- 1892 : Maître d'Armes, drama in 5 acts and 9 tableaux, with Mary
- 1895 : Au clair de la lune, revue, with Blondeau and Monréal

== Bibliography ==
- Henri Avenel, La presse française au vingtième siècle, 1901, (p. 271)
- Florian Bruyas, Histoire de l'opérette en France, 1855-1965, 1974, (p. 285)
- Éloges funèbres des sociétaires décédés. Bulletin de l'Association des journalistes parisiens, 10 April 1910, (pp. 29-31), available at Gallica.
