= Félix Baumaine =

French playwright (1828–1881)

- Born: Félix Gratien Baumaine; 4 December 1828; Reims
- Died: 3 January 1881 (aged 52); Courbevoie
- Occupation(s): Playwright, composer, chansonnier

Félix Baumaine, full name Félix Gratien Baumaine (4 December 1828 – 3 January 1881), was a 19th-century French playwright, composer and chansonnier.

The son of Joseph Baumaine, director of the shows in the city of Reims, Felix Baumaine is known for his collaboration with Charles Blondelet with whom he composed many songs played especially in cafés-concerts. He was thus himself the author of 1300 songs. During the last years of his life, Félix Baumaine was administrator of the Café des Ambassadeurs. He was the father of actress Juliette Baumaine.

== Biography ==
Son of Joseph Baumaine, director of entertainment for the city of Reims, Félix Baumaine is known for his collaboration with Charles Blondelet, with whom he composed numerous songs that were performed in café-concerts.He himself wrote 1,300 songs. During the last years of his life, Félix Baumaine was the manager of the Café des Ambassadeurs. He is the father of actress Juliette Baumaine.

== Works ==
- 1868: Le beau Paris, in collaboration with Charles Blondelet, saynete-bouffe set in music by Léon Roques; Egrot
- 1879: L'assommoir procédé d'une conférence sur l'Assommoir, ambiguë parodie in one act in collaboration with Charles Blondelet; Le Bailly
