= Paul Burani =

French author, actor, songwriter and librettist

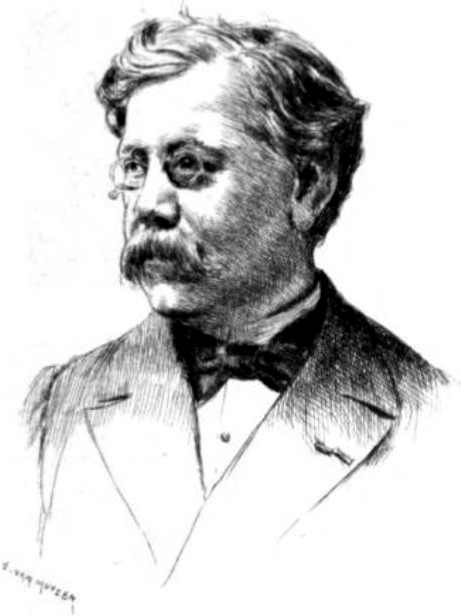
Paul Burani

Paul Burani (born Urbain Roucoux; Paris, 26 March 1845 – Paris, 9 October 1901), was a French author, actor, songwriter and librettist.

He had a short career as an actor at the Théâtre de Belleville and in the French provinces, after which he directed a journal, Le Café-Concert. At the commencement of his career as a songwriter he used the name Burani, an anagram of his first name.

== Works ==
He collaborated on libretti for the following operas:

- Le Droit du seigneur (with Maxime Boucheron), music by Léon Vasseur - 1878
- Le Billet de logement (with Boucheron), Vasseur - 1879
- La Barbière improvisée (with Jules Montini), Joseph O'Kelly - 1882
- Le Petit Parisien (with Boucheron), Vasseur - 1882
- François les bas-bleus (with Ernest Dubreuil and Eugène Humbert), André Messager - 1883
- Le Mariage au tambour (after Alexandre Dumas), Vasseur - 1886
- Le roi malgré lui (with Emile de Najac), Emmanuel Chabrier - 1887
- Ninon de Lenclos (with Blavet), Vasseur, 1887
- Le Puits qui parle (with Beaumont), Edmond Audran - 1888
- Le Prince soleil (with Hippolyte Raymond), Vasseur - 1889
- Le Commandant Laripete (with Silvestre, Valabrigue), Vasseur - 1892
- Le Cabinet Piperlin (with Raymond), Hervé - 1897

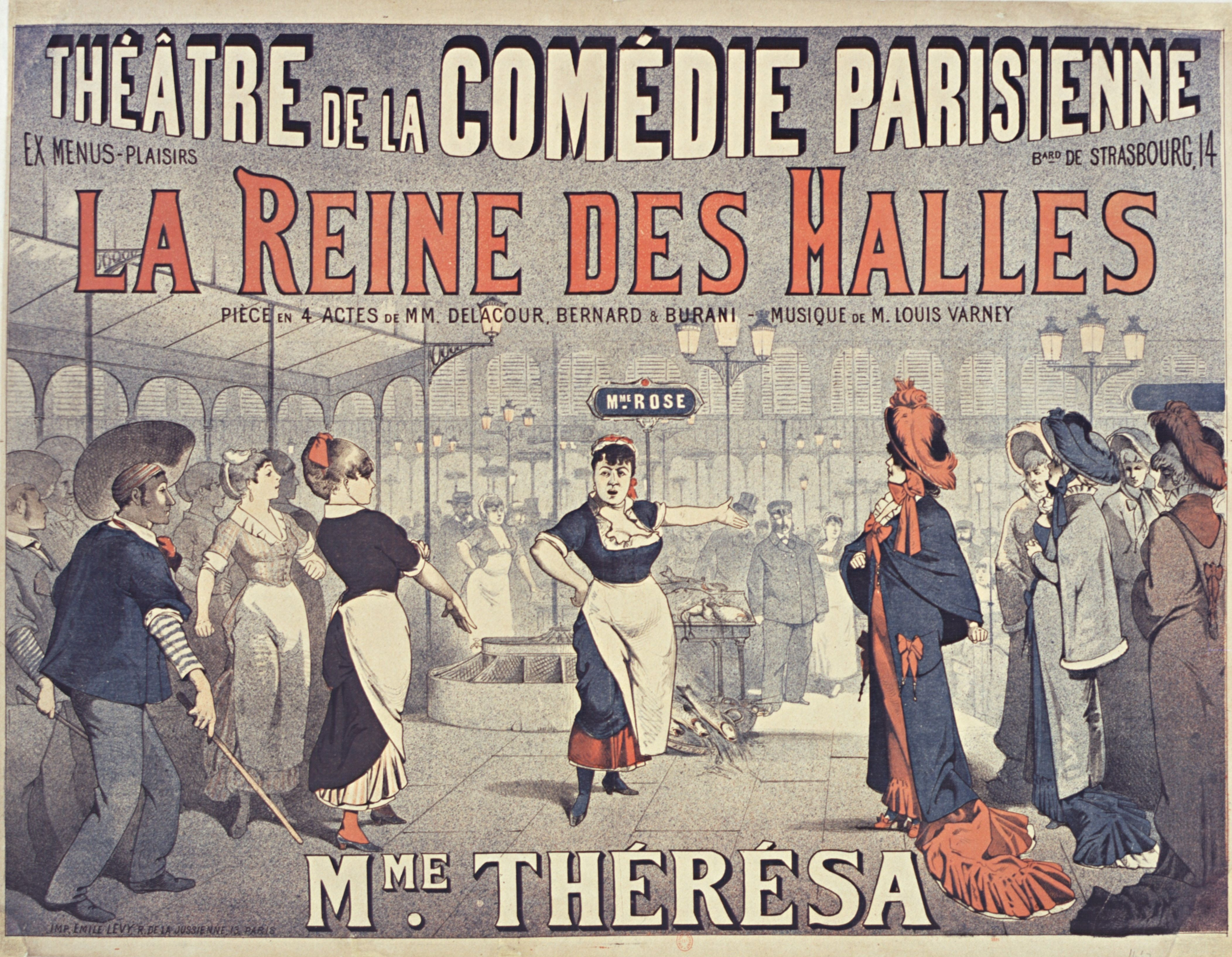
La Reine des Halles at the Théâtre de la Comédie-Parisienne (1881)

Le Sire de Fisch Ton Kan was a popular song during the Paris Commune (1871), with words by Paul Burani and music by Antonin Louis, which denounced Napoléon III who was leading France to military disasters; the song contains many plays on words.
