= Hector Monréal =

French illustrator, chansonnier and playwright (1839–1910)

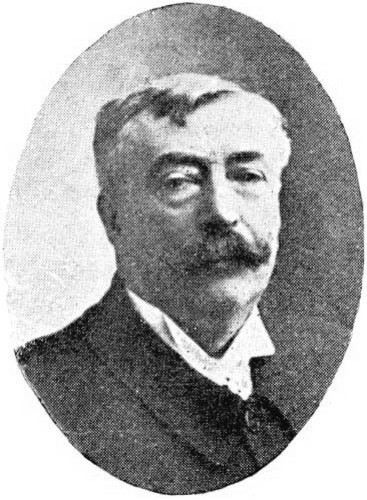
- (unknown date)
- Born: Joseph Marie Ylpize Rieunier; 17 July 1839; Carcassonne, France
- Died: 20 May 1910 (aged 70); Asnières-sur-Seine, France
- Occupations: Illustrator, chansonnier and playwright

Hector Monréal (17 July 1839 – 20 May 1910) was a French illustrator, chansonnier and playwright, mostly known for his song "Frou-frou".

== Career ==
A draftsman at the French Ministry of War, he left this position in 1862 to engage as an actor for the Paris's Théâtre Montmartre (1862–1864). He then became a cartoonist at Paris's Le Petit Journal where he made the summary-signs posted every morning at the newspaper's door. He then embarked into theatrical writing with Henri Blondeau. For forty years, their plays were interpreted on the most important Parisian stages of the 19th and 20th centuries, including Théâtre des Variétés, Théâtre du Château-d'Eau, Théâtre des Folies-Dramatiques, etc.

Several of his songs were recorded and interpreted by Suzy Delair, Berthe Sylva, Bourvil or Line Renaud inter alia.

=== Works ===
- 1863: Les Oranges de mon étagère, chansonnette, music by Henri Cellot
- 1865: Ça n'coûte que deux sous ! grrrrande revue du moment déroulée tous les soirs par Heudebert au Café-concert du boulevard du Temple, with Blondeau
- 1867: Les Garçons charcuitiers !, poésie bachique et mélodique
- 1867: Les Marchands de bois, vaudeville in one act, with Saint-Yves
- 1867: Le Trombonne guérisseur (chanté dans les concerts de Paris)
- 1868: Les Hannetons de l'année, revue in three acts and eight tableaux, including a prologue, with Blondeau
- 1868: Tapez-moi là-d'ssus !..., revue in four acts and eight tableaux, including one prologue, with Blondeau
- 1870: V'là les bêtises qui recommencent, revue in four acts and eight tableaux, with Blondeau
- 1872: Qui veut voir la lune ?, revue fantaisie in three acts and eight tableaux, with Blondeau
- 1872: Paris dans l'eau, vaudeville aquatique in four acts, with Blondeau
- 1872: Une poignée de bêtises, revue in two acts and three tableaux, with Blondeau
- 1872: La Veuve Malbrough, operetta in one act, with Blondeau
- 1873: La Nuit des noces de la Fille Angot, vaudeville in one act, with Blondeau
- 1873: Les Pommes d'or, operetta féerie in three acts and twelve tableaux, with Blondeau, Henri Chivot and Alfred Duru
- 1874: La Comète à Paris, revue in three acts and ten tableaux, with Blondeau
- 1874: Ah ! c'est donc toi Mme la Revue !..., revue in three acts and ten tableaux, with Blondeau
- 1875: Pif-Paf, féerie in five acts, including one prologue and twenty tableaux, with Blondeau and Clairville
- 1875: La revue à la vapeur, actualité parisienne in one act and three tableaux, with Blondeau and Paul Siraudin
- 1876: L'Ami Fritz-Poulet, parodie à la fourchette, mêlée de chansons à boire et à manger, en deux services, deux entremets et un dessert, with Blondeau
- 1877: Les Environs de Paris, voyage d'agrément in four acts and eight tableaux, with Blondeau
- 1883: Une nuit de noces, folie-vaudeville in one act, with Blondeau
- 1884: Au clair de la lune, revue in four acts and eight tableaux, with Blondeau and Georges Grisier
- 1885: Pêle-mêle gazette, revue in four acts and seven tableaux, with Blondeau and Grisier
- 1885: La Serinette de Jeannot, vaudeville in one act, with Blondeau
- 1885: Les Terreurs de Jarnicoton, vaudeville-pantomime in one act, with Blondeau
- 1886: Paris en général, revue in four acts and ten tableaux, with Blondeau and Grisier
- 1886: Le Petit Canuchon, vaudeville in four acts, with Grisier
- 1887: Mam'zelle Clochette, vaudeville in one act, with Blondeau
- 1887: Paris-cancans, revue in three acts and eight tableaux, with Blondeau
- 1887: La Petite Francillon, little parody in one little prologue, three little acts and two little intermissions, with Blondeau and Alphonse Lemonnier
- 1888: Paris-boulevard, revue in three acts, eight tableaux, with Blondeau
- 1889: Paris Exposition, revue in three acts, nine tableaux, with Blondeau
- 1891: Paris port de mer, revue in three acts, seven tableaux, with Blondeau
- 1892: Les Variétés de l'année, revue in three acts and nine tableaux, with Blondeau
- 1893: Les Rouengaines de l'année, revue in three acts (seven tableaux including a prologue), with Ernest Morel
- 1894: La Revue sans gêne, revue in three acts, nine tableaux, with Blondeau and Alfred Delilia
- 1894: Vive Robinson !, duo sans accords, with Blondeau and Delilia, music by Lucien Collin
- 1895: Tout Paris en revue, revue in three acts and nine tableaux, with Blondeau
- 1896: Une Semaine à Paris, revue in three acts (eleven tableaux), with Blondeau
- 1897: Paris qui marche, revue in three acts, ten tableaux, with Blondeau
- 1897: Paris sur scène, revue in three acts, eight tableaux, with Blondeau
- 1898: Folies-Revue, revue in three acts, nine tableaux
- 1900: Madame Méphisto, pièce à spectacle, in two acts and five tableaux, with Blondeau
- 1901: La Nouvelle bonne, vaudeville in one act
- 1901: Paris-joujoux, revue in two acts and aix tableaux, with Blondeau
- 1903: Le Cirque Ponger's, bouffonnerie with extravaganza in one act
- 1903: Paris qui chante, revue féerie in two acts and twelve tableaux, with Blondeau
- 1903: Olympia, revue in four tableaux, with Blondeau
- 1904: On demande une étoile, scènes de la vie de théâtre, with Blondeau
- 1909: Une Affaire arrangée, comedy in one act, with Ferdinand Bloch

== Bibliography ==
- Pierre Larousse, Nouveau Larousse illustré, supplément, 1906, p. 385 et Larousse mensuel illustré, volume 1, 1910, p. 758
- Silvio D'Amico, Enciclopedia dello spettacolo, volume 5, 1962, p. 125
