= Léon Roques =

French transcriber

Jean Léon Roques (born 24 October 1839 in Aurignac, died 1923) was a French transcriber, accompanist, and composer, who is best known for his transcriptions of Claude Debussy and Maurice Ravel. Perhaps his most familiar transcription is for violin and piano of Debussy's piano work La plus que lente.
