= Alhambra (Paris) =

Theatre in Paris, France

- Théâtre Art Déco des Cheminots (1920–1933)
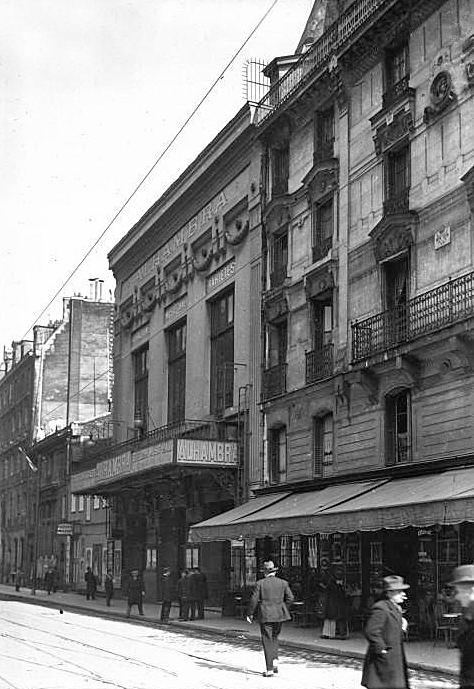
- Facade of the old Alhambra-Maurice Chevalier at 50, rue de Malte, Paris in 1925
- Interactive map of Alhambra
- Address: 21, rue Yves-Toudic; Paris; France
- Coordinates: 48°52′14″N 2°21′48″E
- Capacity: 600
- Type: Music hall

Construction
- Opened: 15 April 2008

Website
- www.alhambra-paris.com

The Alhambra is a theatre which opened in April 2008 at 21, rue Yves-Toudic in the 10th arrondissement of Paris, 300 meters from the site of the old Alhambra-Maurice Chevalier.

== History ==
The Alhambra occupies a building originally opened in 1920 by the Paris Fraternal Railway Association as a 600-seat theatre called the Théâtre Art Déco des Cheminots (Art Deco Theatre of the Railways). The elaborate furnishings included beautiful mahogany doors, geometric chandeliers, and stucco pillars — surmounted all by a bas-relief of a locomotive. The theatre, which had never been legally recognized as a theater by the Paris authorities, was converted to a commercial building in 1933, but it still contained a drive-in theater reserved for railway workers. Unfortunately, this drive-in theater was rarely open.

In 2005 the quaint charm and history of the site captured the attention of theatrical producer Jean-Claude Auclair; he immediately bought the building with the intention of restoring it. Unfortunately, modern standards of safety, and the fact that the theatre had no acoustic insulation and no air conditioning forced Auclair to demolish much of the original structure and to rebuild it entirely. Under the direction of architect Pascal Lépissier they created a completely soundproof auditorium inside a shell of concrete and steel, weighing 60 tons, and set on springs. It took two years and cost three million euros.

The new theatre eventually opened in 2008 and was named the Alhambra, as a tribute to its famous former neighbor, the old Alhambra Maurice Chevalier. The new Alhambra has continued the music hall tradition of its predecessor, with an eclectic array of performers from the worlds of indie rock, jazz, punk rock, African American folk, rap, world music, heavy metal, garage band rock, pop—even manouche jazz. However, all that remains of the original Art Deco decor is a monumental staircase leading to the balcony.

== Performers ==
Entertainers who have performed at the Alhambra include:

- Duke Ellington
- Thelonious Monk
- Steve Lukather
- Calvin Harris
- Les Fatals Picards
- Agnès Bihl
- Murray Head
- Alain Chamfort
- Dick Rivers
- Michel Fugain
- La Grande Sophie
- Joel Prevost
- Amandine Bourgeois
- Quentin Mosimann
- Richie Havens
- Doro
- Roots Manuva
- Yuksek
- Thee Silver Mt. Zion Memorial Orchestra
- Nils Landgren Funk Unit
- Robbie Williams
- Crashdïet
- Angelo Debarre
- Iced Earth
- Morrissey
- HushPuppies
- Fink
- The Walkmen
- Sugar Sammy
- Elisa
- Plini
