= Louis Péricaud =

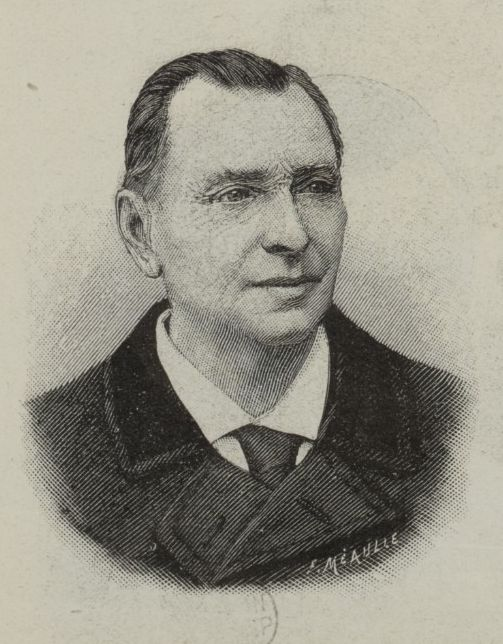
Louis Péricaud

Louis Jean Péricaud (10 June 1835, La Rochelle – 12 November 1909, Paris) was a 19th-century French stage actor, chansonnier, playwright, theatre historian and theatre director.

He was the father of actress Berthe Jalabert (1858–c.1935) and the uncle of actor Gustave Hamilton (1871–1951).

== Works ==
Selected plays

- 1864: Le Diable au Havre, grande revue-féerie in 4 acts and 5 tableaux, with Richard Lesclide, Théâtre du Havre, 13 January
- 1873: À cache-cache comedy in one act in verse and in prose, with Carle Le Dhuy, Théâtre du Vaudeville, 25 July
- 1876: Les Trois grâces, pochade musicale, with Lucien Delormel and Gaston Villemer, Alcazar d'Été
- 1877: La Jeunesse de Béranger, one-act operetta, music by Firmin Bernicat, L'Eldorado, 20 January
- 1878: Une aventure de Clairon, one-act operetta, with Gaston Villemer, L'Eldorado, 23 November
- 1881: Les Chevau-Légers, one-act operetta, with Lucien Delormel, music by Robert Planquette, L'Eldorado, 15 December
- 1885: Les Français au Tonkin, military play in 5 acts and 10 tableaux, including one prologue, with Gaston Marot and Henri Noellet, Paris, Théâtre du Château-d'Eau, 9 February
- 1886: Le Père Chasselas, drama in 5 acts, with Jean Athis, music by George Rose Théâtre du Château-d'Eau, 19 November
- 1887: Les Grenadiers de Mont-Cornette, opéra bouffe in 3 acts, with Lucien Delormel, music by Charles Lecocq, Théâtre des Bouffes-Parisiens, 4 January
- 1887: Polichinelle, drama in 5 acts and 8 tableaux, extractc from the Mansardes de Paris by Pierre Zaccone, with Ernest Vois, Bordeaux, Bouffes-Bordelais, 9 June
- 1889: Jack l'éventreur, drama in 5 acts and 7 tableaux, with Gaston Marot, Théâtre du Château-d'Eau, 30 August
- 1891: Madame la maréchale, play in 3 acts, with Alphonse Lemonnier, Théâtre de l'Ambigu, 8 June
- 1893: La Mère la Victoire, drama in 5 acts and 7 tableaux, with Gaston Marot, Théâtre du Château-d'Eau, 10 March
- 1894: La Belle limonadière, drama in 5 acts and 8 tableaux, with Émile Blondet, Théâtre de l'Ambigu, 20 July
- 1895: La Belle Grêlée, drama in 5 acts and 7 tableaux, from the novel by Alexis Bouvier, with Stéphen Lemonnier, Théâtre de la République, 10 December
- 1897: L'Hercule Farnèse, one-act comedy, Théâtre de Cluny, 2 September
- 1898: La Fille aux écus, drama in 5 acts, Théâtre de la République, 20 August
- 1898: La Turlutaine de Marjolin, comédie en vaudeville in 3 acts, with Maurice Soulié and Charles Darantière, Théâtre Déjazet, 30 November
- 1903: L'Hameçon, comédie en vaudeville in 3 acts, with Charles Darantière and Louis Bouvet, Théâtre-Trianon, 17 February
- 1906: L'Hôtellerie sanglante, drama in 5 acts and 7 tableaux, from the novel by Paul Mahalin, Théâtre Montparnasse, 20 January
- 1906: La Mioche dorée, drama in 5 acts, with Alphonse Lemonnier, Théâtre de la Gaîté, 14 June
- 1909! Pierre de lune, play in 5 acts and 7 tableaux, after Wilkie Collins, with Henri Desfontaines, Théâtre de la Porte Saint-Martin, 15 June

History of theatre

- 1863: Voyage à travers le théâtre
- 1897: Le Théâtre des Funambules, ses mimes, ses acteurs et ses pantomimes, depuis sa fondation jusqu'à sa démolition Text online
- 1908: Histoire de l'histoire des grands et des petits théâtres de Paris pendant la Révolution, le Consulat et l'Empire : Théâtre de Monsieur
- 1909: Histoire de l'histoire des grands et des petits théâtres de Paris pendant la Révolution, le Consulat et l'Empire : Théâtre des Petits comédiens de S. A. S. Mgr le Cte de Beaujolais Text online
- 1922: Le Panthéon des comédiens, de Molière à Coquelin aîné, preface by Coquelin aîné Text online

== Some performances ==
As director

- 1889: Xavier de Montépin and Jules Dornay: La Porteuse de pain, Théâtre de l'Ambigu, 11 January
- 1896: Eugène Brieux, Les Bienfaiteurs, Théâtre de la Porte-Saint-Martin, 22 October
- 1900: Edmond Haraucourt : Jean Bart, Théâtre de la Porte-Saint-Martin, 5 April
- 1901: Émile Bergerat : La Pompadour, Théâtre de la Porte-Saint-Martin, 13 November
- 1902: Auguste Maquet : La Maison du baigneur, Théâtre de la Porte-Saint-Martin, 6 October
- 1905: Octave Feuillet : Le Roman d'un jeune homme pauvre, Théâtre de la Gaîté, 12 September
- 1907: Jean Aicard : Le Manteau du Roi, Théâtre de la Porte-Saint-Martin, 22 October

Comedian

- 1881: Gaston Marot: Casse-Museau, Théâtre du Château-d'Eau, 13 December, as Casse-Museau
- 1890: L'Ogre by Jules de Marthold, Théâtre de l'Ambigu-Comique
- 1893: Napoléon by Léopold Martin-Laya, Théâtre de la Porte-Saint-Martin, 5 December as Talleyrand.
- 1895: Le Collier de la reine by Pierre Decourcelle, Théâtre de la Porte-Saint-Martin
- 1896: Jacques Callot by Henri Caïn, Eugène Adenis and Édouard Adenis, Théâtre de la Porte-Saint-Martin
- 1897: Edmond Rostand : Cyrano de Bergerac, Théâtre de la Porte-Saint-Martin, 28 December. as Montfleury and a cadet de Gascogne.
- 1902: Paul Anthelme Bourde, Nos deux consciences, Théâtre de la Porte-Saint-Martin, 15 November, as Lancelin.
- 1905: Scarron de Catulle Mendès, directed by Jean Coquelin and Henry Hertz, music by Reynaldo Hahn, Théâtre de la Gaîté, as La Rancune
- 1905: Les Oberlé by Edmond Haraucourt after René Bazin, Théâtre de la Gaîté, as Philippe Oberlé.
- 1906: L'Attentat by Alfred Capus and Lucien Descaves, Théâtre de la Gaîté, as Postel.

== Sources ==
- Henry Lyonnet, Dictionnaire des comédiens français, Genève : Bibliothèque de la Revue universelle internationale illustrée, 1902–1908, vol. II, p. 516-518
- Louis Péricaud on Art Lyrique
