= Jane Marnac =

Belgian actress (1892–1976)

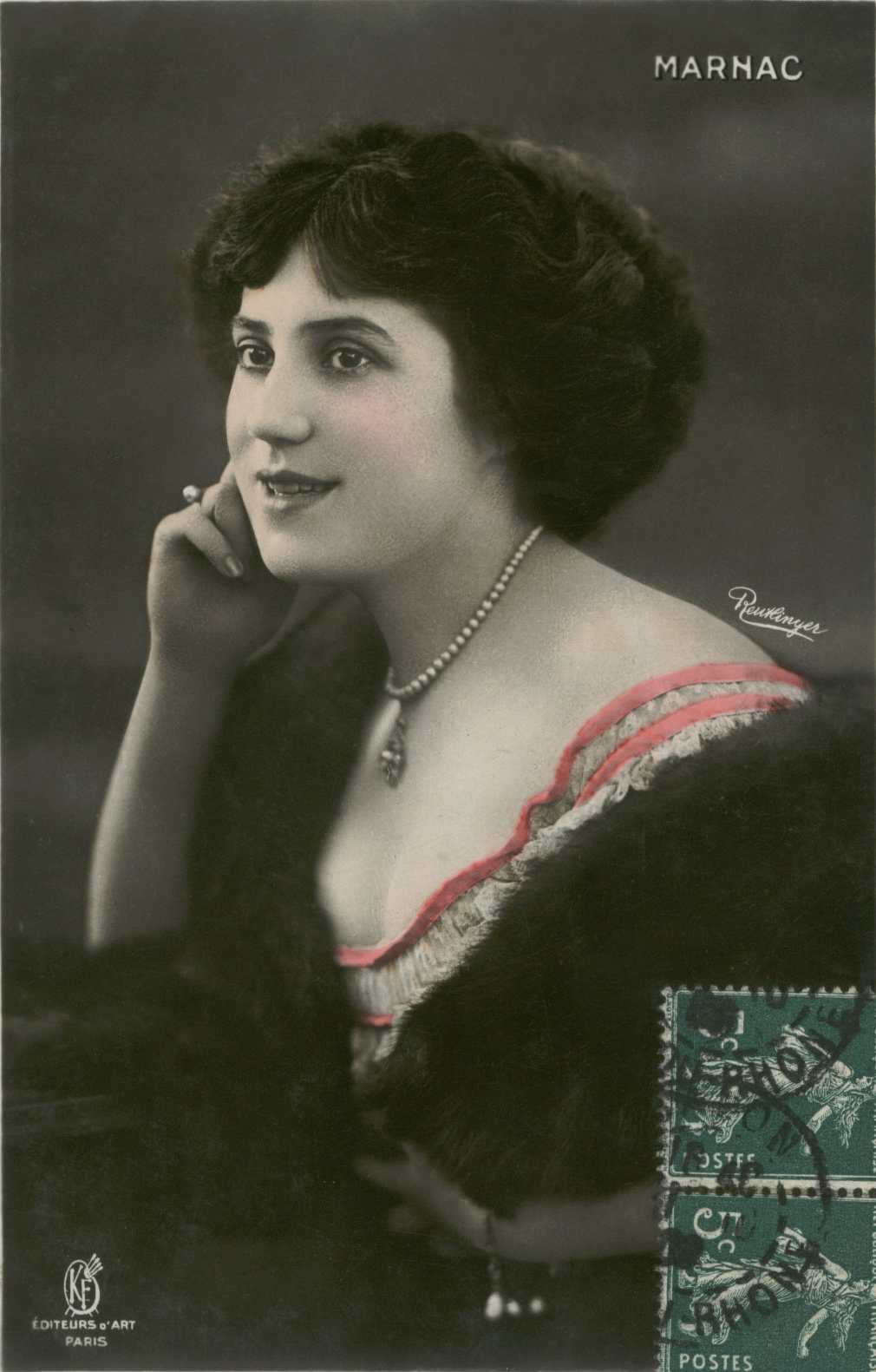
- Jane Marnac
- Born: Jane Fernande Mayer; 8 February 1892; Brussels
- Died: 2 December 1976 (aged 84); 16th arrondissement of Paris
- Other names: Jeanne Marnac, Jane Trevor
- Occupation: Actress
- Years active: 1912 - 1938

Signature
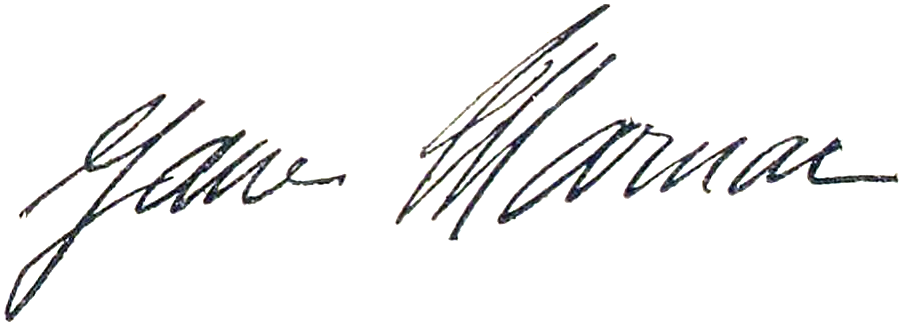

Jane Marnac, real name Jane Fernande Mayer, (8 February 1892 – 2 December 1976), also seen as Jeanne Marnac, was a Belgian stage and film actress.

== Career ==
Marnac played hundreds of parts on stage, and sang in operettas including Au temps des valses by Noël Coward in 1930 at the Apollo. "Mlle. Marnac excels in the role of those heroines who, beginning life in the first act amid humble surroundings, manage to appear before the end of the last wreathed in pearls", Vanity Fair noted in 1922.

Marnac was considered a stylish stage beauty, with "the wonderful voice and the equally wonderful eyes." She was "said to possess the prettiest legs in all Paris." Her gowns and hats were described in fashion magazines. Her image was printed on postcards, posters, and other souvenirs. Her regimen for maintaining her complexion and figure was reported to be ice, rest, and exercise.

Jane Marnac appeared in films, including The Darling of Paris with Jean Gabin, and made musical recordings for the Columbia label in 1930. Josephine Baker performed a parasol dance imitating Marnac's appearance in Somerset Maugham's Rain. Marnac and her husband owned racehorses, and ran a production company together.

== Personal life ==
In 1927, Marnac married an English aviator, sportsman, and World War I veteran, Major Keith Trevor, as his second wife. He became the chair of the British Chamber of Commerce in Paris, and he died in 1956. She was the victim of a robbery in 1958, at her home in the Bois de Boulogne. She died in 1976, at the age of 84, in Paris.

== Theatre ==
- Paris fin de règne de Rip, Théâtre des Capucines (1912)
- Le Malade imaginaire by Molière, directed by André Antoine, théâtre Antoine (1912)
- Le Procureur Hallers by Louis Forest Henry de Gorsse after Paul Lindau, mise en scène Firmin Gémier, théâtre Antoine (1913)
- La Fille de Figaro by Maurice Hennequin and Hugues Delorme, music Xavier Leroux, théâtre de l'Apollo (1914)
- Monsieur chasse ! by Georges Feydeau, théâtre de la Renaissance (1916)
- All Right revue by Rip, théâtre Édouard VII (1916)
- La Reine joyeuse (nouveau titre de La Reine s'amuse) operetta by André Barde, music Charles Cuvillier, Apollo (1918)
- L'École des cocottes by Paul Armont and Marcel Gerbidon, théâtre du Grand-Guignol (1918)
- L'École des cocottes by Paul Armont and Marcel Gerbidon, théâtre Michel (1919)
- La Chasse à l'homme by Maurice Donnay, théâtre des Variétés (1919)
- La Belle Angevine by Maurice Donnay and André Rivoire, théâtre des Variétés (1922)
- La Petite Chocolatière by Paul Gavault, théâtre des Variétés (1922)
- Le Blanc et le noir by Sacha Guitry, théâtre des Variétés (1922)
- L'École des cocottes by Paul Armont and Marcel Gerbidon, théâtre du Palais-Royal (1923)
- Un jour de folie by André Birabeau, théâtre des Variétés (1923)
- Manon, Fille Galante, Théâtre de la Madeleine (1925)
- Rain, by Somerset Maugham, Théâtre de la Madeleine (1927)
- La Revue de Marigny revue de Jean Le Seyeux and Saint-Granier, théâtre Marigny (1928)
- Shanghaï by Charles Méré after John Colton, théâtre de l'Apollo (1929)
- Dans la rue by Elmer Rice, adaptation Francis Carco, directed by Pierre Geoffroy, Apollo (1929)
- Au temps des valses by Noël Coward, adaptation Saint-Granier, Apollo (1930)
- Fragonard by Gabriel Pierné, Porte Saint-Martin (1934)
- Femmes by Clare Boothe, adaptation Jacques Deval, directed by Jane Marnac, théâtre Pigalle (1938)

== Filmography ==
- The Hunchback of Notre Dame by Albert Capellani (1911, short)
- La Goualeuse by Alexandre Deverennes (1914)
- Le baromètre de la fidélité by Georges Monca (1915, short)
- Notre pauvre cœur by Louis Feuillade (1916)
- Paris pendant la guerre by Henri Diamant-Berger (1916)
- The Darling of Paris by Augusto Genina (1931)
- Le bal de petits lits blancs (1934)
