= Oscar Méténier =

French playwright and novelist (1859–1913)

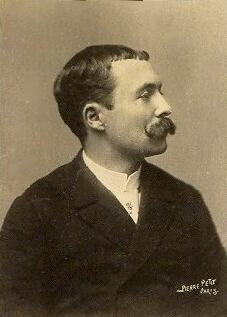
- Oscar Méténier
- Born: 17 January 1859; Sancoins, France
- Died: 2 September 1913 (aged 54)
- Occupations: Novelist, playwright

Oscar Méténier (17 January 1859 – 9 February 1913) was a French playwright and novelist. In 1897 he founded Le Théâtre du Grand-Guignol in Paris, planning it as a space for naturalist performance.

== Life ==
Born in Sancoins, Cher, the son of a police commissioner, Oscar Méténier at first followed his father into the police, as secretary to the commissariat of la Tour Saint-Jacques, in which role he was able to observe the morals of low-life Paris, for which he had a near-scientific interest and eye. Laurent Tailhade wrote of him:

Trussed in a harness, he guarded I know not what of the dashing and advantageous part of his nature which revealed in his person an irresistible under-officer [...] A young man without youth, with brown eyes and hair, and unexpressive etronds. His oily skin with the blackish-yellow colour of hepatics, proud teeth which he hardly cared for, a soldierly and pomaded moustache.

A follower of Émile Zola, Méténier wrote naturalist novellas, generally gravelly in style, and pieces in argot for Le Chat Noir. He made his reputation with naturalist plays set among vagabonds, Apaches and prostitutes and expressed in the language of the street. In 1896 his Mademoiselle Fifi, previously temporarily banned by the police, was the first ever French play to include a prostitute character. The following year, Méténier's Lui ! showed a meeting between a murderer and a prostitute in a hotel bedroom.

In 1897, Oscar Méténier bought a theatre at the end of the impasse Chaptal (9th arrondissement) to present his own plays. This was the Théâtre du Grand-Guignol, one of the most original theatres in Paris, and he remained its director until 1898.

== Works ==
=== Plays ===
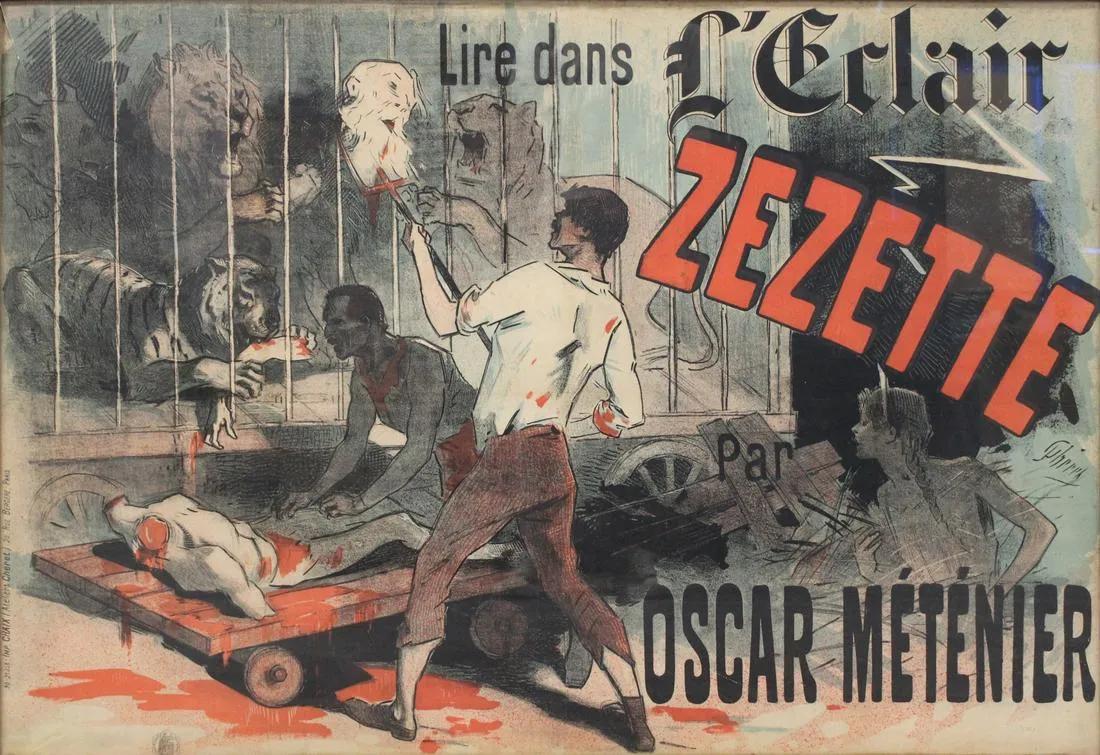
Jules Chéret, poster advertising the 1891 novel Zezette by Oscar Méténier.

- En famille, 1-act prose comedy, Paris, Théâtre-Libre, 30 May 1887
- La Puissance des Ténèbres, drama in six acts by Leo Tolstoy, French translation by Pavlovsky and Oscar Méténier, Paris, Théâtre-Libre, 10 February 1888
- La Casserole, 1-act prose drama, Paris, Théâtre-Libre, 31 May 1889
- Les Frères Zemganno, 3-act prose play, after Edmond and Jules de Goncourt, written in collaboration with Paul Alexis, Paris, Théâtre-Libre, 25 February 1890
- Monsieur Betsy, 4-act prose comedy, written in collaboration with Paul Alexis, Paris, Théâtre des Variétés, 3 March 1890
- La Confrontation, dramatic scene, Paris, Théâtre de la Scala, 21 December 1891
- La bonne à tout faire, 4-act prose comedy, in collaboration with Jean-Louis Dubut de Laforest, Paris, Théâtre des Variétés, 20 February 1892
- Rabelais, 4-act, 5-scene play, with Jean-Louis Dubut de Laforest, Paris, Nouveau-Théâtre, 25 October 1892
- Charles Demailly, 4-act prose play, after Edmond and Jules de Goncourt, in collaboration with Paul Alexis, Paris, Théâtre du Gymnase, 19 December 1892 (Summary by Willy and Edmond de Goncourt)
- Très Russe, 3-act play, in collaboration with Jean Lorrain, Paris, Théâtre-d'application (La Bodinière), 3 May 1893
- Mademoiselle Fifi, drama, after Guy de Maupassant's short story of the same name, Paris, Théâtre-Libre, 10 February 1896
- La Brême, mœurs populaires, drama, Paris, Théâtre du Grand-Guignol, 13 April 1897
- Le Loupiot, tableau de mœurs populaires, en 2 scènes, Paris, Théâtre du Grand-Guignol, 13 avril 1897
- Lui !, 1-act drama, Paris, Théâtre du Grand-Guignol, 11 November 1897
- La Revanche de Dupont l'Anguille, drame en 3 tableaux, Paris, Théâtre du Grand-Guignol, 1898
- Son poteau, drama, in collaboration with Raoul Ralph, Paris, Théâtre du Grand-Guignol, 10 April 1901
- Boule de suif, 3 act, 4 scene comedy, in collaboration with Guy de Maupassant, Paris, Théâtre Antoine, 6 May 1902
- Casque d'Or, drama, in collaboration with Fabrice Delphi, Paris, Théâtre Robinière, 16 March 1902
- Notre-Dame de la Butte, mœurs montmartroises, drama, in collaboration with Fabrice Delphi, 1907
- Madame ma sœur, 1-act play, 1910
- La Moukère, 1-act drama, in collaboration with René Mélinette, 1910
- Royal-cambouis, 1-act military play, Paris, Scala, 1910

=== Novels, novellas, essays ===
- La Chair (1885)
- La Grâce (1886)
- Madame Berwick (1888)
- Outre-Rhin (1888)
- Mynha-Maria (1889)
- Autour de la caserne, novellas (1890)
- Madame la Boule (1890)
- Le mari de Berthe (1890)
- Le Gorille, Parisian novel (1891) Text on www.gutenberg.org
- La Lutte pour l'amour, études d'argot (1891)
- Les Voyous au théâtre (1891)
- Zézette, mœurs foraines, novel (1891) Text on www.gutenberg.org
- Les Cabots (1892)
- Le Policier, roman
- Barbe-Bleue (1893)
- Le Beau monde (1893)
- Le Chansonnier populaire Aristide Bruant (1893)
- La Nymphomane, mœurs parisiennes (1893)
- Demi-castors (mœurs parisiennes) (1894)
- La Grâce. Décadence. Nostalgie (1894)
- La Vie de campagne. Marcelle (1894)
- Le 40^{e} d'artillerie. Les bêtes. Les hommes. La croix, novellas (1895)
- L'Amour vaincu. Bohème galante, bohème bourgeoise, novellas (1896)
- L'amour qui tue (1898)
- Reines de cœur, mœurs d'Outre-Rhin (1900-1910)
- Les Berlinois chez eux, vertus et vices allemands (1904)
- Une gamine vicieuse (1905)
- Le jeune télégraphiste (1905)
- Tartufes et satyres, unedited epic-dramatic novel (1905), which he wanted to form "a veritable encyclopaedia of the human passions" and was to have comprised : 1) Le marché aux vierges, 2) Le miroir à gigolettes, 3) Berlingot-la-Vache, 4) Les satyres en famille, 5) Les tricheuses de l'amour, 6) La môme claque-dents, 7) Le charcutier parfumé, etc.
- Les Amoureux de Mira, Parisian novel (1907)
- Nina Sartorelle : mœurs parisiennes (1907)
- Les Baronnes de Roche-Noire (1908)
- Reine de cœur (1908)
- Notre-Dame de la Butte (1908)
- La dernière aventure du Prince Curaçao (1910)
- Les méprises du cœur (1910)
- Soldes de contes (1911)
- Le grand chéri (1911)
