= Francis Gally =

French actor and playwright (1863-1918)

- Born: Francis Jean Mazières; 28 October 1863; Tarbes
- Died: 20 November 1918 (aged 55)
- Occupations: Actor, playwright

Francis Gally, real name Francis Jean Mazières, (28 October 1863 – 20 November 1918) was an early 20th-century French actor and playwright.

Francis Gally began a career in acting. He then turned to writing. He wrote numerous comédies en vaudeville and operettas. He worked in collaboration with the playwrights Hugues Delorme and Maurice Ordonneau as well as with the composer Henri Goublier.

In 1915, the operetta La Cocarde de Mimi-Pinson, a theatre play in honour of the poilus fighting for the French flag, was a triomph at the Théâtre de l'Apollo in Paris. At the beginning of World War I, midinettes nicknamed Mimi Pinson, were making tricolor rosettes for the benefit of solidarity funds (a work led by Gustave Charpentier). Henri Goublier thought that the current events could be a good subject operetta. Goublier obtained the agreement of Maurice Ordonneau, one of the fashionable authors of the time for the libretto, a project which Francis Gally joined. The operetta was presented 25 November 1915.

== Famous plays ==
(selection)

- 1903: Mille regrets !, cowritten with Hugues Delorme
- 1905: Le Coup de minuit, with Hugues Delorme
- 1906: Mes oncles s'amusent, with Hugues Delorme
- 1912: Cartouche, with Hugues Delorme
- 1913: L'Amour patriote, with Jean Kolb
- 1915: La cocarde de Mimi-Pinson, with Maurice Ordonneau on a music by Henri Goublier fils
- 1916: La Demoiselle du printemps, with Maurice ordonneau and Georges Léglise
- 1917: La Fiancée du lieutenant, on a music by Henri Goublier fils
