= Apollo (Paris) =

Coordinates: 48.8786°N 2.3300°E

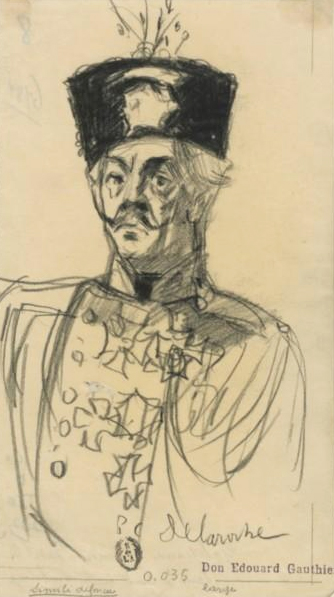
Félix Galipaux dans Le Comte de Luxembourg (1912)

The Apollo is a former French music-hall venue located at 20 rue de Clichy in the 9th arrondissement of Paris.

== History ==
The Apollo Theatre had a removable stage (now destroyed) called basculo conceived by the engineer Félix Léon Edoux.

In 1909 the Czech conductor and composer, Ludvík Čelanský, was artistic director and head of the symphony orchestra of the Apollo.

The actress Jane Marnac, her husband Keith Trevor, and Camille Wyn directed the Apollo in 1929 and 1930.

The Merry Widow (Franz Lehár) and Rêve de Valse (Oscar Straus) were premiered in the theatre. In addition, the Argentine tango singer Carlos Gardel made his Parisian debut here.

== Repertoire ==
- 1913 : La Jeunesse dorée, operetta by Henri Verne, music Marcel Lattès, with André Lefaur
- 1914 : La Fille de Figaro by Maurice Hennequin and Hugues Delorme, music Xavier Leroux, with Jane Marnac
- 1918 : La Reine joyeuse (new title of La Reine s'amuse), operetta by André Barde, music Charles Cuvillier, with Jane Marnac
- 1925 : Bouche à bouche, operetta by Maurice Yvain, libretto by André Barde, with Georges Milton
- 1929 : Le Procès de Mary Dugan by Bayard Veiller, adaptation Henry Torrès and Horace de Carbuccia, with Harry Baur
- 1929 : Dans la rue, after Street Scene by Elmer Rice, adaptation Francis Carco, with Marguerite Moreno
- 1929 : Shangaï de Charles Méré after John Colton, with Jane Marnac
- 1930 : Au temps des valses de Noël Coward, adaptation Saint-Granier, with Jane Marnac
- 1932 : Hector by Henri Decoin
- 1932 : Papavert by Chas.k.Gordon and Loic le Gouriadec after the work by George Froeschel
- 1943 : La Dame de minuit by Jean de Létraz, directed by Denis d'Inès
- 1944 : Mademoiselle Antoinette by Jean Guitton
- 1945 : L'Autre Aventure by Marcel Haedrich, directed by Jacques Erwin
- 1946 : La Nuit du 16 janvier by Ayn Rand, directed by Jacques Baumer
- 1946 : Un homme sans amour by Paul Vialar, directed by Fernand Ledoux, with Jean Chevrier, Marguerite Pierry
- 1946 : Un amour fou de Jean Guitton, with Jean-Pierre Kérien and Nine Assia
- 1952 : Monsieur de Panama by Jean de Létraz
- 1956 : Oncle Job by Robert Vattier and Albert Rieux
- 1956 : Via Mala after John Knittel, adaptation Paul Achard, directed by Jacques Clancy
- 1957 : La Corniflorette by André Ransan, directed by Jean-Jacques Daubin
- 1958 : Le Bossu after Paul Féval, adaptation Guy Haurey, directed by Jacques Dacqmine
- 1958 : Prométhée 48 by Roger Garaudy
