= Maurice Ordonneau =

French dramatist and composer

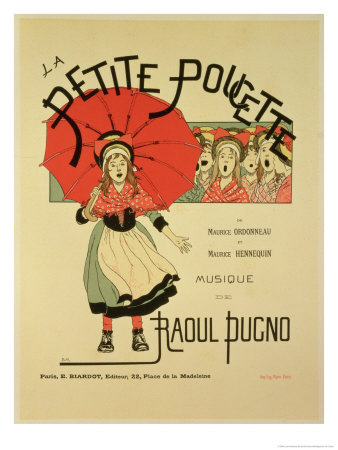
- La Petite Poucette
- Born: 18 June 1854; Saintes
- Died: 14 November 1916 (aged 72); Paris
- Occupations: Dramatist and composer.

Maurice Ordonneau (18 June 1854 – 14 November 1916) was a French dramatist and composer. The son of a merchant of eau de vie, Ordonneau was a prolific author in creating theatrical works. He composed, often with the collaboration of other playwrights, composers and musicians, a great number of operettas, opéra-bouffes, comedies and vaudevilles.

During some months after the death of the playwright Jean Gascogne, Ordonneau was responsible for the drama critic at La Libre Parole

== Principal works ==
- 1874: Les Rosières de carton, comedy, with Henry Buguet
- 1876: La Bague de Turlurette, comedy with Ernest Hamm
- 1876: Les Vacances de Toto, Comédie en vaudevilles, with Victor Bernard
- 1877: Zigzags dans Versailles, comedy, with Ernest Hamm
- 1877: Les Cris-Cris de Paris, comedy
- 1878: Minuit moins cinq !, vaudeville, with Victor Bernard
- 1879: L'Assommoir pour rire, vaudeville
- 1880: Théâtre de famille, operetta with Gustave Nadaud, with Eugène Verconsin
- 1880: Les Deux chambres, operetta
- 1881: Madame Grégoire, operetta, with Paul Burani
- 1883: L'Heure du berger, vaudeville
- 1883: Le Réveil de Vénus, comedy, with Paul Burani, with Henri Cermoise
- 1883: Les Parisiens en province, comedy with Hippolyte Raymond
- 1885: L'Ablette, comedy
- 1885: Les Petites Godin, vaudeville
- 1885: Mon oncle!, comédie-bouffe, with Paul Burani
- 1885: Cherchons papa, vaudeville, with Victor Bernard
- 1886: Serment d'amour, opéra comique, with Edmond Audran
- 1887: La Princesse Colombine, opéra comique, with Émile André
- 1887: La Fiancée des verts poteaux, opéra comique, with Edmond Audran
- 1887: Durand & Durand, vaudeville
- 1887: Maître Corbeau, comedy, with Hippolyte Raymond
- 1888: La Poupée, opéra comique after Ernst Theodor Amadeus Hoffmann, with Edmond Audran
- 1888: Monsieur Coq-Héron l'avoué, comedy, with Paul Siraudin, with Alfred Delacour, Hippolyte Raymond and Lambert-Thiboust,
- 1891: L'oncle Célestin, opérette bouffe, with Edmond Audran and Henri Kéroul
- 1891: La Petite Poucette, vaudeville-opérette, with Maurice Hennequin and Raoul Pugno
- 1891: Les Boulinard, operetta
- 1892: La Femme du commissaire, vaudeville
- 1892: La Plantation Thomassin, vaudeville, with Albert Vizentini
- 1893: Mademoiselle ma femme, opéra comique, with Frédéric Toulmouche, libretto cosigned with Octave Pradels
- 1893: Madame Suzette, operetta, with André Sylvane and Edmond Audran
- 1893: Cousin-cousine, operetta, with Henri Kéroul, with Gaston Serpette
- 1894: La Vertu de Lolotte, comedy
- 1895: L'Article 214, comedy, with André Sylvane
- 1895: La Marraine de Charley, comédie-bouffe, with Brandon Thomas
- 1895: Au coin du feu, operetta
- 1895: La St-Valentin, opéra comique
- 1895: La Perle du Cantal, operetta
- 1895: Le Pèlerinage, comedy, with Maxime Boucheron
- 1896: La falote, opérette, with Louis Varney and Armand Liorat
- 1896: Paris quand même ! ou Les deux bigorret, comédie-bouffe, with Ernest Grenet-Dancourt
- 1897: Niobé, opérette, with Harry Paulton
- 1897: L'Auberge du Tohu-Bohu, vaudeville-opérette
- 1899: Les Sœurs Gaudichard, opéra comique
- 1899: Les Saltimbanques, opérette, with Louis Ganne
- 1899: Les Sœurs Gaudichard, opéra comique, with Edmond Audran
- 1899: Le Curé Vincent, operetta
- 1902: Madame Sherry, operetta, with Hugo Felix
- 1902: Le Jockey malgré lui, opéra-bouffe, with Paul Gavault
- 1902: L'Étude Tocasson, vaudeville, with Albin Valabrègue
- 1903: Le Voyage des Berluron, vaudeville, with Ernest Grenet-Dancourt and Henri Kéroul
- 1904: Les Hirondelles, operetta, with Henri Hirschmann
- 1905: Les Filles Jackson et cie, operetta, with Justin Clérice
- 1905: Une affaire scandaleuse, vaudeville, with Paul Gavault
- 1910: La D’moiselle du Tabarin, operetta, with André Alexandre
- 1911: Helda, operetta, with Auguste M. Fechner, Tom de Godement and Michel Farlane
- 1911: La Marquise de Chicago, operetta
- 1912: Trois amoureuses, operetta
- 1913: La Petite Manon, opéra comique, with André Heuzé and Henri Hirschmann
- 1913: Éva, comédie, with Alfred Maria Willner, with Robert Bodanzky
- 1913: Le Roi des montagnes, opéra comique
- 1915: La Cocarde de Mimi-Pinson, operetta, with Henri Goublier
- 1916: La Demoiselle du printemps, operetta, with Henri Goublier fils, Francis Gally and Georges Léglise
