= Pierre Trimouillat =

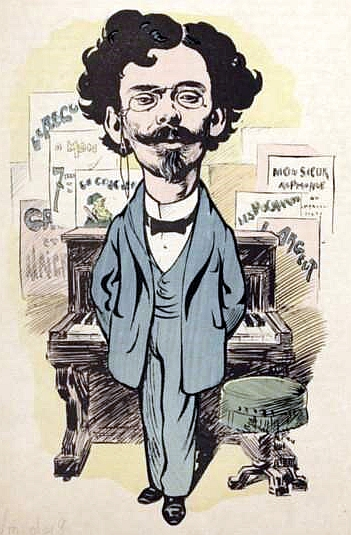
- Pierre Trimouillat by Fernand Fau
- Born: 1858; Moulins, Allier, France
- Died: 5 January 1929 (aged 70–71); Paris, France
- Occupations: Singer and comedian

Pierre Trimouillat (1858 – 5 January 1929) was a French songwriter, comedian and singer who was active in the cabarets of Paris in the 1890s.

== Life ==
Pierre Trimouillat was born in Moulins, Allier, in 1858. He obtained a job as an official in the Prefecture of the Seine. He appeared at Le Chat Noir by 1891, an important step in gaining recognition in the Parisian cabaret scene. He contributed to the Chat Noir journal. He often attended the soirées of La Plume, the literary and artistic review set up in 1889 by Léon Deschamps. He published comic verses in this journal.

Trimouillat proposed to the owner of the Procope to establish a cabaret on the first floor called Le Gringoire. Performers included Paul Delmet, Eugène Lemercier, Vincent Hyspa, Gabriel de Lautrec, Yan Nibor and Marcel Legay. A satirical paper, Le Gringoire, was based on these soirées and published between November 1893 and July 1894. The soirées at the Gringoire were soon replaced by soirées at the Procope that Trimouillat organized with Xavier Privas and Gaston Dumestre.

In the 1890s Trimouillat belonged to the "Gardenia" dramatic circle that Paul Fabre had founded in 1887. For a long time he was one of the main performers at Le Chat Noir, where his thin voice would draw laughter from the audience. He also performed at many other venues including the Feuille de Vigne, Nouvelle Athènes, Paradis Latin, La Presse, Goguette, Quat'Z'arts, Procope, Caveau, Noctambules, Lice chansonnière, Bon Bock, Arts et Lettres, Caméléon, Chanson de Paris, Conservatoire de Montmartre, Chien Noir, cabaret de la Veine, Truie qui file, Carillon and Chat Botté.

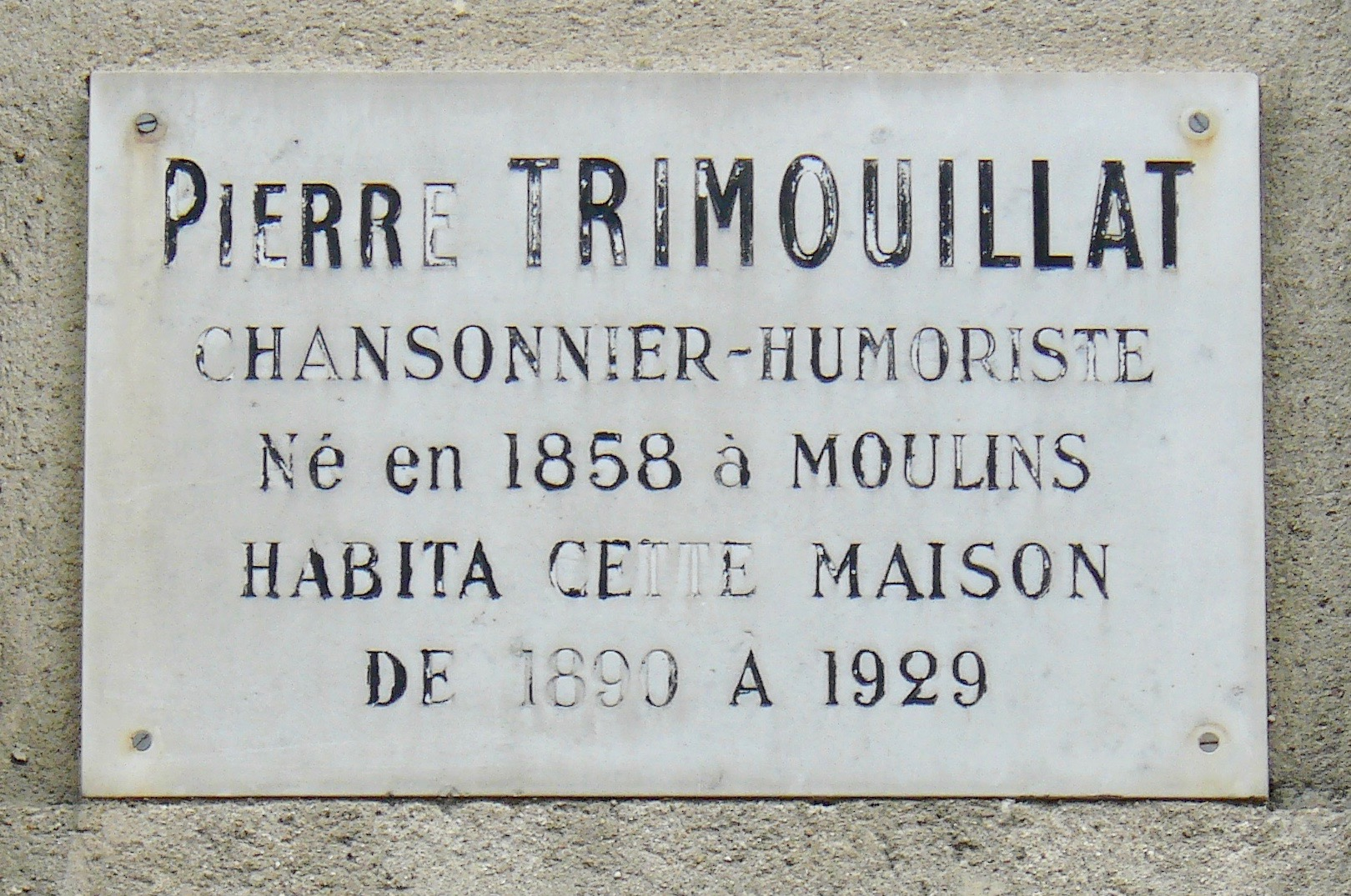
Plaque at 10, rue Chanoinesse

An 1899 reviewer said of his work that his modernist poems included elements derived from the 17th century work of Molière. He had a mischievous and caustic wit. Starting in the early 1900s Trimouillat stopped performing apart from short appearances for charity. Trimouillat died in 1929. He lived at 10, rue Chanoinesse from 1890 to 1929. His home is commemorated by a plaque.

== Selected works ==
- À trois pas, monolog in verse, Paris : Tresse et Stock, 1886, in-16, 9 p.
- L'Araignée, monolog in verse, Paris : Tresse et Stock, 1886, in-16, 9 p.
- Le Bandeau, monolog in verse, Paris : Tresse et Stock, 1886, in-16, 8 p.
- Le Bègue, monolog in free verse, Paris : Tresse et Stock, 1886, in-16, 10 p.
- La Corde, monolog in verse, Paris : Tresse et Stock, 1886, in-16, 10 p.
- Le Faux nez, monolog, Paris : Tresse et Stock, 1886, in-16, 13 p.
- Lettre-close, scène in verse, Paris : Tresse et Stock, 1886, in-16, 10 p.
- L'Octroi, poems, Paris : Tresse et Stock, 1886, in-16, 9 p.
- Le Vengeur, monolog, Paris : Tresse et Stock, 1886, in-16, 10 p.
- L'Argent, rhyming fantasy, Paris : P. Ollendorff, 1887, in-16, 16 p.
- Gras et maigres, comic monolog, Paris : P. Franck, 1889, in-16, 4 p.
- Œuvres de Pierre Trimouillat, ballades, chansons, fantaisies, monologs, parodies, poèmes divers, sous le patronage de Maurice Donnay, Edmond Haraucourt, Charles Léandre, preface by Jacques Ferny, postface by Alcanter de Brahm, Paris : Stock, Delamain et Boutelleau, 1931, in-16, 280 p.

== Sources ==
- Dautriat, Alain (1999). Sur les murs de Paris: guide des plaques commémoratives. Inventaire. ISBN 978-2-910490-20-1.
- Deschamps, Léon (1891). La Plume.
- Mendès, Catulle (1903). Le mouvement poétique français de 1867 à 1900. Slatkine. ISBN 978-2-05-101274-4.
- Picq, G. (2014). "Trimouillat, Pierre". Les Commérages De Tybalt.
- Segel, Harold B. (1987). Turn-of-the-century Cabaret: Paris, Barcelona, Berlin, Munich, Vienna, Cracow, Moscow, St. Petersburg, Zurich. Columbia University Press. p. 30. ISBN 978-0-231-05128-6.
- Whiting, Steven Moore (1999-02-18). Satie the Bohemian : From Cabaret to Concert Hall: From Cabaret to Concert Hall. Clarendon Press. ISBN 978-0-19-158452-7.
