= Jose Levy =

English theatre practitioner (1884–1936)

Juan Jose G. Levy (Portsmouth, 29 June 1884 - 6 October 1936) was an English theatre practitioner who attempted to import the ghoulish and grisly Grand Guignol aesthetic for London audiences.

Levy was born in Portsmouth, England and educated at the Ecole de Commerce, Lausanne.

He wrote a number of plays between 1908 and 1925. In 1920, Levy opened the Grand Guignol theatre in the Little Theatre located in the London's Strand District. Levy's productions featured performances by the English stage actress Sybil Thorndike, who would eventually originate the role of Joan of Arc in George Bernard Shaw's Saint Joan. During its inaugural season, Levy's company staged such notorious thrillers as Andre de Lorde's The Hand of Death.

The Grand Guignol experiment ended in 1922 when Levy met with interference from England's censorious Lord Chamberlain's Department. Upon announcing its demise, Levy stated that "the reason I am finishing with Grand Guignol is the too rigid censorship... it is impossible to carry on while the Lord Chamberlain's Department raises so many difficulties."

In March 1934 Levy received the Légion d'honneur for recognition of his contributions to French drama and theatre in England.

In an obituary published on 10 October 1936 in The Times, James Agate praised Levy’s passion for the theatre. He wrote that "unlike many theatre managers, (Levy) was intensely interested in theatre. The fact that managing a theatre was his business never destroyed his love for the drama as an art."
