= Paul Alexis =

French novelist, dramatist, and journalist

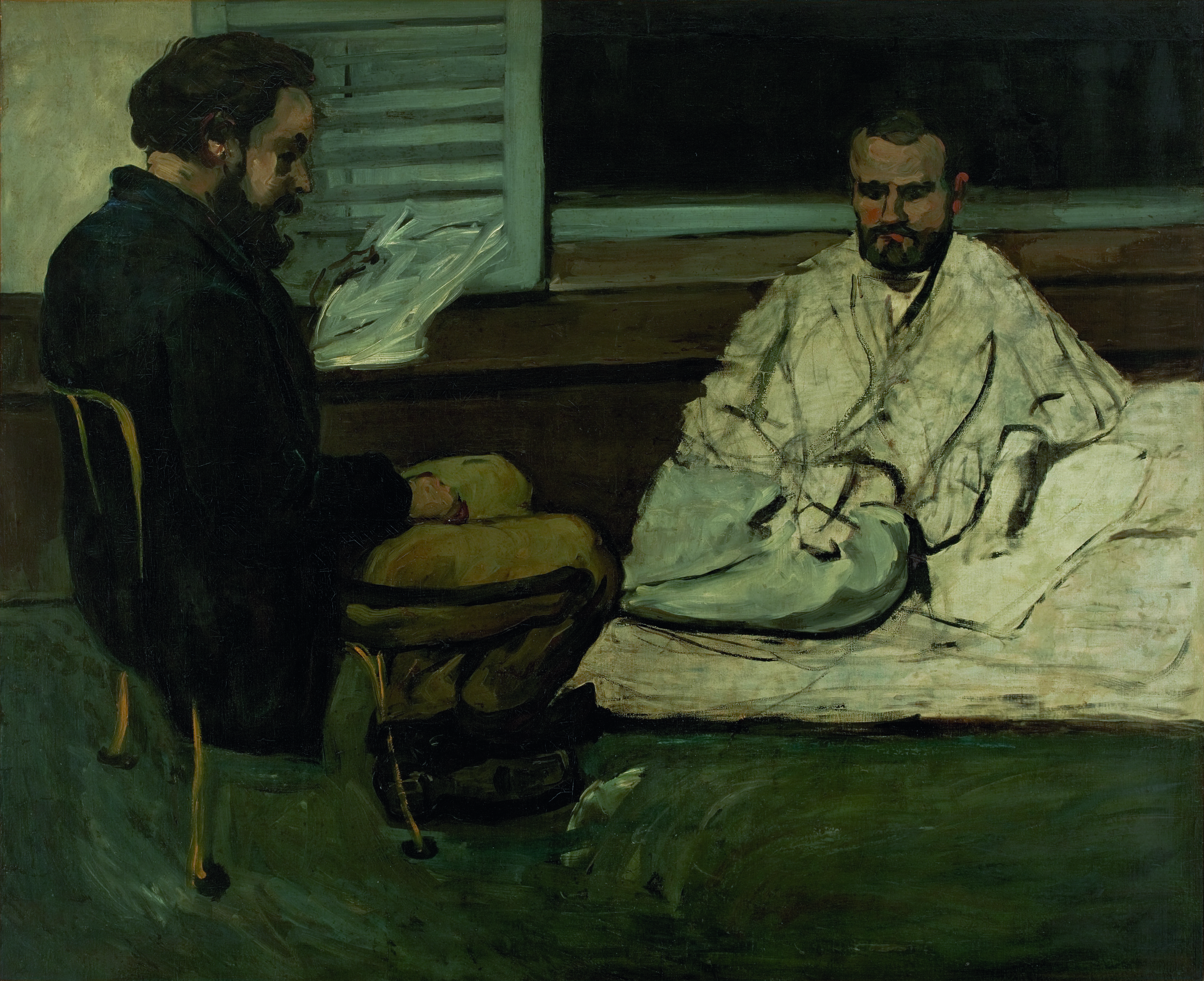
Paul Cézanne, Paul Alexis reading to Zola, (1869–70)

Antoine Joseph Paul Alexis (16 June 1847 – 28 July 1901) was a French novelist, dramatist, and journalist. He is best remembered today as the friend and biographer of Émile Zola.

== Life ==
Alexis was born at Aix-en-Provence. He attended the Collège Bourbon where he first learned of Zola, who was himself a graduate. At the direction of his parents he studied law at the University of Aix, but he longed for the life of a writer, and finally left Aix-en-Provence for Paris. He arrived in the capital in 1869 where he quickly became acquainted with Zola and his family. He contributed articles to a number of newspapers including L'Avenir national, La Cloche, Le Corsaire, Le Cri du peuple (under the pseudonym Trublot), Gil Blas,, Le Journal, La Réforme, Le Recueil, and Le Voltaire. He wrote novels in the naturalist style as well as several plays, some of which were written in collaboration with Oscar Méténier.

In 1875, he was briefly incarcerated on the mistaken suspicion of being a Communard who as such would have faced the prospect of life in prison, but Zola was able to use his influence to have him released.

Along with J.-K. Huysmans, Henri Céard, Guy de Maupassant, Léon Hennique, and Zola, he formed part of the groupe des Médan which was responsible for publishing Les Soirées de Médan in 1880, a collection of six naturalist stories dealing with the Franco-Prussian War. Alexis' contribution was the story Après la bataille ("After the Battle").

Alexis was also a great admirer of Flaubert and friend to Renoir. Céard called him "Zola's shadow". Cézanne painted a portrait of them together entitled Paul Alexis reading to Zola.

He married Marie-Louise Virginie Monnier, from Normandy, in 1883. After his wife died of typhoid fever in 1900, he sank into alcoholism and eventually succumbed to an aneurysm, dying at Levallois-Perret. He was survived by two daughters, Paule and Marthe.

== Quotes ==
- "Naturalism (is) not dead." ("Naturalisme pas mort.")

On Zola:

- "He is as ambitious and domineering in the intellectual realm as he is soft and conciliatory in every other."
- "He yields points grudgingly and never on the spot. Not being right causes him intense pain. So deeply rooted is this rivalrous spirit that it will seize the most trivial pretext to manifest itself. Thus, I have sometimes played chess with him and won. He confesses that, momentarily, his defeat irks him as much as if someone denied him literary talent."
- "If only you knew all that I owe this man! What would I be today without him? I have no doubt that the little bit of notoriety I and a few others enjoy is a spark from the blaze this extraordinary man has created around himself! Reviled, misunderstood, ignored, he fought the good fight all alone and suffered the anguish of it . . . whilst we, like young men of means who will inherit a fortune they didn't earn, all we had to do was show up. Even before we've sowed, we've harvested!"

== Works ==
=== Novels ===
- Après la bataille (as part of Les Soirées de Médan) (1880)
- Un amour platonique (1880) translated as A Platonic Love by Richard Robinson, Sunny Lou Publishing Company, 2021.
- La Fin de Lucie Pellegrin (1880) translated as The End of Lucie Pellegrin by Richard Robinson for Snuggly Books in 2020
- L'Infortune de monsieur Fraque (1880) translated as The Misfortune of Monsieur Fraque by Richard Robinson, Sunny Lou Publishing, 2021
- Les Femmes du père Lefèvre (1880)
- Le Besoin d'aimer (1885)
- Le Collage (1883)
- L'Education amoureuse (1890)
- Madame Meuriot, mœurs parisiennes (1890)
- Trente romans; Le cœur; La chair; L'esprit (1895)
- La Comtesse. Treize symboles. Quelques originaux (1897)
- Le Collage (1899)
- Vallobra (1901)

=== Drama ===
- Celle qu'on n'épouse pas (1879)
- La Fin de Lucie Pellegrin (1888)
- Les Frères Zemganno (1890)
- Monsieur Betsy (1890)
- Charles Demailly (1892)
- La Provinciale (1893)

=== Letters and Memoirs ===
- Émile Zola : notes d'un ami (1882)
- «Naturalisme pas mort» : lettres inédites de Paul Alexis à Émile Zola, 1871-1900 (1971)
