= Eugène Verconsin =

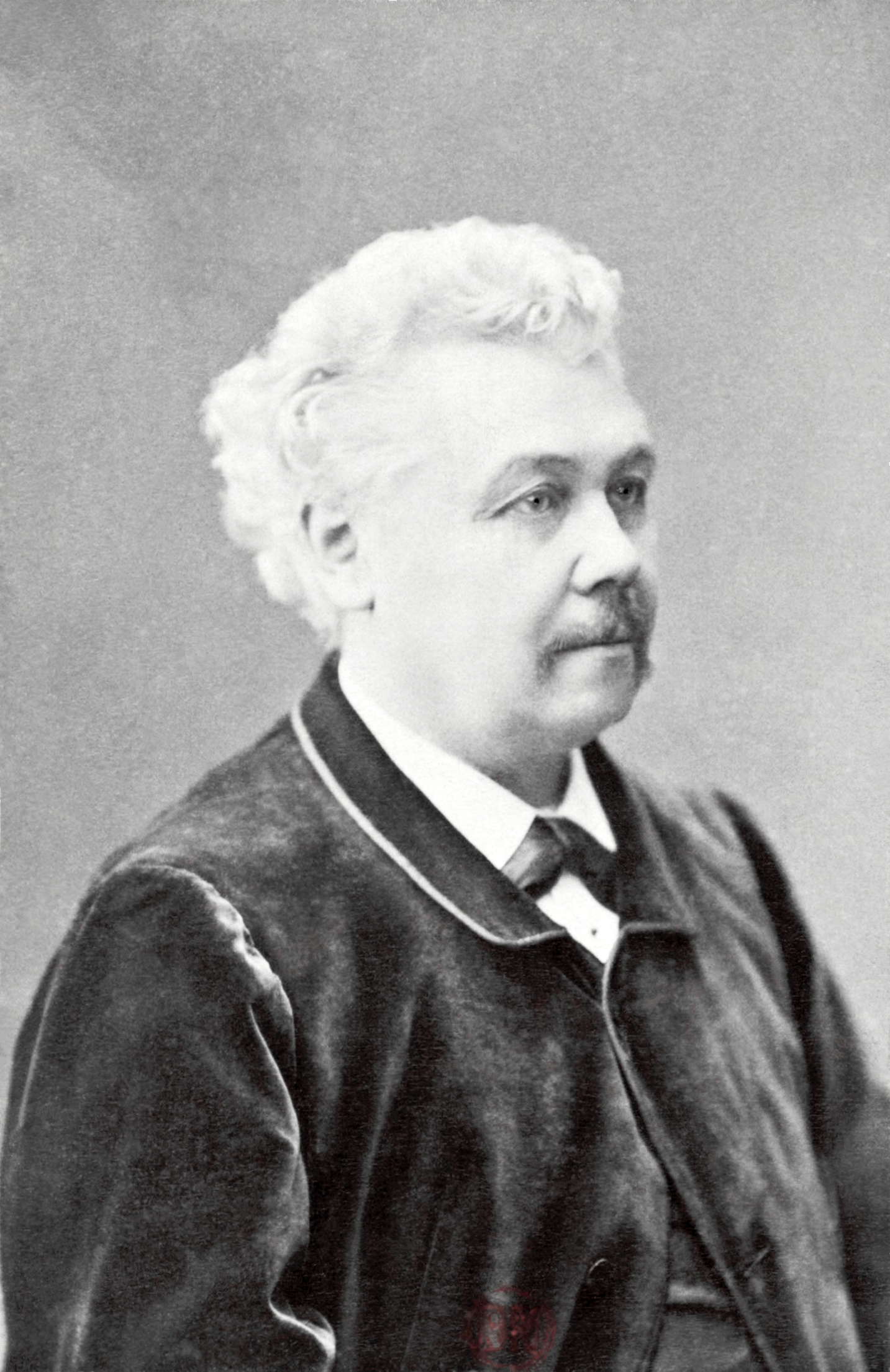
- photo by Nadar
- Born: Pierre-Frédéric-Eugène Verconsin; 19 May 1823; Paris
- Died: 28 December 1891 (aged 68); Paris
- Occupation: Playwright

Eugène Verconsin (19 May 1823 - 28 December 1891) was a French playwright, author of twenty something comedies and vaudevilles.

== Plays ==
- 1850 : Les Roués innocents, 1-act comedy mixed with songs by Lefranc and Verconsin, performed in Paris, Théâtre Montansier, 16 August
- 1857 : Télémaque, ou l'Innocence en danger sauvée par l'intrépide résolution d'un vieillard qui ne craignait pas l'eau froide, Greek burlesque tragedy at the time of the Trojan War, by Eugène Verconsin. Premiered on 30 April 1857 at Paris
- 1861 : Une dette de jeunesse, comedy in 1 act, in prose, by Eugène Verconsin and Eugène Lesbazeilles, Paris, Théâtre du Gymnase, 10 October
- 1863 : C'était Gertrude ! 1-act comedy-vaudeville, by M. Eugène Verconsin. Paris, played on 28 June 1863
- 1864 : En wagon épisode de Voyage, vaudeville in one act
- 1864 : Les Erreurs de Jean, comédie-vaudeville in 1 act, played in Paris, on 31 October 1864
- 1869 : Saynètes Et Comédies
- 1869 : Les Rêves de Marguerite, 1-act comedy
- 1870 : La matrone d'Éphèse: 1-act comedy
- 1870 : Les Curiosités de Jeanne, comedy-vaudeville in 1 act performed in Paris, on 24 January 1870
- 1870 : Adélaïde et Vermouth, military romance and vaudeville in one act
- 1875 : À La Porte, 1-act comedy
- 1875 : Quête à domicile, 1-act comedy
- 1875 : Ici, Médor ! 1-act comedy played in Paris, at the théâtre du Palais-Royal on 3 July 1875
- 1876 : La Crise de M. Thomassin, comedy in 3 acts, played in Paris, at the théâtre du Gymnase, on 31 July 1876
- 1878 : Théâtre de campagne by Eugène Verconsin and André Theuriet
- 1880 : Théâtre des familles, by Gustave Nadaud, Maurice Ordonneau and Eugène Verconsin
- 1884 : L'Une, ou l'autre ?, saynète in 1 act
- 1885 : La Folle du logis, monologue
- 1886 : La Sortie de Saint-Cyr, comedy in 1 act, played in Paris, at the Théâtre-Français, on 22 June 1886
- 1890 : Fais Ce Que Dois comedy
- undated : Les Trois souhaits, comedy

In 1888, Eugène Verconsin foreworded a book by the author Aylic Marin, pen name of Édouard Petit who had written: En Océanie, published by éditions Charles Bayle, in the Petite bibliotheque populaire collection.
