= Max Maurey =

French playwright

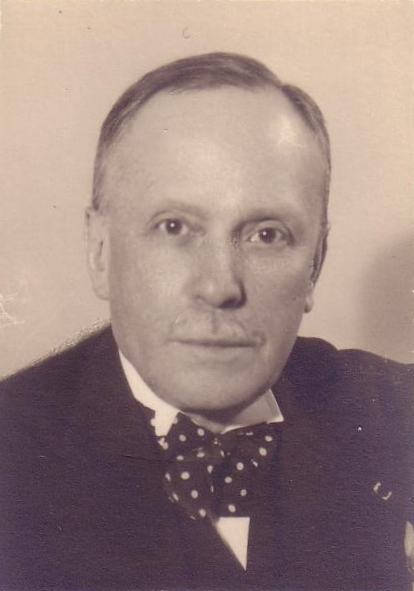
- Portrait of Max Maurey.
- Born: 1866; Paris
- Died: 1947 (aged 80–81); Neuilly-sur-Seine
- Occupations: Playwright, theatre manager

Max Maurey was a French playwright born in Paris in 1866 and died in Neuilly-sur-Seine in 1947. He was also the theatre manager of the Théâtre des Variétés from 1914 to 1940 and from 1944 to 1947, and director of the Théâtre du Grand Guignol from 1898 to 1914.

== Biographical notes ==
He was an engineer, graduated from the École des mines and the École centrale des Arts et Manufactures. In 1897, he became managing director of the Théâtre du Grand-Guignol, a venue for which he wrote L'Atroce Volupté in collaboration with Georges Neveux.

In 1914, he became director of the Théâtre des Variétés and would remain in that position until his death. On 9 October 1928, Topaze by Marcel Pagnol was premiered at the Théâtre des Variétés (with André Lefaur, Pauley, Pierre Larquey and Marcel Vallée in the main roles) and was met with great success

In 1935, he was best man at the marriage of Sacha Guitry and Jacqueline Delubac.

He died in Neuilly-sur-Seine in 1947.

He had three children:

- Monique Maurey (1907–1998), who married Max Hymans,
- Denis Maurey (1910–1984),
- Marcel Maurey (1914–2003).

== Distinctions ==
- Commandeur of the Legion of Honour
- Honorary President of the Union of Parisian theaters directors.
- An avenue of Antibes, located at the entrance of the Cap bears his name, not far from the avenue Henri Duvernois who was a close friend.
