= L'Atroce Volupté =

Drama in Paris by Georges Neveux & Max Maurey

L'Atroce Volupté is a drama in two acts by Georges Neveux and Max Maurey, premiered at the Théâtre des Deux-Masques in Paris on 14 March 1919.

== Characters ==
- Djana, headmistress, Paula Maxa
- de Sombreuse, her husband, Vermoyal
- Robert, Djana's lover, Georges Paulais
- Jeanne, housemaid, Rosenne
- The nurse, Dannecy
- Doctor Brémond, Henriet
- Professor Ternier, Diener

== Sources ==
- Agnès Pierron, Grand Guignol, le théâtre des peurs de la Belle Époque, éd. Robert Laffont
