= Charles Émile Egli =

French painter

- Born: 30 March 1877; Aigle, Switzerland
- Died: 9 November 1937 (aged 60); Paris, France
- Occupation: Engraver

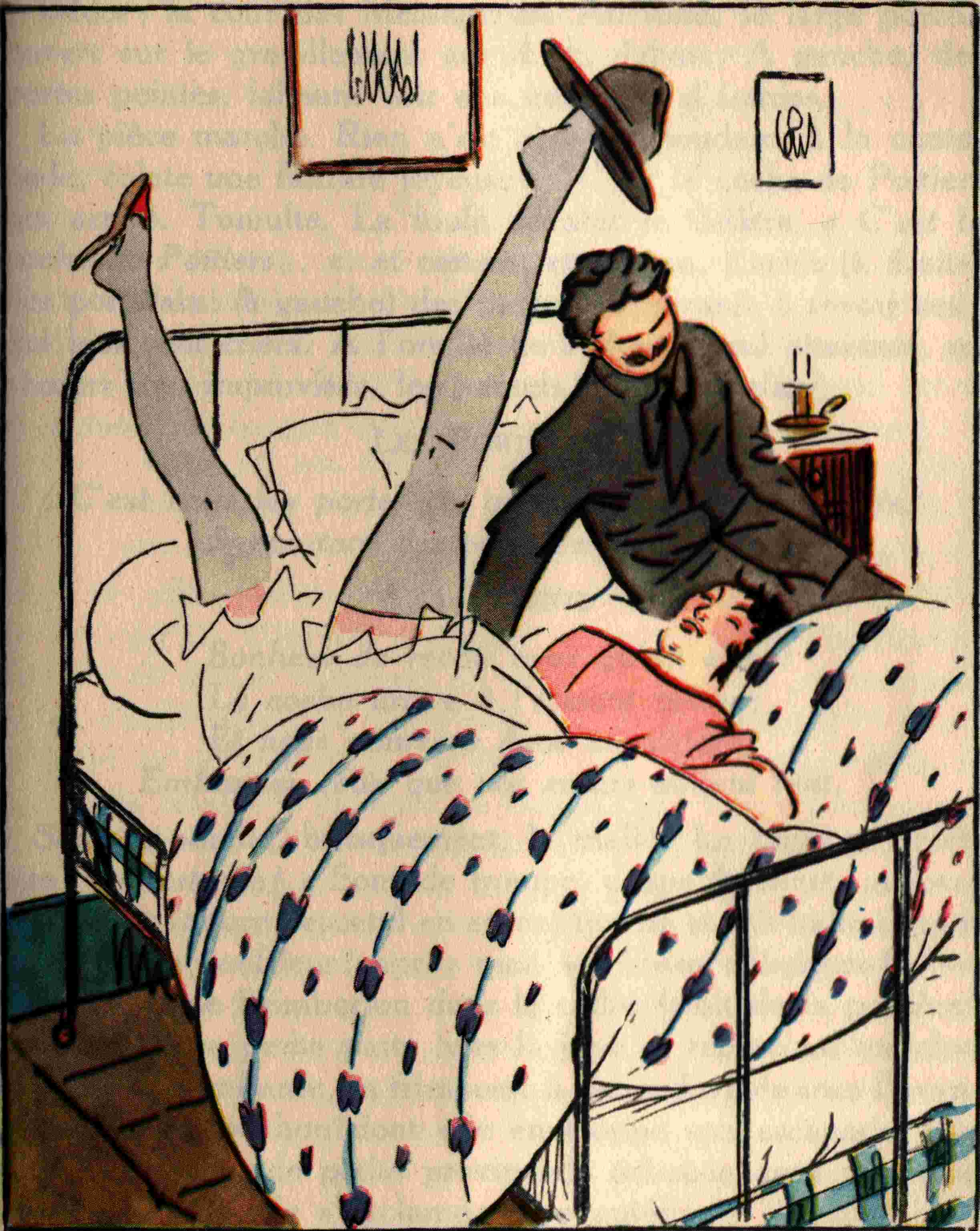
Image-Carlègle - Les Linottes page 0062.jpg

Charles Émile Egli (known as Carlègle; 30 March 1877 – 9 November 1937) was a Swiss-born illustrator and painter who spent most of his life in Paris.

== Biography ==
=== Early years ===
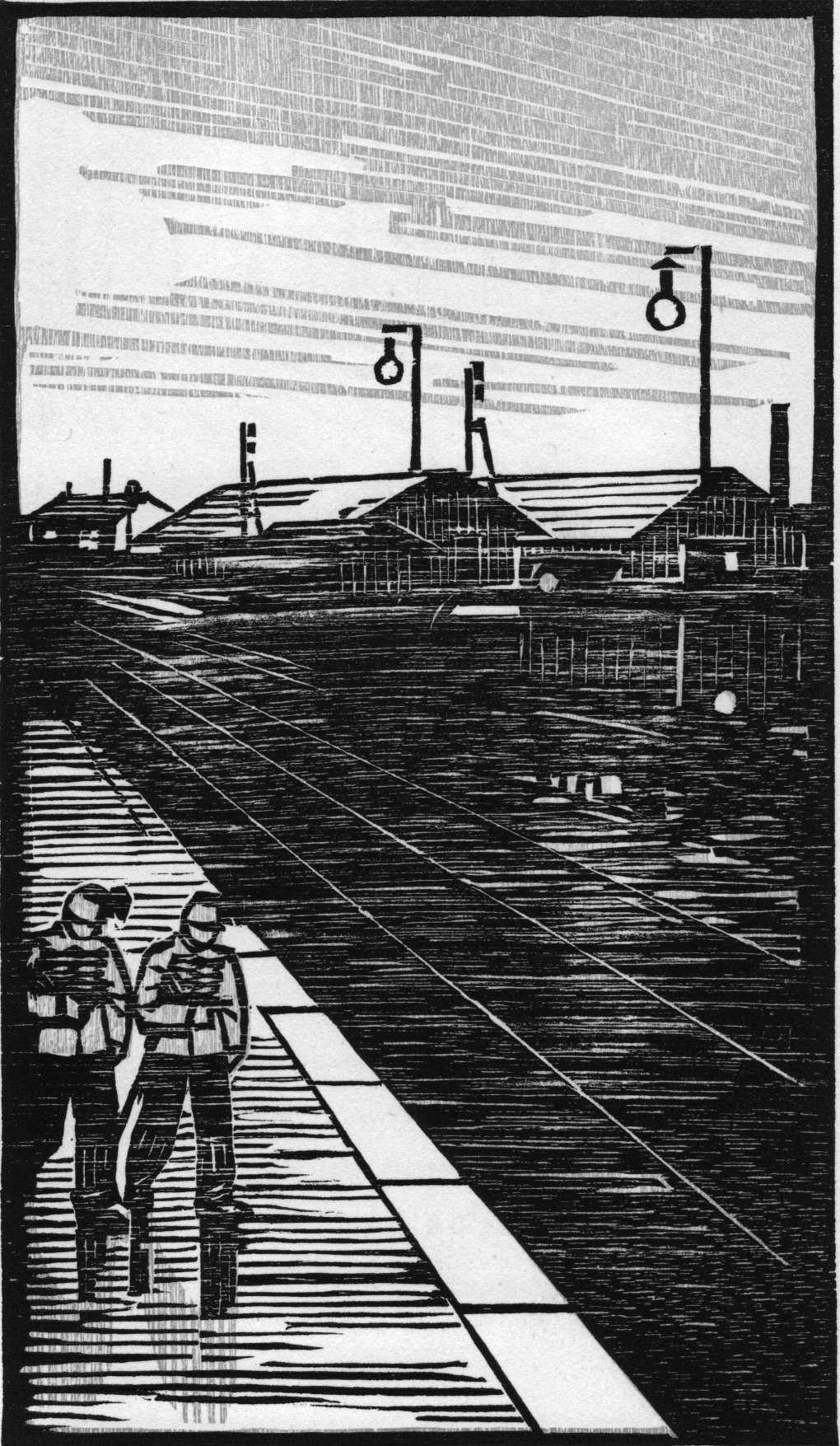
Illustration for Le Train de 8h47 - Frontispice

Charles Émile Egli was born in Aigle, Switzerland on 30 March 1877. He was educated in Aigle and then at the college of Vevey. When he was eighteen he attended engraving classes of Alfred Martin at the school of industrial arts in Geneva. Four year later he moved to Paris, where he stayed the rest of his life. Egli studied at the École des Beaux-Arts.

=== Career ===
Egli adopted the pseudonym of Carlègle. He soon became known in satirical journals like Le Rire, Le Sourire, La Vie Parisienne, L'Assiette au Beurre, Fantasio, La Gazette do Bon Ton, Les Humoristes and Qui lit rit. Egli excelled in wood engraving. His illustrations for Daphnis et Chloé exhibited in the autumn Salon of 1913 launched his career. From then until his death in 1937 he illustrated books by classical and contemporary authors such as Virgil, Paul Valéry, Blaise Pascal, Paul Verlaine, Anatole France and Charles Maurras. He was naturalized in 1927.

=== Death ===
Charles Émile Egli died in Paris on 9 December 1937.

He was the subject of a book by Hugues Delorme published in 1939.

== Selected works ==
Books that Egli illustrated include:

- Carnet d'un Combattant by Paul Tuffrau, Payot - appeared in 1917, under the pseudonym of lieutenant E.R., with 64 pen drawings
- Frontispice in the review L'Encrier, founded by Roger Dévigne in May 1919
- La Petite Fille aux Papillotes, original wood engraving in the review L'Encrier (15 October-15 November 1919)
- Daphnis et Chloé by Longus, chez Pichon in 1919
- Le Train de 8h47 by Georges Courteline, Paris, Société littéraires de France
- Les Linottes by Georges Courteline, Paris, Éditions littéraires de France
- Les Aventures du Roi Pausole by Pierre Louys, first published by Fayard (« Modern Bibliothèque ») in 1908, then with different illustrations by Briffaut in 1924
- Mon Amie Nane by Paul-Jean Toulet, 18 original wood engravings, Paris, Léon Pichon, 1925
- Les Contrerimes by Paul-Jean Toulet, 6 original wood engravings, Brussels, Editions Un Coup de Dés, 1927
- Lysistrata d'Aristophane, Paris, Éditions Briffaut, 1928
- Maxime de Duvernois, Babou, 1929
- Le Sopha de Crébillon, Mornay, 1933
- Nudité de Colette, La Mappemonde, 1943 (posthumous)
- L'Arlequin aux Jacinthes by Maurice Venoize, Boivin et Cie, undated

== Engravings from Les Linottes ==
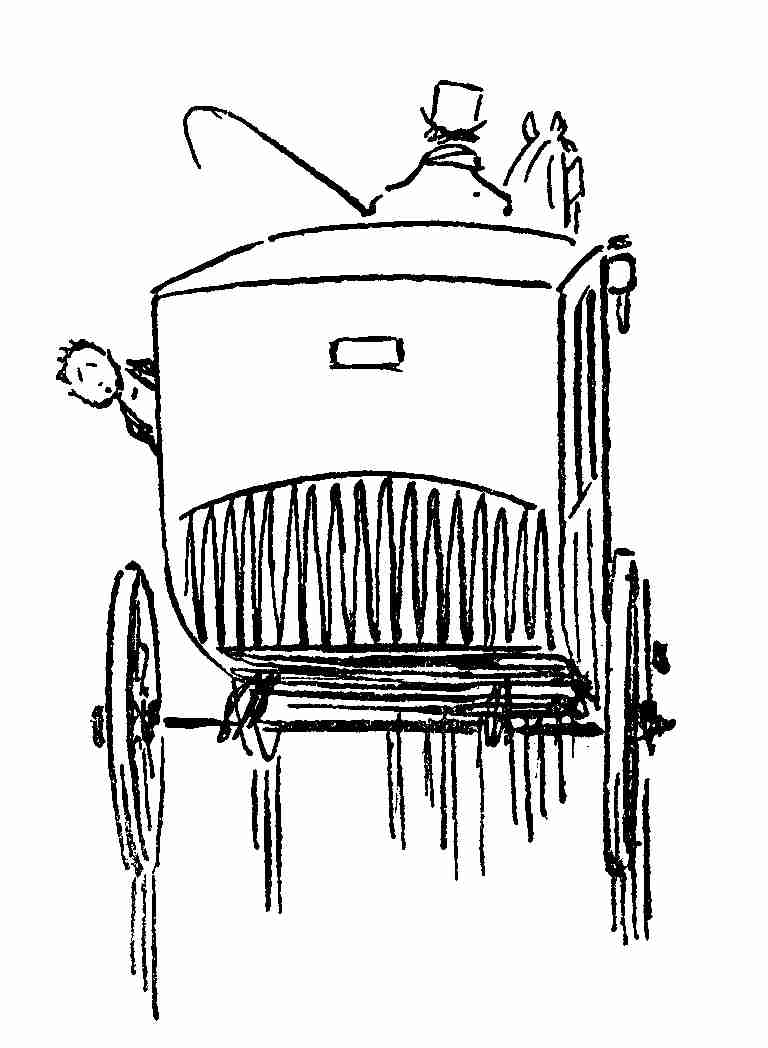

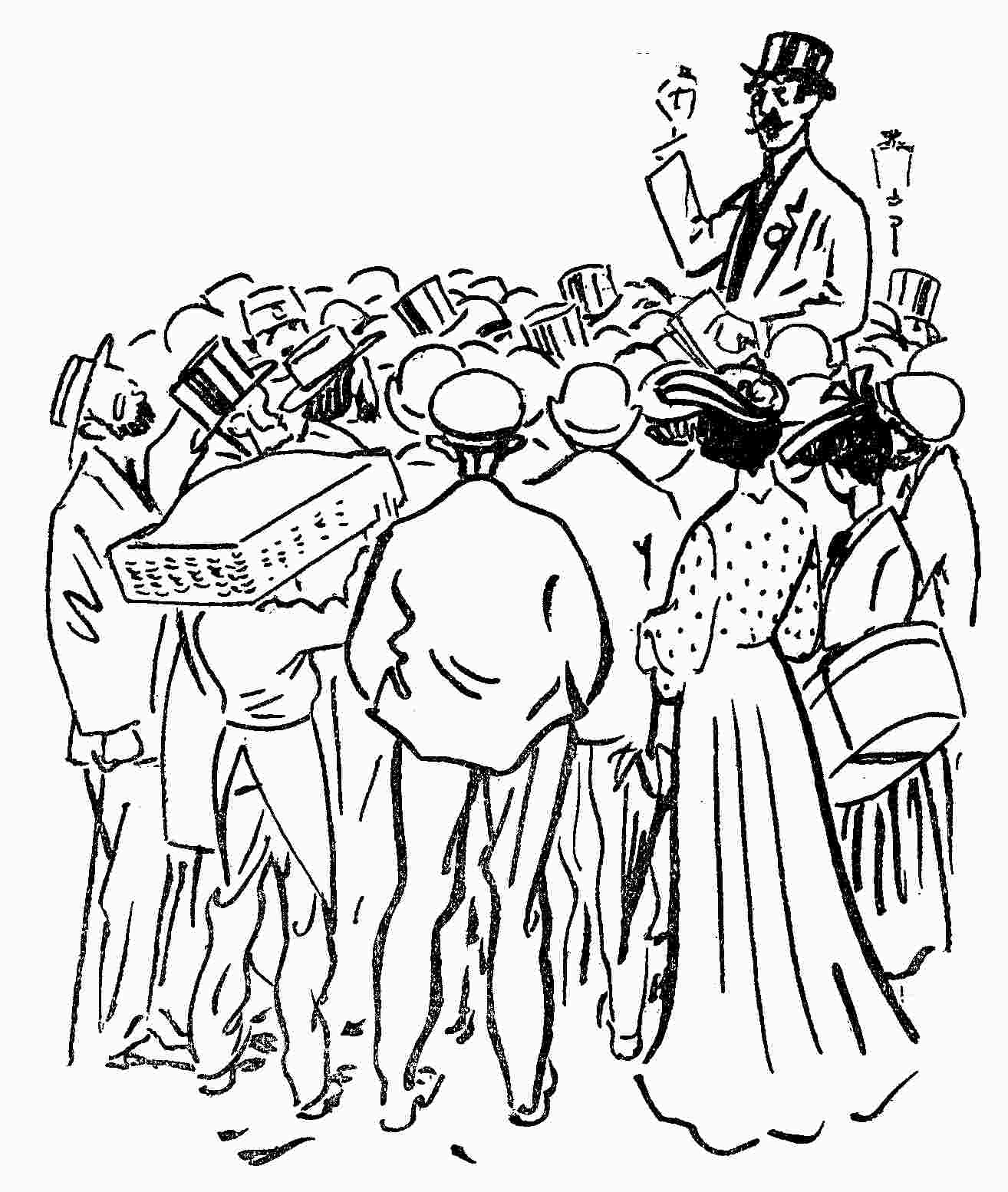

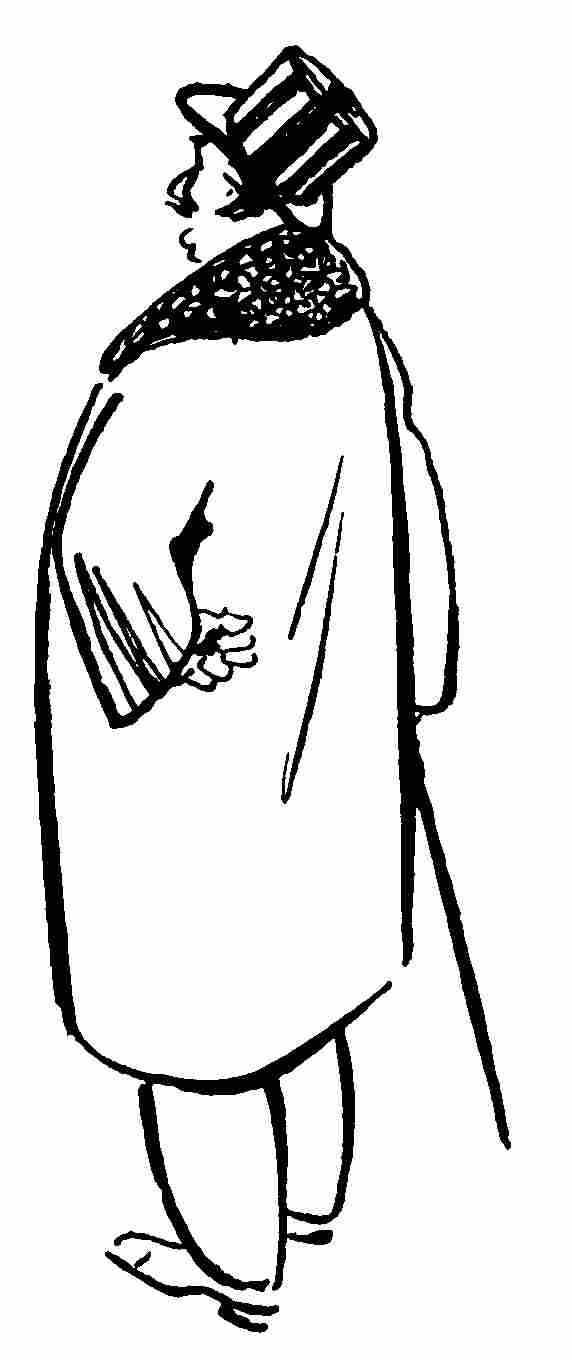

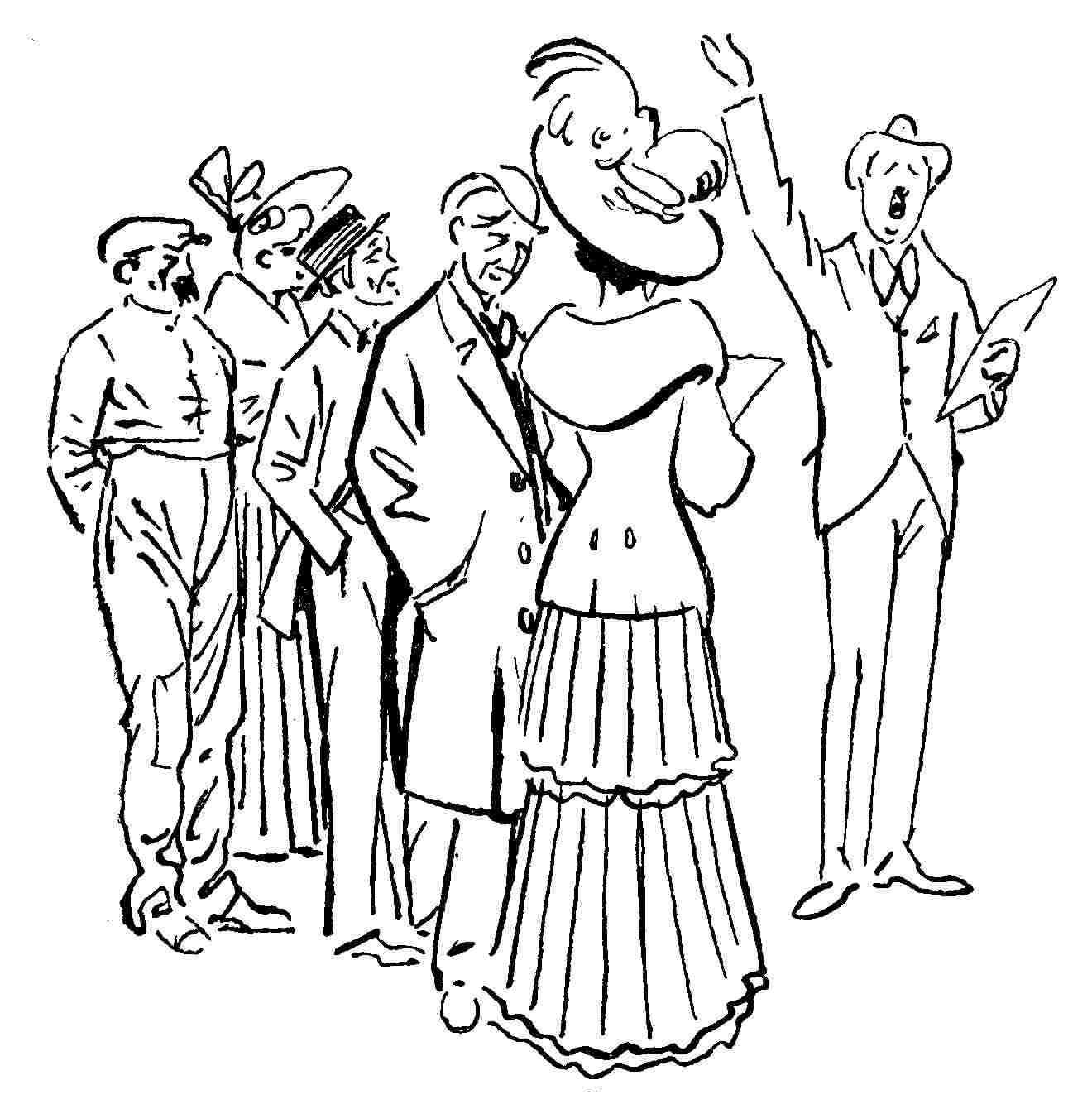

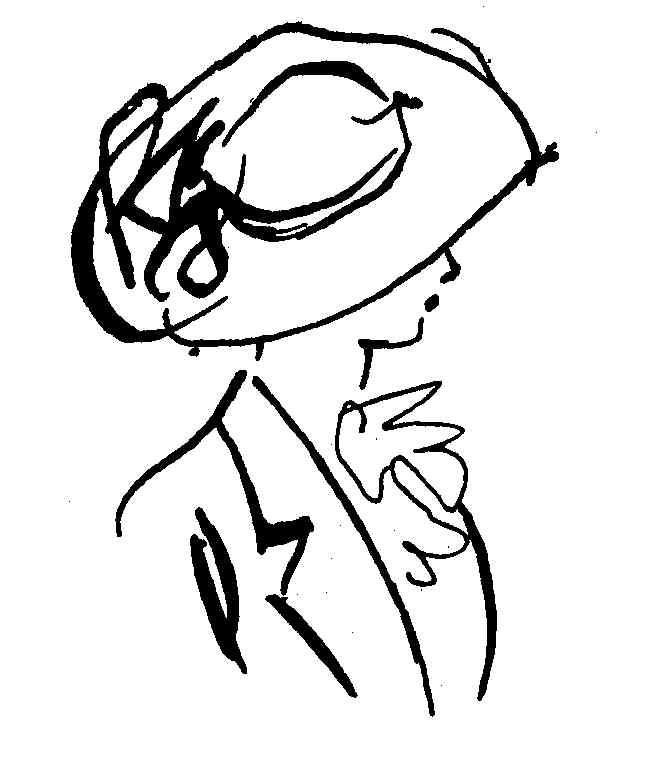

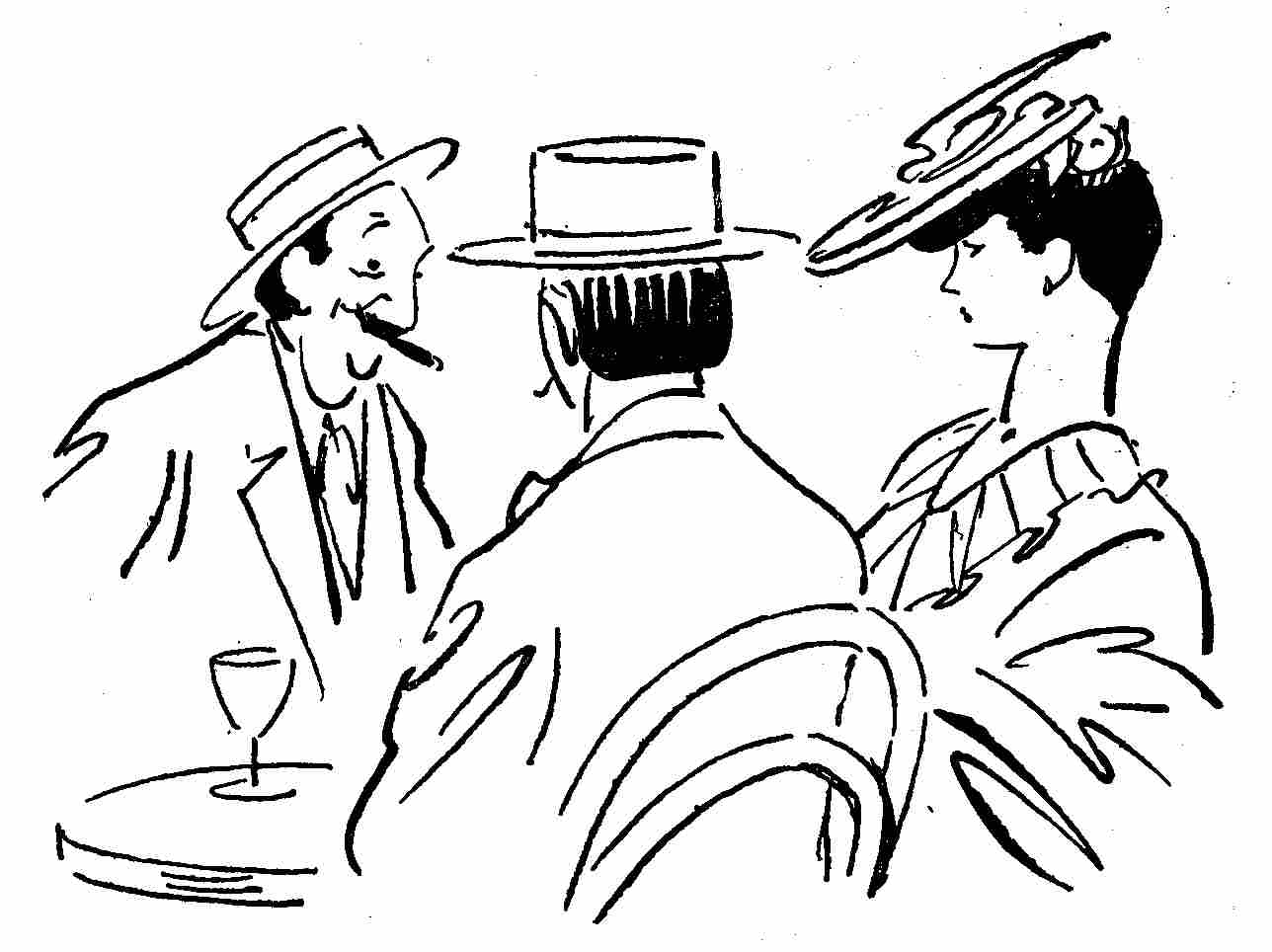

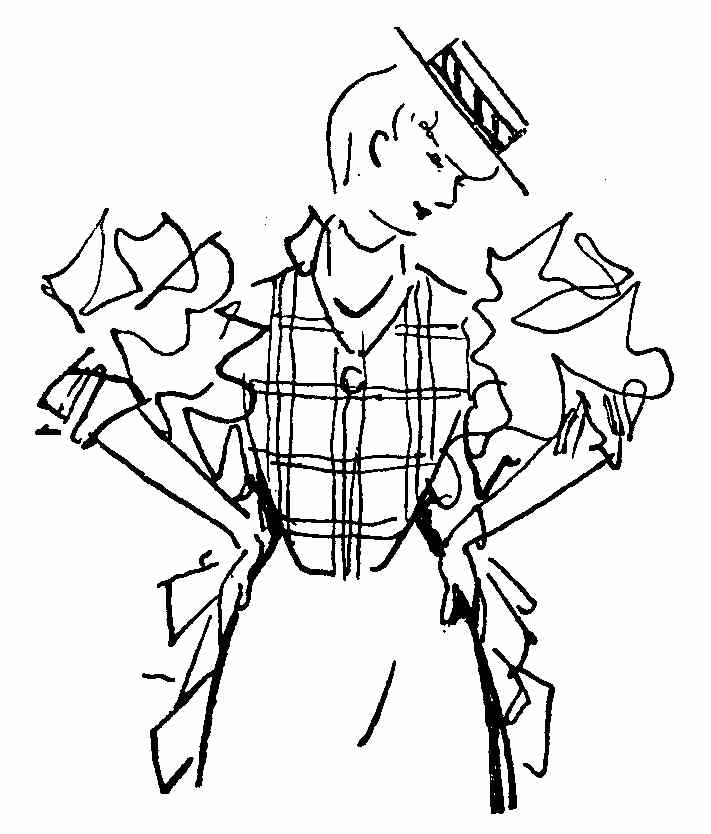

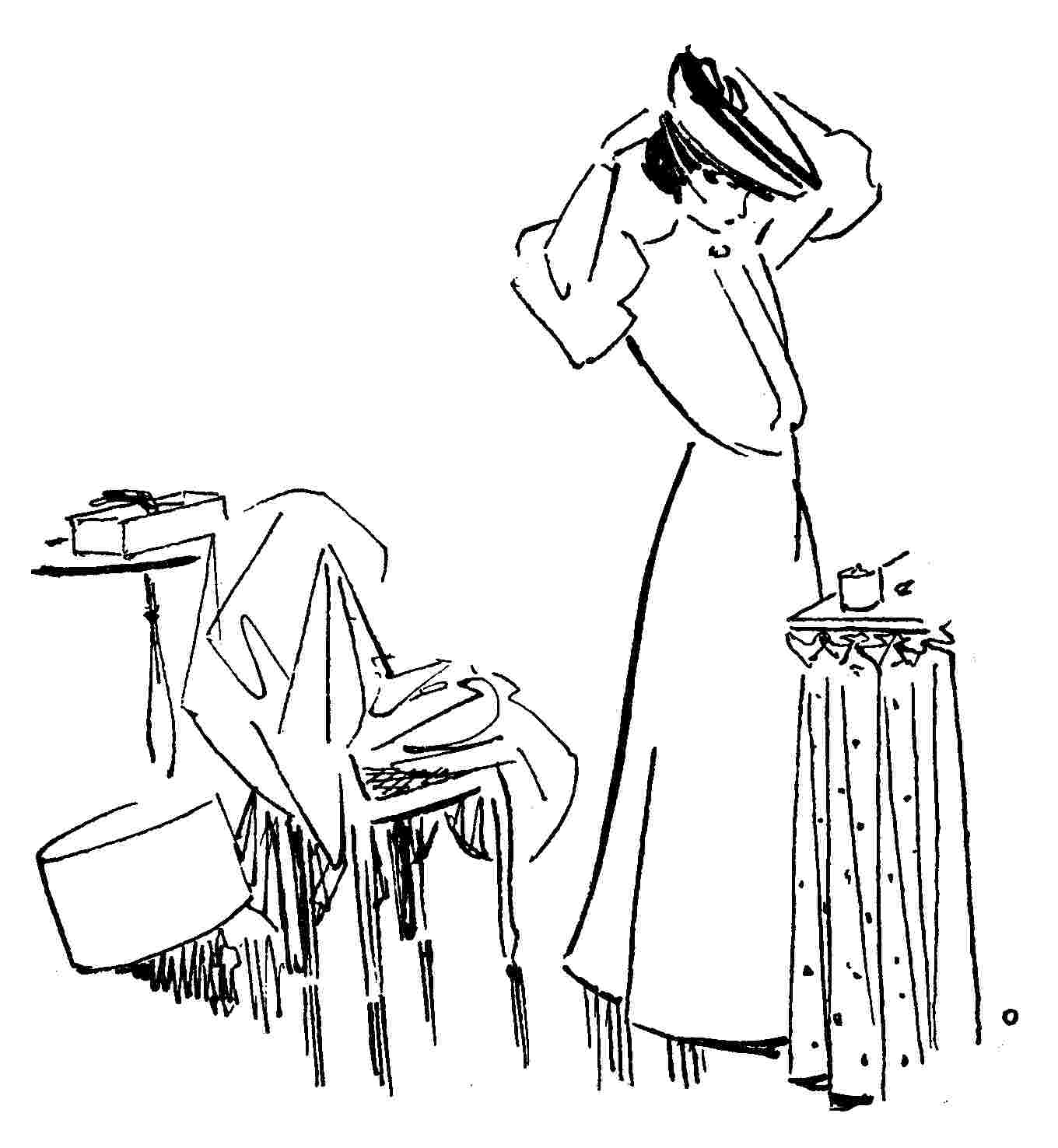

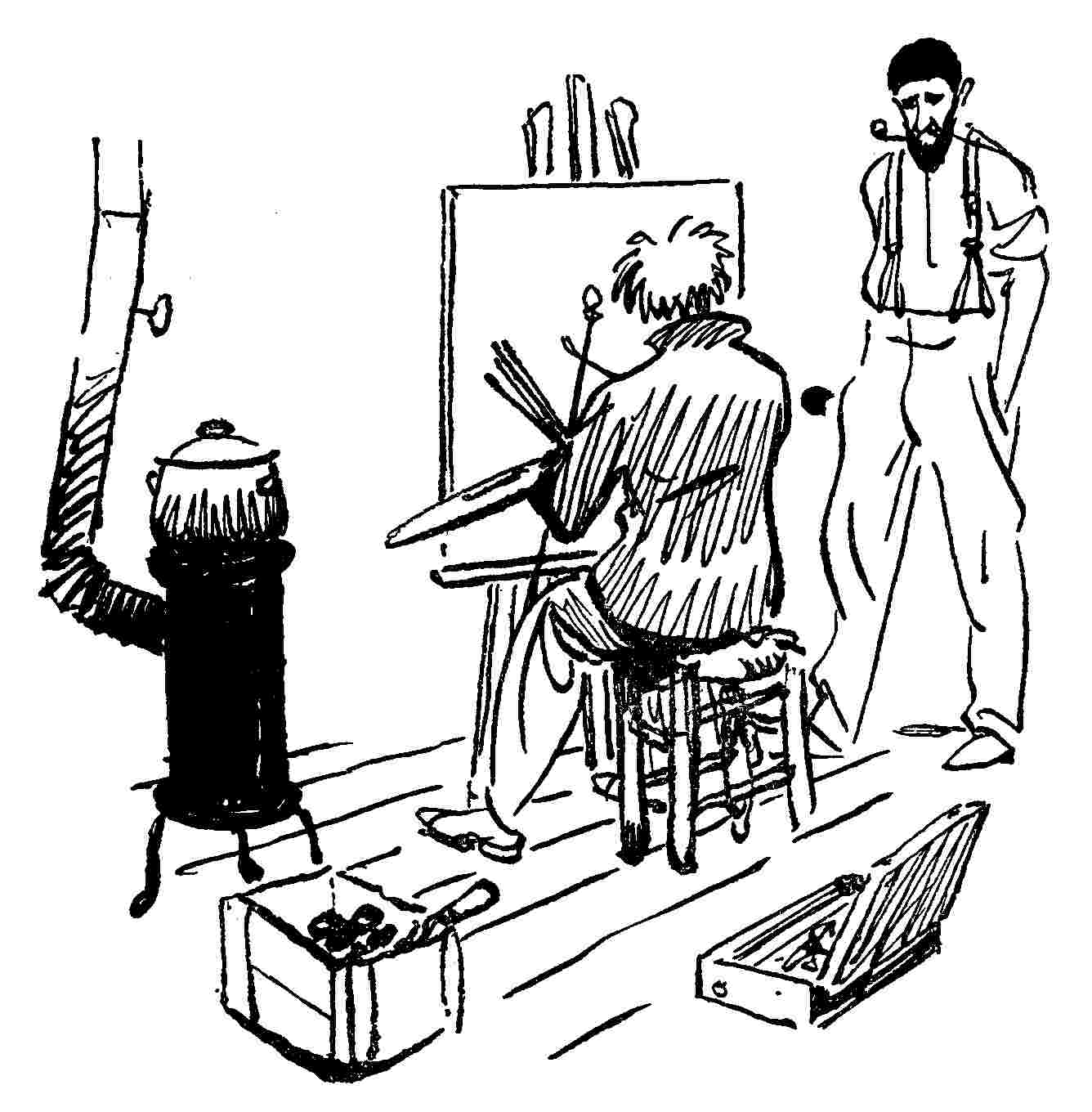

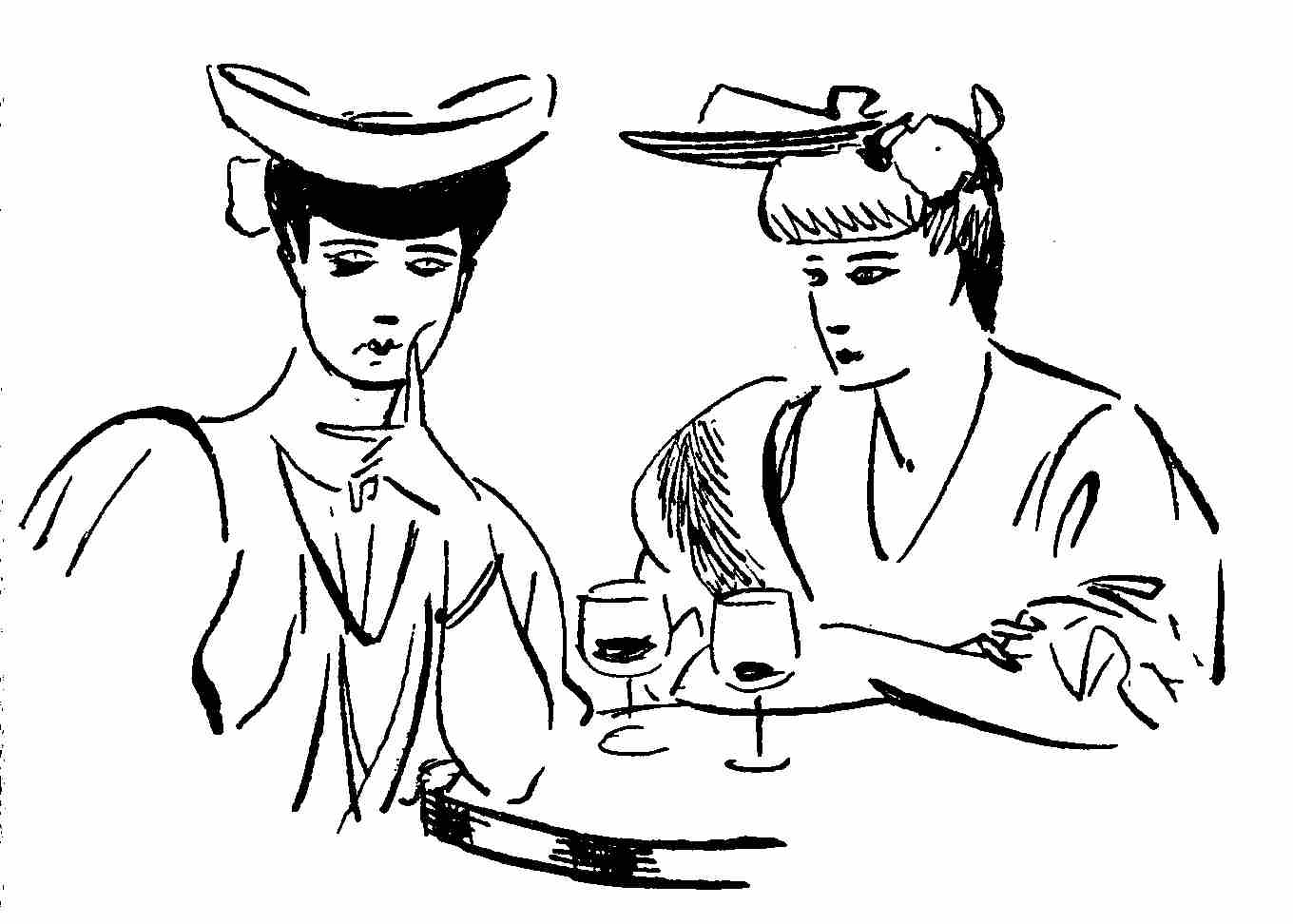

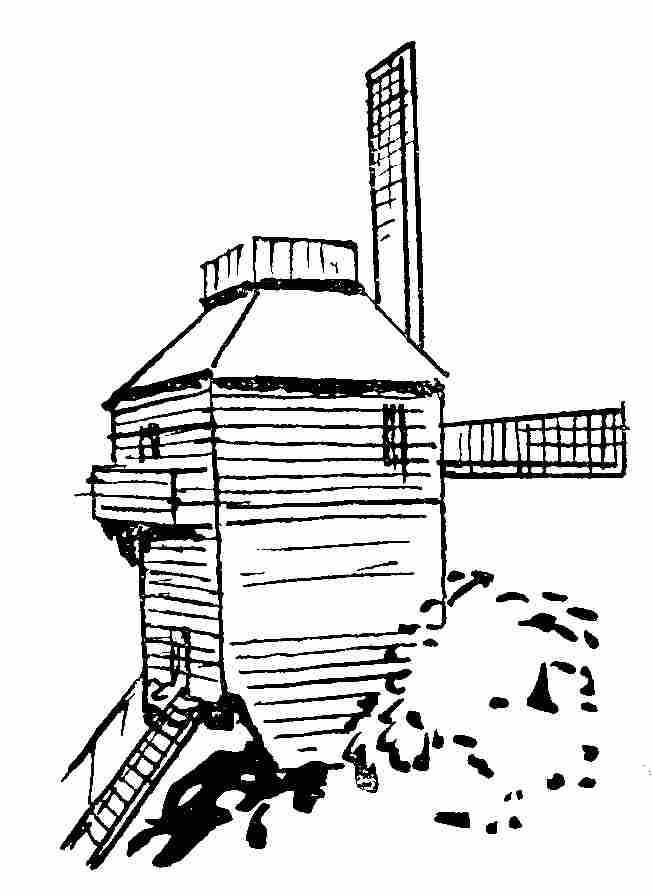

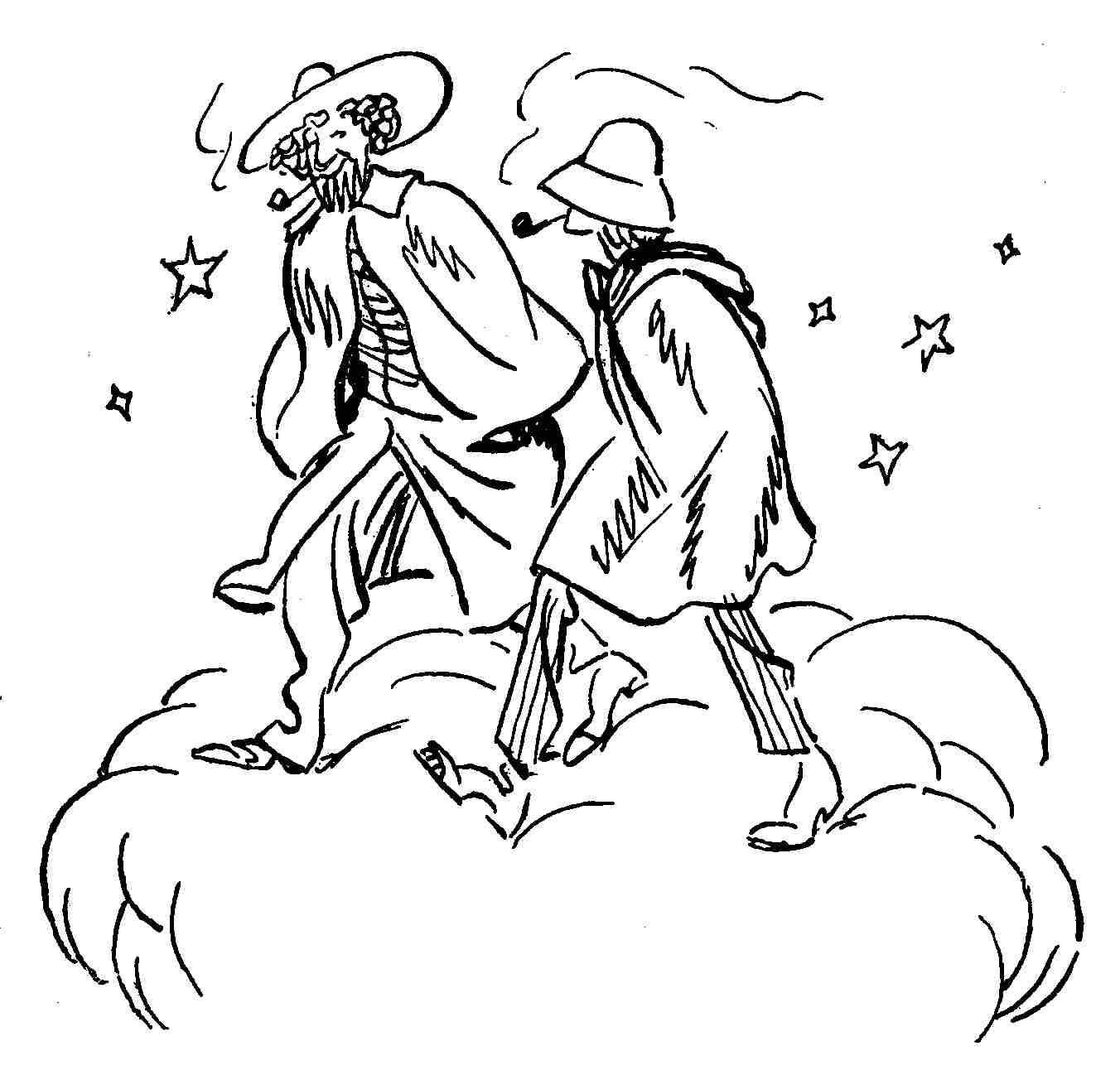
