= The Darling of Paris (1931 film) =

1931 film directed by Augusto Genina

- Directed by: Augusto Genina
- Written by: Francis Carco
- Starring: Jane Marnac; Jean Gabin; Jean-Max; Charles Lamy
- Cinematography: Friedl Behn-Grund; Paul Briquet; Louis Née
- Edited by: Germain Fried
- Music by: Maurice Yvain
- Production company: Les Films Osso
- Release date: 9 October 1931
- Running time: 117 minutes
- Country: France
- Language: French

The Darling of Paris (French: Paris Béguin; lit. 'Paris Infatuation') is a 1931 French drama film directed by Augusto Genina and starring Jane Marnac, Jean Gabin and Jean-Max. It was one of the first films to portray Gabin in his characteristic 1930s setting of pessimistic working class locations.

== Plot ==
Jane Diamaond is a music hall star. As she goes home one night, she catches Bob, a burglar ftrying to steal her jewelry. After spending the night with him, she realizes she is actually living out a scene she just refused to act on stage that very night.

Bob is arrested the next day for a murder he didn't commit. Jane provides her new lover with an alibi, unleashing the jealousy of Gaby, a woman who has long been in love with Bob. Gaby then has Bob killed by Ficelle and Dédé, the real culprits of the first murder.

== Cast ==
- Jane Marnac as Jane Diamond
- Jean Gabin as Bob
- Jean-Max as Dédé
- Charles Lamy as L'auteur
- Pierre Finaly as Le producteur
- Saturnin Fabre as Hector
- Rachel Bérendt as Gaby
- Fernandel as Ficelle
- Pierre Mayer as Beausourire
- Violaine Barry as Simone
- Pedro Elviro as Author's assistant

== Production ==
The film is a de facto remake of the 1911 short L'Épouvante, Jane Marnac reprising the role held by Mistinguett.

== Reception ==
It was one of the first films to portray Gabin in his characteristic 1930s setting of pessimistic working class locations and such an important step in Gabin's access to stardom. It addresses the topics of "hunger for power and class rise" in a typical "realist" manner.

== Bibliography ==
- Higbee, Will & Leahy, Sarah. Studies in French Cinema: UK Perspectives, 1985-2010. Intellect Books, 2011.
- List of contemporary reviews on CalIndex (In French)
