= Paul Fabre =

French journalist

- Born: 1867; Montreal, Quebec, Canada
- Died: 18 December 1902 (aged 34–35); Paris, France
- Occupations: Actor and theatre critic
- Known for: Paris-Canada

Paul Fabre (1867 – 18 December 1902) was a French-Canadian actor, theatre critic and journalist who was active in Paris in the 1890s.

== Early years ==
Fabre was born in Montreal in 1867. He was the son of Hector Fabre (1834–1910) of Montreal, a French Canadian lawyer, journalist, diplomat and senator, and Flora Stein of Arthabaska, Quebec. His father was appointed Canada's first General Agent in Paris, holding office from 1882 until his death in 1910. Fabre was aged 15 when he accompanied his parents to Paris.

Fabre became an actor and theatre critic. In 1887 he founded Gardénia, a theatrical and artistic circle. Gardénia included many members of Le Chat Noir, such as Alphonse Allais, George Auriol, Paul Delmet, Jean-Louis Dubut de Laforest, Hugues Delorme, Georges Fragerolle and Georges Courteline. The comedian and singer Pierre Trimouillat also became a member.

== Paris-Canada ==
In February 1892 Fabre was appointed editorial secretary of the journal Paris-Canada, and two years later was made editor. Paris-Canada had been founded in 1882 with offices in Montreal, Quebec and Paris, with the purpose of making Canada well known in France, and France better known in Canada. Paris-Canada had a sophisticated Rive Droite flavor, covering Montmartre, the Grands Boulevards and the Rue de la Chaussée-d'Antin. It included sections on literature, music and the theatre.

In 1896 Fabre said that Paris-Canada reflected ideas, sentiments and interests of both sides of the Atlantic. He stressed that the practical goal of promoting business ties between the two countries was of great importance. However, the journal had little commercial influence compared to its significant cultural impact.

== Quebec Commissariat ==
On 2 October 1896, at his father's recommendation, the Canadian government appointed Fabre secretary to the Commissariat of the Province of Quebec in Paris with a salary of $500. His father's salary was reduced by the same amount. Fabre transformed the Commissariat of Quebec into a cultural center that influenced the whole artistic community of Paris.

However, his health was poor. Fabre died on 18 December 1902 at the age of 35.

== Sources ==
- Garneau, Philippe (February 2008). "LES RELATIONS ENTRE LA FRANCE ET LE CANADA À LA FIN DU XIXe SIÈCLE: LA REVUE PARIS-CANADA (1884–1909)" (PDF) (in French).
- Luneau, Marie-Pier (2010-01-01). Passeurs d'histoire(s): figures des relations France-Québec en histoire du livre (in French). Presses Université Laval. ISBN 978-2-7637-9156-2.
- Parizeau, Gérard (1978). La chronique des Fabre (in French). Fides. ISBN 9780775506938.
- Picq, G. (2014). "Trimouillat, Pierre". Les Commérages De Tybalt (in French).
- Simard, Sylvain; Vaugeois, Denis (1994). "Fabre, Hector (baptized Louis-Roch-Hector)". In Cook, Ramsay; Hamelin, Jean (eds.). Dictionary of Canadian Biography. Vol. XIII (1901–1910) (online ed.). University of Toronto Press.
