= Fernand Fau =

French illustrator and cartoonist

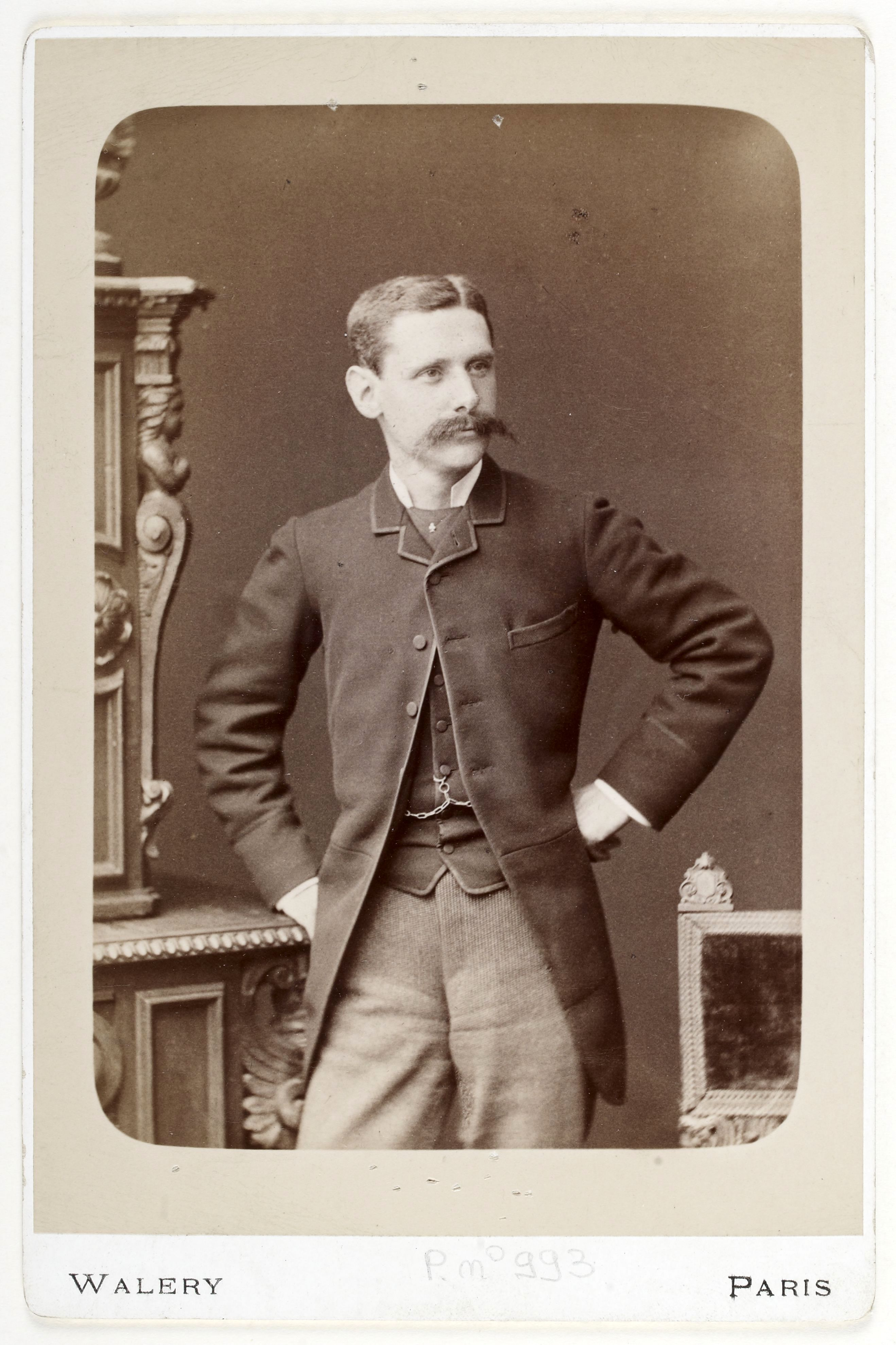
- Born: 13 July 1858; Poitiers
- Died: 27 November 1915 (aged 57); Paris
- Occupation: Illustrator
- Known for: Cartoons

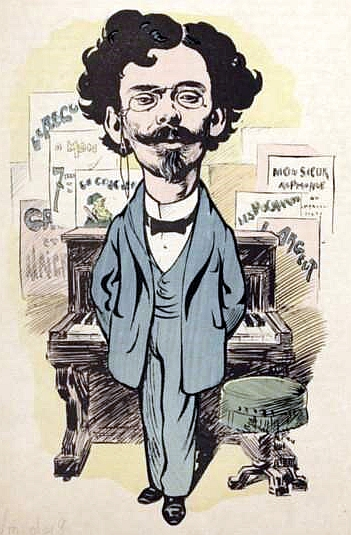
Pierre Trimouillat by Fernand Fau

Fernand Fau (13 July 1858 – 27 November 1915) was a French illustrator and cartoonist whose work was widely published in popular journals around the turn of the 19th century.

== Biography ==
Fau was born in Poitiers in 1858. He produced copious illustrations under the pseudonym "Fanfare". He made the illustrations for the drama by Ferny "Le Secret du manifestant" at the "shadow show" in the cabaret Le Chat Noir. He also illustrated the shadow show Une Affaire d'honneur by Jules Jouy at Le Chat Noir. In 1890 Le Chat Noir put on his Idylle, a revue in one act with music by Charles de Sivry. His illustrations appeared in the Chat Noir humorous magazine and also in Le Rire. He illustrated many children's books throughout his career, and was a satirist. Fau was also versed in Art Nouveau, and exhibited at the Salon des Cent in 1895.

Fernand Fau died in Paris in 1915.

== Illustrated works ==
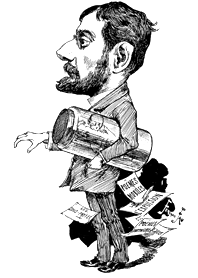
Caricature of the poet and singer Maurice Mac-Nab c. 1880

- Jean Perrot, 34 leçons de choses en images sans paroles à raconter par les petits, deuxième livre d'initiation et d'élocution, F. Nathan
- Alfred Carel, Les brasseries à femmes de Paris, Paris : E. Monnier, 1884
- Camille Lemonnier, Les Concubins; La Glèbe; Un pèlerinage, Paris, E. Monnier, de Brunhoff, 1886
- Grand-Carteret, John (1886). Raphaël et Gambrinus, ou, L'art dans la brasserie. L. Westhausser. p. 50.
- Devaux, Paul (2011). Les fellatores: mœurs de la décadence 1888. QuestionDeGenre/GKC. ISBN 978-2908050714.
- de Lano, Pierre (1889). Après l'amour, avec 100 dessins de Fernand Fau: gravure de Rougeron et Vignerot. E. Dentu.
- Grosclaude (1891). Les Gaietes de L'Annee. Illustrated by Fernand Fau. Paris: E. Dentu.
- G. Le Faure (1898). La Guerre sous L'Eau. Illustrated by Fernand Fau. Libraire E. Dentu.
- Georges Courteline, La Peur des coups, Paris, G. Charpentier et E. Fasquelle, 1895
- Rabelais pour la jeunesse, Gargantua, texte adapté par Marie Butts, Librairie Larousse
- Rabelais pour la jeunesse, Pantagruel, texte adapté par Marie Butts, Librairie Larousse
