= Jean-Louis Dubut de Laforest =

French author (1853–1902)

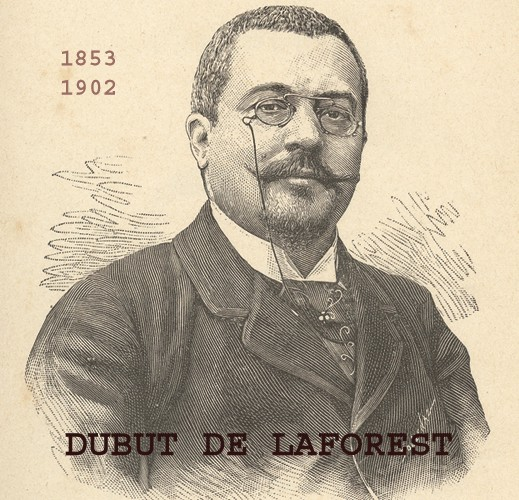
- Born: 24 July 1853; Saint-Pardoux-la-Rivière, Dordogne, France
- Died: 3 April 1902 (aged 48); Paris, France
- Occupation: Writer

Jean-Louis Dubut de Laforest (24 July 1853 – 3 April 1902) was a French author. He was a prolific writer, and published many novels on topics that were considered daring for the times, some of which were serialized in the press.

== Life ==
Jean-Louis Dubut de Laforest was born in Saint-Pardoux-la-Rivière, Dordogne on 24 July 1853. He attended secondary schools in Périgueux and Limoges. After studying law, Jean-Louis Laforest Dubut became an advocate and editor of the newspaper L'Avenir de la Dordogne. He was appointed prefectorial counselor in Beauvais, Oise, in 1879, but resigned in 1882 and devoted himself to literature. He wrote many novels and plays, and contributed to Le Figaro under the pseudonym "Jean Tolbiac".

Dubut de Laforest was a member of Le Chat Noir and of the theatrical and artistic circle Gardénia, founded by Paul Fabre. He published a number of novels that were based on the scientific discoveries of his time, and also novels of manners: Les Dames de Lameth, Tête à l'envers, La Crucifiée, Le Rêve d'un viveur, Un américain de Paris, Belle-maman, La Baronne Emma, Contes à la paresseuse, Les Dévorants de Paris, Le Gaga, La Bonne à tout-faire, Le Cornac, Mademoiselle de Marbeuf and Contes à la lune.

In Le Faiseur d'hommes (The Maker of Men) (1884), Dubut de Laforest treated the problem of artificial insemination of a woman for the first time in the history of literature. He addressed realities such as the existence of homosexual circles in Paris in La Vierge du trottoir and Esthètes et cambrioleurs. He broke literary taboos. When he published Le Gaga in 1885 he was prosecuted for obscenity before the court of Assizes. The author was sentenced to a fine of 1,000 francs and two months in prison. Collected in the thirty-seven volume series Derniers Scandales de Paris (1898–1900), his novels of manners depicted a whole parallel world of prostitutes, pimps and bad boys. He was called "an anticlerical and obscene novelist" by a conservative critic. He shared with other authors the distinction of being placed in the "inferno" of the National Library.

Despite his success, Dubut de Laforest committed suicide on 3 April 1902.

== Works ==
- Les Dames de Lamète, éditions Charpentier, 1880, édition critique de Victor Flori aux éditions du Livre unique, 2009.
- Les martyres de la vie, éditions Boulanger, 1880.
- Tête à l’envers, éditions Charpentier, 1882.
- La Crucifiée, éditions Lévy (Calman-Lévy), 1883.
- Le Rêve d’un viveur, éditions Rouveyre et Bloud, 1883.
- Mademoiselle Tantale, éditions Dentu, 1884.
- Belle maman, mœurs contemporaines, éditions Dentu, 1884.
- Un Américain à Paris, éditions Lévy (Calman-Lévy), 1884.
- La Baronne Emma Suzette, éditions Dentu, 1885.
- Contes de la paresseuse, éditions Monnier, 1885.
- Les Dévorants de Paris, éditions Dentu, 1885.
- L’Espion Gismark, éditions Dentu, 1885.
- Le Gaga, mœurs parisiennes, éditions Dentu, 1885; réédition, Milan, Cisalpino Istituto Editoriale Universitario, « Bibliothèque de la décadence » #2, 2008 ISBN 978-88-323-6092-9
- La Bonne à tout faire, éditions Dentu, 1886, édition critique de Victor Flori aux éditions du Livre unique en 2011.
- Contes pour les baigneuses, éditions Dentu, 1886.
- Le Cornac, éditions Dentu, 1887.
- Documents humains, éditions Dentu, 1888.
- Mademoiselle de Marbeuf, éditions Dentu, 1888.
- Contes de la lune, éditions Dentu, 1889.
- L’Homme de joie, éditions Dentu, 1889.
- La Baronne Emma, éditions Dentu, 1890.
- La Femme d’affaires, éditions Dentu, 1890.
- Le Grapin, éditions Dentu, 1890.
- Colette et Renée, éditions Dentu, 1891.
- Le Commis-voyageur, éditions Dentu, 1891.
- Contes à Panurge, éditions Dentu, 1891.
- Morphine, éditions Dentu, 1891 (édition critique de Victor Flori : Livre unique, 2008).
- L’Abandonnée, éditions Dentu, 1892.
- Contes pour les hommes, éditions Dentu, 1892.
- Rabelais, éditions Dentu, 1893.
- La Haute bande, éditions Dentu, 1893.
- Les Petites Rastas, éditions Dentu, 1894
- Le Cocu imaginaire, éditions Dentu, 1895.
- Mademoiselle de T…, éditions Dentu, 1895.
- Angéla Bouchaud, demoiselle de magasin, éditions Dentu, 1896.
- Amours de jadis et d’aujourd’hui, éditions Dentu, 1897.
- Messidor, éditions Dentu, 1897.
- La Traite des blanches, éditions Fayard, 1900, édition critique aux éditions du Livre unique en 2009.
- Madame Barbe-Bleu, éditions Fayard, 1901, édition critique de Victor Flori aux éditions du Livre unique en 2010.
- Les Marchands de Femmes, éditions Fayard, 1901, édition critique de Victor Flori aux éditions du Livre unique en 2010.
- Trimardon, éditions Fayard, 1901, édition critique de Victor Flori aux éditions du Livre unique en 2010.
- La Tournée des Grands-Ducs, éditions Flammarion, 1901.
- Monsieur Pithec et la Vénus des Fortifs, éditions Flammarion, 1902.

Les Derniers Scandales de Paris, 37 volumes, éditions Fayard, 1898–1900, included the following titles:

- La Vierge du trottoir
- Les Souteneurs en habit noir
- La Grande Horizontale
- Le Dernier Gigolo
- Madame Don Juan
- Le Caissier du tripot
- Le Docteur Mort-aux-gosses
- Le Tartuffe-Paillard
- Les Victimes de la débauche
- Ces Dames au salon et à la mer
- Les Écuries d'Augias
- Agathe-la-Goule
- Esthètes et cambrioleurs
- Un Bandit amoureux
- La Brocante
- Per' Mich'
- Maîtresses et amants
- Faiseurs et gogos
- Haute galanterie
- Le Lanceur de femmes
- Les Petites Rastas
- Farabinas
- La Demoiselle de magasin
- Robes et manteaux
- Peau-de-balle et balais-de-crin
- Le Coiffeur pour dames
- Travail et volupté
- Le Nouveau Commis voyageur
- L'Homme de joie
- La Marmite d'or
- Mademoiselle de Marbeuf
- Morphine: describes the downfall of a man who is addicted to drugs
- Cloé de Haut-Brion
- La Môme réséda
- La Bombe
- Rédemption
