= Hugues Delorme =

French journalist and poet (1868–1942)

- Born: Georges Amédée Armand François-Thiébost; 10 April 1868; Avize, Marne, France
- Died: May 20, 1942 (aged 74); Paris
- Occupations: Poet, comedian, playwright and journalist

Hugues Delorme (French pronunciation: [yɡ dəlɔʁm]; 10 April 1868 – 20 May 1942) was a French poet, comedian, playwright and journalist.

== Life ==
Hugues Delorme was born on 10 April 1868 at Avize in the department of Marne with the name of Georges Thiebost. He first lived in Rouen where he worked as a journalist for several years before moving to Paris. From 1896 he frequented the cabarets of Montmartre and became a poet, humorist, playwright and actor. He was well known at Le Chat Noir cabaret. He joined Gardénia, a theatrical and artistic circle founded by Paul Fabre.

Hugues Delorme was very tall and slender, and was nicknamed La Voltige. He participated with Paul Delmet, Gaston Montoya, Jacques Ferny and Marcel Legay in creating popular or sentimental songs that were mainly sung in the cabarets of Montmartre. Delorme was an editor of the journal Le Courrier français. He wrote two books about cartoonists, one about Georges Goursat (Sem) and the other about Carlègle (pseudonym of Charles Émile Egli). These two books were published in Paris in 1939.

Delorme also wrote numerous plays, one-act pieces, reviews and some comedies and novels. He works were performed at neighborhood theaters and at café-concerts such as Le Coup de minuit. During his lifetime, he was best known for his classical poetry in octosyllables. His poetry was widely published in various periodicals, but hardly any of it was published in collections.

Delorme died on 20 May 1942 and lies in the 89th division of the Père Lachaise Cemetery. His tomb is decorated with the inscription:

"How sweet when you are old
To love one who loves you ... "

== Works ==
- 1889 Pierrot Amoureux
- 1891 Pierrot financier
- 1894 La Mort d’Orphée
- 1900 La Marchande de pommes
- 1903 Mille regrets! cowritten with Francis Gally
- 1907 L'Homme rouge et la femme verte, cowritten with Armand Nunès
- 1907 Le Maître à aimer, cowritten with Pierre Veber
- 1907 Zénaïde ou les caprices du destin
- 1912 Revue de l'Olympia, interpreted by Yvonne Printemps
- 1913 Et patati et patata, cowritten with Georges Nanteuil, interpreted by Yvonne Printemps
- 1914 La Fille de Figaro, cowritten with Maurice Hennequin, music Xavier Leroux, with Jane Marnac
- 1921 Chanson d'amour (Song of Love), adapted with Léon Abric from Das Dreimäderlhaus (7 May 1921)
- 1926 Divin Mensonge, operetta in 3 acts and 6 tableaux by Josef Szulc, cowritten with Alex Madis and Pierre Veber
- 1926 Le Temps d'aimer operetta in 3 acts by Henri Duvernois and Pierre Wolff, couplets by Hugues Delorme, music Reynaldo Hahn, Théâtre de la Michodière, 7 November 1926
