= Grand Guignol =

1897–1962 theatre in Paris, France

Coordinates: 48°52′53″N 2°19′59″E

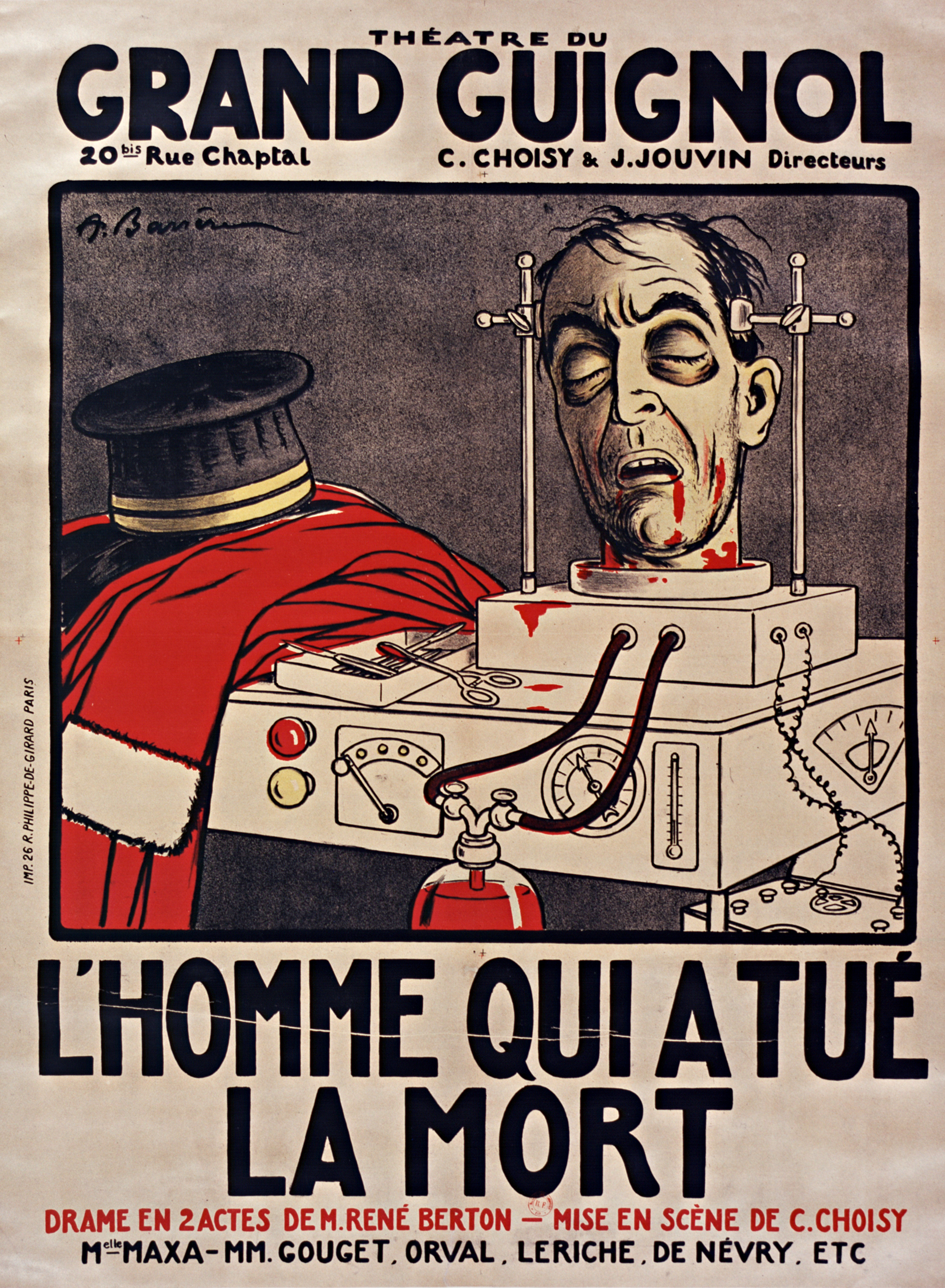
Promotional poster for a Grand Guignol performance called "The Man Who Killed Death"

The Théâtre du Grand-Guignol (French pronunciation: [lə teɑtʁ dy ɡʁɑ̃ ɡiɲɔl]) was a theater in the Pigalle district of Paris (7, cité Chaptal). From its opening in 1897 until its closing in 1962, it specialized in horror shows. Its name is often used as a general term for graphic, amoral horror entertainment, a genre popular from Elizabethan and Jacobean theater (for instance Shakespeare's Titus Andronicus, and Webster's The Duchess of Malfi and The White Devil), to today's splatter films.

== Theater ==
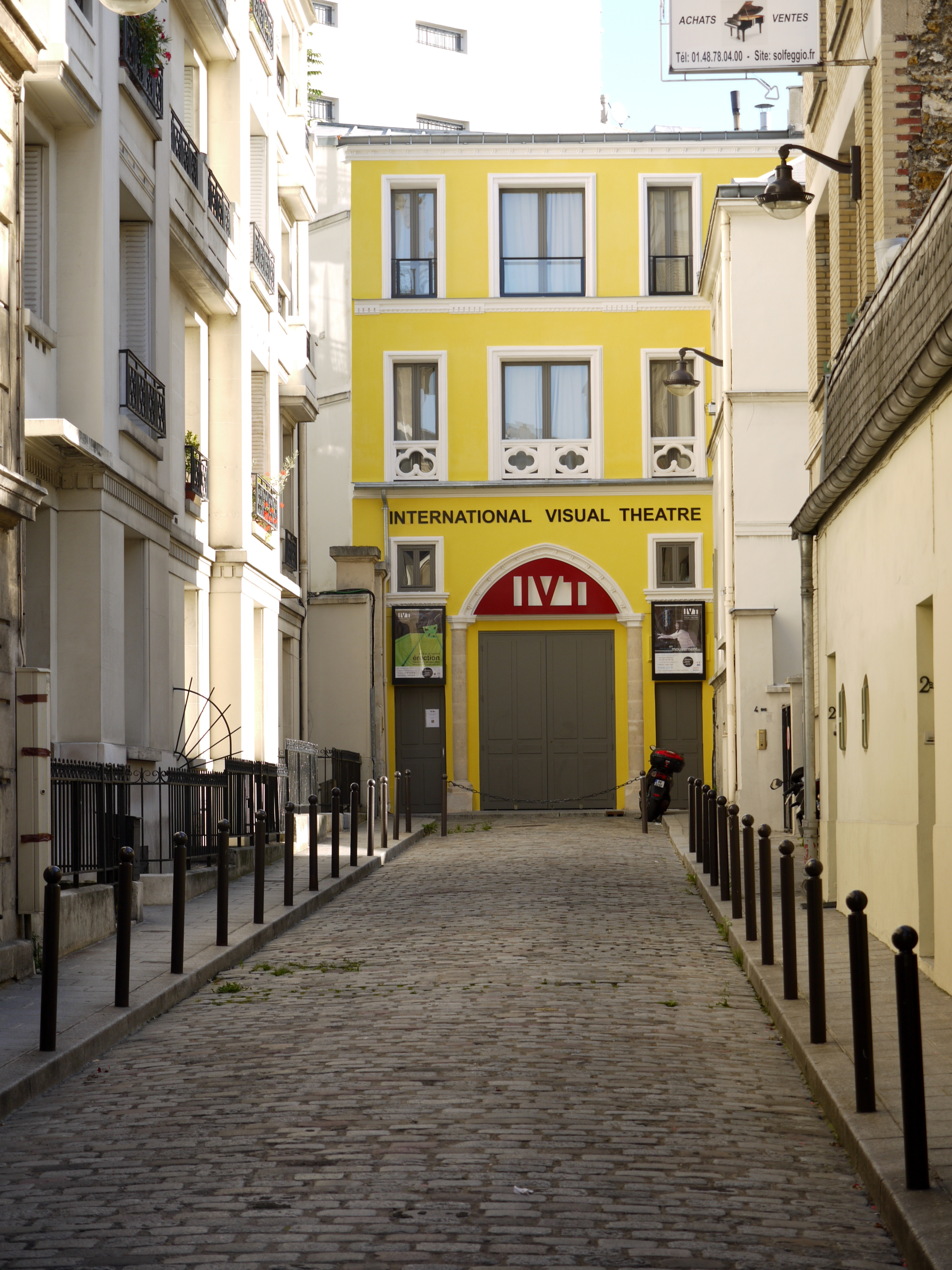
The former location of the Grand Guignol, now home to the International Visual Theatre

The Théâtre du Grand-Guignol was founded in 1897 by Oscar Méténier, who planned it as a space for naturalist performance. With 293 seats, the venue was the smallest in Paris.

A former chapel, the theatre's previous life was evident in the boxes — which looked like confessionals — and in the angels over the orchestra. Although the architecture created frustrating obstacles, the design that was initially a predicament ultimately became beneficial to the marketing of the theatre. The opaque furniture and gothic structures placed sporadically on the walls of the building exude a feeling of eeriness from the moment of entrance. People came to this theatre for an experience, not only to see a show. The audience at Grand Guignol endured the terror of the shows because they wanted to be filled with strong "feelings" of something. Many attended the shows to get a feeling of sexual arousal.

Underneath the balcony were boxes (originally built for nuns to watch church services) that were available for theatre-goers to rent during performances because they would get so aroused by the action happening on stage. It has been said that audience members would get so boisterous in the boxes, that actors would sometimes break character and yell something such as "Keep it down in there!" Conversely, there were audience members who could not physically handle the brutality of the actions taking place on stage. Frequently, the "special effects" would be too realistic and often an audience member would faint or vomit during performances. Theater director Max Maurey used the goriness to his advantage by hiring doctors to be at performances as a marketing ploy.

The theatre owed its name to Guignol, a traditional Lyonnaise puppet character, joining political commentary with the style of Punch and Judy.

The theatre's peak was between World War I and World War II, when it was frequented by royalty and celebrities in evening dress.

== Important people ==
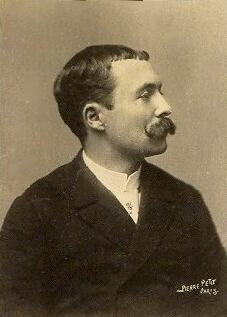
Oscar Méténier

Oscar Méténier was the Grand Guignol's founder and original director. Under his direction, the theater produced plays about a class of people who were not considered appropriate subjects in other venues: prostitutes, criminals, street urchins and others at the lower end of Paris's social echelon.

André Antoine was the founder of the Théâtre Libre and a collaborator of Méténier. His theater gave Méténier a basic model to use for The Grand Guignol theater.

Max Maurey served as director from 1898 to 1914. Maurey shifted the theater's emphasis to the horror plays it would become famous for and judged the success of a performance by the number of patrons who passed out from shock; the average was two faintings each evening. Maurey discovered André de Lorde, who would become the most important playwright for the theater.

De Lorde was the theater's principal playwright from 1901 to 1926. He wrote at least 100 plays for the Grand Guignol, such as The Old Woman, The Ultimate Torture, A Crime in the Mad House and more. He collaborated with experimental psychologist Alfred Binet to create plays about insanity, one of the theater's favorite and frequently recurring themes.

Camille Choisy served as director from 1914 to 1930. He contributed his expertise in special effects and scenery to the theater's distinctive style.

Paula Maxa was one of the Grand Guignol's best-known performers. From 1917 to the 1930s, she performed most frequently as a victim and was known as "the most assassinated woman in the world." During her career at the Grand Guignol, Maxa's characters were murdered more than 10,000 times in at least 60 different ways and raped at least 3,000 times.

Jack Jouvin served as director from 1930 to 1937. He shifted the theater's subject matter, focusing performances not on gory horror but psychological drama. Under his leadership, the theater's popularity waned and, after World War II, it was not well-attended.

Charles Nonon was the theater's last director.

== Plays ==
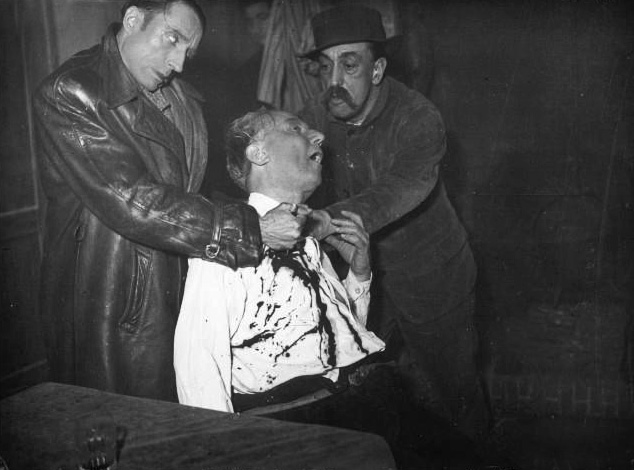
A 1937 scene from Grand Guignol

In a typical Grand Guignol performance patrons would see five or six short plays, all in a style that attempted to be brutally true to the theater's naturalistic ideals. The most popular and best-known were the horror plays, which featured a distinctly bleak worldview and gory special effects, particularly in their climaxes. The horrors depicted at Grand Guignol were generally not supernatural; rather these plays often explored altered states like insanity, hypnosis, or panic. To heighten the effect, the horror plays were often alternated with comedies, a lineup referred to as "hot and cold showers."

Examples of Grand Guignol horror shows included:

- Le Laboratoire des Hallucinations, by André de Lorde: When a doctor finds his wife's lover in his operating room, he performs a graphic brain surgery, rendering the adulterer a hallucinating semi-zombie. Now insane, the lover/patient hammers a chisel into the doctor's brain.
- Un Crime dans une Maison de Fous, by André de Lorde: Two hags in an insane asylum use scissors to blind a pretty young fellow inmate out of jealousy.
- L'Horrible Passion, by André de Lorde: A nanny strangles the children in her care.
- Le Baiser dans la Nuit, by Maurice Level: A young woman visits the man whose face she horribly disfigured with acid, and he obtains his revenge.

== Closure ==
Audiences waned in the years following World War II, and the Grand Guignol closed its doors in 1962. Management attributed the closure in part to the fact that the theater's faux horrors had been eclipsed by the actual events of the Holocaust two decades earlier. "We could never equal Buchenwald," said its final director, Charles Nonon. "Before the war, everyone felt that what was happening onstage was impossible. Now we know that these things, and worse, are possible in reality."

The Grand Guignol building still exists. It is occupied by the International Visual Theatre, a company devoted to presenting plays in sign language.

== Thematic and structural analysis ==
While the original Grand Guignol attempted to present naturalistic horror, the performances would seem melodramatic and heightened to today's audiences. For this reason, the term is often applied to films and plays of a stylized nature with heightened acting, melodrama and theatrical effects such as Sweeney Todd, Sleepy Hollow, Quills, and the Hammer Horror films that came before them. What Ever Happened to Baby Jane?; Hush...Hush, Sweet Charlotte; What Ever Happened to Aunt Alice?; What's the Matter with Helen?; Night Watch and Whoever Slew Auntie Roo? form a sub-branch of the genre called Grande Dame Guignol for its use of aging A-list actresses in sensational horror films.

Audiences had strong reactions to the new disturbing themes the horror plays presented. One of the most prevalent themes staged at the Grand-Guignol was the demoralization and corruption of science. The "evil doctor" was a recurring trope in the horror shows performed. The popular show The System of Doctor Goudron and Professor Plume by André de Lorde displays a depiction of a doctor typical of the theater. Dr. Goudron is portrayed as manic, insane, unreliable. He is seen "pac[ing] nervously" and "jumping on [a] desk and gesticulating". Later Lorde depicts the scientist as violent, with Goudron attempting to carve out an eye and then bite the hands of guards. During the time, curiosity and skepticism ravaged science and medicine. The depiction of scientists at the Grand-Guignol reflected the public attitude of fear and disdain. Medical science held a reputation of "terror and peculiar infamy". Middle-class Parisian society believed science existed in a world of frivolity and falsehood, whereas art existed in a world of honesty. Poet Matthew Arnold is an exemplary lens to use in order to understand these sympathies.

The themes the Grand-Guignol introduced into the horror genre affected how the genre exists today. The Grand-Guignol's introduction of naturalism into horror "unmasked brutality of contemporary culture". Previously, horror served as escapism, dealing with the supernatural and unrelatable. After the theater introduced relatable topics into the genre, the audience could visualize the plots taking place and thus experienced greater fear - the Grand-Guignol transformed the horror plot into something the audience could feel personally. Horror became a vehicle for ideas and philosophy where deep "insights gave way to spectacle, and spectacle to violence and gore, until in the end little was left but the gore". Today the horror genre begins with "optimism and hope", which "wither before random, chaotic, and inevitable violence".

== Legacy and revivals ==
Grand Guignol flourished briefly in London in the early 1920s under the direction of Jose Levy, where it attracted the talents of Sybil Thorndike, Noël Coward, and Richard Hughes (whose one-act play The Sisters' Tragedy was said to outshine even Coward's), and a series of short English "Grand Guignol" films (using original screenplays, not play adaptations) was made at the same time, directed by Fred Paul. Several of the films exist at the BFI National Archive.

The Grand Guignol was revived once again in London in 1945, under the direction of Frederick Witney, where it ran for two seasons at the Granville Theater. These included premiers of Witney's own work as well as adaptations of French originals.

In 2010, English director-write Richard Mazda re-introduced New York audiences to the Grand Guignol. His acting troupe, The Queens Players, did six mainstage productions of Grand Guignol plays, and Mazda wrote new plays in the classic Guignol style. The sixth production, Theater of Fear, included De Lorde's adaptation of Poe's The System of Doctor Tarr and Professor Fether (Le Systéme du Dr Goudron et Pr Plume) as well as two original plays, Double Crossed and The Good Death alongside The Tell Tale Heart.

The 1963 mondo film Ecco (Original title: Il mondo di notte numero 3, directed by Gianni Proia) includes a scene which may have been filmed at the Grand Guignol theater during its final years.

The Swiss theater company Compagnie Pied de Biche has revisited the Grand Guignol genre in contemporary contexts since 2008. The company staged in 2010 a diptych Impact & Dr. Incubis, based on original texts by Nicolas Yazgi and directed by Frédéric Ozier. More than literal adaptations, the plays address violence, death, crime and fear in contemporary contexts, while revisiting many trope of the original Grand Guignol corpus, often with humor.

The recently formed London-based Grand Guignol company Theatre of the Damned, brought their first production to the Camden Fringe in 2010 and produced the award nominated Grand Guignol in November of that year. In 2011, they staged Revenge of the Grand Guignol at the Courtyard theater, London, as part of the London Horror Festival.

Between 2011 and 2016, the Baltimore-based Yellow Sign Theater performed Grand Guignol productions (including a heavily updated version of Le Systéme du Dr Goudron et Pr Plume) as well as integrating Guignol elements into other performance forms.

In November 2014, 86 years after the last show of Alfredo Sainati's La Compagnia del Grand-Guignol, founded in 1908 and which had been the only example of Grand Guignol in Italy, the Convivio d'Arte Company presented in Milan Grand Guignol de Milan: Le Cabaret des Vampires. The show was an original tribute to Grand Guignol, a horror vaudeville with various horror and grotesque performances such as monologues, live music and burlesque, with a satirical black humor conduction.

Since 2022 Yorkshire-based theater company Contortium have been touring Tales of the Bizarre, a modern revival of the Grand Guignol, presenting a mixture of new pieces by various writers, and adapted originals.
