= Chanoir =

French-Colombian painter

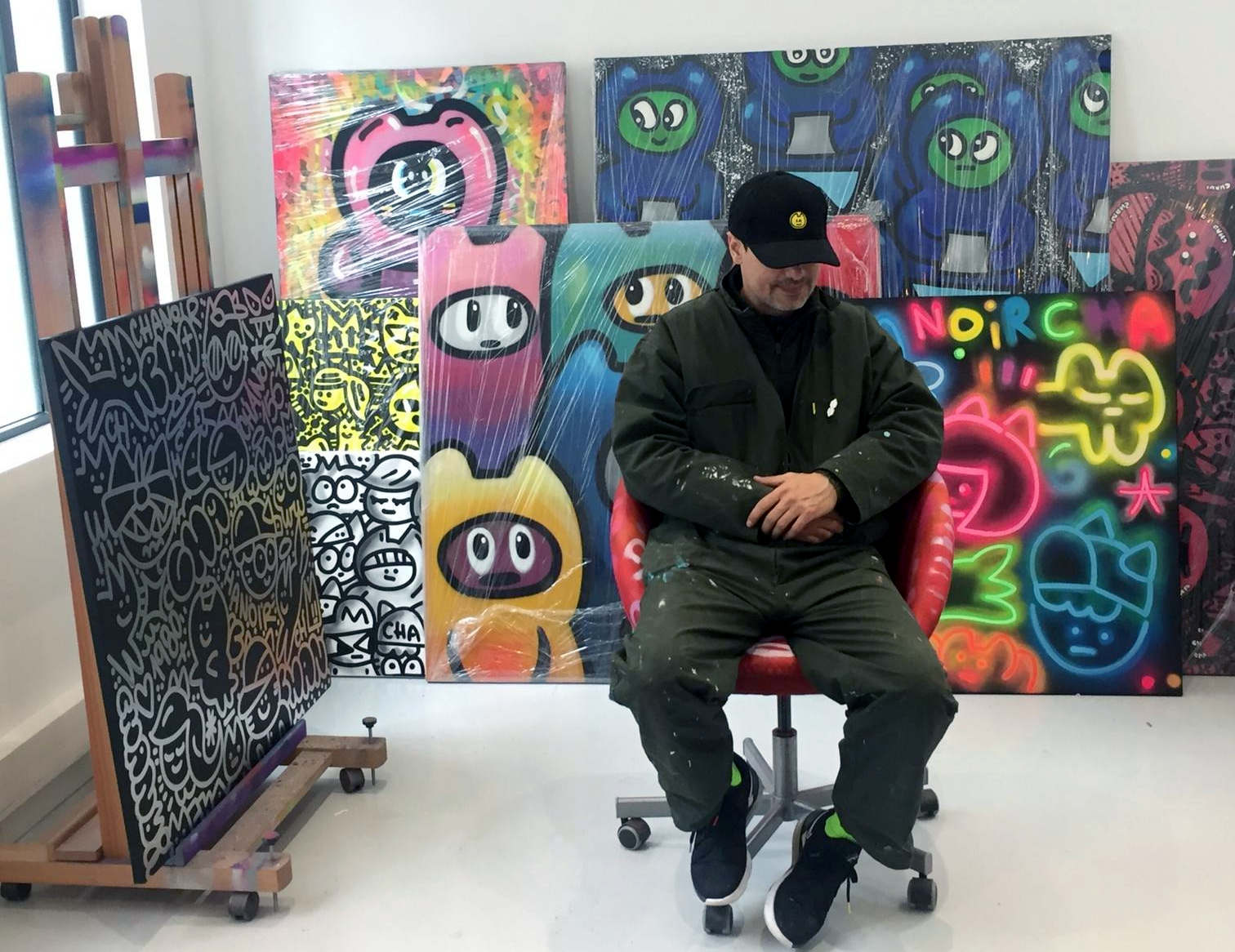
- Born: Alberto Vejarano; 1976 (age 49–50); Bogotá, Colombia
- Awards: Ordre des Arts et des Lettres
- Website: www.chanoir1980.com

Chanoir, also known as Alberto Vejarano (born 1976), is a French-Colombian contemporary street artist.

His nickname is a reference to a poster of the famous Parisian cabaret Le Chat Noir, by Théophile Steinlen.

== Biography ==
Chanoir became active in the streets of Barcelona at the beginning of Y2K, where he did the documentary Murs Libres. In 2002, he became the founder of Collectif 1980 with other artists such as Jean-Philippe Illanes, Alexandre Sirvin, Hugo Garcia, et Ernest Añaños Montoto.

His father, Gustavo Vejerano, is a painter.

== Gallery ==
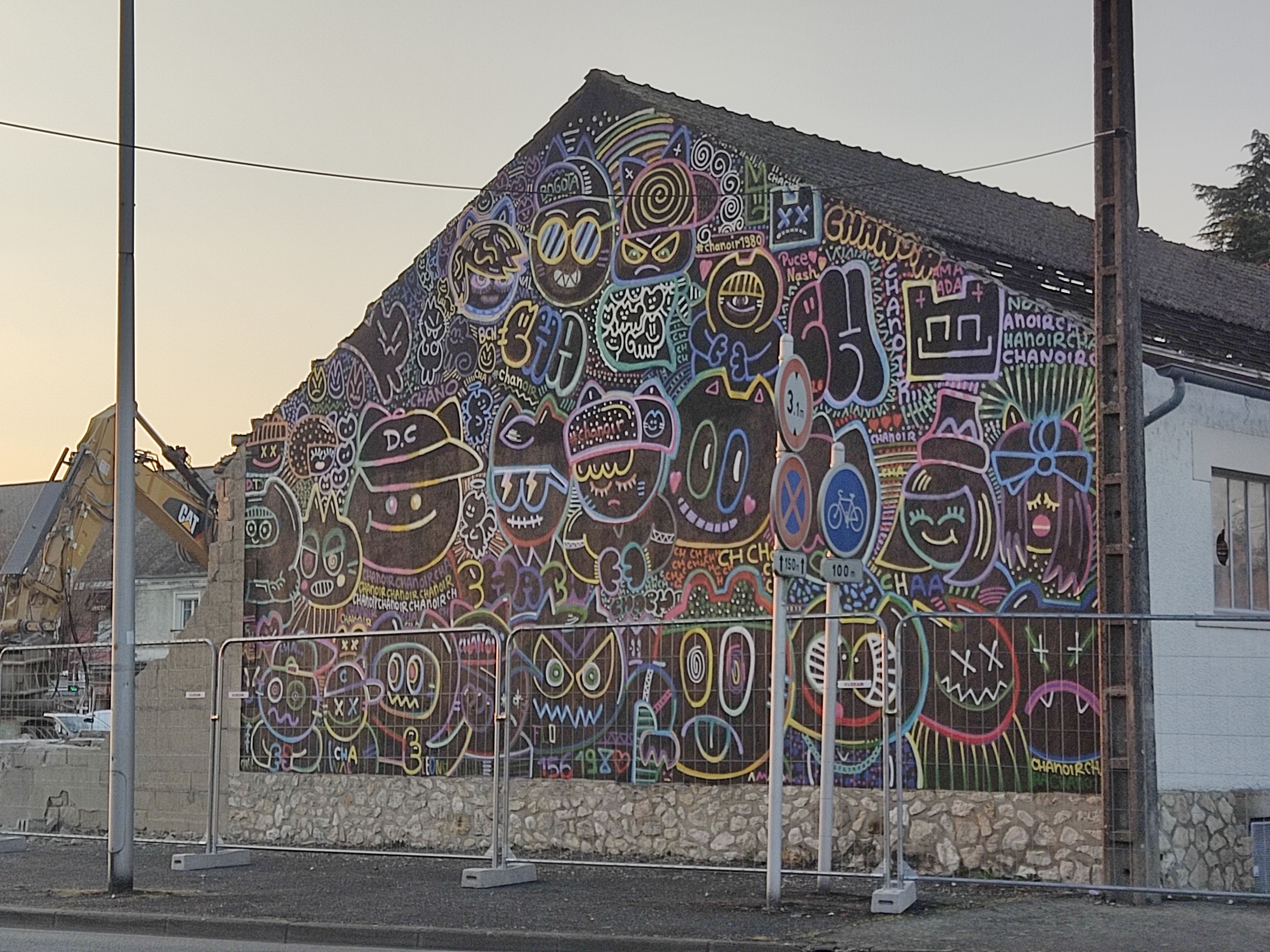

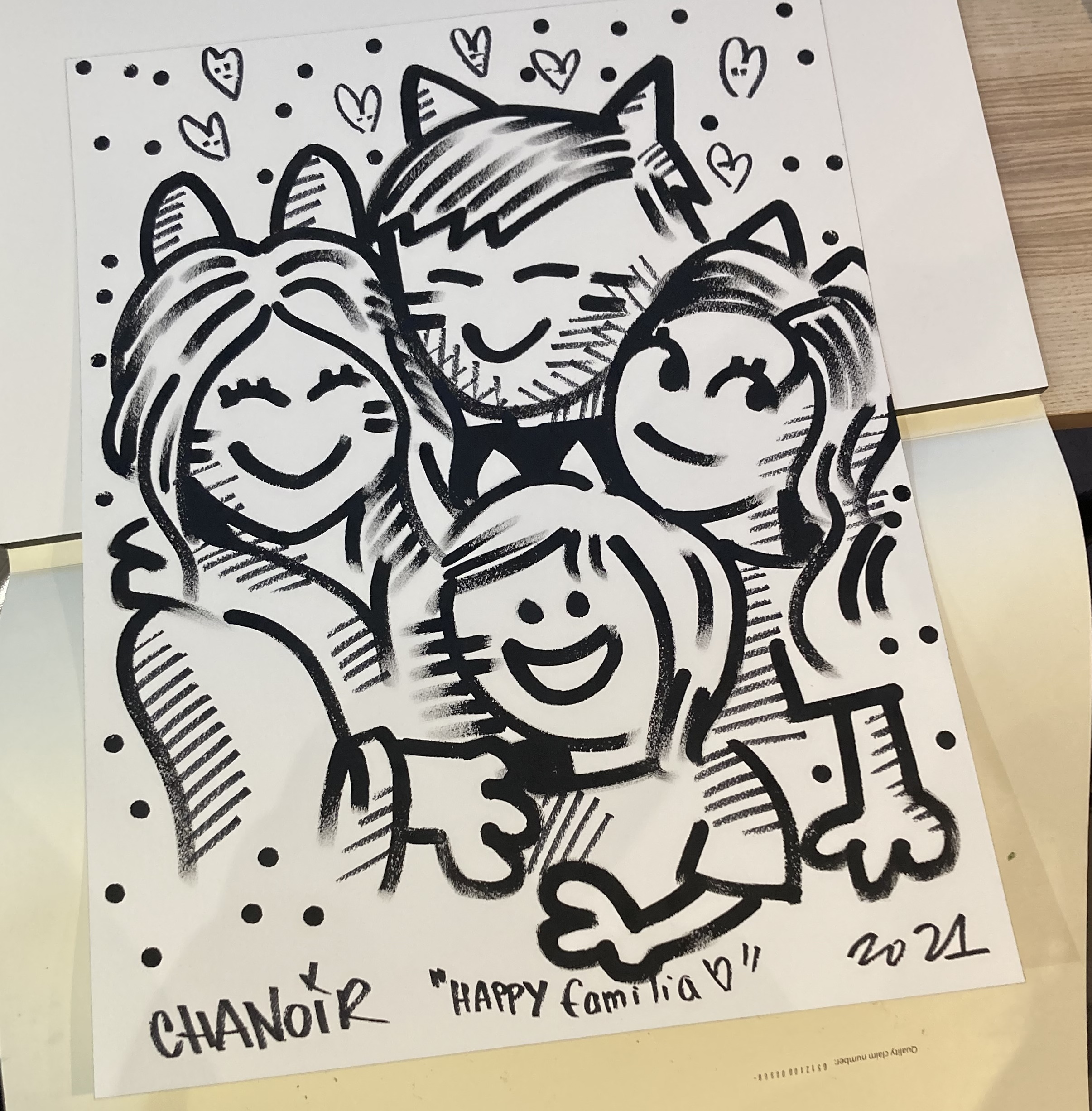

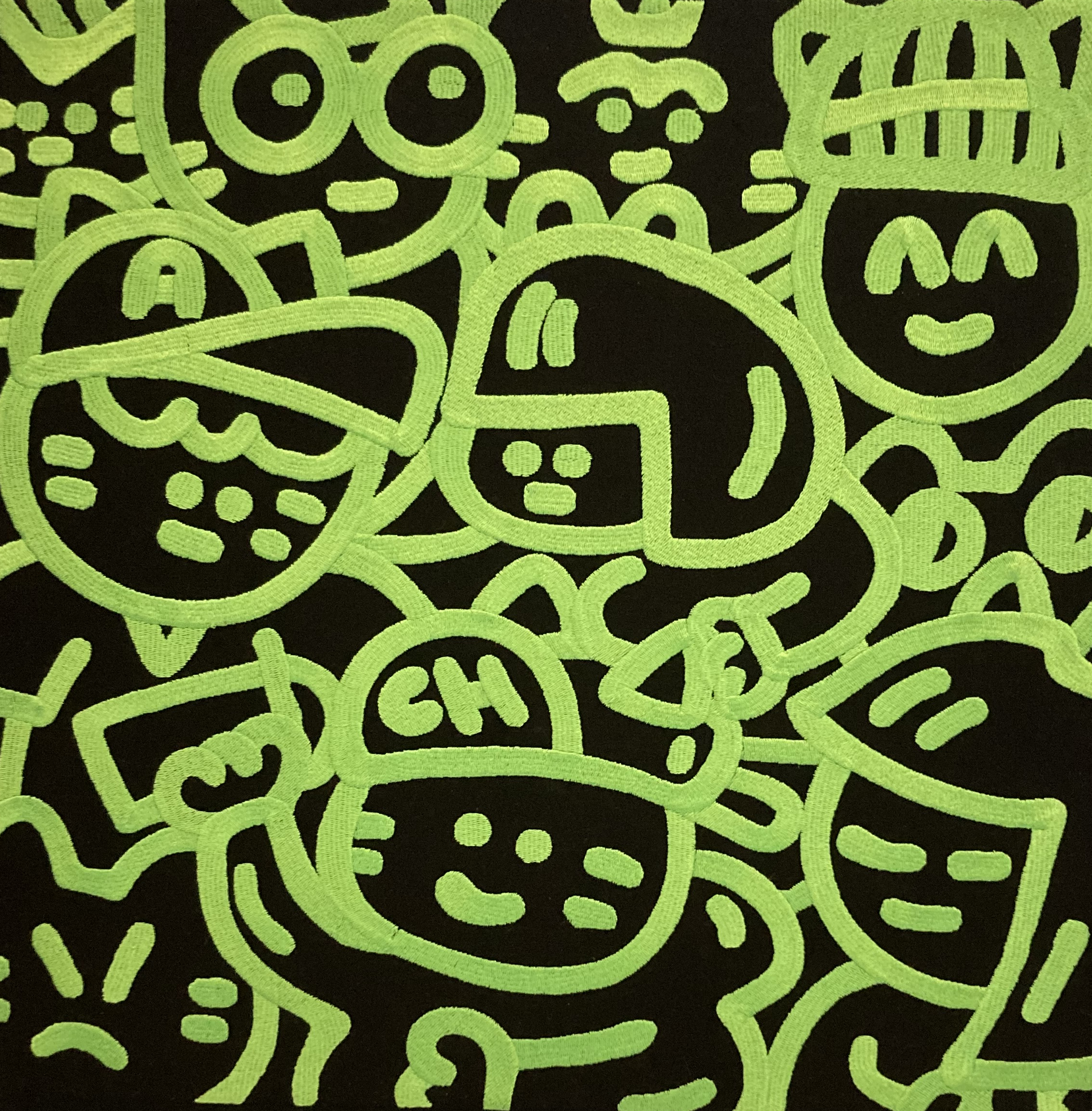

== Expositions ==
- 2011 - Les chats qui taguent, Musée en Herbe, Paris
- 2014 - Streets Hotel, Paris
- 2014 - Affordable Art Fair
- 2015 - AFF Singapour, Bruxelles & Lille
- 2017 - Scope Art Fair (Miami)
- 2018 - Nasty & Chanoir, La Baule, France
- 2018 - Broken minds, clever hands, La Celle-Saint-Cloud, France
- 2019 - Zoo XXL, Lyon
- 2020 - One, Two… Street Art !
- 2021 - Chanoir au MUR, Aix-les-Bains

== Collaboration with brands ==
Amongst his most notable commercial work are:

- the design of a collection for Cacharel at the Galeries Lafayette
- phone cases for Samsung
- a mural fresque for Disney store on the Champs-Élysées.
- decors for the video game Just Dance 2019
- the perfumes Fresh Her and Fresh Him by Ungaro
- artwork collaboration with Rocket League season 21

== Other works ==
Murs libres, a documentary about the street art crew of Barcelona with Jean-Michel Alberola
