= Henri Rivière (painter) =

French artist and designer

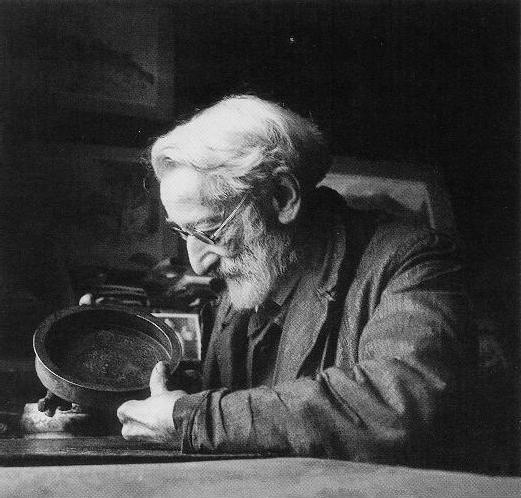
Henri Rivière in late life.

Henri Rivière (March 11, 1864 – August 24, 1951) was a French artist and designer best known for his creation of a form of shadow play at the Chat Noir cabaret, and for his post-Impressionist illustrations of Breton landscapes and the Eiffel Tower.

== Biography ==
=== Early life and education ===
Rivière was born in Paris. His father, Prosper Rivière, was an embroidery merchant from the Pyrénées. His mother, Henriette Thérese Leroux Rivière, was a Parisienne "from a petit bourgeois family". Rivière had one brother, Jules, born 1866.

In 1870, fleeing from the advancing Prussians during the Franco-Prussian War, his father moved the family back to Ax-les-Thermes, his childhood home in the Pyrenees. Rivière's time spent in the rural environment helped develop his love of nature, later a strong theme in his art.

After the war finished in 1871, Rivière returned to Paris with his parents, while his brother remained in Ax to finish his studies. Rivière was enrolled in a boarding-school outside Paris. Rivière's father died in 1873, and his mother was forced to move to a cheaper apartment and send Rivière to a local day school. There, he became friends with Paul Signac, with whom he would later study art .

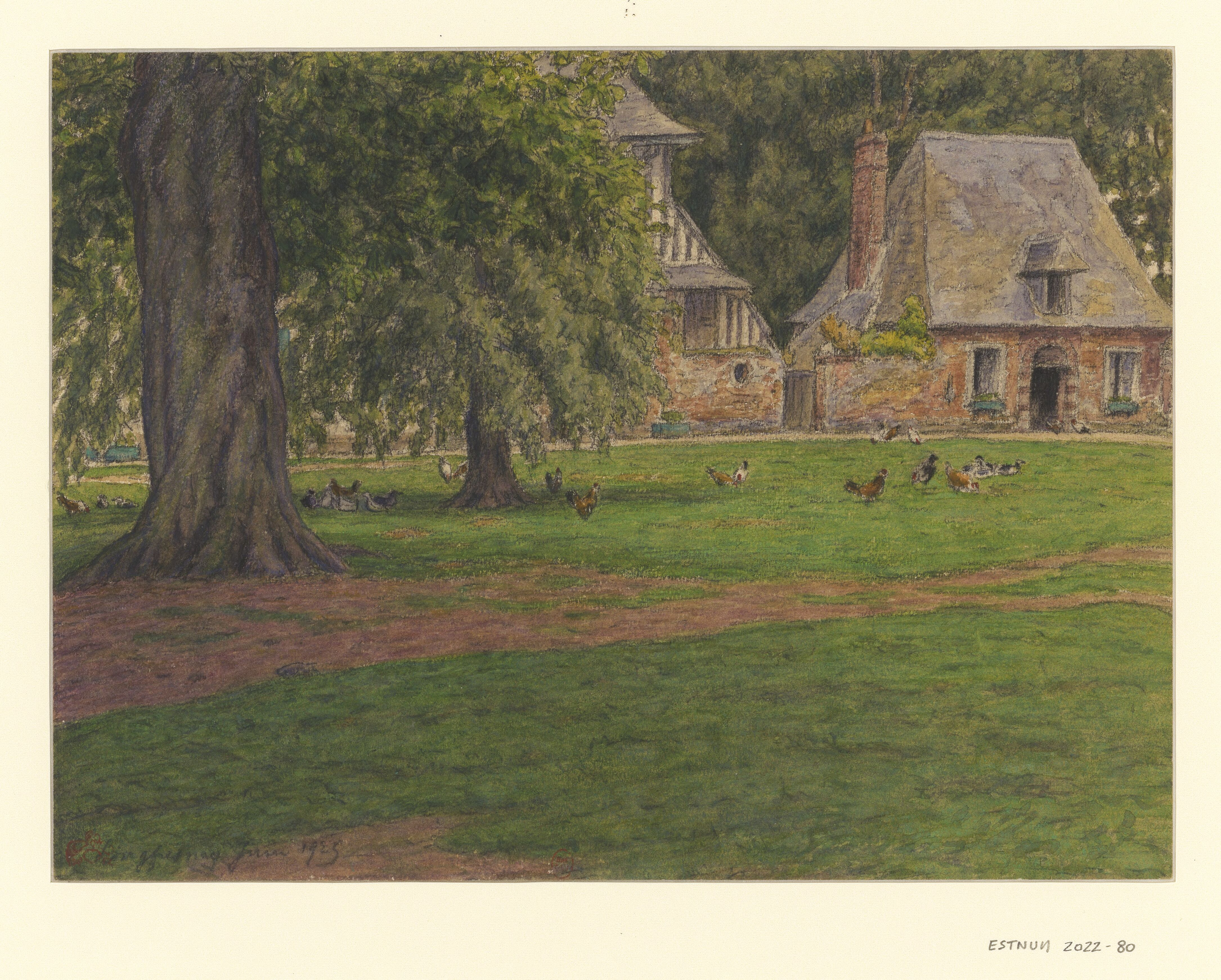
Long Fresnay, 1925

Rivière's mother remarried, and as circumstances improved, Rivière went to a new school and excelled in reading and painting, reading Victor Hugo, Jules Verne and showing an early interest in art, especially Impressionism.

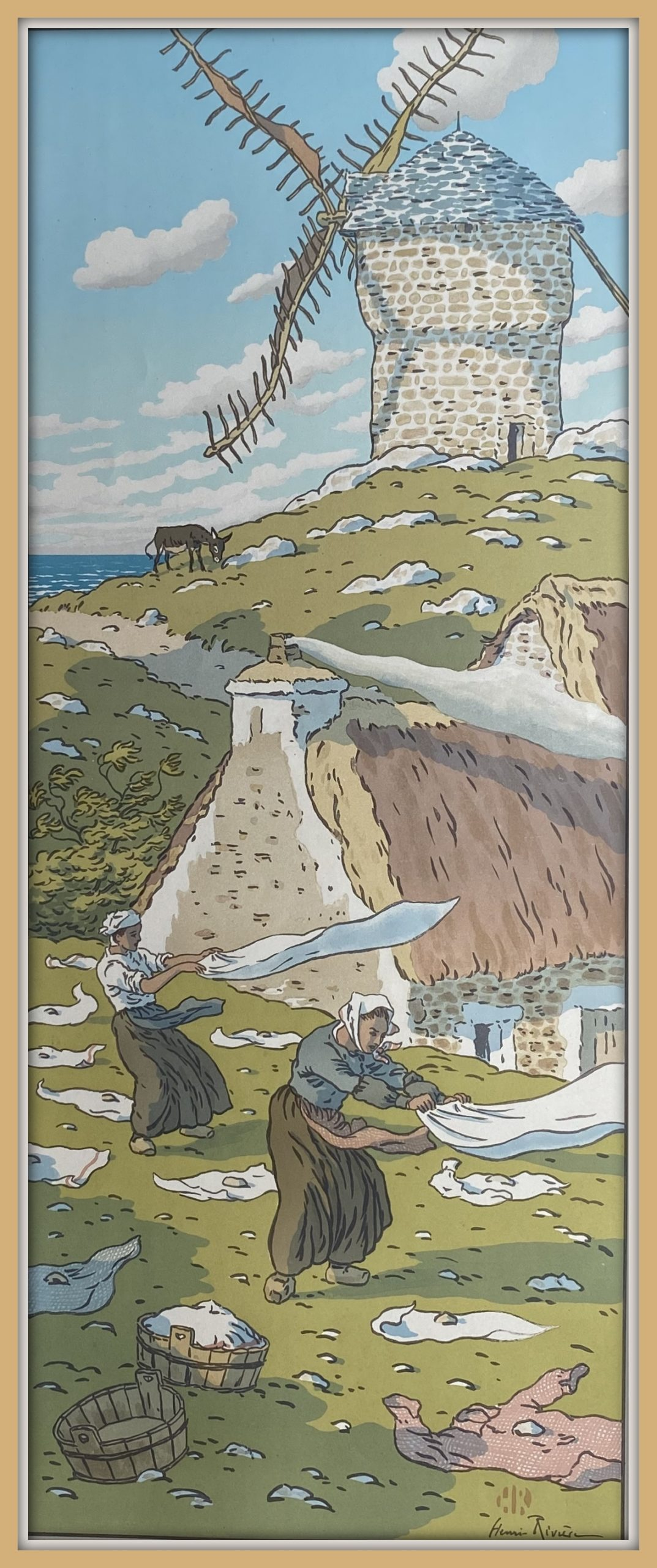
Le Vent, chromolithograph from The Magic Hours (1901-1902)

After working for one week at an ostrich-feather importation business, a job his mother had arranged for him, he left work and went to paint at the Butte Montmartre, a habit he had developed. His mother, frustrated with Rivière, complained to his step-father, who spoke to his friend and art teacher, Emile Bin. Bin, after seeing Rivière's work, offered to teach him and Rivière began his formal training at Bin's studio.

=== Chat Noir and development of work ===
From 1880, he was contributing illustrations to magazines and journals. Rivière was introduced to the cabarets in Montmartre by Paul Signac, especially the popular Chat Noir (Black Cat) café. From 1882, Rivière worked as part of the editorial team on the weekly Chat Noir journal, which published light verse, short stories and illustrations. Rivière edited and contributed art and reviews to the journal until 1885.

In 1888, Riviére met Eugenie Estelle Ley, who he would spend the rest of his life with.

That year Sigfried Bing began publishing the journal Le Japon Artistique, which inspired Riviére to begin collecting Japanese art and teaching himself to make woodblock prints in the Japanese method. Riviére made his own cutting tools, mixed his own inks and did the printing himself.

== Shadow plays ==
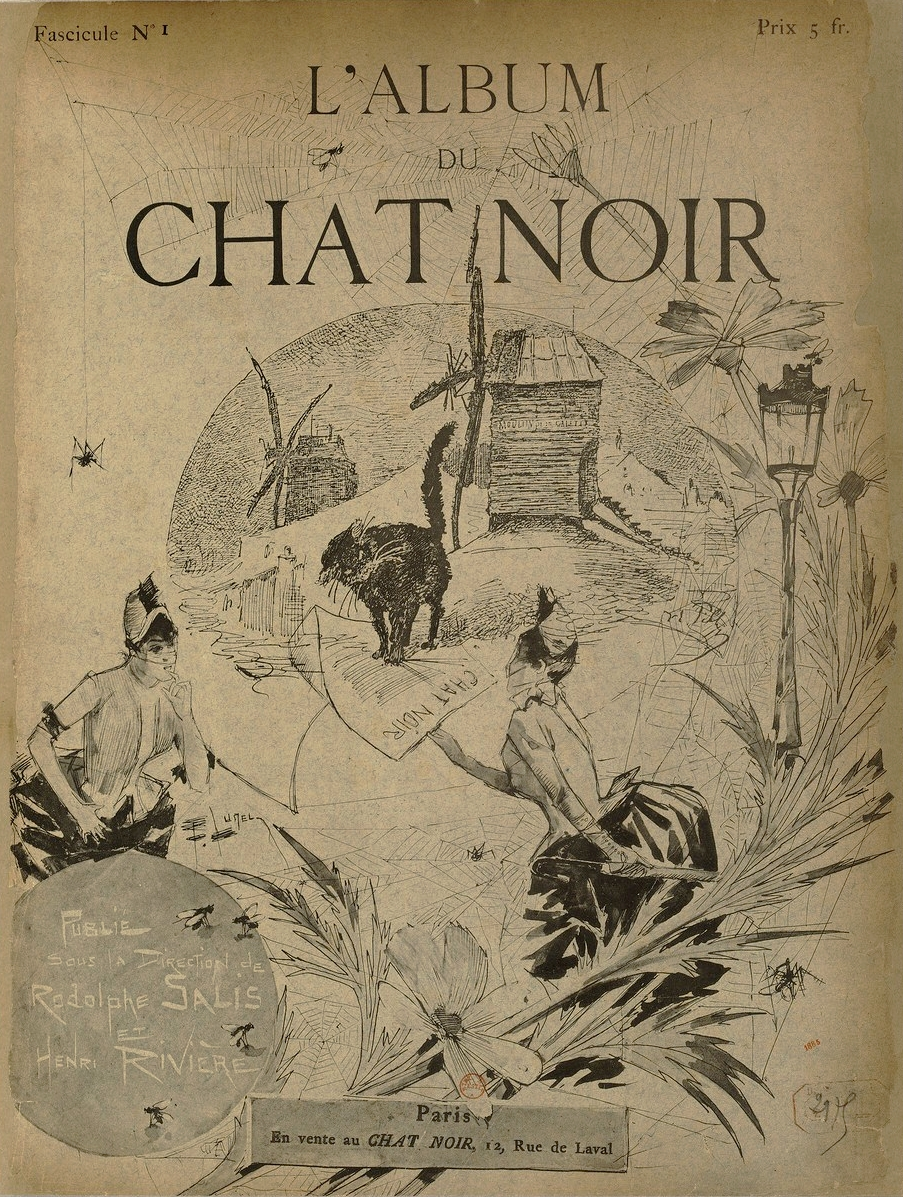
L'album du Chat Noir, 1882

In 1886 Rivière created a form of shadow theatre at the Chat Noir under the name "ombres chinoises". This was a notable success, lasting for a decade until the cafe closed in 1897. He used back-lit zinc cut-out figures which appeared as silhouettes. Rivière was soon joined by Caran d'Ache and other artists, initially performing d'Ache's drama L’Epopee. From 1886 to 1896, Rivière created 43 shadow plays on a great variety of subjects from myth, history and the Bible. He collaborated with many different artists and writers, but made the illustrations for only 9 of the productions himself. He concentrated on improving the technical aspects of the production using enamelling and lighting to create extremely delicate effects of light and colour. The Ombres evolved into numerous theatrical productions and had a major influence on phantasmagoria.

According to historians Phillip Cate and Mary Shaw, Rivière's work involved both aesthetic and technical innovations,

Essentially, Rivière created a system in which he placed silhouettes of figures, animals, elements of landscapes, and so forth, within a wooden framework at three distances from the screen: the closest created an absolutely black silhouette, and the next two created gradations of black to gray, thus suggesting recession into space. Silhouettes could be moved across the screen on runners within the frame.

Along with d'Ache's L’Epopee, Rivière's own works Le Temptation de Saint Antoine (1887) and La Marche a L'etoile (1890), were the most successful and popular. Rivière's shadow theatre was the cabaret's greatest attraction and "played a crucial role in establishing the credibility of the cabaret with that other tier of the avant-garde, the Impressionists/Post Impressionists: Edgar Degas, Camille Pissarro, Claude Monet, Mary Cassatt, and others."

== Prints ==
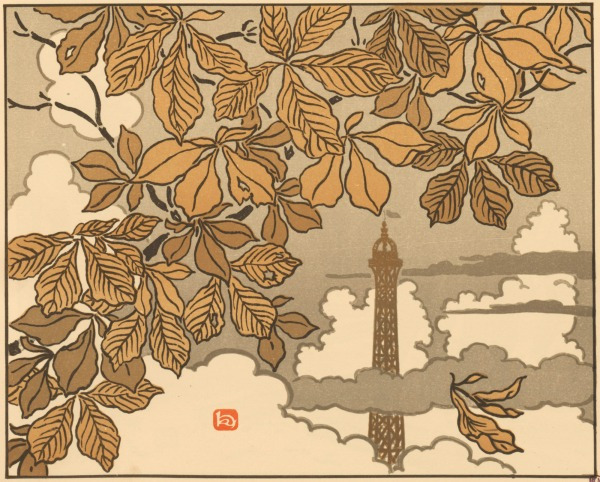
Plate One of the 36 Views of the Eiffel Tower

Between 1882 and 1886 Rivière created a large number of etchings. He also showed an interest in photography, making a series of picturesque scenes of everyday life. He later experimented with colour woodcuts and chromolithography in the late 1880s. Rivière first visited Brittany in 1884, spending most of his summers there until 1916. Together with bustling Parisian life, rural Brittany constituted the majority of the subjects of his landscape works.

Rivière’s prints were generally intended to be published as collections. These include forty images used in Breton Landscapes, created between 1890 and 1894. He also made colour woodcuts for The Sea: Studies of Waves, and prepared other sequences that remained unfinished, including 36 Views of the Eiffel Tower, which were eventually published as lithographs. These were influenced by the vogue for Japonisme at the time, modernising the famous prints by Hiroshige and Hokusai of 36 Views of Mount Fuji.

His colour lithographic series' include:

- The Aspects of Nature (1897 to 1899), 16 images
- The Beautiful Land of Brittany (1897 to 1917), 20 images
- Parisian Landscapes (1900), 8 images
- The Magic Hours (1901 to 1902), 16 images
- Thirty-Six Views of the Eiffel Tower (1902), 36 images
- The Noirot Wind (1906), 4 images

Rivière ceased making prints in 1917, effectively retiring as a professional artist, but continued to work on watercolours in his later years. He died on August 24, 1951.
