= Rodolphe Salis =

French theatre director (1851–1897)

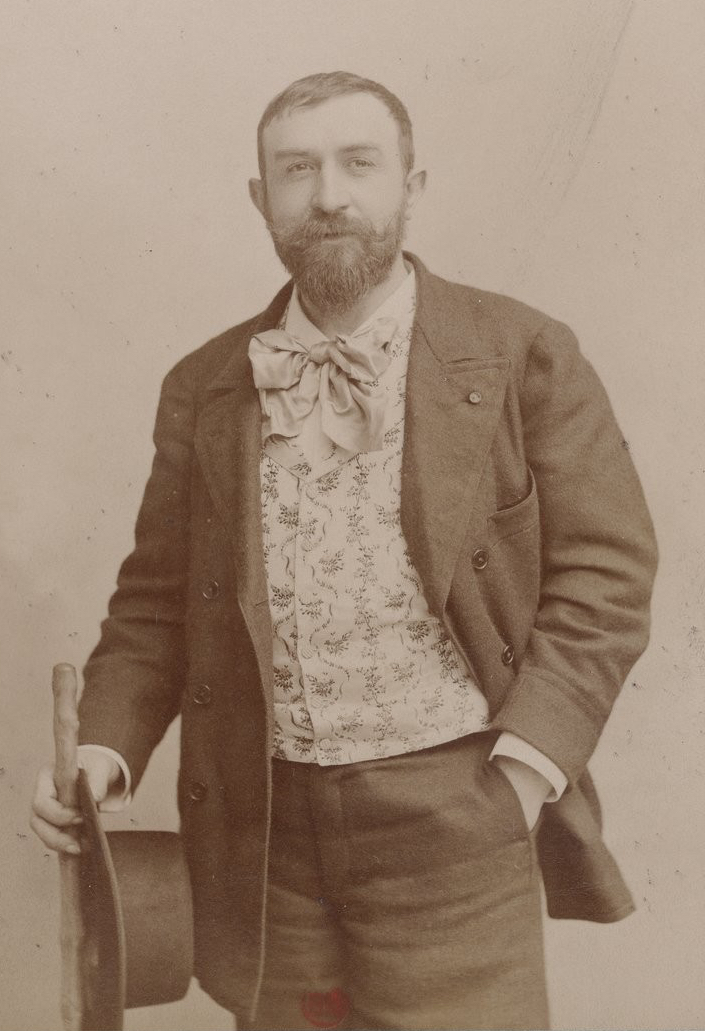
- Born: Constant Maximin Rodolphe Salis; 29 May 1851; Châtellerault, Vienne, France
- Died: 20 March 1897 (aged 45); Naintré, Vienne, France
- Known for: Le Chat Noir

Constant Maximin Rodolphe Salis (French pronunciation: [sali]; 29 May 1851 – 20 March 1897) was a French theatre director who was the creator, host and owner of the Le Chat Noir ('The Black Cat') cabaret (known briefly in 1881 at its beginning as Cabaret Artistique) in the Montmartre district of Paris. With this establishment, Salis is remembered as the creator of the modern cabaret: a nightclub where the patrons could sit at tables with alcoholic drinks and enjoy variety acts on a stage, introduced by a master of ceremonies who interacted with the audience.

== Biography ==
The son of a distiller in Châtellerault, Salis came to Paris in 1872, after leaving the regiment in which he had undertaken military service. He moved into the Hôtel de Rome on Rue de Seine, in the Latin Quarter.

He founded L'école vibrante ('The Vibrant School'), soon renamed the L'école iriso-subversive de Chicago ('The Chicago Iriso-Subversive School') in order to draw attention to his artistic group. In fact, he was earning a living by making Stations of the Cross and other religious objects, that he and his friends painted.

"In fact, it [the school] had the overall intended, but not admitted, immediate aim of making a series of Stations of the Cross to sell at eight and fourteen francs each, in a shop selling religious articles in the Saint Sulpice. The very tedious work was divided between the four 'students' according to their different natures. Rene Gilbert painted heads; Wagner hands; Antonio de La Gandara draperies; Salis, finally, backgrounds and landscapes ...."

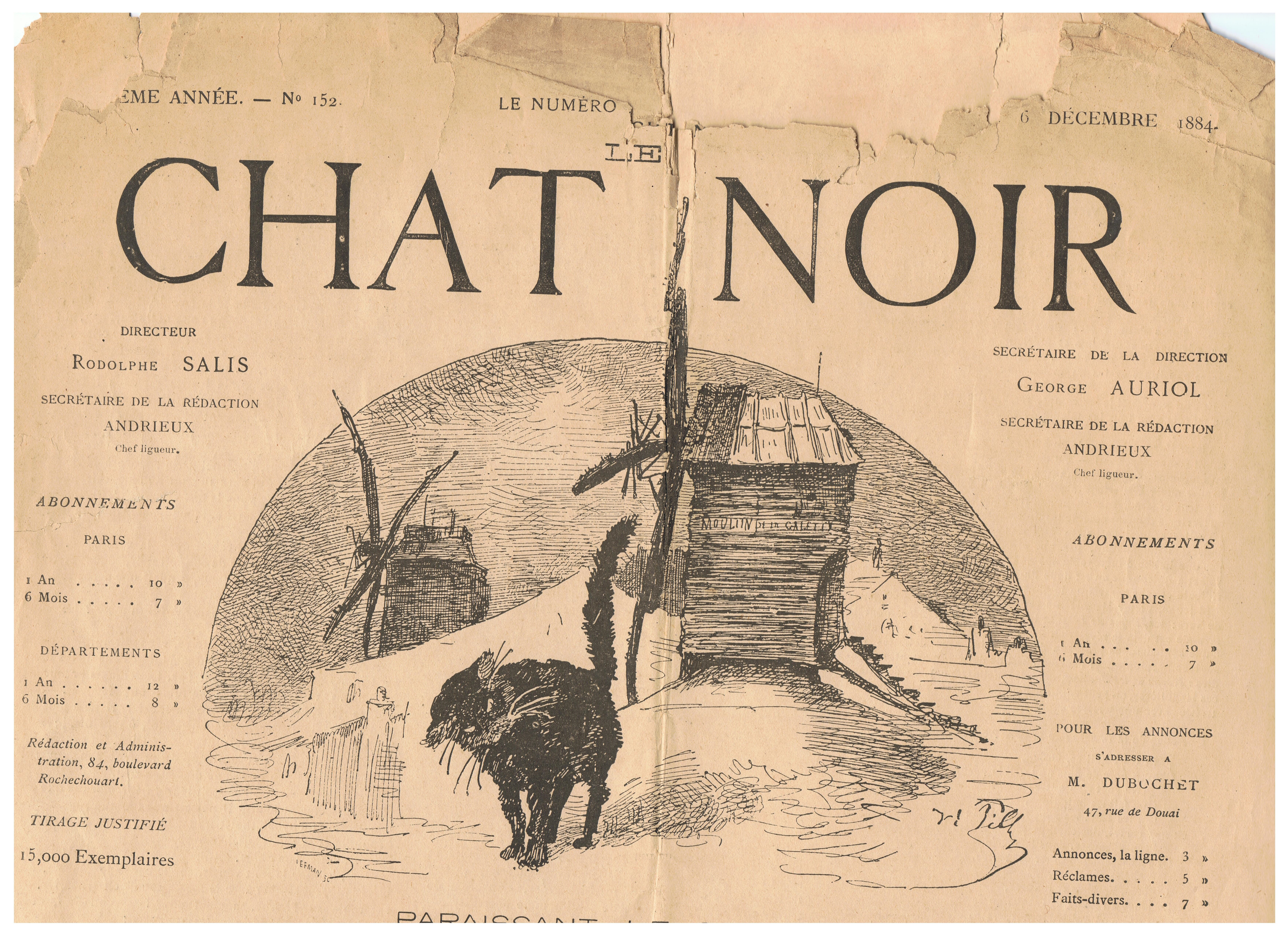
Chat Noir journal, number 152, 6 Decembre 1884.

In order to combine art and alcoholic beverage, Salis had the idea of creating a café in "the purest style of Louis XII ... with a chandelier of wrought iron from the Byzantine period, and where the gentry, the burghers and peasants are now invited to drink absinthe after the usual manner of Victor Hugo and Garibaldi, and hypocras in golden bowls". In reality, the first tavern called Le Chat Noir ('The Black Cat'), opened in November 1881 in a two-room building at 84 Boulevard Rochechouart (a site now commemorated by a plaque), served bad wine, and had rather inferior décor. But from the first, guests were greeted at the door by a Swiss guard, splendidly bedecked and covered with gold from head to foot, supposedly responsible for bringing in the painters and poets who arrived, while barring the "infamous priests and the military". Salis's tongue-in-cheek admirational piece was on a high marble fireplace: The Skull of Louis XIII as a Child.

The first site's success was assured with the wholesale arrival of a group of radical young writers and artists called Les Hydropathes ('those who are afraid of water'), led by the journalist Emile Goudeau. The group claimed to be averse to water, preferring wine and beer. Goudeau's club first met in his house on the Rive Gauche (left bank), but had become so popular that it outgrew its meeting place.

Le Chat Noir also soon outgrew its first site. On 10 June 1885, with great fanfare, Salis moved to new premises located 12 Rue Victor-Masse (which before 1885 had been 12 Rue de Laval). Very quickly, poets and singers who performed at The Black Cat found the best practice for their craft to be had in Paris. Le Chat Noir eventually closed down in 1896.

Salis acted as impresario and (along with cabaret singer Aristide Bruant) as emcee or conférencier. The greetings from Salis rang out often at the expense of customers. Those who left early were insulted, and those who arrived late were banished to a corner. Salis would arrest a customer with a "Well, you're finally out of prison?" or comment "What have you done with your chick from yesterday?" to a new client obviously accompanied by his wife. One evening, the future British king Edward VII was addressed by Salis: "Well, look here: it looks like the Prince of Wales all pissed!"

Every Friday, luncheon was an opportunity to prepare for performances and the editing of a humorous magazine. With legendary stinginess, Salis found every excuse for not paying his staff, suppliers and artists. With some success he even asked to be paid by those whom he hosted at The Black Cat. But his patter to the guests and his organizational skills and personality attracted exceptional artists of all kinds, and a large crowd. The combination of a bar with entertainment (now the standard cabaret theme), was novel. In addition, Salis had the idea of playing music in his tavern by installing a piano, at that time an innovation which was soon banned for a while in newer establishments, and which thereafter allowed him to gain an advantage over the competition.

"Male, square-shouldered, red hair dyed vermilion", Salis was described by Laurent Tailhade, "ageless, though stout, his face channelled by many wrinkles, his chest in a romantic doublet whose floral satin contrasted with the sobriety of a dark coat. Intact, his tawny hair was consistent with his coppery beard and gave him the air of a Flemish trooper .... [He had] a bronze baritone, emphatic, biting and sarcastic, whose thunders cynically put down the Philistines .... [He had] a prodigiously charlatan nature."

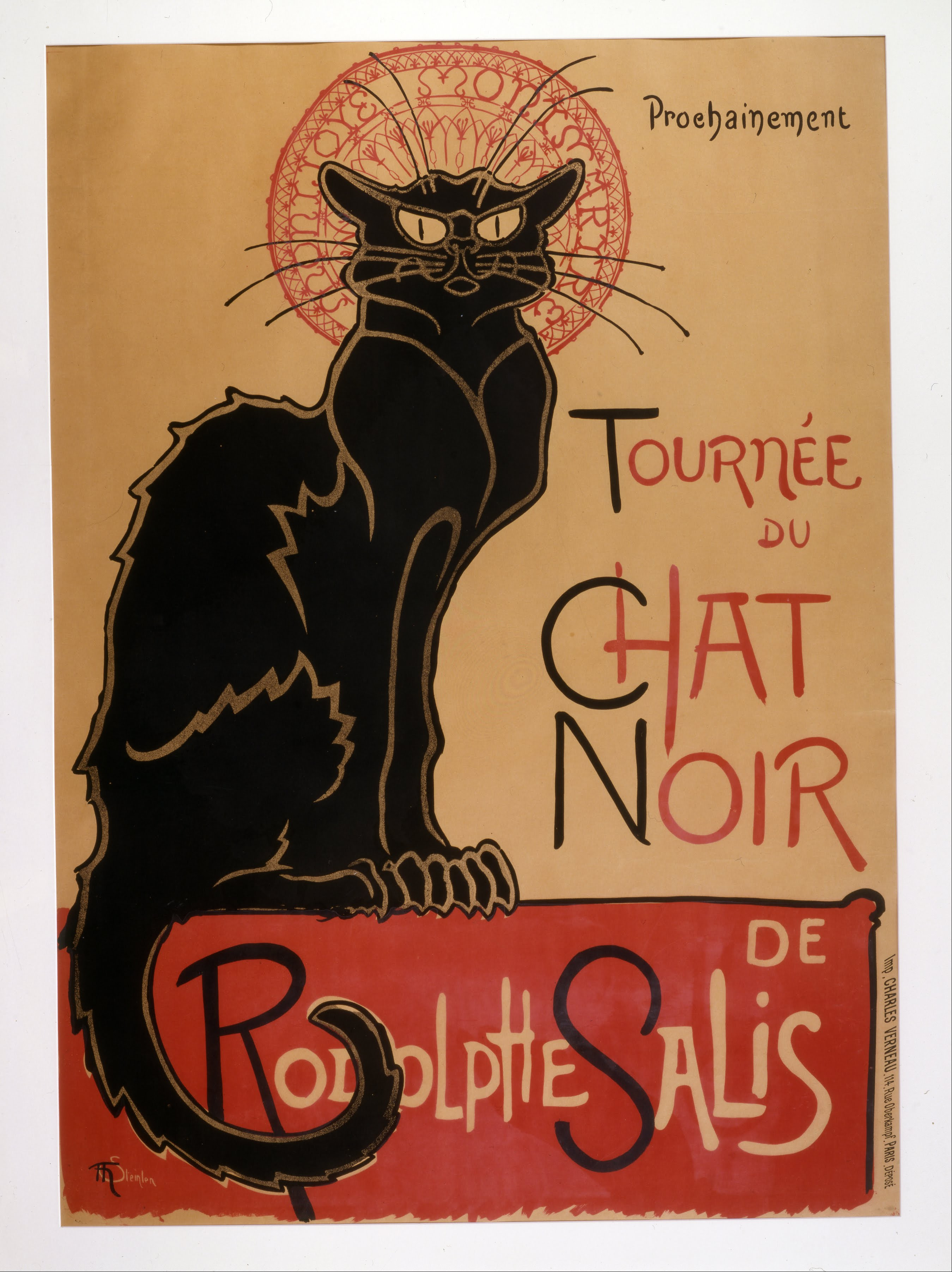
Now-iconic poster by Theophile-Alexandre Steinlen, advertising the approaching tour of The Black Cat show, 1896.

In the 1890s, Salis took his Black Cat entertainment company touring through France, hiring theatres and venues, a practice that was not current at that time. He often refused, under various pretexts, to pay a venue's hire charge.

Salis died in Naintré in 1897. A decade later, a third Le Chat Noir was opened in 1907 at 68 Boulevard de Clichy.

== Tributes ==
- In the department of Vienne to: Châtellerault Naintré Marigny-Brizay a street bears his name.
- 18 Boulevard de Clichy in Paris bears a plaque: "Here was the tomb of the Black Cat founded by Rodolphe Salis ...."
