= Maria Poiret =

Russian actress, composer, singer and poet (1863–1933)

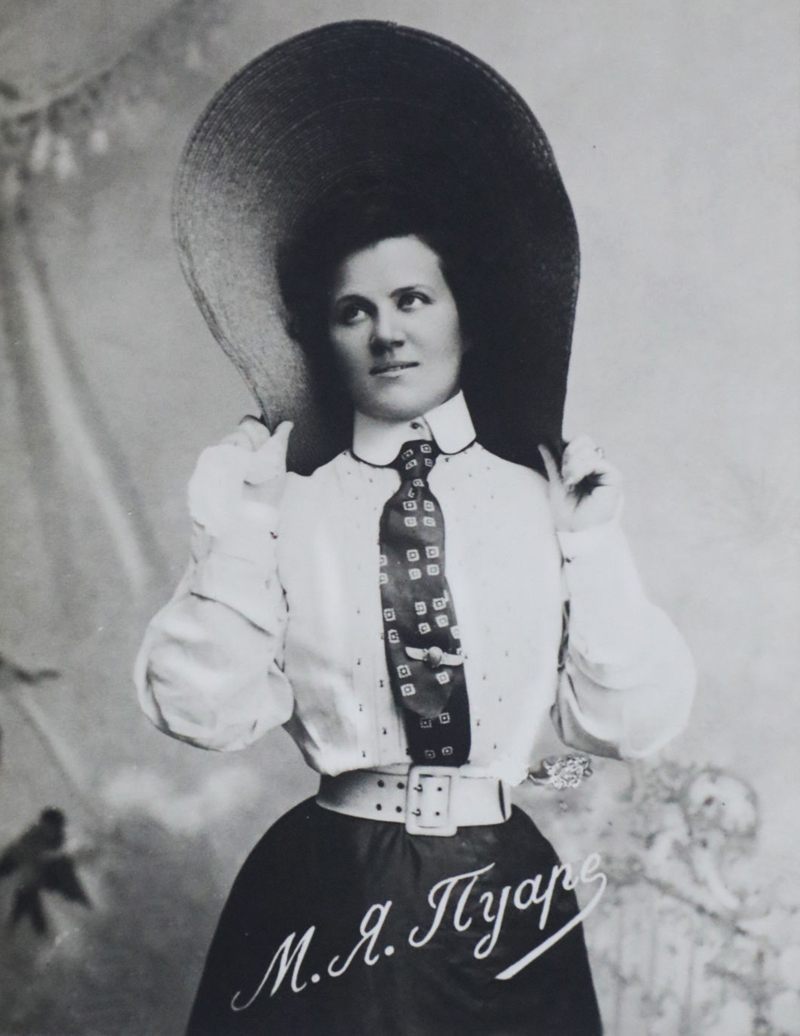

Maria Yakovlevna Orlova-Davydova (Russian: Мари́я Я́ковлевна Орло́ва-Давы́дова; previously Sveshnikova [Све́шникова], née Poiret [Пуаре́]; January 4, 1863 in Moscow – October 13, 1933 in Moscow), also known by stage name Marusina (Russian: Мару́сина), was a Russian actress, composer, singer and poet. She is the author of the romance "I Was Going Home".

== Biography ==
She was born in the family of a fencing and gymnastics teacher Yakov Viktorovich Poiret (1826–1877) and the daughter of a cloth manufacturer Yulia Andreevna Tarasenkova (1830–1871). Her elder brother Emmanuel emigrated to France in his youth and became a well-known cartoonist under the pseudonym Caran d'Ache. She lost her parents early and was raised by her uncle. At the age of 16, she married engineer Mikhail Sveshnikov (died 1913), who was much older than his wife and did not share her passion for art. Soon, Maria experienced a nervous breakdown, as a result of which she was placed in a psychiatric hospital, from where she was rescued by the entrepreneur M. V. Lentovsky.

Since 1880, she began her career as an actress, taking the pseudonym Marusina. In 1880–1890, she participated in Lentovsky's projects, performed in operettas and vaudeville, often playing male roles (Caprice in Le voyage dans la lune by Jacques Offenbach, etc.), sang gypsy romances. Lentovsky himself considered Maria a gypsy by nature, according to him, this was indicated by "her ability to enjoy freedom, her carelessness, indifference to things, her readiness for a nomadic life". The strength and sincerity of feelings, incendiary temperament made her a gypsy.

Since 1890, she performed on the stage of the Alexandrinsky Theatre in vaudeville and light comedies; in 1898–1900, at the Moscow Maly Theatre. In 1901, she owned her own melodrama theatre in the Aquarium Garden, for which she composed the romance "Swan Song", which quickly became popular.

In 1904, she went to the Russo-Japanese War as a correspondent for Novoye Vremya and lived in Port Arthur for several months. Returning, she was ill with typhoid fever.

In 1914 she married Count Alexei Orlov-Davydov. In 1915 she was arrested, being accused by her husband of unfaithfulness, as a result of which consent was obtained for marriage, feigning pregnancy and trying to pass off someone else's newborn child as her own. The trial became one of the most high-profile cases of the time. Maria was acquitted in a criminal case, but the fact of the substitution of the child was proven.

In Soviet times, she lived in Moscow in poverty. She died in 1933, aged 70.

== Literature ==
- Countess Marusya: The fate of the artist Marie Poiret / E. Ukolova, V. Ukolov. - M .: Publishing House of the International Fund for the Humanities Initiatives, 2002.
