= Le Chat Noir =

Entertainment establishment in Montmartre, Paris (1881-1897)

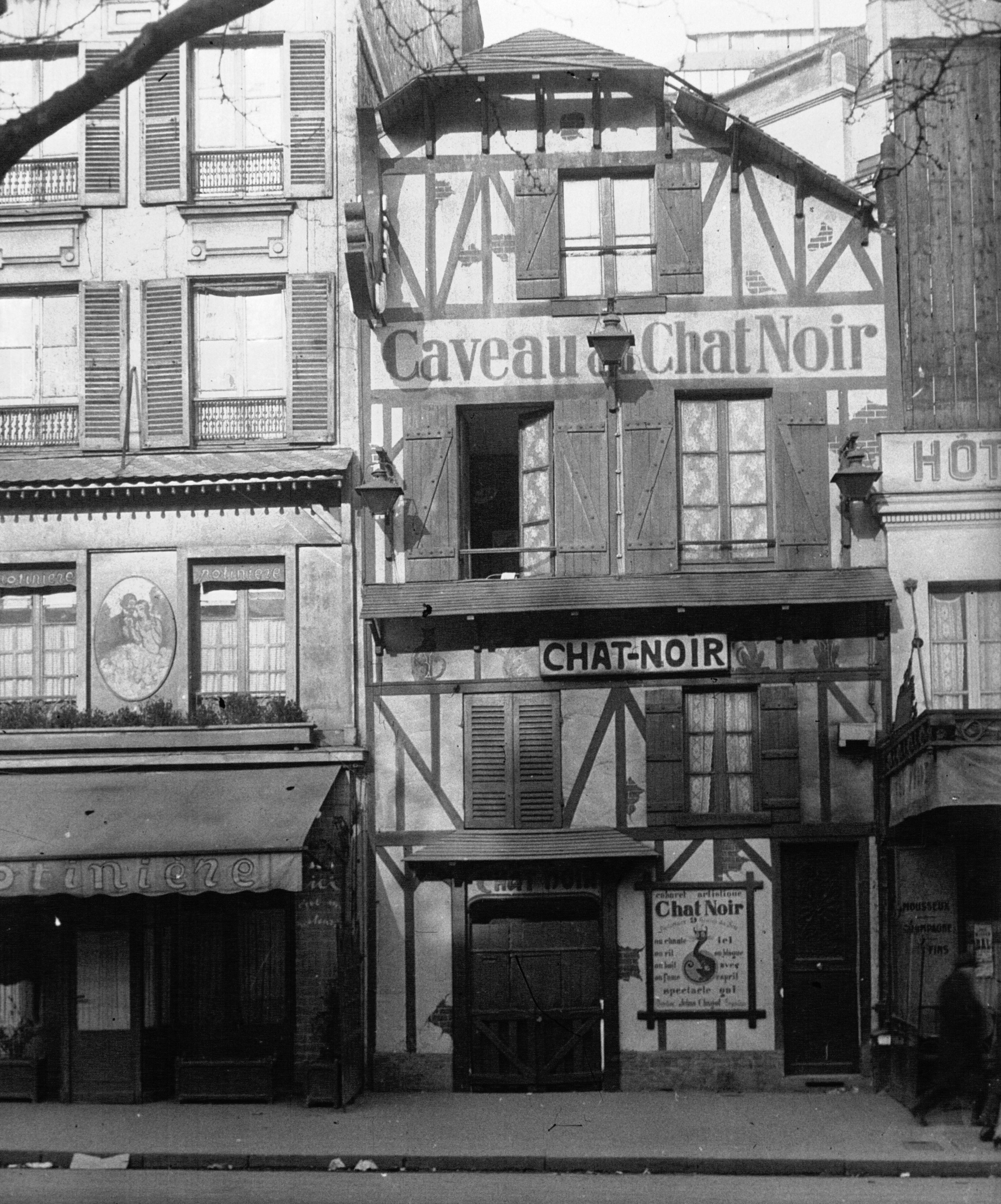
- Third location of Le Chat Noir at Boulevard de Clichy 68 (1929)
- Interactive map of Le Chat Noir
- Location: Paris, France
- Coordinates: 48°53′01″N 2°20′03″E

Construction
- Opened: 18 November 1881

Website
- Edit this at Wikidata

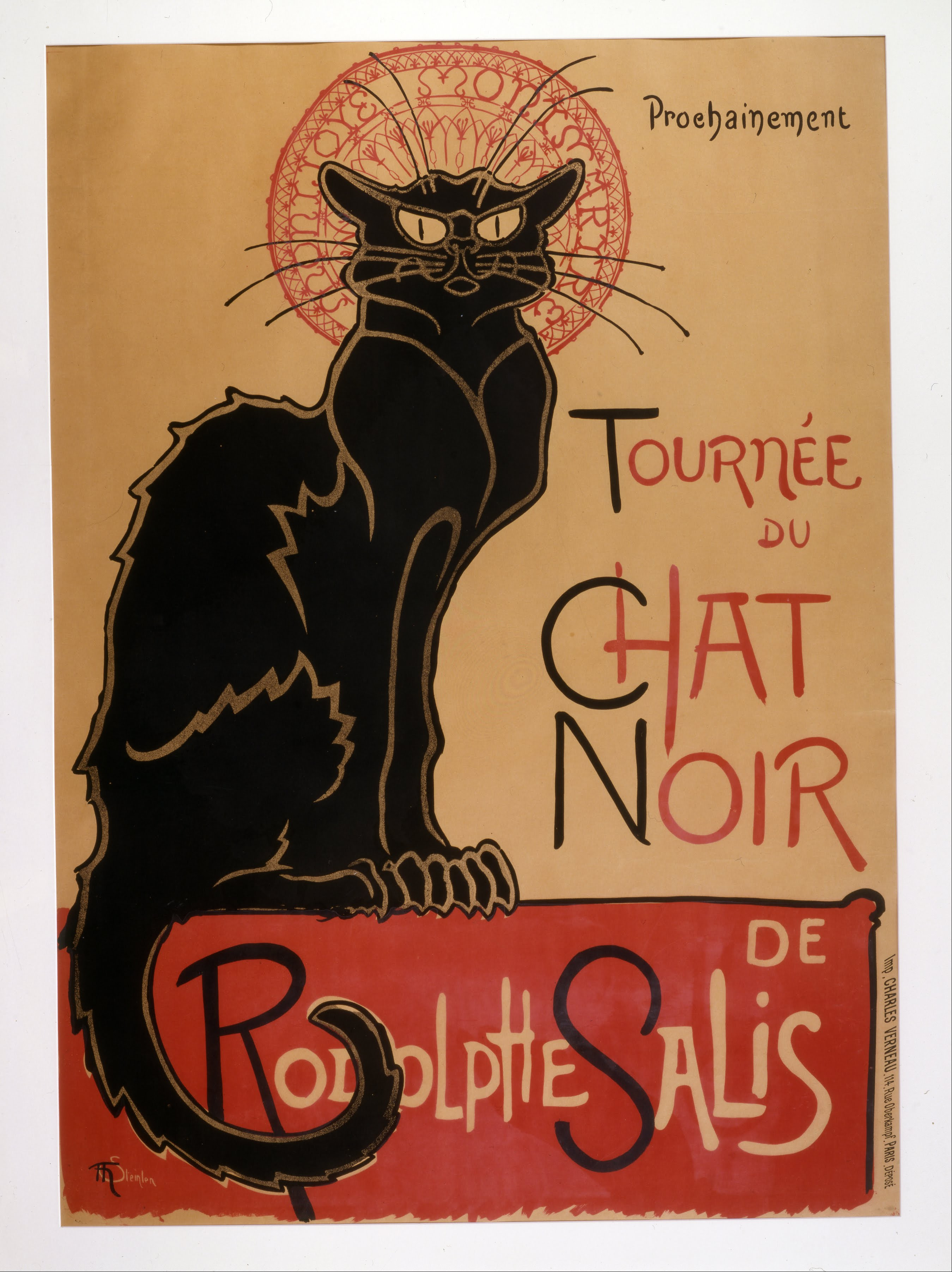
Théophile Steinlen's 1896 poster advertising a tour to other cities ("coming soon") of Le Chat Noir's troupe of cabaret entertainers

Le Chat Noir (French pronunciation: [lə ʃa nwaʁ]; French, 'The Black Cat') was a 19th century entertainment establishment in the bohemian Montmartre district of Paris. It was opened on 18 November 1881 by impresario Rodolphe Salis, and closed in 1897 not long after Salis' death.

Le Chat Noir is thought to be the first modern cabaret: a nightclub where the patrons sat at tables and drank alcoholic beverages while being entertained by a variety show on stage. The acts were introduced by a master of ceremonies who interacted with well-known patrons at the tables. Its imitators have included cabarets from St. Petersburg (Stray Dog Café) to Barcelona (Els Quatre Gats) to London's The Cave of the Golden Calf.

In its heyday it was a bustling nightclub that was part artist salon, part rowdy music hall. From 1882 to 1895 the cabaret published a weekly magazine with the same name, featuring literary writings, news from the cabaret and Montmartre, poetry, and political satire. It was the subject of an iconic Théophile Steinlen poster in 1896.

== Early history ==
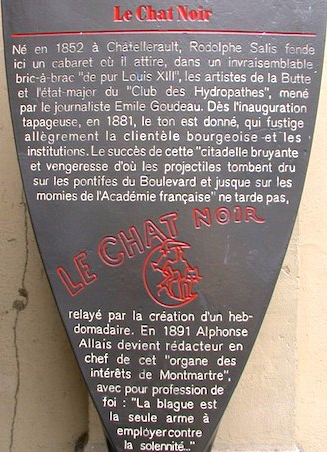
Le Chat Noir Cabaret original location at Boulevard Rochechouart 84

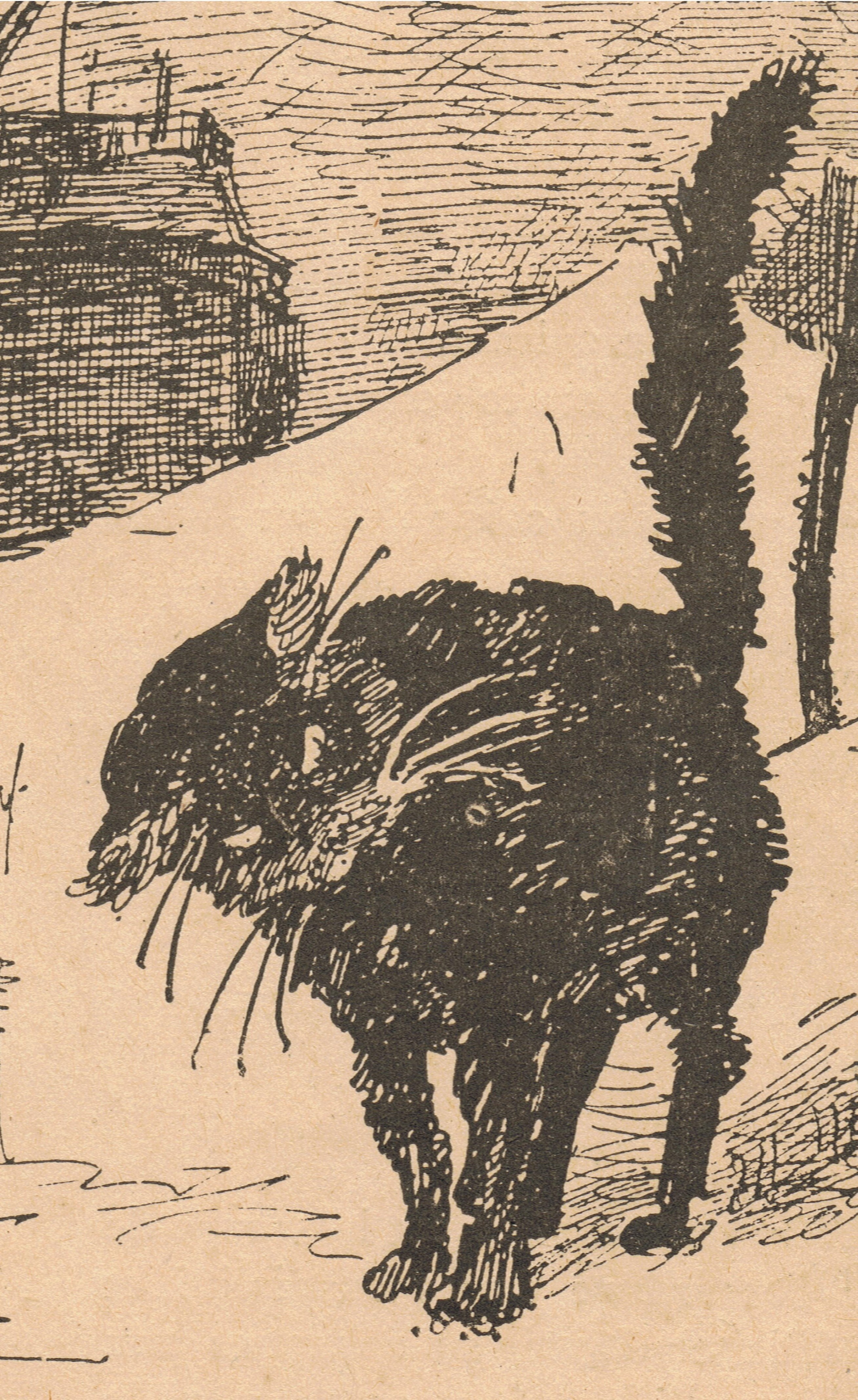
Detail from Le Chat Noit journal (number 152, 6 December 1884)

The cabaret was founded at Boulevard de Rochechouart 84 by Rodolphe Salis at the foot of Montmartre in 1881. The black cat was an artistic reference to Paris, where stray and meowing cats roamed especially at night. Between 1868 and 1869 Champfleury dedicated an entire book to domestic cats Les Chats: histoire, mœurs, anecdotes. The book was illustrated with engraved drawings by Eugène Delacroix, Édouard Manet, Prosper Mérimée, and Hokusai, becoming a popular success.

The success of the cabaret was assured with the wholesale arrival of a group of radical young writers and artists called 'The Hydropathes' ("those who are afraid of water – so they drink only wine"), a club led by the journalist Émile Goudeau. The group claimed to be averse to water, preferring wine and beer. Their name doubled as a nod to the "rabid" devotion with which they advocated their sociopolitical and aesthetic agendas. Goudeau's club met in his house on the Rive Gauche ('Left Bank'), but had become so popular that it outgrew its meeting place. Salis met Goudeau, whom he convinced to relocate the club meeting place across the river on Rue de Laval, now Rue Victor-Massé.

== Second site ==
Le Chat Noir soon outgrew its first site. In June 1885, three and a half years after opening, it moved to larger accommodations at Rue Victor-Massé 12. The new venue was the sumptuous old private mansion of the Belgian painter Alfred Stevens, who, at Salis' request, transformed it into a "fashionable country inn" with the help of the architect Maurice Isabey.

Soon a growing crowd of poets and singers was gathering at Le Chat Noir, which offered an ideal venue and opportunity to practice their acts before fellow performers, guests and colleagues.

With exaggerated, ironic politeness, Salis most often played the role of conférencier (post-performance lecturer, or master of ceremonies). It was here that the Salon des Arts Incohérents ('Salon of Incoherent Arts'), shadow plays, and comic monologues got their start.

Famous men and women to patronise Le Chat Noir included Jane Avril, Franc-Nohain, Adolphe Willette, Caran d'Ache, André Gill, Émile Cohl, Paul Bilhaud, Sarah England, Amy Levy, Paul Verlaine, Henri Rivière, Claude Debussy, Erik Satie, Charles Cros, Jules Laforgue, Yvette Guilbert, Charles Moréas, Albert Samain, Louis Le Cardonnel, Coquelin Cadet, Emile Goudeau, Alphonse Allais, Maurice Rollinat, Maurice Donnay, Armand Masson, Aristide Bruant, Théodore Botrel, Paul Signac, Porfirio Pires, August Strindberg, George Auriol, Marie Krysinska, and Henri de Toulouse-Lautrec.

The last shadow play by Salis' company was staged in January 1897, after which Salis took the company on tour. Salis was talking of plans to move the cabaret to a location in Paris itself, but he died on 19 March 1897.

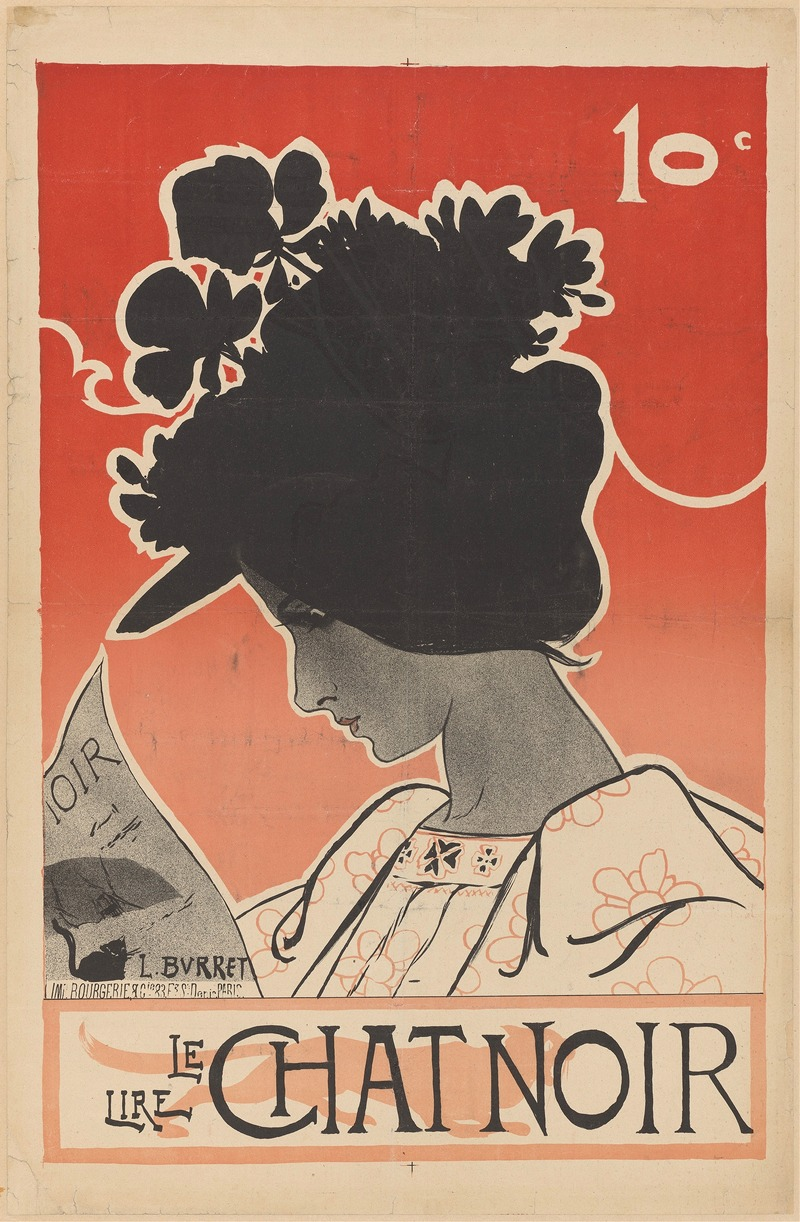
Print for the magazine – Léonce Burret

The death of Rodolphe Salis in 1897 spelt the end of Le Chat Noir. By that time the fascination with Montmartre had already diminished, and Salis had already disposed of many of the club's assets and facilities. Soon after Salis' death, the artists dispersed, and Le Chat Noir slowly disappeared.

== Last location ==
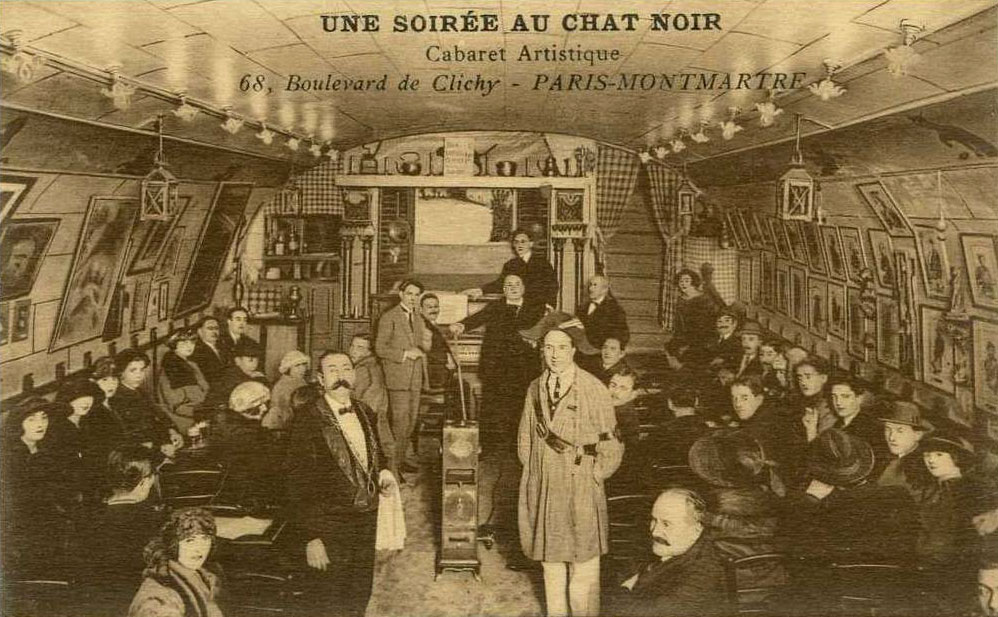
Le Chat Noir (c. 1920)

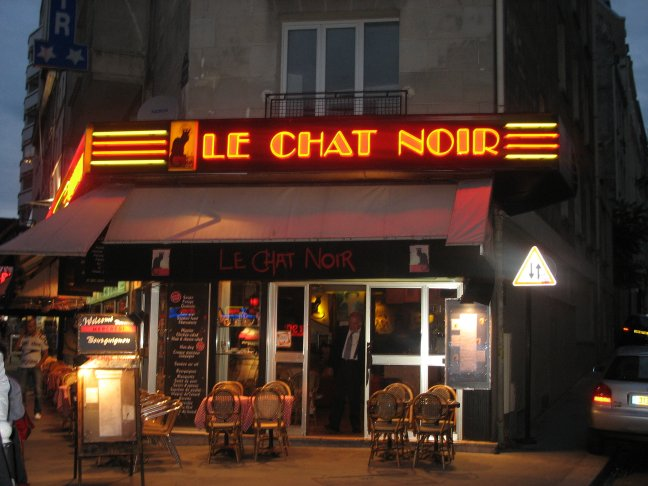
Modern appearance of the last site of Le Chat Noir at Boulevard de Clichy 68 (2007)

Ten years later, in 1907, Jehan Chargot opened an eponymous café in an effort to resurrect, modernise, and continue the work of his illustrious predecessor. This new Chat Noir, located at Boulevard de Clichy 68, remained popular into the 1920s.

Today a neon sign which incorporates Steinlen's iconic Chat Noir image is on display at Boulevard de Clichy 68, now the site of a hotel by the same name.

Other cabarets successfully copied and adapted the model established by Le Chat Noir. In December 1899, Henri Fursy opened his Boîte à Fursy cabaret in the former Chat Noir hotel on Rue Victor-Massé. He claimed to have inherited the mantle of Salis, and said his cabaret "has thanks to Fursy become once again the goal of all who 'climb Montmartre' to hear their favourite chansonniers ('singers')."

== Shadow play ==
From its opening, Le Chat Noir was thought of as a meeting point for artists, with an interior design in the Louis XIII style. In the beginning, poets, musicians, writers and singers performed on the stage, but they were quickly replaced as the shadow play medium developed at Le Chat Noir and spread from there. The cabaret is still remembered for these.

The shadow play had already been established in France in the 18th century and made popular by François Dominique Séraphin, but it had disappeared from the art world during the 19th century. Le Chat Noir was the major cause of the shadow play's renewed popularity in France, as Lotte Reiniger was in Germany by her linking of such shows to the cinema by creating characters from cutout figures and projecting them as shadow puppets.

The birth of the shadow plays in Le Chat Noir took place in a peculiar way. By the end of 1885, the painter Henry Sommer and the illustrator George Auriol built a puppet theatre there, intended for adults-only performances. One day Henri Rivière placed a white napkin in front of the opening of the small puppet theatre and moved a cardboard puppet behind the white screen with lighting from behind, while Jules Jouy sang, accompanying himself on piano. This was the first shadow play in Le Chat Noir.

In 1887 Rivière replaced the puppet theatre with a proper Shadow Theatre, with a 1.1 m × 1.4 m (44 in × 55 in) screen, held by a large frame. Artists such as cartoonist Adolphe Willette, painter Caran d'Ache, Henri Rivière and George Auriol created the cabaret's shadow plays. They used zinc to create the silhouettes of a few characters (although initially they used cardboard), which they used as puppets, projecting their shadow onto a white screen which was illuminated from behind with electric lights. This was an evolutionary development in the art of shadow plays.

Writers who frequented the club wrote stories for the Shadow Theatre that Rodolphe Salis, the owner of the cabaret, would read out loud after the performance. Thanks to the collaboration of many of the artists of that time, the stories were accompanied by some very complex colour, sound, and movement effects, making them more dynamic and exciting, as well as piano accompaniment.

Over an eleven-year span these plays were presented nightly in the shadow theatre, totalling more than forty. The Montmartre museum still has a few zinc shapes that had been used in the plays.

The spread of this type of show became successful because of Théophile Steinlen's poster announcing "la tournée du Chat Noir avec Rodolphe Salis", a Shadow Theatre tour from Le Chat Noir.

Le Chat Noir made many tours with the Shadow Theatre. These started in 1892, basically around France during the summer, although Salis and the company went to Tunis, Algeria, and other French-speaking countries such as Belgium. Some of the artists who played in Salis' performances became so famous that they founded their own cabarets or shows. Le Chat Noir was supposed to have its last show and tour in January 1897, since Salis died just after that. However, it was his wife who took the charge of the cabaret and organised other tours. During these shows, Dominique Bonnaud replaced Salis and became the storyteller. Although he did it well, the quality of the performances declined. By then, other establishments had become popular by copying Le Chat noir's techniques, shows and decor.

Under the management of Rodolphe Salis, Le Chat noir produced 45 théatre d'ombres ('shadow play') shows between 1885 and 1896, as the art became more popular in Europe. Behind a screen on the second floor of the establishment, the artist Henri Rivière worked with up to 20 assistants in a large, oxy-hydrogen backlit performance area and used a double optical lantern to project backgrounds. Originally cardboard cutouts were used, but zinc figures took their place after 1887. Various artists took part in the creation, including Steinlen, Adolphe Willette, and Albert Robida. Caran d'Ache designed around 50 cutouts for the very popular 1888 show L'Epopée.

== Cultural associations ==
- French-Colombian street artist Chanoir chose his nickname in reference to the poster.
- The Le Chat Noir poster can be seen prominently in the crime scene photographs from the 2001 death of Kathleen Peterson.
- The poster for Le Chat Noir can also be seen prominently in the 1961 film Breakfast at Tiffany's hanging on the wall over the staircase.
- Le Chat Noir is the name of the nightclub where Frank Sinatra and Natalie Wood rekindle their relationship in the 1958 film Kings Go Forth. The film also features the famous cat poster with blinking eyes on the entrance wall.
- Le Chat Noir was referenced in the Japanese media franchise Sakura Wars.
- A Le Chat Noir poster can be seen as a background piece in one scene in the 2016 animated film The Secret Life of Pets.
- A Le Chat Noir poster can be seen hanging on the wall of the bedroom of Claire Carlin, played by Maude Apatow, in the 2020 film The King of Staten Island.
- The superhero Chat Noir in the French animated television series Miraculous: Tales of Ladybug & Cat Noir is named after the poster.
