= Caran d'Ache =

Russian-French satirist and political cartoonist (1858-1909)

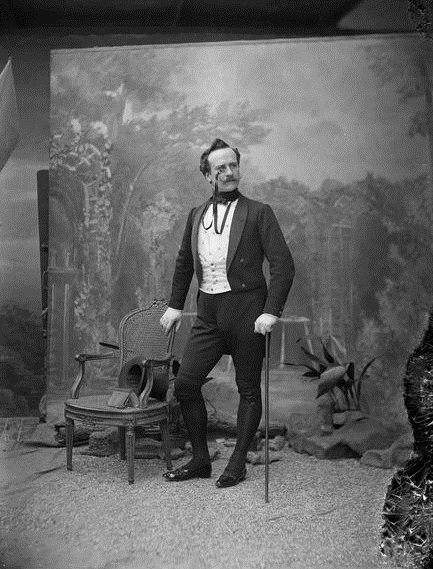
- Photographed 1890 by Atelier Nadar
- Born: Emmanuel Poiré; 6 November 1858 Moscow, Russian Empire
- Died: 25 February 1909 (aged 50) Paris, France
- Pseudonym: Caporal Poiré
- Relatives: Maria Poiret (sister)

Emmanuel Poiré (6 November 1858 – 25 February 1909), known by the pseudonym Caran d'Ache (French: [kaʁɑ̃ daʃ]), was a 19th-century Russian-French satirist and political cartoonist.

While his first work glorified the Napoleonic era, he went on to create "stories without words" and as a contributor to newspapers such as the Le Figaro, he is sometimes hailed as one of the precursors of comic strips.

== Name ==
Emmanuel Poiré initially published his illustrations with military themes under the name Caporal Poiré, but later adopted the pseudonym Caran d'Ache, and it was under this name that his work became well known in France. The pseudonym comes from the Russian word karandash (карандаш) meaning 'pencil', which, attested in Russian from the 16th–17th centuries, is in turn a borrowing from a Turkic language.

When the stationery company Fabrique Genevoise de Crayons Ecridor came under new management in 1924, the company was renamed Caran d'Ache, after Poiré, with a nod to the pseudonym's etymological roots.

== Biography ==
Born in Moscow on 6 November 1858, d'Ache was the grandson of an Officer-Grenadier in Napoleon's Grande Armée who, wounded during the Battle of Borodino, had stayed behind in Russia. After his grandfather's death, he was adopted by a Polish family whose daughter he later married. His younger sister, Maria Poiret, became a famous dancer and actress.

In 1877, he emigrated to France where he gained French citizenship and joined the Army for five years, where he was assigned to design uniforms for the ministry of war. He also contributed to their journal La Vie militaire with satirical illustrations, among them some caricatures of the German army.

In 1898 he co-founded the satirical, anti-Dreyfusard weekly magazine Psst... ! along with fellow artist and designer Jean-Louis Forain. The magazine lasted 85 issues and was made up entirely of editorial cartoons by Caran d'Ache and Forain, caricaturing society and its scandals from an antisemitic, pro-Army viewpoint.

He died in Paris on 25 February 1909 at the age of 50.

== Works ==
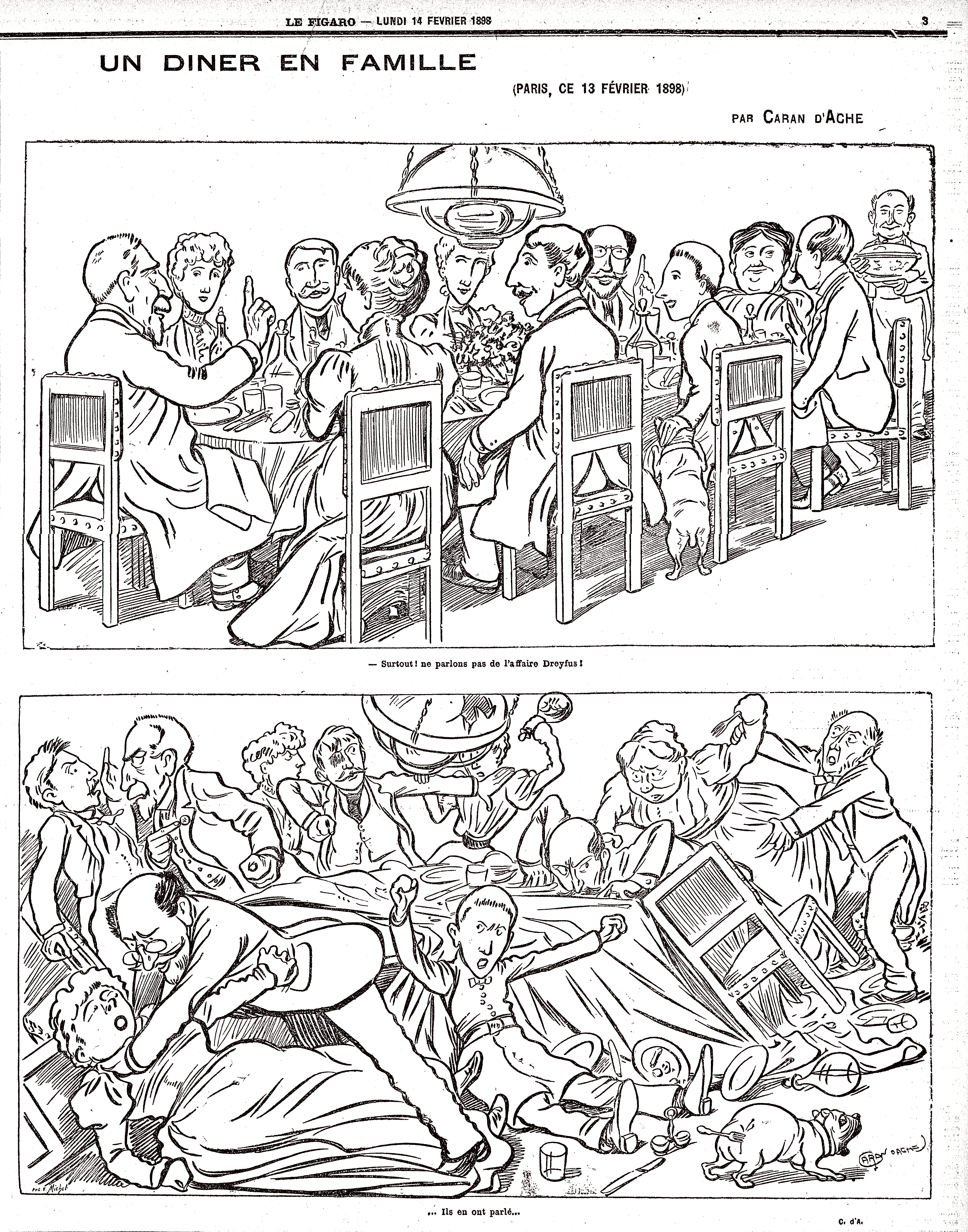
Caran d'Ache's most famous cartoon. The Dreyfus Affair divided the whole of French society. Here, Caran d'Ache depicts a fictional family dinner. At the top, somebody remarks "Above all, let's not discuss the Dreyfus Affair!". At the bottom, the family is fighting and the caption reads, "They discussed it."

Much of his work was contributed to La Vie Parisienne, Le Figaro illustré, La Caricature, and Le Chat Noir. He also issued various albums of sketches and posters, some listed below. and illustrated a good many books, notably Benardaky's Prince Kozakokoff.

- 1880: His first drawings of military caricatures were published in La Chronique Parisienne.
- 1892: Caran d'Ache published Carnet de Chèques ("Checkbook") on the Panama Canal Affair.
- 1895: He started publishing editorial cartoons (every Monday) in the daily Le Figaro, and soon thereafter for the popular weekly Le Rire.
- A poster for an «Exposition Russe» in Paris was published in Les Maîtres de l'Affiche.
- 1898: Caran d'Ache published the cartoon Un diner en famille ("A Family Dinner"), highlighting the intense disagreements in French society regarding the Dreyfus Affair. It appeared a month after Émile Zola's famous J'Accuse, which inflamed and hardened opinion on both sides.
