= Théophile Steinlen =

Swiss-French painter (1859–1923)

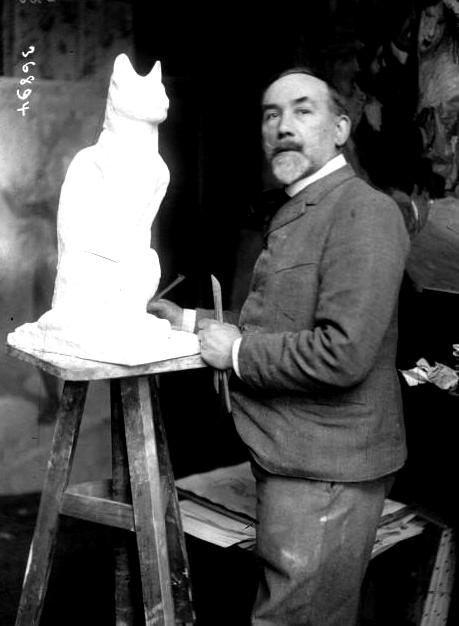
- Théophile-Alexandre Steinlen in his studio (1913)
- Born: 10 November 1859, 20 November 1859; Lausanne
- Died: 13 December 1923; 18th arrondissement of Paris
- Occupations: Painter, illustrator, sculptor, graphic artist, lithographer, designer, printmaker, architectural drafter, visual artist, etcher, drawer, artist

Signature
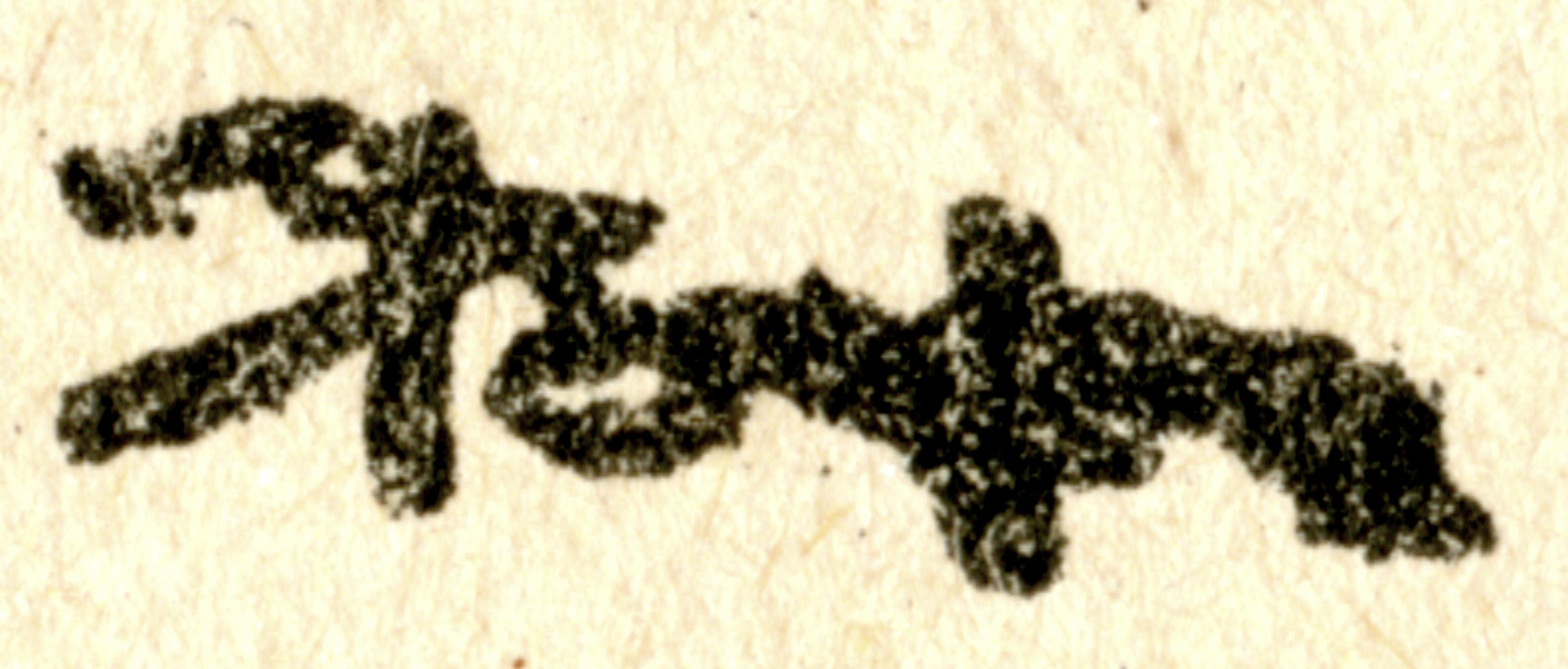

Théophile Alexandre Steinlen (November 10, 1859 – December 13, 1923), was a Swiss-born French Art Nouveau painter and printmaker. He was politically engaged and collaborated with the anarchist and socialist press.

== Biography ==
Born in Lausanne, Switzerland, Steinlen studied at the University of Lausanne before taking a job as a designer trainee at a textile mill in Mulhouse in eastern France. In his early twenties he was still developing his skills as a painter when he and his wife Emilie Mey were encouraged by the painter François Bocion to move to the artistic community in the Montmartre Quarter of Paris. Once there, Steinlen was befriended by the painter Adolphe Willette, who introduced him to the artistic crowd at Le Chat Noir that led to his commissions to do poster art for the cabaret owner and entertainer Aristide Bruant and for other commercial enterprises.

In the early 1890s, Steinlen's paintings of rural landscapes, flowers, and nudes were being shown at the Salon des Indépendants. His 1895 lithograph titled Les Chanteurs des Rues was the frontispiece to a work entitled Chansons de Montmartre published by Éditions Flammarion with sixteen original lithographs that illustrated the Belle Époque songs of Paul Delmet. Five of his posters were published in Les Maîtres de l'Affiche.

His permanent home, Montmartre and its environs, was a favourite subject throughout Steinlen's life and he often painted scenes of some of the harsher aspects of life in the area. His daughter, Colette, was featured in much of his work. In addition to paintings and drawings, he also did sculpture on a limited basis, most notably figures of cats that he had great affection for as seen in many of his paintings. Steinlen included cats in many of his illustrations, and even published a book of his designs, Dessins Sans Paroles Des Chats.

Steinlen became a regular contributor to Le Rire and Gil Blas magazines plus numerous other publications including L'Assiette au Beurre and Les Humouristes, a short-lived magazine he and a dozen other artists jointly founded in 1911. Between 1883 and 1920, he produced hundreds of illustrations, a number of which were done under a pseudonym so as to avoid political problems because of their harsh criticisms of social ills.

Théophile Steinlen died in 1923 in Paris and was buried in the Cimetière Saint-Vincent in Montmartre. A stone monument by Pierre Vannier was created for Steinlen in 1936; it is located in Square Joël Le Tac in Paris.

Today, his works can be found at many museums around the world. His art influenced the work of other artists, including Pablo Picasso.

== Selected works ==
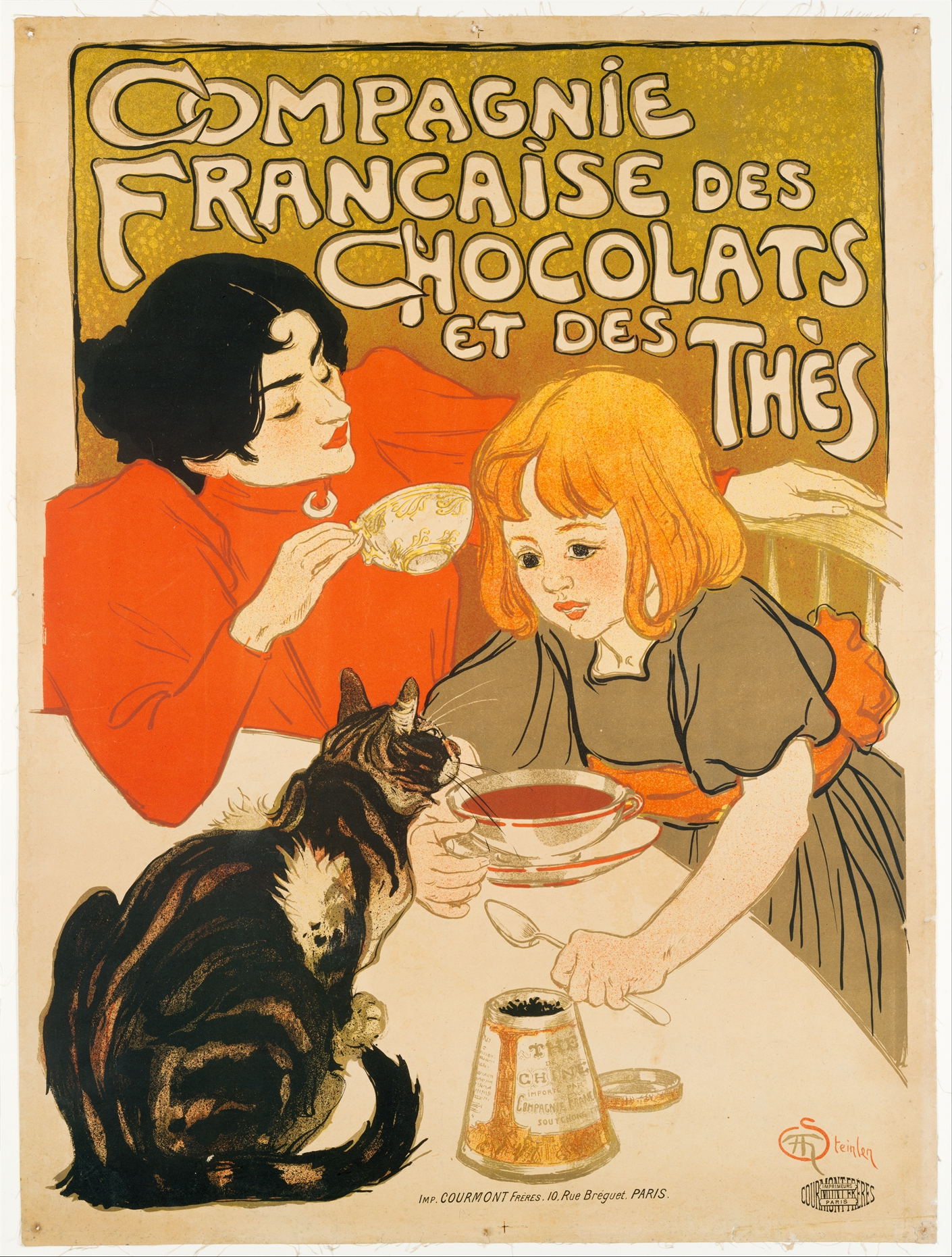
Compagnie Française des Chocolats et des Thès (1895); Steinlen includes his wife and daughter in the illustration

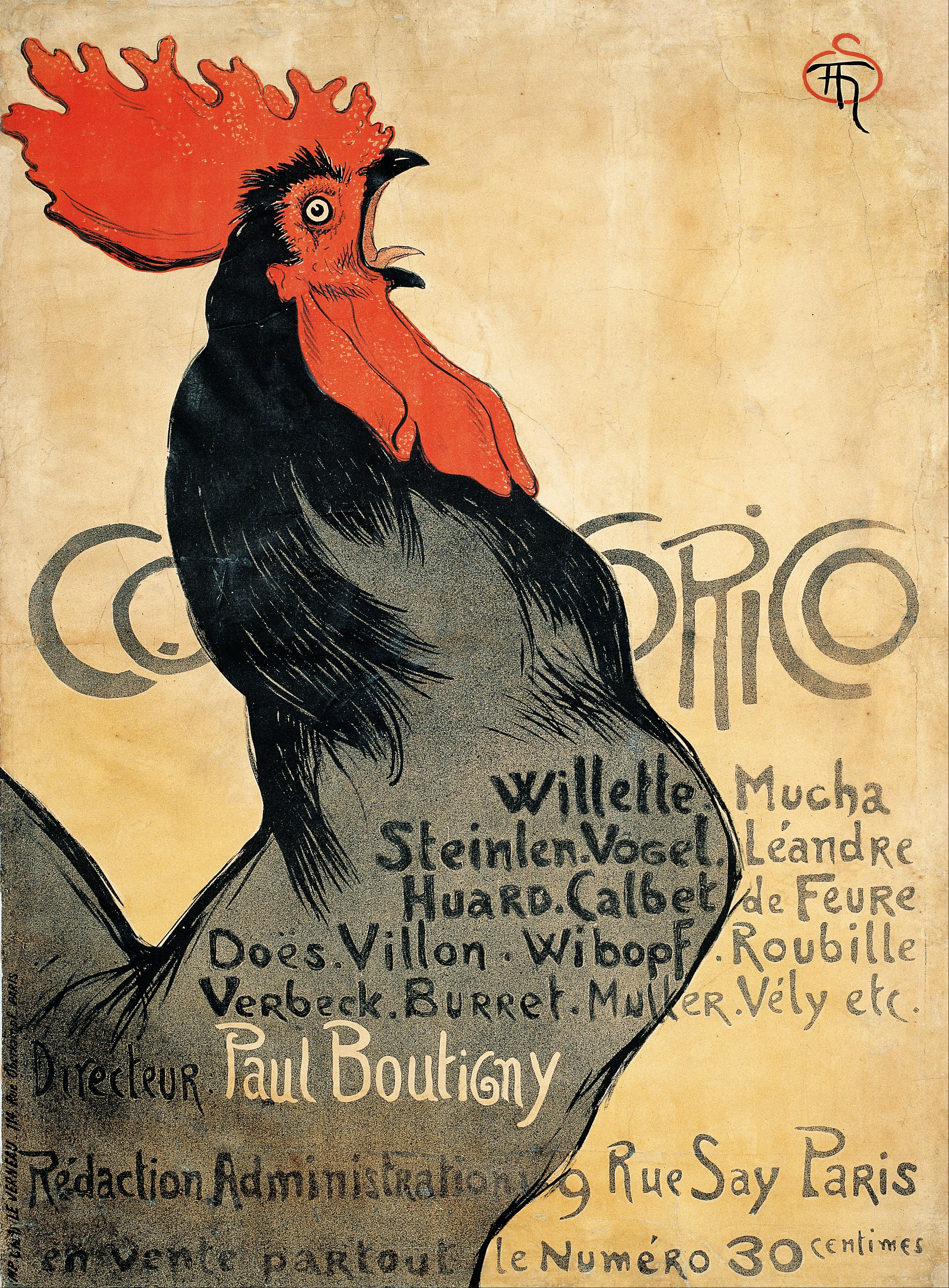
Cocorico (1896)

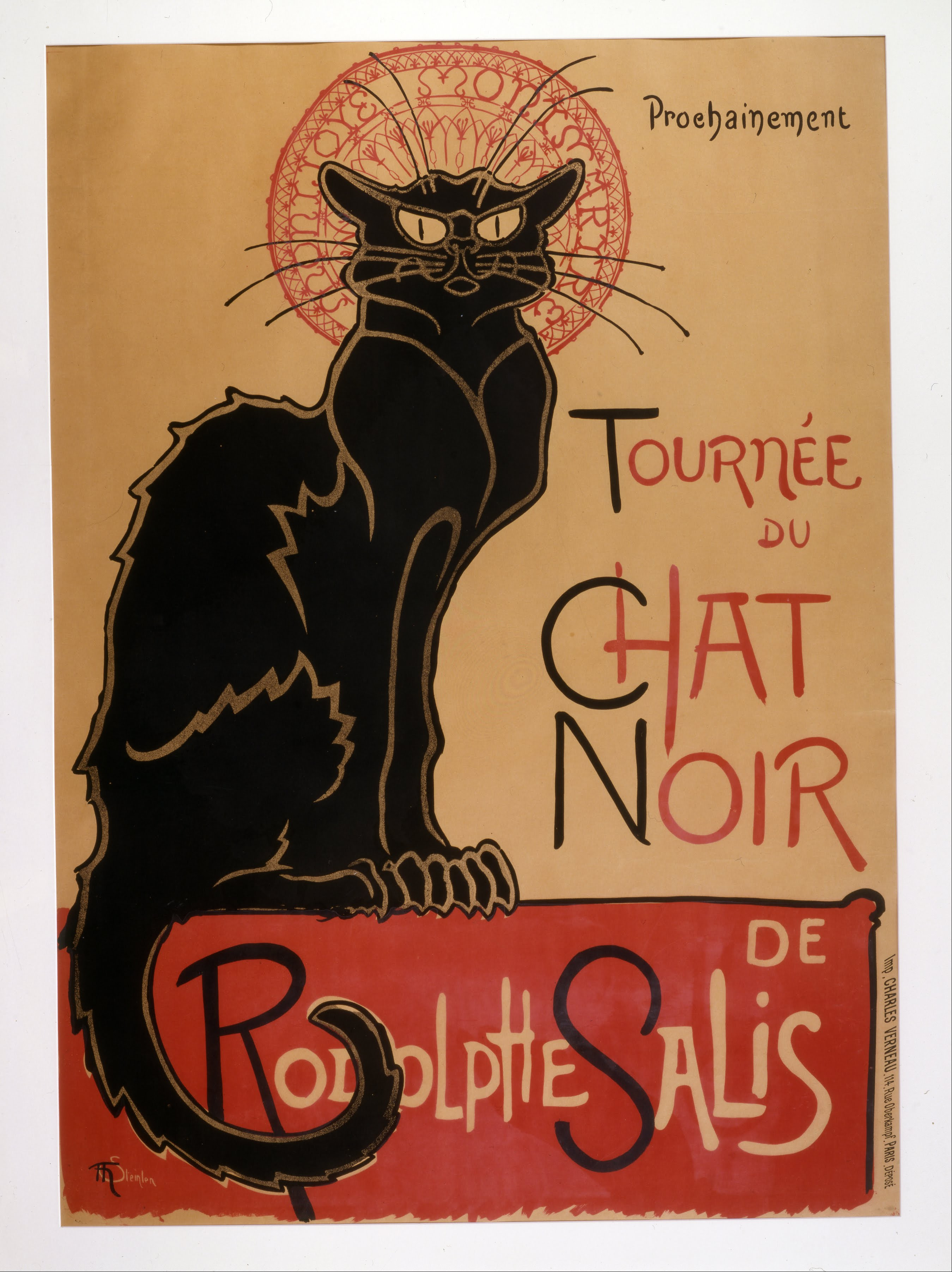
La Tournée du Chat Noir de Rodolphe Salis (1896)

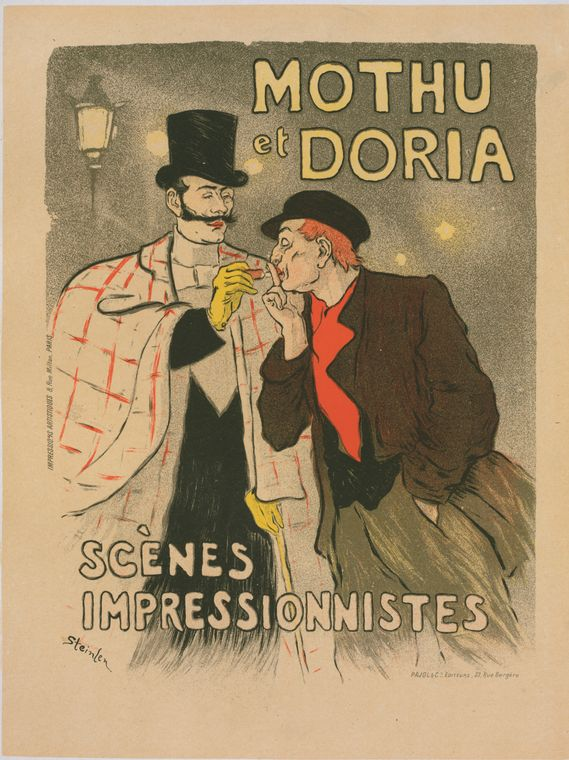
Mothu et Doria (1896-1900)

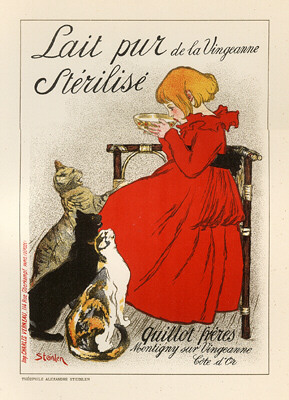
Lait pur stérilisé de la Vingeanne (1897)

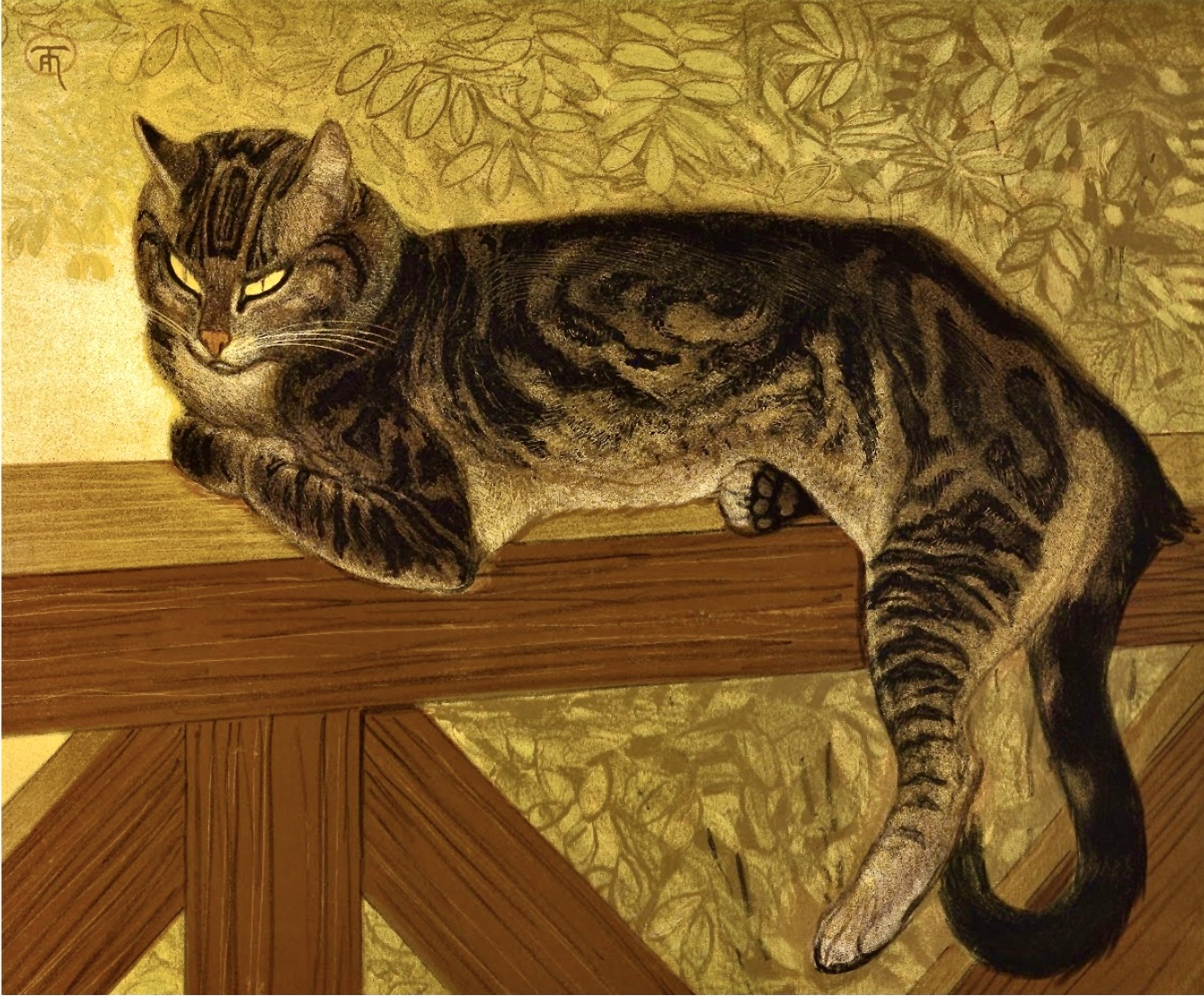
Summer: Cat on a Balustrade (1909), lithograph

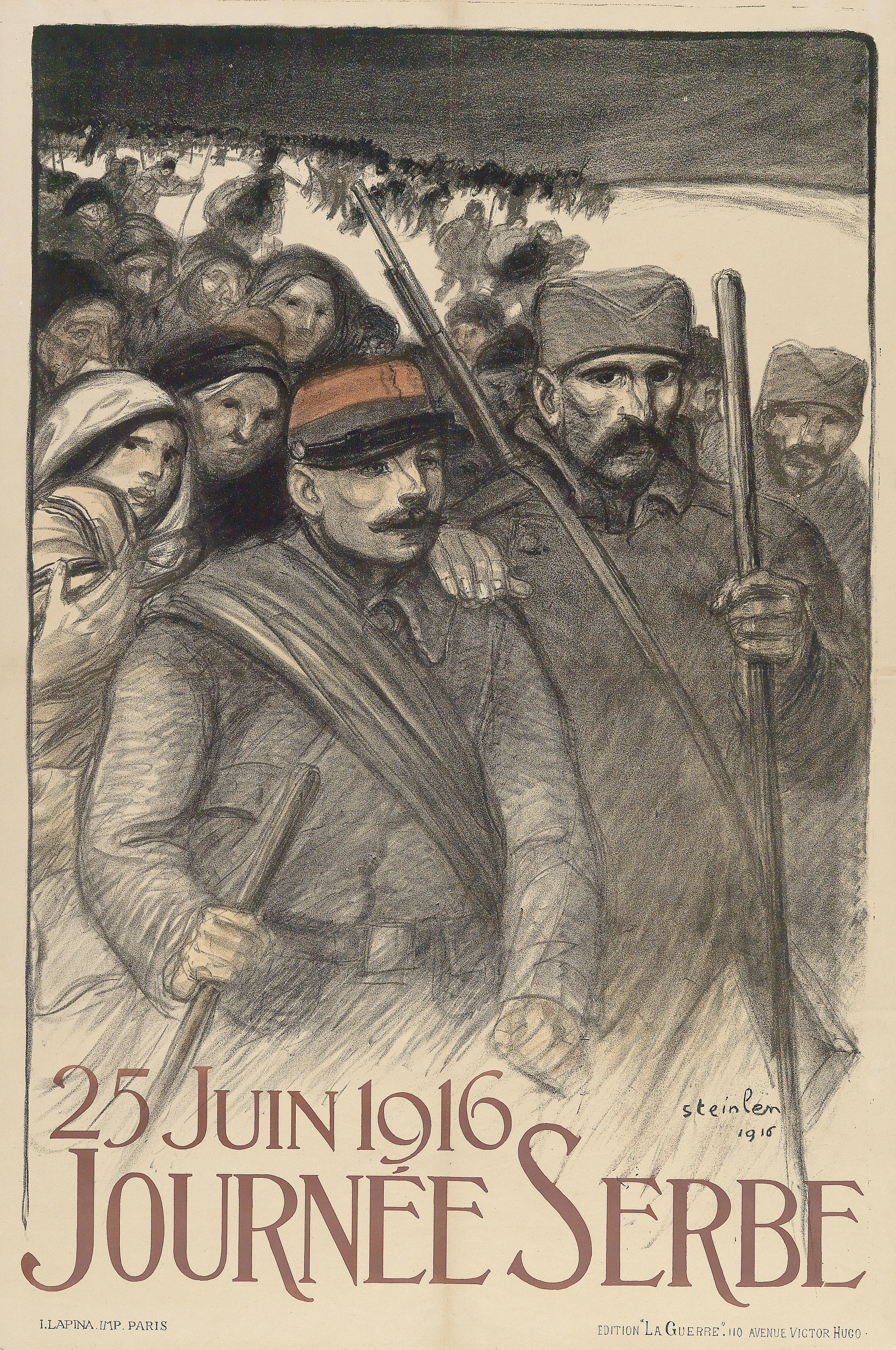
25 Juin 1916 - Journée Serbe (1916)

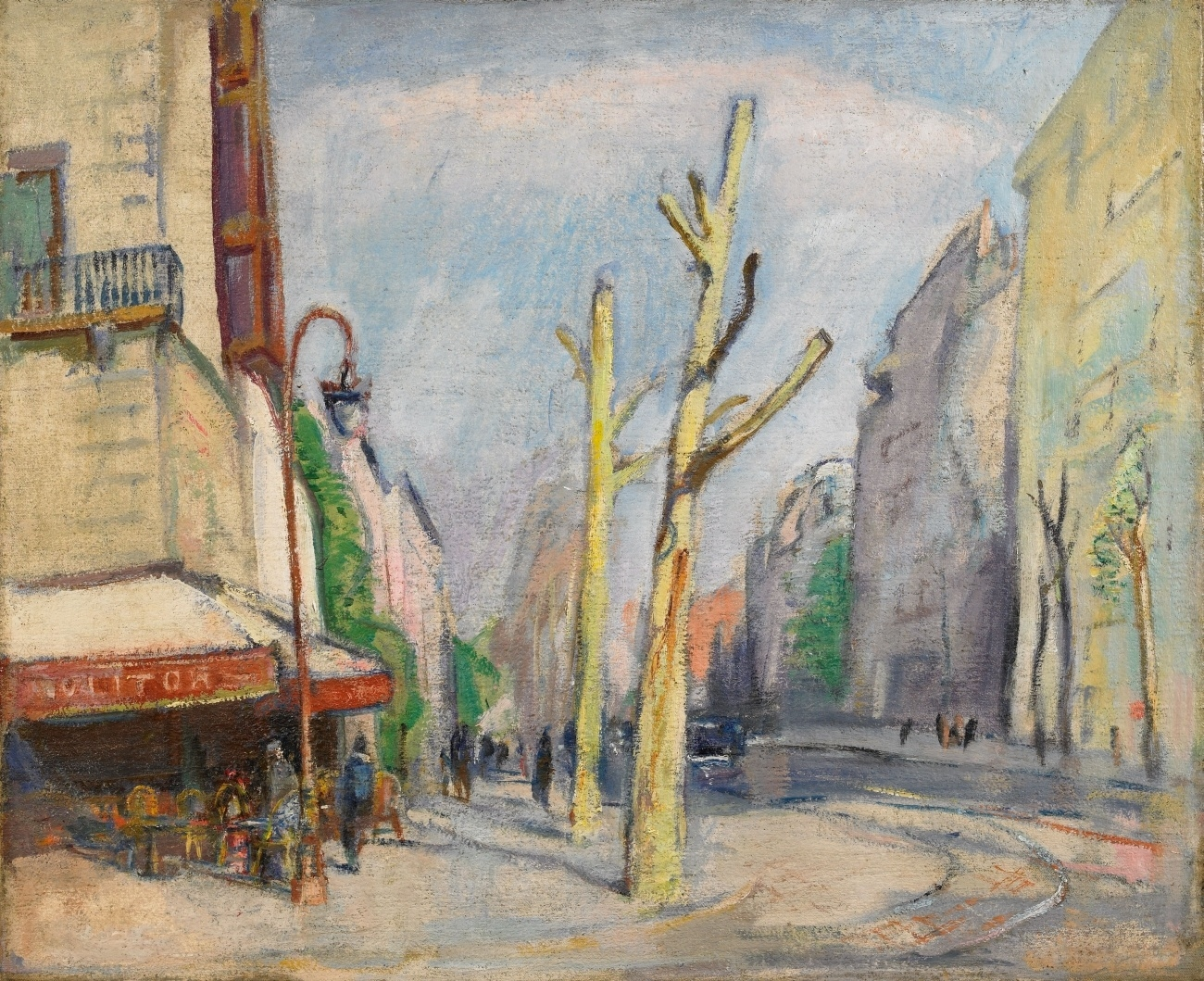
Café à Léon (1921)

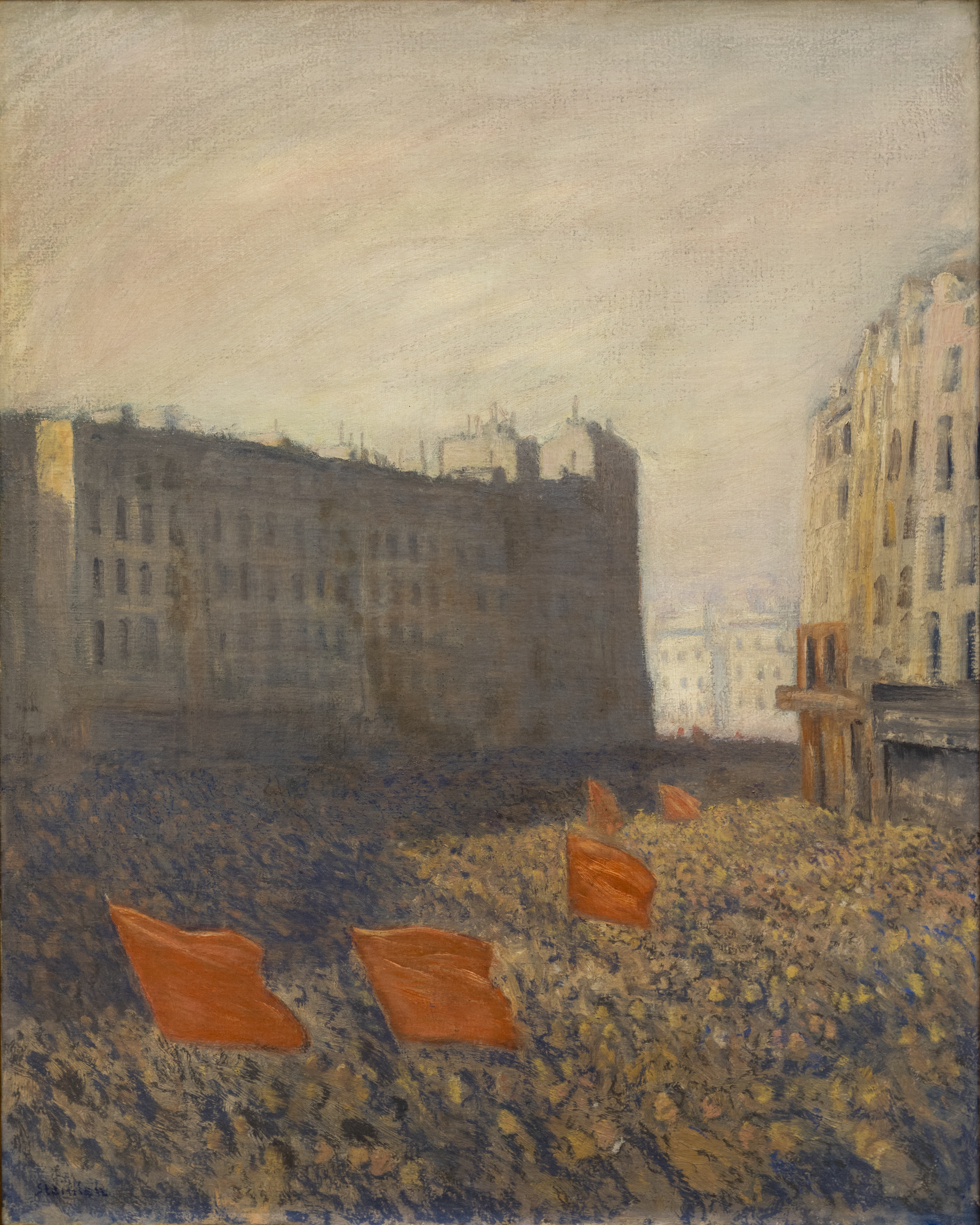
Public demonstration, circa 1903, MUba Eugène Leroy, Tourcoing

Cry of the Oppressed or The Liberator, 1903
