= List of operas and operettas by Charles Lecocq =

This is a complete list of the operas and operettas of the French composer Charles Lecocq (1832–1918).

== Genres ==
Lecocq wrote 21 opéras comiques, 12 opéras bouffes, eight opérettes, two opérettes bouffes, two opérettes de salon, two saynètes, and one each of the following: bluette bouffe, comédie-musicale, féerie, folie parée et masquée, opéra monologue, pantomime, scène, vaudeville and vaudeville-opérette.

== List ==
Title	Genre	Subdivisions	Libretto	Première date	Place, theatre
Le Docteur Miracle	opéra comique	1 act	Léon Battu and Ludovic Halévy	8 April 1857	Paris, Bouffes-Parisiens
Huis-Clos	opérette	1 act	Adolphe Guénée and E. Marquet	29 January 1859	Paris, Folies-Nouvelles
Les Prés Saint-Gervais	opéra comique	3 acts	Victorien Sardou and Philippe Gille	24 April 1862	Paris, Théâtre des Variétés
Le Baiser à la porte	opérette de salon	1 act	Jules de la Guette	26 March 1864	Paris, Folies-Marigny
Liline et Valentin	opérette de salon	1 act	Jules de la Guette	25 May 1864?	Paris, Folies-Marigny
Les Ondines au champagne	opérette	1 act	Hippolyte Lefèbvre, Jules Pélissié (Victorien Sardou) and Merle	3 September 1865 or 1866	Paris, Folies-Marigny
Le Myosotis	opérette bouffe	1 act	A. de Noé and William Busnach	2 or 3 May 1866	Paris, Théâtre du Palais-Royal
Le Cabaret de Ramponneau	opérette	1 act	Jules Le Sire and Amédée Boudin	11 October 1867?	Paris, Folies-Marigny
L'Amour et Son Carquois	opéra bouffe	2 acts	A.J.R. Delbès and E. Marquet	30 January 1868	Paris, Athénée
Fleur-de-Thé	opéra bouffe	3 acts	Henri Chivot and Alfred Duru	11 April 1868	Paris, Athénée
Les Jumeaux de Bergame	opéra comique	1 act	William Busnach	20 November 1868	Paris, Athénée
Le Carnaval d'un merle blanc	folie parée et masquée	3 acts	Henri Chivot and Alfred Duru	10 December 1868	Paris, Théâtre du Palais-Royal
Gandolfo	opérette	1 act	Henri Chivot and Alfred Duru	16 January 1869	Paris, Bouffes-Parisiens
Deux Portières pour un cordon	scène	1 act	Lucian and Hippolyte Lefèbvre	19 March 1869	Paris, Théâtre du Palais-Royal
Le Rajah de Mysore	opérette bouffe	1 act	Henri Chivot and Alfred Duru	21 September 1869	Paris, Bouffes-Parisiens
Le Beau Dunois	opéra bouffe	1 act	Henri Chivot and Alfred Duru	13 April 1870	Paris, Théâtre des Variétés
Le Testament de M. de Crac	opéra bouffe	1 act	Jules Moinaux	23 October 1871	Paris, Bouffes-Parisiens
Le Barbier de Trouville	bluette bouffe	1 act	Adolphe Jaime and Jules Noriac	19 November 1871	Paris, Bouffes-Parisiens
Sauvons la caisse	opérette	1 act	Jules de la Guette	1871	Paris, Tertulia
Les Cent Vierges	opéra bouffe	3 acts	Clairville, Henri Chivot and Alfred Duru	16 or 17 March 1872	Brussels, Théâtre des Fantaisies-Parisiennes
La Fille de Madame Angot	opéra comique	3 acts	Louis-François Clairville, Victor Koning and Paul Siraudin	4 December 1872	Brussels, Théâtre des Fantaisies-Parisiennes
Le Fils de Madame Angot	opérette	1 act	G. Dorfeuil	25 September 1873	Paris, Théâtre de la Gaîté-Montparnasse
La Résurrection de la mère Angot	saynète	1 act	Louis-François Clairville	24 February 1874	Paris, Théâtre des Folies-Dramatiques
Giroflé-Girofla	opéra bouffe	3 acts	Eugène Leterrier and Albert Vanloo	21 March 1874	Brussels, Théâtre des Fantaisies-Parisiennes
Les Prés Saint-Gervais	opéra bouffe	3 acts	Victorien Sardou and Philippe Gille	14 November 1874	Paris, Théâtre des Variétés
Le Pompon	opéra comique	3 acts	Henri Chivot and Alfred Duru	10 November 1875	Paris, Folies-Dramatiques
La Petite Mariée	opéra bouffe	3 acts	Eugène Leterrier and Albert Vanloo	21 December 1875	Paris, Renaissance
Kosiki	opéra comique	3 acts	William Busnach and Armand Liorat	18 October 1876	Paris, Théâtre de la Renaissance
La Marjolaine	opéra bouffe	3 acts	Eugène Leterrier and Albert Vanloo	3 February 1877	Paris, Théâtre de la Renaissance
Le Petit Duc	opéra comique	3 acts	Henri Meilhac and Ludovic Halévy	25 January 1878	Paris, Théâtre de la Renaissance
La Camargo	opéra comique	3 acts	Eugène Leterrier and Albert Vanloo	20 November 1878	Paris, Théâtre de la Renaissance
Le Grand Casimir	opérette	3 acts	Jules Prével and Albert de Saint-Albin	11 January 1879	Paris, Variétés
La Petite Mademoiselle	opéra comique	3 acts	Henri Meilhac and Ludovic Halévy	12 April 1879	Paris, Théâtre de la Renaissance
La Jolie Persane	opéra comique	3 acts	Eugène Leterrier and Albert Vanloo	28 October 1879	Paris, Théâtre de la Renaissance
L'Arbre de Noël (with Georges Jacobi)	'féerie'	30 tableaux	Arnold Mortier, Eugène Leterrier and Albert Vanloo	1880	Paris, Théâtre de la Porte Saint-Martin
Janot	opéra comique	3 acts	Henri Meilhac and Ludovic Halévy	21 January 1881	Paris, Théâtre de la Renaissance
La Roussotte (with Hervé and Marius Boulard)	vaudeville-opérette	3 acts	Albert Millaud, Henri Meilhac and Ludovic Halévy	26 or 28 January 1881	Paris, Variétés
Le Jour et la Nuit	opéra bouffe	3 acts	Eugène Leterrier and Albert Vanloo	5 November 1881	Paris, Théâtre des Nouveautés
Le Cœur et la Main	opéra comique	3 acts	Charles Nuitter and Alexandre Beaume	19 October 1882	Paris, Nouveautés
La Princesse des Canaries	opéra bouffe	3 acts	Henri Chivot and Alfred Duru	9 February 1883	Paris, Folies-Dramatiques
L'Oiseau bleu	opéra comique	3 acts	Henri Chivot and Alfred Duru	16 January 1884	Paris, Nouveautés
La Vie mondaine	opéra bouffe	3 acts	Émile de Najac and Paul Ferrier	13 February 1885	Paris, Nouveautés
Plutus	opéra comique	3 acts	Albert Millaud and Gaston Jollivet	31 March 1886	Paris, Opéra-Comique
Les Grenadiers de Mont-Cornette	opéra bouffe	3 acts	Louis Péricaud, Lucien Delormel and Édouard Philippe	4 January 1887	Paris, Bouffes-Parisiens
Ali-Baba	opéra comique	4 acts	Albert Vanloo and William Busnach	11 November 1887	Brussels, Alhambra
La Volière	opéra comique	3 acts	Charles Nuitter and Alexandre Beaume	11 or 12 February 1888	Paris, Nouveautés
L'Égyptienne	opéra comique	3 acts	Henri Chivot, Charles Nuitter and Alexandre Beaume	8 November 1890	Paris, Folies-Dramatiques
Nos Bons Chasseurs	vaudeville	3 acts	Paul Bilhaud and Michel Carré	10 April 1894	Paris, Nouveau-Théâtre
Ninette	opéra comique	3 acts	Charles Clairville fils, Ch. Hubert, G. Lebeaut and Ch. de Trogoff	28 February 1896	Paris, Bouffes-Parisiens
Ruse d'amour	saynète	1 act	Stéphane Bordèse	26 June 1897	Paris, Bodinière
Barbe-Bleue	pantomime		R. de Saint-Geniès	1898	Paris, Olympia (Paris)
La Belle au bois dormant	opéra comique	3 acts	Georges Duval and Albert Vanloo	19 February 1900	Paris, Bouffes-Parisiens
Yetta	opéra comique	3 acts	Fernand Beissier	7 or 8 March 1903	Brussels, Galeries Saint-Hubert
Rose Mousse	comédie musicale	1 act	André Alexandre and Peter Carin	28 January 1904	Paris, Théâtre des Capucines
La Salutiste	opéra monologue	1 act	Fernand Beissier	14 January 1905	Paris, Théâtre des Capucines
La Trahison de Pan	opéra comique	1 act	Stéphane Bordèse	13 September 1911	Aix-les-Bains, Théâtre du Cercle
Miousic (with Rodolphe Berger, Charles Cuvillier, Jules Erlanger, Reynaldo Hahn, Henri Hirchmann, Louis Lecombe, Xavier Leroux, André Messager, Willy Redstone and Paul Vidal)	opérette	3 acts	Paul Ferrier	22 March 1914	Paris, Olympia
