= La Camargo (opera) =

Opéra comique by Charles Lecocq, Eugène Leterrier and Albert Vanloo

Zulma Bouffar in the title role, 1878

La Camargo is a 3-act opéra comique with music by Charles Lecocq and words by Eugène Leterrier and Albert Vanloo. It is a highly fictionalised story of two historical 18th-century characters, the dancer La Camargo and the bandit Louis Mandrin.

The opera was first produced at the Théâtre de la Renaissance, Paris in 1878, and ran for 98 performances.

== Background ==
Lecocq had written four operas for the Théâtre de la Renaissance between 1875 and 1878. The most successful of these, Le petit duc, had run for 301 performances. La Camargo was commissioned to succeed it. Lecocq had worked with numerous librettists since his first big success, Fleur-de-Thé, ten years earlier. For the new piece his collaborators were the experienced team of Eugène Leterrier and Albert Vanloo, with whom he had worked on the highly successful Giroflé-Girofla (1874), La petite mariée (1875) and the fairly successful La Marjolaine (1877).

The two main characters of Leterrier and Vanloo's libretto, La Camargo and Louis Mandrin, are fictionalised versions of real historical figures. The former was a popular star of the ballet in the reign of Louis XV, and the latter a notorious brigand. They lived at the same time, but there is no evidence that they ever met. La Camargo was played by Zulma Bouffar, a favourite with Parisian audiences, closely associated with the works of Offenbach, and her appearance in an opera by his younger rival was something of a coup for the Théâtre de la Renaissance; Lecocq dedicated the published score to her. La Camargo opened on 20 November 1878 and ran for 98 performances.

== Original cast ==
Vauthier as Mandrin

- Mandrin – Eugène Vauthier
- Pontcalé – Jean-François Berthelier
- Saturnin – M. Lary
- Péruchot – M. Pacra
- Tournevis – M. Libert
- Le Philosophe – M. Deberg
- Rossignol – M. Duchosal
- Taquet – M. Tony
- Camargo – Zulma Bouffar
- Dona Juana de Rio Negro – Marie Desclauzas
- Colombe – Mily-Meyer

Source: Vocal score.

== Synopsis ==
=== Act 1 ===
The green room of the Paris Opéra

Costume design for Dona Juana

Costume design for Pontcalé

Mily-Meyer as Colombe

The ballet company is assembled under the direction of the manager, Taquet, ready to go on stage in La Camargo's farewell performance before she leaves Paris for Lyons, where she is to fill an engagement. Her friends are joined by the robber Mandrin, who is elegantly costumed and passing himself off as a grandee, the Chevalier de Valjoly. Also present is La Camargo's admirer, the Marquis de Pontcalé, who has just made her a present of a magnificent necklace. Mandrin has come expecting to offer a similarly grand gift, but, to his annoyance, his men, whom he had told to steal something suitable, have not appeared.

Pontcalé, who prides himself on his detective ability, explains to everyone that he has been asked by the police authorities to help them track down and capture the notorious Mandrin, who is believed to be in Paris. The robber's identity has been established by a recent deed of criminal daring: the robbery of a château near St. Germain, occupied by a Spanish aristocrat, Juana de Rio Negro. She now enters, having been sent by the police to find Pontcalé and give him details of the robbery. She tells him, and all present, the details of the burglary but admits that she cannot distinguish between her dreams and the real events of that night – did the dashing intruder make love to her or not?

Once the green room is empty, Mandrin's men break in through a window, steal the necklace (Pontcalé's gift) from Camargo's dressing room, and meeting their chief, give it to him and depart. He does not realise that it has just been stolen from the dancer's room and he congratulates himself on finally having a magnificent present for her. Juana returns and, seeing the robber, recognises him as the man who stood at her bedside when she awoke from her puzzling dreams on the night of the robbery. She demands an explanation and he, by wily professions of love and hints that she alone may reform him, induces her to conceal his identity.

Among the audience for the ballet is a young provincial, Saturnin. He has become infatuated with La Camargo, and attempts to make his way on the stage after the performance, to make the acquaintance of the great dancer. He reaches the green room, and in a farcical scene is pursued by his uncle, Péruchot, and his fiancée, Colombe, who find him hiding among the ladies of the ballet, and drag him away. Camargo, going to her room to dress, discovers the loss of the necklace. Pontcalé, furious that a robbery has been committed under his supposedly keen eye, orders that the doors be locked and a search instituted immediately. Mandrin, with the necklace in his possession, is in great danger, but Juana, in pity, takes it from him and conceals it in her bosom. The search results in nothing but the discovery of the broken window pane, and the conclusion that the robbery is the work of the terrible but unrecognised Mandrin, on whom war is declared by all present in a lively concerted piece and chorus.

=== Act 2 ===
Mandrin's castle

Mandrin has been followed to his stronghold by the infatuated Juana. Also in the building are Saturnin, Péruchot and Colombe, who were taken hostage on their road home from Paris. At Mandrin's orders the carriage in which La Camargo is journeying to Lyons is waylaid, and she is brought to the castle. Believing Mandrin to be the Chevalier de Valjoly, she imagines her capture is a joke on his part: a novel way of inviting her to a fête to be given in her honour in the château.

Pontcalé, who is on Mandrin's track, gains access to the castle by a secret passage. He has come with two hundred soldiers to arrest the bandit, but once inside the passage he finds the door has closed behind him, leaving him on his own. He encounters Mandrin, whom he still believes to be Valjoly. Mandrin persuades him to halt his men until after the fête, and sends one of his brigands with Pontcalé's order to that effect to the commanding officer. Saturnin follows him, and steals the order. The troops therefore arrive in the height of the festivities, and Pontcalé asks that they may be lodged in the castle. Mandrin agrees and artfully has them put under lock and key by his men.

Saturnin convinces La Camargo and Pontcalé that Valjoly is Mandrin. Saturnin escapes through the secret passage to summon reinforcements. Camargo and Pontcalé tell Mandrin that they know he is the robber chief, and Juana, who is jealous of his infatuation for Camargo, also denounces him. He summons his men, and all three accusers are seized.

=== Act 3 ===
The cabaret de Ramponneau, Paris

The principal members of the robber band are drinking and lounging among the crowds in the popular cabaret bar, awaiting their chief. Also present are La Camargo, Juana and Pontcalé, freed from the bandit's castle by the gendarmerie. Pontcalé continues his pursuit of Mandrin. He announces that he has found a brilliant new detective whom he has employed to hunt down the robber. This detective, Monsieur Philidor, is Mandrin himself in disguise. In this character he overhears Camargo's order to the bearers of her sedan chair to call at eight o'clock, to take her to a ball. Supposing himself alone he summons his men and tells them to bribe the bearers to let them take their places, and then carry off La Camargo after the ball to a place designated by him. This is overhead by Colombe who has concealed herself behind Ramponneau's counter. She tells La Camargo about the plot.

Camargo sends Pontcalé a note detailing the plot, and arranges with Colombe that the latter will take her place in the sedan chair at the appointed hour. Then, disguised as an organ grinder calling herself Javotte, and in the company of Juana, who is dressed as a street vendor, Camargo makes Mandrin betray himself to her. He turns to escape, but finds the house surrounded by Pontcalé's troops. La Camargo takes pity on Mandrin, and does not reveal to Pontcalé that his pet detective is the bandit chief. She lets Mandrin escape, telling him to leave Paris at once and find somewhere else to get himself hanged.

Source: 1879 vocal score.

== Numbers ==
Lary and Mily-Meyer as Saturnin and Colombe

- Act 1
  - Overture
  - Choeur et ensemble – "Que les ris et les jeux" (Joy and laughter!)
  - Entrée des abonnés – "A nos petites chattes " (To our little kittens)
  - Couplets – "Mes aïeux, j'en ai la mémoire " (My ancestors are remembered)
  - Choeur – "Ran, plan, voici notre reine" (Ran, plan [drumbeat sound], here is our queen)
  - Couplets de la Camargo – "Partout on me fête, on m'acclame" (Everywhere I'm feted, I'm acclaimed)
  - Couplets de l'oeil – "Savez-vous, auprès des femmes" (Do you know, with women)
  - Madrigal – "Je comprendrais fort peu, vraiment" (I really hardly understand)
  - Le rêve de Dora Juana – "Je dormais, tout dans la nature" (I slept, like everything in nature)
  - Rondo de la Camargo – "Si vous saviez, mes chers amis " (If you knew, my dear friends)
  - Romance – "Je vous ai dit mon ignorance " (I told you my ignorance)
  - Ensemble des voleurs – "L'Ecureuil me voilà!" (Squirrel, here I am!)
  - Finale
    - Ensemble – "O ciel! qu'arrive-t-il" (O Heaven, what's happening)
    - Scène – "Nous sommes innocents" (We are innocent)
    - Ensemble – "C'en est trop à la lin" (It's too much of a thing)
- Act 2
  - Choeur des voleurs – "Ah! qu'il est doux pour des voleurs" (Ah, how sweet it is for thieves)
  - Ronde de la bande a Mandrin – "Ils sorti trente ou quarante" (The band is thirty or forty strong)
  - Air de Mandrin – "Ah! soyez distingués" (Ah, let us be grand)
  - Choeur des prisonniers – "Les yeux tout de larmes noyés " (Eyes overflowing with tears)
  - Couplets de Colombe – "Presque toujours une cousine " (Almost always with cousins)
  - Couplets – "Laissez-moi, monsieur Ie voleur" (Leave me, Monsieur robber)
  - Petit choeur – "Nous voici, pommadés" (Here we are, spruced up)
  - Ballet-pastorale – "Pour savoir comment se fait un ballet" (The way to make a ballet)
  - Entrée de la bergère – "Voici d'abord une bergère" (First, here is a shepherdess)
  - Duo – "Ce serait une vie heureuse" (It would be a happy life)
  - Couplets – "Certes, lorsque l'on n'aime pas" (Without love, certainly)
  - Finale:
    - Chœur – "Ah! la bonne fortune" (Ah, good fortune)
    - Scène – "Entendez-vous ces coups de feu" (Do you hear these shots)
    - Ensemble – "Les soldats! les soldats!" (Soldiers! Soldiers!)
    - Entrée des soldats – "Mes amis! qu'on ouvre la porte" (My friends, open the door)
    - Larghetto – "Voyez ce regard fatidique" (See his prophetic eye)
    - Strette – "D'étape en étape, il faut l'emmener" (Step by step, take him away)
- Act 3
  - Choeur – "Chez Ramponneau le monde accourt" (To Ramponneau the world comes running)
  - Chant de la vielleuse – "Et zon, zen, zon, saute Suzon" (And zon, zen, zon – Skip, Suzon)
  - Cris des marchands – "Pour la vielleuse et sa marmotte" (For the old woman and her marmot)
  - Sortie – "Mesdames et messieurs, merci" (Ladies and gentlemen, thank you)
  - Couplets de Louis le Bien-aimé – "Le Roi s'est dit" (The King said to himself)
  - Duetto de la police – "La police, la justice" (Police, justice)
  - Duetto – "Étais-tu bête I – Etais-je bétel" (I was stupid!)
  - Quintette – "A la tienne, Etienne!" (Here's to yours, Etienne!)
  - Duetto – "Trotte, trotte, petite Javotte" (Trot, trot, little Javotte)
  - Chanson de la marmotte en vie – "En quittant ma montagne" (When I left my mountain)
  - Couplet final – "J'dois quéqu'chose à Javotte (I owe something to Javotte)

== Revivals ==
La Camargo was given in French in New York at Booth's Theatre in December 1879 by Maurice Grau's opera company. It played in repertory during a season that ended in May 1880. The piece was presented in the French provinces, and was seen in Budapest in 1878 and Vienna in 1879.

== Critical reception ==
Les Annales du théâtre et de la musique considered the piece a mediocre opera beautifully staged, the music "a deluge of couplets". The Era found the libretto not very interesting but full of animation and, on the whole, amusing. The same critic rated Lecocq's music as less elegant than that of Le petit duc, but lively and melodious throughout. He predicted, wrongly, a long run for the opera. The Athenaeum thought a libretto about "the Dick Turpin of France" unlikely to appeal to the Parisian public but speculated that the piece might be saved by Lecocq's score, worthy of the best of his earlier successes. When the work was given in Boulogne a local critic found it "a great deal too long and not exceedingly original". The New York Times thought the music "pretty and easy, too easy in fact, showing that the composer has been careless in revision and has simply jotted down his inspirations as they came to him". Nonetheless, the critic judged the work at least as good as anything on offer at the prestigious Opéra-Comique.

== References and sources ==
=== Sources ===
- Lecocq, Charles (1878). La Camargo vocal score. Brandus: Paris. OCLC 1047507284.
- Lecocq, Charles (1879). La Camargo. New York: Metropolitan Printing. OCLC 903647535.
- Noël, Édouard; Edmond Stoullig (1879). Les annales du théatre et de la musique, 1878. Paris: Charpentier. OCLC 1024149992.
- Noël, Édouard; Edmond Stoullig (1880). Les annales du théatre et de la musique, 1879. Paris: Charpentier. OCLC 1024149992.
