= La Marjolaine =

Opéra bouffe by Charles Lecocq

Poster for 1877 production, Paris

La Marjolaine is an opéra bouffe in three acts, with music by Charles Lecocq and words by Eugène Leterrier and Albert Vanloo, the third collaboration by the three. It opened at the Théâtre de la Renaissance, Paris on 3 February 1877 and had a fairly successful run of 117 performances. The work was staged in continental Europe, Britain and the Americas over the next few years.

The piece is set in 16th century Flanders; it depicts a deceitful, and ultimately unsuccessful, attempt to damage a virtuous woman's reputation. The central role was taken in the original production by Jeanne Granier, who created the leading parts in several Lecocq operas of the 1870s.

== Background and original performances ==
Having moved back to Paris after being based in Brussels in the first half of the 1870s, Lecocq became associated with the Théâtre de la Renaissance, which was run by Victor Koning, co-librettist of his biggest hit, La fille de Madame Angot. La Marjolaine was Lecocq's third piece for the Renaissance. He was a prolific composer, and among his substantial output his successes such as La fille de Madame Angot and Giroflé-Girofla were interspersed with works that failed to attract the public. A generally sympathetic profile of him in the musical press suggested that he was "making himself rather too cheap, and writing too much to be invariably fortunate". Having had a success with La petite mariée which ran for 212 performances at the Renaissance in 1875–1876, he followed it with Kosiki, a mock-oriental piece that lasted for 75 performances in 1876.

Kosiki is a less comic opera than most Lecocq works, and for his next attempt the composer set a racier story. Eugène Leterrier and Albert Vanloo, in their third collaboration with Lecocq, wrote a libretto that has comic echoes of the plot of Shakespeare's drama Cymbeline, with a faithful wife falling victim to a plot that falsely impugns her honour. Koning and Lecocq delayed the production until their star soprano, Jeanne Granier, returned to Paris from St Petersburg, where she had been playing a season. The opera opened on 3 February 1877 and was a box-office success, although it did not break records as La fille de Madame Angot had done. It ran for 117 performances until the Renaissance closed for the summer, as was then the usual practice in Paris. It was generally expected that La Marjolaine would re-open the theatre in September, but instead Kosiki was given another staging, bringing its total performances to more than a hundred.

== Original cast ==
Vauthier as Annibal

- Palamède, Baron Van der Boom – Jean-François Berthelier
- Annibal de l'Estrapade – Eugène Vauthier
- Frickel – Félix Puget
- Péterschop – M. Caliste
- The Mayor – M. Hervier
- D'Escoublac – M. Gaussins
- Schaerbeck – M. Valotte
- Town crier – M. Cailloux
- Alderman – M. Robillot
- Alderman – M. Gisors
- Marjolaine – Jeanne Granier
- Aveline – Mlle. Théol
- Petrus – Mlle. Carli
- Karl – Mlle. Ribe
- Christian – Mlle. Bied
- Robert – Mlle. Dareine
- Christophe – Mlle. Dianie
- Franz – Mlle. Andrée
- Young girl – Mlle. Néline
- Gudule – Mlle. Davenay
- Charlotte – Mlle. Dhancourt

== Synopsis ==
The opera is set in Flanders in the 16th century.

1877 illustration of Act 1

Act 1
The Place de la Hôtel-de-Ville, Brussels

Marjolaine, a simple country girl, once loved and was loved by Frickel, a handsome young clockmaker, but tiring of his three-year absence mending the old clock in Bruges she accepted a proposal of marriage from Palamède, Baron Van der Boom, a rich and elderly bachelor. The Baron was once the head of a disreputable group dedicated to seducing other men's wives, but is now, it is obliquely suggested, past seducing anybody, even his own wife. The new Baroness also has an unusual history: before marrying, she won the city's official award for virtue eight times, and has come to see if she can win it again. With her husband's support she does so and is once again awarded the gold medal for virtue.

Frickel has returned from Bruges and is distressed to find Marjolaine married. The group of predatory bachelors arrive. The married men of the city are horrified; their wives express mixed feelings. Annibal, the Baron's successor as head of the group, is outraged to find his former leader respectably married, but promises not to try to seduce the new Baroness. The Baron is not worried, and dares him to try. He bets Annibal that Marjolaine will box the ears of anyone attempting to impugn her honour.

Act 2
The Baron's castle
Confident in his wife's virtue, the Baron has invited the league of bachelors to be his guests at the castle. Alone with Marjolaine, Annibal thinks his attempts at seduction are working until she gives him a severe box on the ears. Despite this setback he intends to persist, and bribes a servant to smuggle him into Marjolaine's bedroom in a large chest. From this hiding place he watches her undress, and is much affected by her beauty. Frickel comes to warn Marjolaine of the bachelors' plot against her, and Annibal seizes his opportunity. He pushes Frickel into a cupboard, locks it, and rouses the house. Marjolaine is hopelessly compromised, discovered with a man in her room. The Baron admits that he has lost the bet and hands over the castle and his possessions to Annibal.

Act 3
A villa at Boitsfort, near Brussels
The Baron, reduced to poverty by his lost bet, is living alone, with only a dead fowl called George to keep him company. Frickel and Marjolaine are wandering the country selling clocks. The Baron obtains a divorce, discovering just too late that he has been deceived by Annibal. He tries to stop the divorce, but cannot. Annibal hopes that Marjolaine will choose him. To his and the Baron's chagrin she rejects them both, chooses Frickel, and declares that at last she has obtained the real prize of virtue.

== Numbers ==
Act 1

- Overture
- Chorus – Bourgeoises et bourgeois (Townswomen and townsmen)
- Entrance of the Mayor (Town Crier, Major) – Mes amis, je vous remercie (My friends, thank you)
- Chorus of girls – Baissant les yeux modestement (Eyes lowered modestly)
- Couplets (Mayor) – Jeunes filles, selon l'usage (Girls, according to custom)
- Couplets (Aveline) – Vois-tu, j'ai le coeur trop sensible (You see, my heart is too sensitive)
- Rondeau (Marjolaine)– Pendant que vous dormiez encore (While you were still asleep)
- Couplets (Baron) – Dix est un chiffre rond (Ten is a round number)
- Air (Aveline, Frickel, Peterschop) – Ahl comme il était détraqué! (Ah! Out of order!)
- Duet (Marjolaine, Frickel) – Je ne suis plus la Marjolaine (I am no longer Marjolaine)
- Ensemble (Aveline, Peterschop and chorus) – Ils sont ici! (They are here)
- Chorus of husbands – Nous sommes consternés (We are dismayed)
- War chant (Boys, D'Escoublac, Schaerbeck, Annibal) – Il est précis, il est concis (It is accurate; it is concise)
- Presentation (all) – Permets qu'ici je te présente (Allow me to introduce you)
- Ensemble (all) – L'aventure est surprenante (The adventure is surprising)
- Chorus – Accourons tous, dépêchons-nous (Let us hurry)
- Finale (chorus) – Elle a la médaille (She has the medal)

Act 2

- Entr'acte
- Chorus (behind the curtain) – Ah! compère, le gai festin I (Ah, partner, the gay treat!)
- Duet (Aveline, Frickel) – Allons! venez çà, la fillette! (Hurry! Come here young lady!)
- Song (Maguelonne) – Magu'lonne allant à la fontaine (Magu'lonne going to the fountain)
- Duet (Marjolaine, Annibal) – Monsieur, monsieur, je vous en prie! (Monsieur, please!)
- Ensemble (Marjolaine, Chorus) – Voici l'heure du couvre-feu (Curfew time)
- Trio (Marjolaine, Aveline, Annibal) – Je sens se fermer ma paupière (I feel my eyelids closing)
- Couplets (Marjolaine, Frickel) – Un mari semblable mérite (A husband deserves the same)
- Couplets (Annibal) – A l'heure où s'unissent tremblants (At a time when trembling unite)
- Finale
  - Chorus – Ciel! quel spectacle imprévu (Heavens! what an unforeseen spectacle!)
  - Scene and couplets (Marjolaine, Frickel, Baron, Annibal, Chorus) – Monsieur, comment êtes-vous chez ma femme – Ah! vraiment! mon pauvre mari (Sir, how are you in my wife's room? – Ah! Really! My poor husband!)

Costume design for Marjolaine, Act 3

Act 3

- Entr'acte
- Chorus – Le nouveau propriétaire (The new owner)
- Chorus of youngsters – Ohé! ohé! les camarades! (Hey, classmates!)
- Couplets (Annibal)– Avril ramène les beaux jours (April brings back the beautiful days)
- Ensemble and couplets (Baron, Boys, Schaerbeck, D'Escoublac, Peterschof, Annibal) – C'est mon livret (This is my booklet)
- Couplets (Aveline) – Il me grondait, il me brusquait (He scolded me, he hustled me)
- Couplets (Marjolaine, Frickel) – Coucous! coucous! (Cuckoo!)
- Complaint (Marjolaine) – Ah! plaignez la misère (Ah! complain about misery)
- Duet (Marjolaine, Annibal) – Et pourtant, quel rêve enchanteur (And yet, what an enchanting dream)
- Finale (Marjolaine, Chorus) – Avant de nous mettre en ménage (Before we join the household)

== Later productions ==
The first production outside France was in March 1877 at the Théâtre des Fantaisies-Parisiennes in Brussels, where Lecocq had been based before moving back to Paris. Eugène Humbert, the director of the Fantaisies-Parisiennes, planned to take his company to play the piece in London, as he had with earlier Lecocq operas, but the plan fell through. The British premiere was in October 1877 at the Royalty Theatre, London, with Kate Santley as Marjolaine and Lionel Brough as the Baron. The first American production was presented at the Broadway Theatre, New York, in the same month by Marie Aimée's company. The piece was staged in Vienna in 1880 and Montevideo in 1881.

== Critical reception ==
In Les Annales du Théâtre et de la Musique, Édouard Noël and Edmond Stoullig thought the music of the first act the best of the score, and the other two acts, despite some fine numbers, rather padded with predictable material. The music critic of the Revue et Gazette musicale de Paris wrote:

Never has M. Ch. Lecocq given the public a work more carefully structured, more felicitous in melody, than La Marjolaine. Operetta's buffoonery has given way to a refined, delicate musical style which is agreeable both to the public and to musicians. This little muse of opera buffa, svelte and clear, laughing with silvery directness but without crudity, boldly continues its way towards opera-comique, and it is M. Lecocq who leads her by the hand.

The Paris correspondent of The Era wrote that Lecocq's style moved more and more to that of true opéra comique; he found the libretto very funny but "spicy, not to say smutty, in the extreme". His London confrère, reviewing the British premiere, found the piece less risqué, but thought Lecocq's score curiously unequal, the first act much superior to the other two. The New York Times thought the score much livelier than that of La petite mariée, and the story and characters more original. The Pall Mall Gazette took a different view of the originality of the plot, finding echoes not only of Cymbeline, but of Fra Diavolo, Linda di Chamounix, and Le Réveillon, the play on which Die Fledermaus was based.

== References and sources ==
=== Sources ===
- Ellis, Katharine (2007). Music Criticism in Nineteenth-century France: La Revue et Gazette musicale de Paris, 1834-80. Cambridge University Press. ISBN 978-0-521-03589-7.
- Noël, Edouard; Edmond Stoullig (1877). Les annales du théâtre et de la musique. Deuxième année: 1876 (in French). Paris: G. Charpentier. OCLC 491464809.
- Noël, Edouard; Edmond Stoullig (1878). Les annales du théâtre et de la musique. Troisième année: 1877 (in French). Paris: G. Charpentier. OCLC 81973146.
- Salgado, Susana (2003). The Teatro Solís : 150 years of opera, concert, and ballet in Montevideo. Middletown, Conn: Wesleyan University Press. ISBN 978-0-8195-6593-8.
- Traubner, Richard (2016). Operetta: A Theatrical History. London: Routledge. ISBN 978-1-138-13892-6.
