= Eugène Vauthier =

French baritone (1843–1910)

As Mandrin in La Camargo, 1878

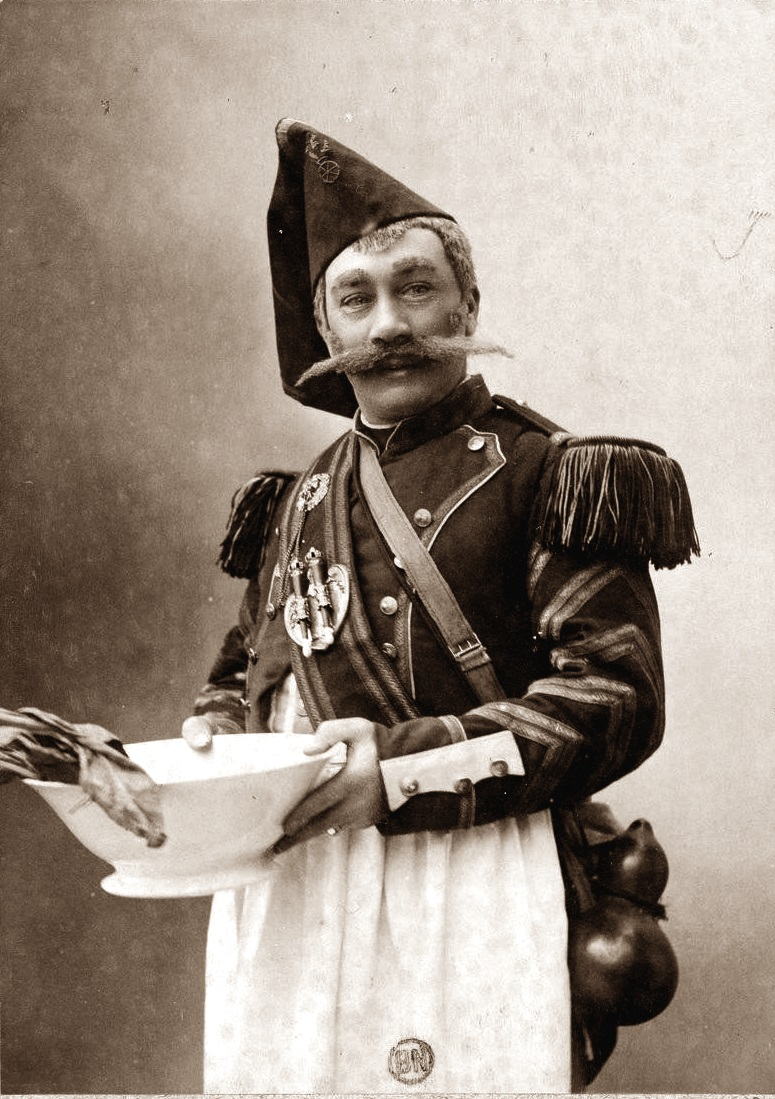
As Monthabor in La fille du tambour-major, 1879

Eugène Vauthier (29 September 1843 – 11 November 1910) was a French baritone whose career was in comic operas by Offenbach, Lecocq, Hervé and other composers of the genre. From 1869 until his retirement in 1905, he was a member of successive Parisian theatre companies, and also made occasional appearances in London.

== Life and career ==
Vauthier was born in Auxerre in 1843. From childhood he was passionate about the theatre, and after learning his craft in the French provinces he made his Paris début in 1869 in an opéra-bouffe, Le Canard à trois becs – the duck with three beaks – at the Théâtre des Folies-Dramatiques. His acting and singing were received with enthusiasm.

After the Franco-Prussian War of 1870–71, Vauthier joined the companies of the Athénée-Lyrique and later the Théâtre de la Renaissance. At the Athénée he made an impression in Monsieur Polichinelle by Alfred Deléhelle and La Guzla de l'émir, by Théodore Dubois. After a year away from France, performing in Cairo, he established himself as a star at the Renaissance with his portrayal of Mourzouk in Charles Lecocq's Giroflé-Girofla in 1874. From then on, in the words of Le Figaro, "for more than twenty years, in full possession of the favour of the public, he created or re-created roles in the principal operettas, each new interpretation adding to his reputation". In the view of Le Ménestrel, "as an actor he had drive, verve, and a big and very outgoing gaiety". His most successful appearances, singled out by Le Figaro, included:

- La petite mariée (1876)
- Le petit duc (1878)
- La Camargo (1878)
- Madame Favart (1878)
- La fille du tambour-major (1879)
- Le cœur et la main (1882)
- Le droit d'aînesse 1883)
- Orphée aux enfers (1887 revival)
- La fille de Madame Angot (1888 revival)
- Le jour et la nuit (1897 revival).

In the 1870s and later Vauthier was seen by audiences in London as well as in Paris. In 1872, he played the Marquis in Hervé's L'œil crevé in the West End; and in 1881 he was in Giroflé-Girofla. In 1890, he guest-starred with the Carl Rosa Opera Company for a five-week London season.

Vauthier played the role of the Mufti in Molière's Le Bourgeois gentilhomme at the Comédie-Française, in which, according to Le Figaro "he was exquisite". His last operatic creation was Squire Alcofribas in Claude Terrasse's opéra bouffe Sire de Vergy, at the Théâtre des Variétés in 1903. In 1905, Fernand Samuel, director of the Variétés, organised a benefit performance for Vauthier, who then retired from the stage and settled in Cassis in the Riviera.

Vauthier died in Cassis on 11 November 1910, aged 67.
