= Albert Vanloo =

Belgian librettist and playwright

Vanloo by Nadar

Albert Vanloo (French: [albɛʁ vɑ̃lo]; Brussels, 10 September 1846 – 1920, Paris) was a Belgian librettist and playwright.

Vanloo lived in Paris as a child and was attracted to the theatre. As a young student he began writing plays and opéra comique libretti, notably with Eugène Leterrier who remained his main collaborator until the latter's death in 1884. He also worked with the writers William Busnach, Henri Chivot and Georges Duval.

== Libretti ==
For Alexandre Charles Lecocq

- Giroflé-Girofla (1874) (with Eugène Leterrier)
- La petite mariée (1875) (with Leterrier)
- La Marjolaine (1877) (with Leterrier)
- La Camargo (1879) (with Leterrier)
- La jolie persane (1879) (with Leterrier)
- L'arbre de Noël (1880) (with Leterrier and Arnold Mortier)
- Le jour et la nuit (1881) (with Leterrier)
- Ali-Baba (1887) (with William Busnach)
- La belle au bois dormant (1900) (with Georges Duval)

For Jacques Offenbach

- Le voyage dans la lune (1875) (with Leterrier and Mortier)
- Mam'zelle Moucheron (1881) (with Leterrier)

For Emmanuel Chabrier

- L'étoile (1877) (with Leterrier)
- Une éducation manquée (1879) (with Leterrier)

For Paul Lacôme

- Le beau Nicolas (1880) (with Leterrier)
- La gardeuse d’oies (1888) (with Leterrier)

For André Messager

- La Béarnaise (1885) (with Leterrier)
- Les p'tites Michu (1897) (with Duval)
- Véronique (1898) (with Duval)
- Les dragons de l'impératrice (1905) (with Duval)

For Antoine Banès

- Le Bonhomme de neige (1894) (with Henri Chivot)
- La Sœur de Jocrisse (1902)

For other composers

- Le petit poucet (1868) (for Laurent de Rillé, with Leterrier)
- La nuit du 15 octobre (1869) (for Georges Jacobi, with Leterrier)
- Juanita (1883) (adaptation of Donna Juanita, for Renaud de Vilbac, with Leterrier)
- Le droit d'aînesse (1883) (for Francis Chassaigne, with Leterrier)
- Le roi de carreau (1883) (for Théodore Lajarte, with Leterrier)
- Volapük-Revue (1886) (for Andre Gedalge, with Busnach)
- La gamine de Paris (1887) (for Gaston Serpette, with Leterrier)
- L'oeuf rouge (1890) (for Edmond Audran, with Busnach)
- La fée aux chèvres (1891) (for Louis Varney, with Paul Ferrier)
- Le pays de l'or (1892) (for Léon Vasseur, with Chivot)

== Bibliography ==
- Vanloo, Albert (1913) Sur le plateau: souvenirs d'une librettiste. Paris

== Sources ==
- Smith, Christopher (1992), 'Vanloo, Albert' in The New Grove Dictionary of Opera, ed. Stanley Sadie (London) ISBN 0-333-73432-7
