= Mily-Meyer =

French opera singer

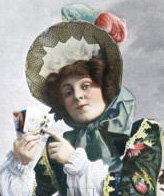
Mily-Meyer as Mademoiselle Lenormand in La revue retrospective, 1899

Émilie Mily Meyer, stage name 'Mily-Meyer' was a French soprano, born 1852 in Paris, died there in 1927, who for a quarter of a century became a major star of the Parisian operetta stage, and is described by Gänzl as an "impishly boyish yet obviously feminine soubrette".

== Career ==
Her professional début was at the Eldorado café-concert; she then went to the Théâtre de la Renaissance and appeared as the young duchess in the premiere of Le petit duc on 25 January 1878. Creations in La Camargo (1878), Petite Mademoiselle (1879) and Belle Lurette (1880) swiftly followed.

Mily-Meyer appeared at the Théâtre des Nouveautés as Kate in the French premiere of Rip and at the Théâtre des Bouffes Parisiens as Bianca in the first run of La Béarnaise in 1885. Also at Théâtre des Variétés was La princesse de Trébizonde, while at the Théâtre des Folies-Dramatiques she was in the French premiere of Millöcker's La Demoiselle de Belleville (Die Jungfrau von Belleville).

Among many other operettas in which she sang were Roi de Carreau (1885) and Babolin (1884) at the Théâtre des Folies-Dramatiques (November 1884); La vie mondaine (1885) at the Théâtre des Nouveautés, and at the Théâtre des Bouffes Parisiens, La Béarnaise (1885), as Benjamine in Joséphine (1886), Gamine de Paris (1887), Le Retour d'Ulysse (1889), Le mari de la reine (1889), Cendrillonnette (1890) and revivals of Les petits mousquetaires and La Princesse de Trébizonde. Back at the Renaissance, she created La gardeuse d'oies (1888) and La petite Poucette (1891); followed by La Demoiselle du Téléphone (1891) at the Nouveautés, Fleur de Vertu (1894) at the Bouffes, and L'Élève du Conservatoire (1894) at the Théâtre des Menus-Plaisirs.

Chabrier dedicated his 1889 'Villanelle des petits canards' to Mily-Meyer, who gave the song's premiere at the Théâtre du Vaudeville on 7 March 1890.

Mily-Meyer continued to appear on stage up until 1906.
