= La Béarnaise =

Opéra comique in three acts

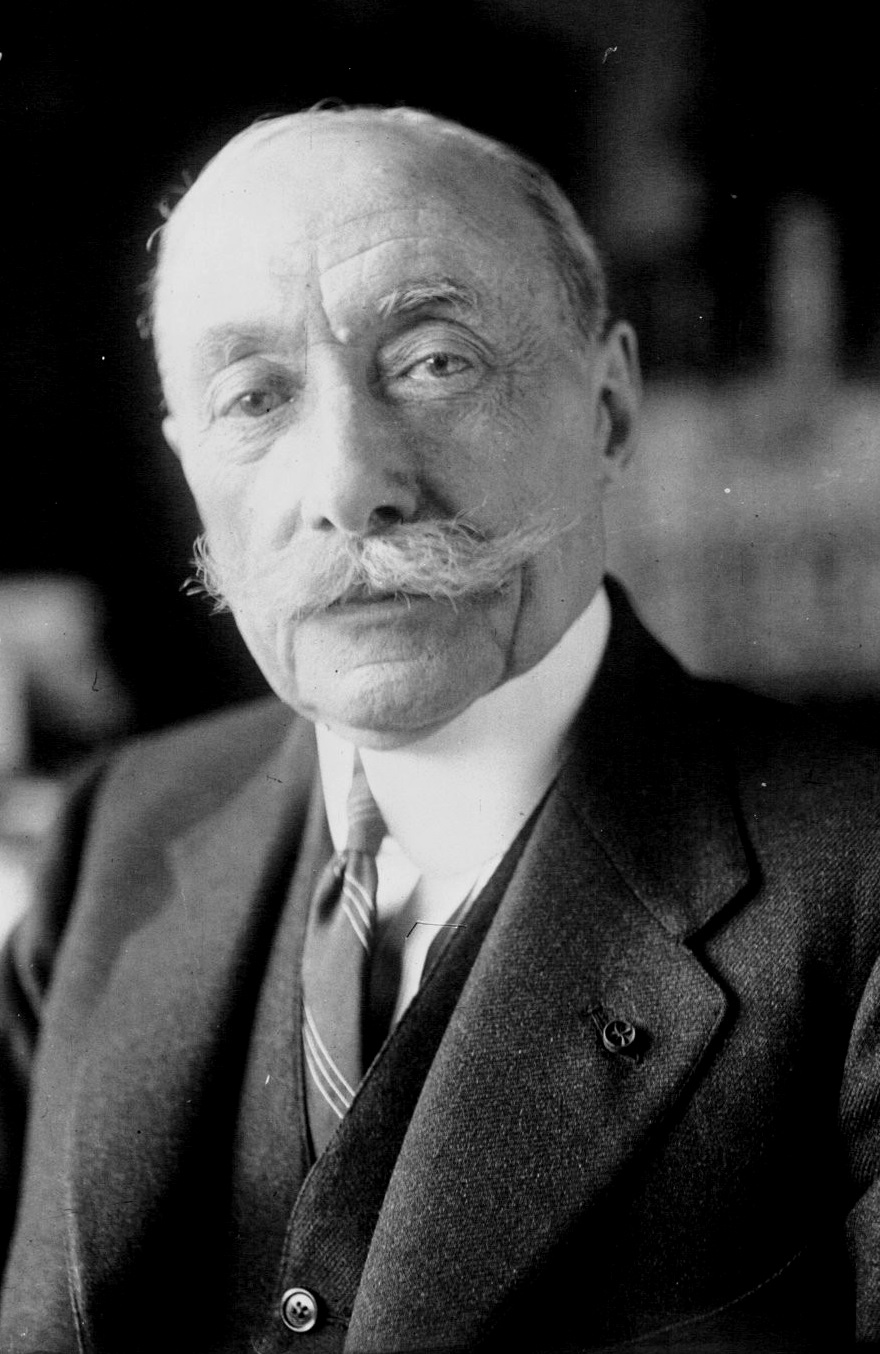
André Messager, 1921

La Béarnaise (French pronunciation: [la beaʁnɛz]) is an opéra comique in three acts of 1885, with music by André Messager and a French libretto by Eugène Leterrier and Albert Vanloo.

== History ==
The success of La fauvette du temple in early 1885 began to open doors for Messager. Delphine Ugalde, who had just taken over the direction of the Bouffes-Parisiens, staged as her first production La Béarnaise. When the stage rehearsals began, the principal singer was found to be unable to sustain the lead role. At first it was thought that Ugalde's daughter Marguerite would take over, but the director then approached Jeanne Granier, who, after only having heard a play-through of the first act, took on the double part of Jacquette-Jacquet. Coming out of semi-retirement, Granier made the success of the piece.

La Béarnaise was first performed at the Bouffes-Parisiens on 12 December 1885, achieving 20 performances that year and 44 in 1886; a vocal score being published in the following year. It was an immediate success and was performed in London in 1886 and New York the following year, under the title Jacquetta. It was also produced in Budapest in 1886 and in Prague in 1892, and at the Trianon-Lyrique in Paris on 11 March 1925.

== Roles ==
Role	Voice type	Premiere Cast, 12 December 1885 (Conductor: André Messager)
Jacquette	soprano	Jeanne Granier
Bianca	soprano	Mily-Meyer
Bettina	soprano	Feljas
L'hôtelière	mezzo-soprano	Ducouret
Carlo	tenor	B Paravicini
Perpignac	baritone	Eugène Vauthier
Pomponio	baritone	Édouard Maugé
Girafo	bass	Gerpré
Le duc	tenor	Murator
Grabasson	baritone	Durieu
Cadet	baritone	Guerchot

== Synopsis ==
=== Act 1 ===
Captain Perpignac from Béarn, is a braggard, woman-chaser and swordsman. Arrived in Paris, he had started a liaison with Gabrielle, but, caught by King Henri IV, he is sent to Italy. When there Perpignac discovers that he is neither ambassador nor officer but an outcast suspect having dishonoured his royal master.

For forty days he is forbidden to approach a woman. No sooner has he begun his punishment than he espies a pretty widow, named Bianca. Luckily, at the same time he is recognized by his cousin Jacquette, secretly in love with him, and travelling in search of him. Jacquette has entered Parme just in time as Perpignac is about to disobey the orders of King Henri. As a loving friend, she covers for her cousin by dressing up in men's clothes, compromises Bianca thus forcing the marriage to take place.

=== Act 2 ===
Jacquette, now Jacquet, dressed all in white, reluctantly goes to marry the young and beautiful Bianca, but implores Perpignac to relieve her of the wedding night duty ... In the end, Bianca, who is loved by the chamberlain of the duke of Parme, gives in to the charms of this chevalier Pomponio, and the Béarnaise Jacquette returns to Béarn with Perpignac.

The music of the second act was received more warmly than the first, with Maugé's couplets "Très souvent à la devanture" encored, along with Vauthier's madrigal "Chacun, madame, à votre aspect", Granier's song "C'est du vin de Gascogne" and Mily Mayer's couplets "Pour un détail, une nuance". Also noted was a berceuse "Fais nono, mon bel enfantoux !". Critics also admired the suppler orchestration and gentler style compared to Messager's contemporaries.
