= La Belle au bois dormant (Lecocq) =

1900 opéra comique in three acts

Vocal score, 1900

La Belle au bois dormant (The Sleeping Beauty in the Woods) is an opéra comique in three acts with music by Charles Lecocq and words by Albert Vanloo and Georges Duval. It is a retelling, with modifications, of the fairy tale Sleeping Beauty. The princess wakes from her long sleep and falls in love not with Prince Charming but with his companion, but all is well in the end.

The opera opened at the Théâtre des Bouffes-Parisiens, Paris, in February 1900, and had a run of 28 performances.

== Background and premiere ==
By the 1890s Lecocq's most successful days were behind him. In the 1870s his successes had included Giroflé-Girofla and La Fille de Madame Angot. He had written very popular operas in the early 1880s, but of his later comic pieces only Ninette (1896) ran for more than the 100 performances regarded as the criterion of success in Parisian theatres of the time. After that, the most successful of his younger rivals, André Messager, wrote two highly successful pieces for the Théâtre des Bouffes-Parisiens, Les p'tites Michu (1897) and Véronique (1898), in collaboration with the librettists Albert Vanloo and Georges Duval. With the same librettists, Lecocq wrote his version of the Sleeping Beauty story for the same theatre. The cast included many popular performers including Jean Périer, Anne Tariol-Baugé, Maurice Lamy and Brunais. The new leading lady, Mlle. de Hally (sometimes billed as Dehelly, née Valentine Eugénie Stratsaert), a 23-year-old alumna of the Conservatoire de Paris, appeared in this production by arrangement with the Opéra-Comique, of which she was a regular company member.

The opera opened at the Bouffes-Parisiens on 19 February 1900, and ran for 28 performances before being withdrawn in favour of a revival of Véronique.

== Original cast ==
- Olivier, a falconer – Jean Périer
- Alcindor VI – Victor Regnard
- Prince Charming, his son – M. Brunais
- Le Taupier, a wizard – Maurice Lamy
- Gulistan – M. Poudrier
- Marcassin – M. Casa
- Loyse, the sleeping beauty – Mlle. de Hally
- Aurore, a fairy – Anne Tariol-Baugé
- Rosalinde – Léonie Laporte
- Margot – Gabrielle Dziri

Source: Le Photo-programme.

== Synopsis ==
In a chamber in a palace on the edge of a forest a young princess has been sleeping for a hundred years. Because of a magical spell, she can only be claimed by a bold prince who ventures into the enchanted forest to rescue her. The action takes place on the day when, according to the spell, the beautiful princess Loyse is due to wake from her century of sleep.

Alcindor VI, lord of the country and Prince Charming's father, has decided that his son will go to the rescue of the princess; but Prince Charming, a gauche and timid young man, dares not venture out alone in the forest. Olivier the Falconer, who fears nothing, offers to accompany him. They have set out on the expedition, the success of which should give the prince a wife. But a struggle begins between the beneficent fairy Aurore and the Taupier, a wicked old wizard, who has sworn that the Sleeping Beauty will scorn her Prince Charming.

The Sleeping Beauty awakes, falls for the handsome falconer and looks with derision on her supposed fiancé, the prince. But, much though she would like to marry the one she loves, she must sleep again for a hundred years if she does not marry the prince before midnight. The beneficent fairy, who distrusted the old Taupier and foresaw the future, had had the real prince raised by a forester and his family, while the supposed Prince Charming was really only the son of the forester. The substitution is revealed in the last act, and the Sleeping Beauty marries her falconer who assumes his true identity.

Source: Le Photo-programme.

== Numbers ==
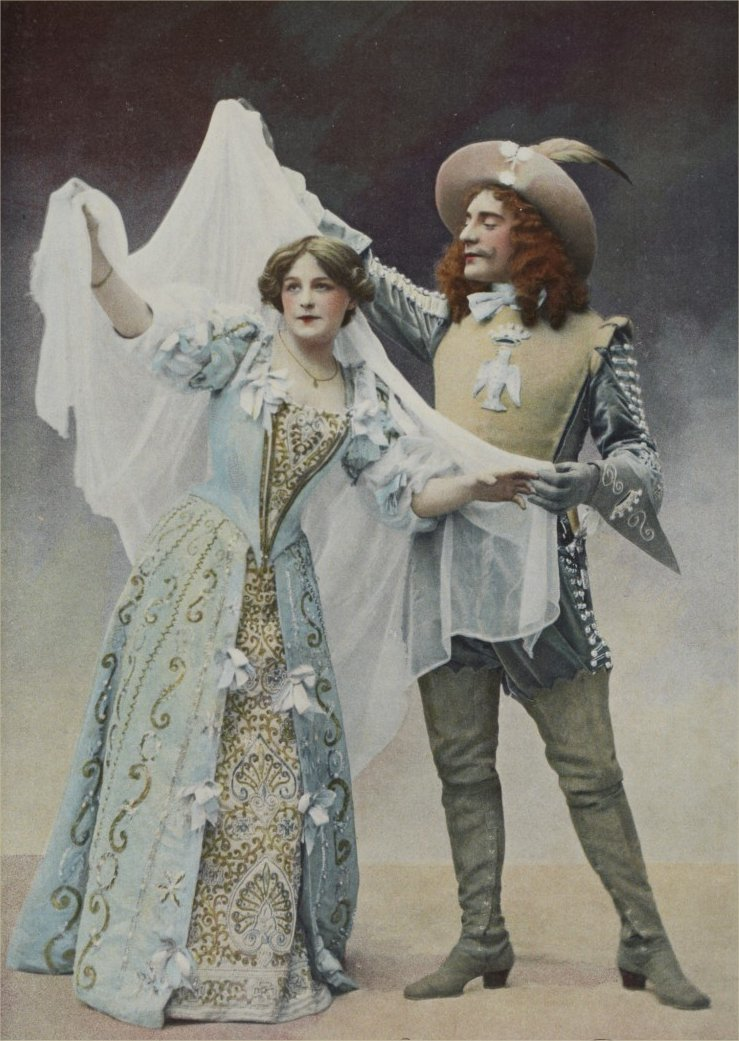
Loyse (Mlle. De Hally) and Olivier (Jean Périer)

- Act 1
  - Chorus – Du printemps célébrons la fête
  - Couplets – Margot, n'est pas, j'en fais l'aveu (Margot)
  - Chorus – C'est lui, c'est Olivier
  - Air – Pour dompter les oiseaux des airs (Olivier)
  - Couplets – Le gibier que je chasse (Taupier)
  - Couplets – Fanfreluches, fanfreluchons (Aurore)
  - Duet – Il était une princesse (Aurore, Olivier)
  - Ensemble – Vive le roi! (Alcindor, Prince, Gulistan, Chorus)
  - Buffo quartet – Ceci, mon enfant, c'est un casque (Alcindor, Prince, Gulistan, Margot)
  - Trio – Prêt à vous protéger (Olivier, Prince, Aurore)
  - Finale:
    - Chorus of fairies – Depuis cent ans
    - Duet – Enfin, nous y voici (Olivier, Prince)
    - Couplets – Oui! je m'en souviens maintenant (Loyse)
- Act 2
  - Introduction
  - Ensemble – En tierce! en quarte! en quinte!
  - Couplets – Lorsque, moi, le beau Gulistan
  - Chorus – Honneur!
  - Scène – Mon père, voici la promise (Alcindor, Prince, Gulistan, Loyse, Rosalinde)
  - Gavotte – Otons cette collerette (Aurore)
  - Minuet – Ceci, c'est (Aurore)
  - Duet – Dites-moi e mot en usage (Loyse, Olivier)
  - Quartet – Savez-vous, ô beau Gulistan (Rosalinde, Gulistan, Loyse, Olivier)
  - Ensemble – Ah! Coquettes! (Rosalinde, Gulistan, Loyse, Olivier, Chorus)
  - Romance – Mon âme était tout joyeuse (Loyse)
  - Finale:
    - Chorus – Nous attendons votre repose
    - Couplets – Vous êtes-vous, dans une glace (Loyse)
    - Ensemble – Sonnez, clochettes! (All)
- Act 3
  - Chorus – De fleur et de guirlandes
  - Couplets – Un jeune cœur qui sommeille (Aurora)
  - Ariette – Qui vent connaitre (Taupier)
  - Couplets and duet – Al! le joli voyage (Olivier, Loyse)
  - Rêverie – Que du rendez-vous l'heure est lente (Rosalinde)
  - Duet – Pendant une heure (Loyse, Olivier)
  - Couplets – Aiguille trop vigilante (Loyse)
  - Couplets – C'est de toi qui je ris! (Aurore)
  - Finale - Chorus

Source: Le Photo-programme.

== Critical reception ==
In Les Annales du théâtre et de la musique, Edmond Stoullig reported on the librettists' treatment of the story, and doubted that their changes to the traditional version were wise. Of the music, he said merely that it was a great pity that Lecocq had failed to recapture the inspiration he had shown in La fille de Madame Angot and other earlier works.

== References and sources ==
=== Sources ===
- Larcher, G. (1900). Le Photo-programme, Saison théâtrale 1899–1900. Paris: Bourse de Commerce.
- Stoullig, Edmond (1897). Les Annales du théâtre et de la musique, 1896. Paris: Ollendorf. OCLC 762314202.
- Stoullig, Edmond (1901). Les Annales du théâtre et de la musique, 1900. Paris: Ollendorf. OCLC 82682348.
