= Eugène Leterrier =

French librettist

Leterrier by Nadar

Eugène Leterrier (French pronunciation: [øʒɛn lətɛʁje]; 1843 – 22 December 1884 in Paris) was a French librettist.

Leterrier worked at the Hôtel de Ville in Paris but then turned to the theatre. He mainly collaborated in writing libretti with Albert Vanloo. Their working relationship was productive and stress-free.

In collaboration with Vanloo success first came with Giroflé-Girofla and La petite mariée for Lecocq. The pair went on to provide libretti for Potier, Jacob, de Villebichet, Offenbach, Chabrier, Lacome and Messager. Chabrier was particularly pleased with the honest and hard work he enjoyed with the librettists for his first staged works.

== List of libretti ==
For Alexandre Charles Lecocq

- Giroflé-Girofla (1874) (with Albert Vanloo)
- La petite mariée (1875) (with Vanloo)
- La Marjolaine (1877) (with Vanloo)
- La Camargo (1879) (with Vanloo)
- La jolie persane (1879) (with Vanloo)
- L'arbre de Noël (1880) (with Vanloo and Arnold Mortier)
- Le jour et la nuit (1881) (with Vanloo)

For Jacques Offenbach

- Le voyage dans la lune (1875) (with Vanloo and Mortier)
- Mam'zelle Moucheron (1881) (with Vanloo)

For Emmanuel Chabrier

- L'étoile (1877) (with Vanloo)
- Une éducation manquée (1879) (with Vanloo)

For Paul Lacôme

- Le beau Nicolas (1880) (with Vanloo)
- La gardeuse d’oies (1888) (with Vanloo)

For other composers

- Le petit poucet (1868) (for Laurent de Rillé, with Vanloo)
- La nuit du 15 octobre (1869) (for Georges Jacobi, with Vanloo)
- Juanita (1883) (adaptation of Donna Juanita, for Renaud de Vilbac, with Vanloo)
- Le droit d'aînesse (1883) (for Francis Chassaigne, with Vanloo)
- Le roi de carreau (1883) (for Théodore Lajarte, with Vanloo)
- La Béarnaise (1885) (for André Messager, with Vanloo)
- La gamine de Paris (1887) (for Gaston Serpette, with Vanloo)
