= Leterrier =

Leterrier is a surname. Notable people with the surname include:

- Catherine Leterrier (born 1942), French costume designer
- Eugène Leterrier (1843–1884), French librettist
- François Leterrier (1929–2020), French film director and actor
- Louis Leterrier (born 1973), French film director
