= Fernand Samuel =

French theatre director

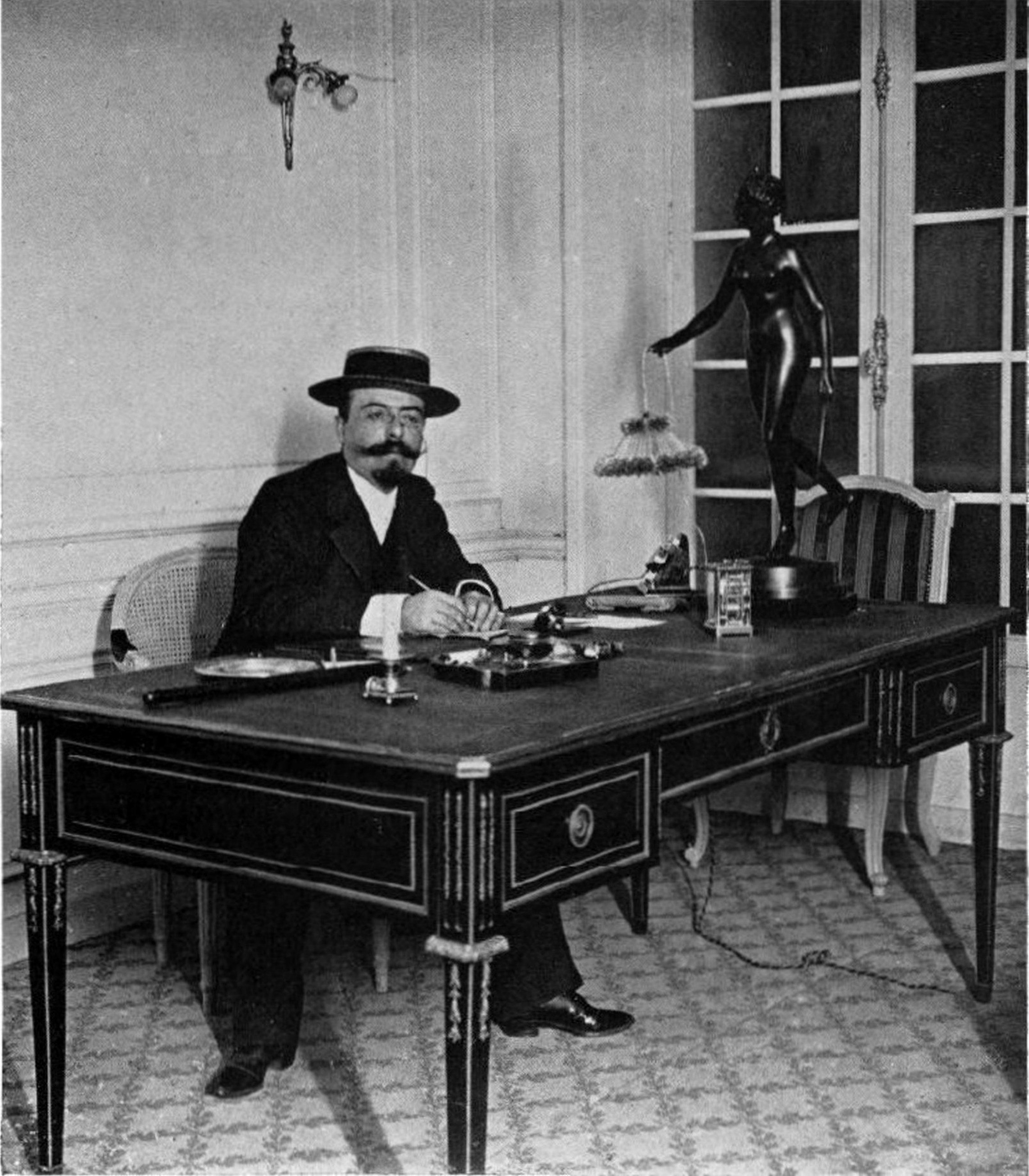
Samuel at his desk in the Théâtre des Variétés, 1900

Fernand Samuel was the professional name of Adolphe-Amédée Louveau (2 July 1862 – 21 December 1914), a French theatre director and producer. He was director of the Théâtre de la Renaissance, Paris from 1884 to 1892 and the Théâtre des Variétés from 1892 to 1914.

== Life and career ==
Samuel was born in Rome on 2 July 1862. He came from a theatrical family, and as young man in the early 1880s wrote a column for the Globe newspaper and was a leading member of a well-known amateur troupe, "Arts intimes", in Paris. Encouraged by Francisque Sarcey he became lessee of the Théâtre de la Renaissance, Paris in 1884. He appointed his friend Georges Feydeau as secretary general to the theatre, and in 1886 Samuel presented Feydeau's first full-length play, Tailleur pour dames.

Samuel established a substantial reputation at the Renaissance, where he remained in charge until 1892. After he moved from there to the Théâtre des Variétés in the same year his prestige increased and he became known as "Samuel le Magnifique". He assembled a company of leading stars including Jeanne Granier, Ève Lavallière (whom he married), Albert Brasseur, Max Dearly and others, and presented a series of successful plays. When he died, shortly after the start of the First World War, Le Figaro said that he would be known as "one of our great pre-war directors".

Samuel died at Cap d'Ail, Alpes-Maritimes on 21 December 1914.

== References and sources ==
=== Sources ===
- Gidel, Henry (1991). Georges Feydeau (in French). Paris: Flammarion. ISBN 978-2-08-066280-4.
