= Le Cygne (ballet) =

Ballet composed by Charles Lecocq

Cover of piano score, 1899

Le Cygne (French pronunciation: [lə siɲ]) is a one-act ballet, with choreography by Mariquita, a scenario by Catulle Mendès, and music by Charles Lecocq. It was first staged at the Opéra-Comique, Paris on 20 April 1899. It is loosely based on the classical myth of Leda and the Swan.

== Cast ==
- Pierrot – Mdlle. Pepa Invernizzi
- La Dryade – Mdlle. Boni
- Le Petit Faune – Mddle. Chasles
- Léda – Mdlle. Dehelli
- Le Chant du Cygne (singer) – Mdlle. Davies

Conductor: Alexandre Luigini

Source: 1899 piano score.

== Synopsis ==
Dehelly as Leda

Pierrot has happened across Leda bathing in the river Eurotas. He falls in love with her, and returns at dawn the next day hoping to catch sight of her again. A little faun, seeing the boy's sadness, offers him wine, fruits, and flowers, and summons nymphs and dryads from the adjoining laurel grove. They dance round him while he plays on a pipe, but he remains inconsolable. When music is heard in the distance announcing the arrival of Leda, with her attendants, he drives away the nymphs, dryads, and faun, and conceals himself among the flowers. Leda prepares for her morning bath, expressing the hope that she will again meet the beautiful swan – Zeus in disguise – who often meets her at this spot. She and her women undress and plunge into the river; the swan appears, gliding towards Leda. The attendants raise their cloaks to hide from view the embrace with which the queen welcomes the bird; but Pierrot has seen all, and, furious with jealousy, he strikes the swan with his stick, inflicting a mortal wound, from which the bird soon dies, singing before he expires.

Struck with remorse, Pierrot runs to hide himself in the laurel grove, but Leda wounds him with an arrow. She then orders her attendants to place the swan on a litter of branches and flowers; the funeral procession moves off, leaving Pierrot alone, weeping despairingly. The faun returns and advises him to impersonate the swan. He is white like his dead rival, and his wide sleeves resemble wings. If the moon goddess Selene would only bring on a momentary eclipse of the sun the deception could be easily carried out. The sky darkens; Leda and her women return, and are astonished when another swan comes gliding on the river towards the queen. Night comes on suddenly, but soon daylight returns, and in a final apotheosis there appear huge eggs, from which hatch three little Pierrots with swans' wings on their backs.

== Numbers ==
- Introduction
- Rêverie de Pierrot et pantomime
- Danse du petit faune
- Danse des nymphes
- Pas de l'hamadryade
- Ensemble des nymphes
- Cortège de Léda
- Valse lente
- Prière à Vénus
- Scène du bain
- Apparition du cygne
- Le chant du cygne
- Pantomime
- Cérémonie funèbre
- Variation du petit faune
- Ensemble final

Source: 1899 piano score.

== Critical reception ==
The reviewer for The Era found the story ingenious, but too sexually explicit for the respectable audiences of the Opéra-Comique. He thought Lecocq's music "tuneful enough, but commonplace, jingling—by no means in harmony with M. Mendes' light, poetical, fantastic theme". The choreography and staging were praised.

== References and sources ==
=== Sources ===
- Lecocq, Charles (1899). Le Cygne piano score (PDF). Paris: Heugel. OCLC 846131319.
