= Jeanne Granier =

French soprano (1852–1939)

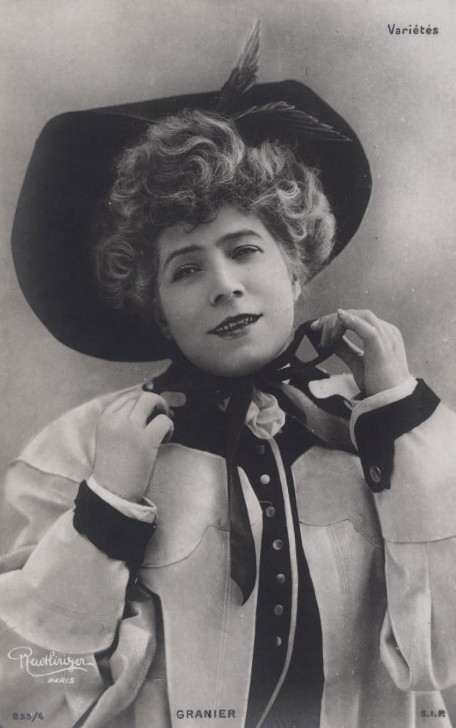
Jeanne Granier, 1902

Jeanne Granier (French pronunciation: [ʒan ɡʁanje]; 31 March 1852 – 18 or 19 December 1939) was a French soprano, born and died in Paris, whose career was centred on the French capital.

== Life and career ==
Marie Jeanne Ernestine Granier, the daughter of an actress, was born in Paris on March 31, 1852. She was a pupil of Madame Barthe-Banderali, studying both opéra-comique and Italian music. Her debut was in 1873 at the Théâtre de la Renaissance, replacing at short notice Louise Théo as Rose Michon in the opening run of La jolie parfumeuse. Thus noticed by Offenbach, she went on to create Giroflé-Girofla (Paris premiere), title role in La Marjolaine, the title role in Le petit duc, Janot, Ninella, Mme le Diable, Belle Lurette and Fanfreluche.

She was known both as an actress and singer, whose admirers included Edward VII.

Jeanne Granier is mentioned in Proust's À la recherche du temps perdu.

For the gala re-opening of La Vie de Bohème at the Théâtre de l'Odéon in 1875, Granier appeared in Act I as Musette, singing "La Jeunesse et l'amour" (with words by Meilhac and music by Massenet); likewise a song for Esmeralda "Mon père est oyseau, ma mère est oyselle" was composed by Massenet in 1879 for her appearance as Esmeralda in Notre-Dame de Paris. On 15 October 1876, she appeared in a benefit performance of Berengère et Anatole at the Théâtre de la Renaissance.

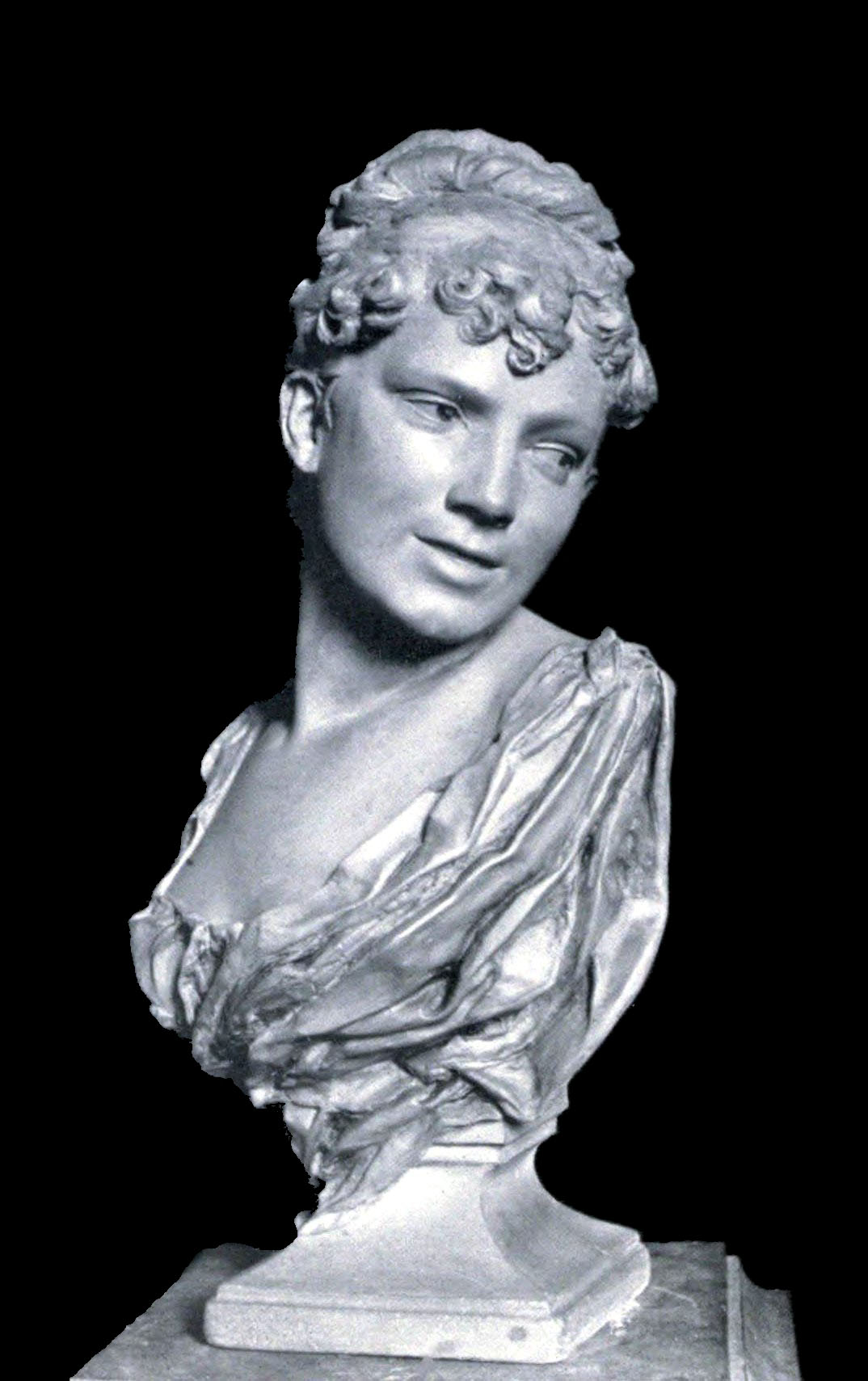
Bust of Granier by Francis de Saint-Vidal.

The title role in Lecocq's Le petit Duc became something of a signature role for Granier; not only did she appear in the premiere on 25 January 1878 at the Théâtre de la Renaissance, she also sang the part in revivals at that theatre in 1879, 1881 and 1883; then appeared with José Dupuis in productions at the Éden-Théâtre in 1888 and the Théâtre des Variétés in 1890.

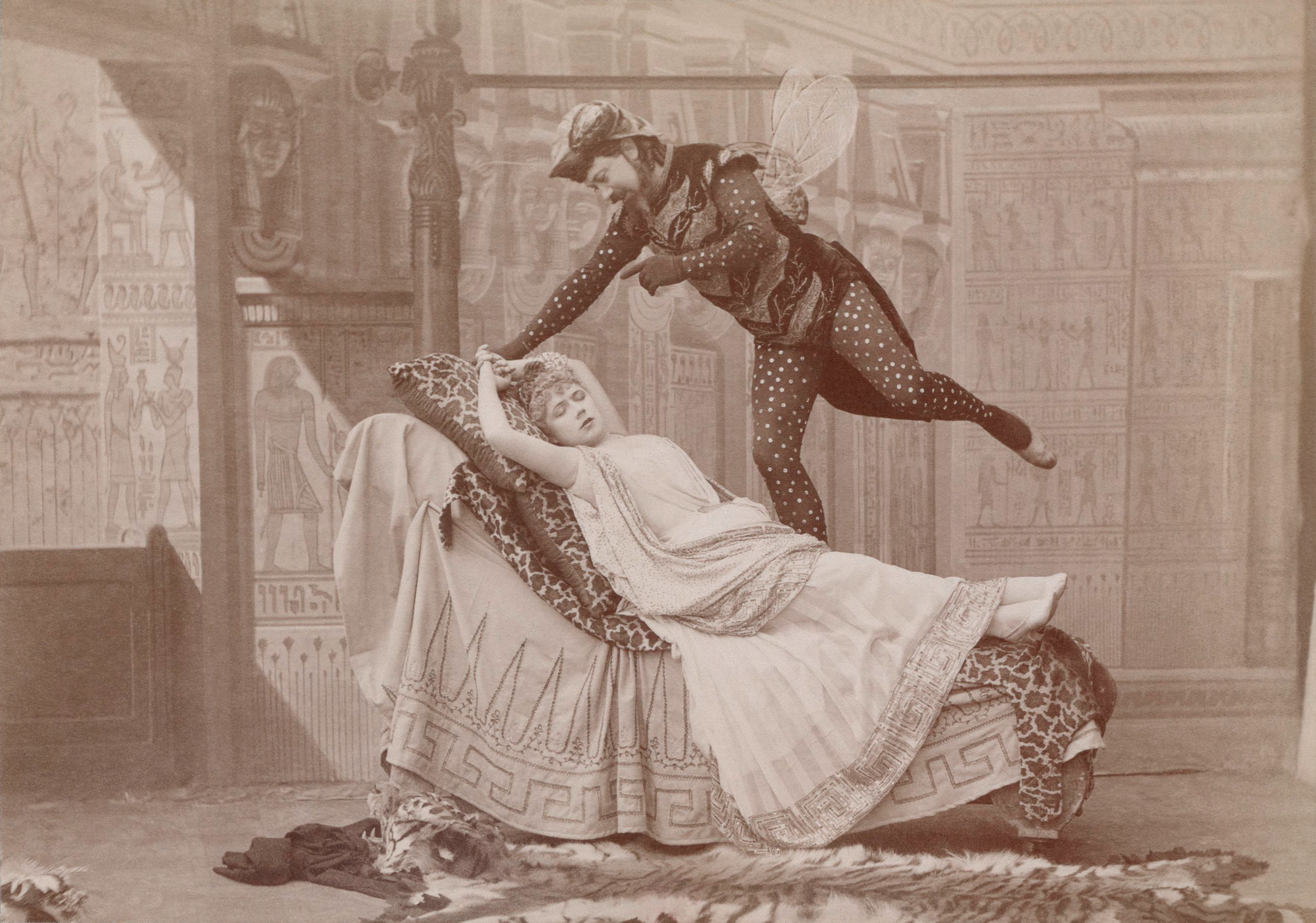
As Eurydice in the 1887 revival of Orpheus in the Underworld

At the Théâtre des Variétés Granier appeared in major roles in revivals of La belle Hélène, Barbe-bleue, and La Grande-Duchesse de Gérolstein. Her other premieres at various Paris theatres included Mlle Gavroche (at the Variétés), Jacquette-Jaquet in La Béarnaise (Bouffes), Therèse in La cigale et la fourmi (Gaité) and Les saturnales (Nouveautés).

Chabrier dedicated his 1889 song "Ballade des gros dindons" to Granier.

Later stage appearances included Joujou by Henri Bernstein at the Théâtre du Gymnase in 1902, L'Habit vert by Robert de Flers and Gaston Arman de Caillavet at the Théâtre des Variétés in 1912, Le Ruisseau by Pierre Wolff at the Théâtre de la Porte Saint-Martin in 1913 and Madame by Abel Hermant and Alfred Savoir at the Théâtre de la Porte Saint-Martin in 1914.
