= Le Petit Duc =

Opéra comique in three acts by Charles Lecocq

Poster for 1888 revival at the Théâtre Eden

Le Petit Duc (French pronunciation: [lə pəti dyk]; The Little Duke) is an opéra comique in three acts by Charles Lecocq. The French libretto was by Henri Meilhac and Ludovic Halévy.

== Performance history ==
The opera was first presented at the Théâtre de la Renaissance, Paris, on 25 January 1878 and revived there in the 1879, 1881 and 1883 seasons with Granier. The first run – 301 performances – confirmed the stardom of Jeanne Granier and was a major financial success for the theatre, which took 6,000 francs a night.

The United States premiere was given on Broadway at Booth's Theatre on 17 March 1879 with a cast that included William H. MacDonald as Montlandry and Florence Ellis in the title role. It was staged again in Paris at the Théâtre Eden in 1888 (with Granier and Dupuis), the Bouffes-Parisiens in 1897 and the Théâtre des Variétés in 1904. It continued to be seen regularly in France up to the Second World War.

It was first performed in London on 27 April 1878, and then in 1881 Granier, Mily-Meyer, Alexandre, Jolly and Desclauzas appeared in a production. Its popularity was such that 1878 also saw premieres in Vienna, Berlin, Prague, Brussels, Amsterdam, Stockholm, Madrid, Turin and Budapest. New York (and Mexico) first saw the piece in March 1879, with other productions in America showing up to 1896.

== Roles and role creators ==
Role	Voice type	Premiere Cast, 25 January 1878 (Conductor: Raoul Madier de Montjau)
Duke of Parthenay	soprano	Jeanne Granier
Duchess Blanche of Parthenay	soprano	Mily-Meyer
Diane de Château-Lansac	mezzo-soprano	Marie Desclauzas
Frimousse	tenor	Jean-François Berthelier
Montlandry	baritone	Eugène Vauthier
De la Roche-Tonnerre	soprano	Léa d'Asco
De Navaille	tenor	Urbain
Bernard		Caliste
De Monchevrier		Elim
De Tanneville		Bovet
De Champvallier		Hervier
De Mérignac		Deberg
De Nancey		Desclos
De Pontgrivard		Duchosal
De Champlâtre	soprano	Piccolo
Julien		Panseron
Henri		Ribe
Helene		Lasselin
Gontran		Dianie
Gaston		Davenay
Saint Anémoine	mezzo-soprano	
Courtiers, soldiers, pupils

== Synopsis ==
The first act of the opera is set in the Oeil-de-Boeuf at Versailles. The very young Duke of Parthenay has been married by his family to Blanche de Cambry, the young daughter of a rich family. Two tutors, Frimousse and Montlandry, are arguing. Although the adolescent couple would like to spend some time together, the families decide that as they are both very young, the wife should go to a private school for aristocratic ladies for two years, while the furious young husband is sent off to be the colonel of a regiment. He wants to get back to his wife, and leads the regiment to the convent school.

The second act opens at the ladies college in Lunéville run by Diane de Château-Lansac, and where Frimousse is teaching the girls. The principal learns that the regiment of Parthenay has surrounded her school. The little duke has meanwhile taken the disguise of a peasant girl while his men lay siege, and manages to gain entry to the school and meet his wife. However, the principal discovers them and tells him that war has broken out at the frontier. He and his men are forced to leave, along with Frimousse, who is dragged from his hiding place to go with them.

The setting for the third act, a camp by a battlefield, sees the duke's regiment arrive in time to help win victory for the French troops. Returning to his tent, the little duke discovers there his Blanche, who has run away from the school. As a recompense he is allowed to be fully reunited with his wife and they set off for Versailles to bring news of the French victory to the king.

== Recordings ==
A recording of thirteen excerpts was made at the Théâtre des Champs-Élysées in Paris in 1953 with Nadine Renaux, Liliane Berton, Willy Clément, René Hérent and Freda Betti, conducted by Jules Gressier.
