= Georges Duval (journalist) =

French journalist and playwright (1847–1919)

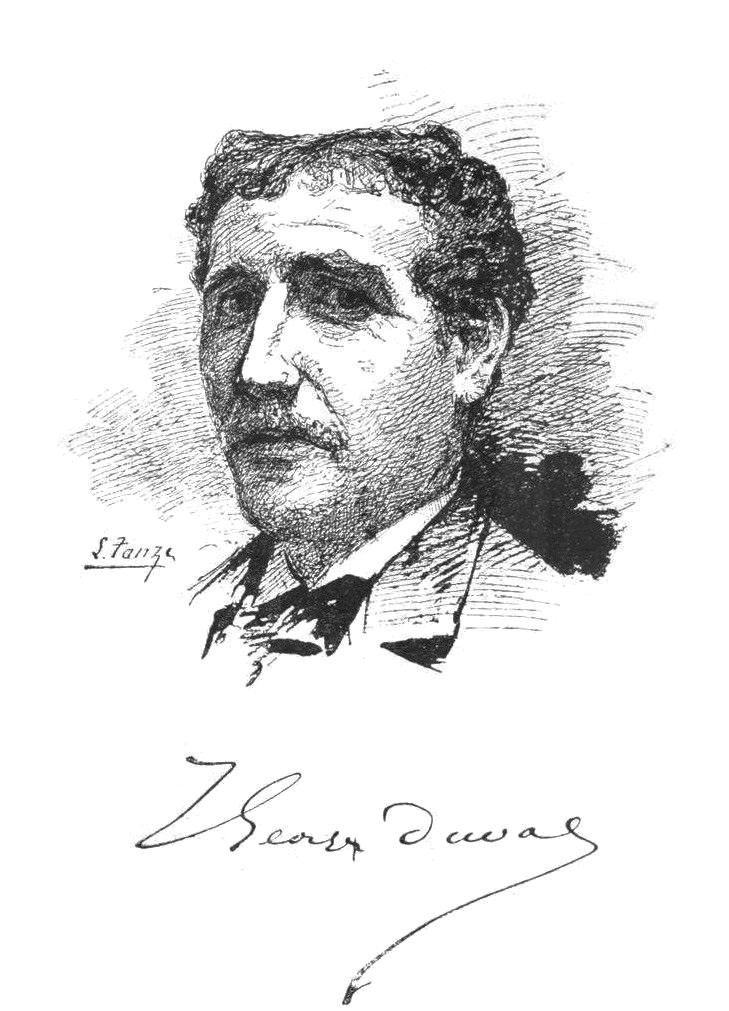
- Portrait by Léon Tanzi and Georges Duval's signature (1886).
- Born: 2 February 1847; Paris
- Died: 23 September 1919 (aged 72)
- Occupations: Journalist; Playwright

Georges Duval (2 February 1847 – 23 September 1919) was a French journalist and playwright.

== Biography ==
Georges Duval was a columnist at Le Gaulois under the pseudonyms Claude Rieux and Tabartin. He also collaborated with the newspaper L'Événement.

In 1883, Guy de Maupassant dedicated him his short story Le Cas de madame Luneau.

His greatest theatrical success was the comédie en vaudeville Coquin de printemps, composed in 1888 with Adolphe Jaime. This play was revived in Broadway in 1906 by Richard Carle under the title Spring Chicken. In 1898, he also wrote with Albert Vanloo, the libretto of the operetta Véronique by André Messager.

In 1892, he was chief editor of La Libre Parole.

== Works ==
Comedies

- 1874: Madame Mascarille, comedy in one act and in verse (Théâtre de Cluny)
- 1876: Aux quatre coins, one-act comedy (Théâtre des Bouffe-Parisien)
- 1880: Voltaire chez Houdon, comedy in one act and in verse
- Le Petit Bleu, one-act comedy
- La Bagasse, three-act comedy
- Le Hanneton d'Héloïse, four-act vaudeville
- La Pie au nid, three-act comédie en vaudeville
- Adieu Cocotte !, three-act comedy
- Le Remplaçant, three-act comedy
- Le Voyage autour du Code, three-act comedy
- Le Coup de Fouet, three-act comedy

Other

- 1875: Le Tour du monde en 80 minutes, three-act revue
- 1878: Artistes et cabotins (1878)
- 1879: Histoire de la littérature révolutionnaire
- 1880: La Morte galante, novel
- 1880: Les Petites Abraham
- 1881: Vauluisant et Bouleau
- 1881: Un Amour sous la Révolution
- 1881: Le Miracle de l'abbé Dulac
- 1883: Le Premier Amant
- 1884: Vieille histoire
- 1884: Les Orphelins d'Amsterdam
- 1884–1889: Le Carnaval parisien
- 1885: Laurette
- 1886: L'Homme à la plume noire
- 1886: Un Coup de fusil
- 1886: Paris qui rit
- 1887: Le Tonnelier
- Mai 1871
- 1887: Une Virginité
- 1888: Coquin de printemps !, three-act vaudeville with Adolphe Jaime
- 1898: Véronique, operetta (music by André Messager), with Albert Vanloo.
- Les Colères du Fleuve, à-propos in verse
