= Alfred Deléhelle =

French composer (1826–1893)

Jean-Charles-Alfred Deléhelle (12 January 1826 – 1893) was a French composer.

Born in Paris, Deléhelle studied at the Conservatoire de Paris, where he was a pupil of Hippolyte Colet and Adolphe Adam. In 1851, he won the Premier Grand Prix de Rome with the cantata Le Prisonnier.

After a stay at the Villa Medici in Rome and a trip to Naples and through several German cities, Deléhelle settled as a composer in Paris. 1859 his operetta L'Ile d'Amour was premiered at the Théâtre des Bouffes-Parisiens after a libretto by Camille du Locle. It was praised by the critics and had success with the audience, although it had to assert itself against the competition of a simultaneously played operetta by Léo Delibes.

Only two other works by Deléhelle have survived: the opéra comique Monsieur Policinelle, premiered at the Théâtre de l'Athénée in 1873, and the opera comique Don Spavento based on a libretto by Léon Morand and Gustave Wattier, premiered at the Koninklijke Schouwburg of The Hague in January 1883.
