= Donna Juanita =

Donna Juanita is a German language operetta in 3 acts by composer Franz von Suppé and librettists Zell and R. Genée. The opera premiered at the Carltheater in Vienna on 21 February 1880. The work was staged by the Metropolitan Opera in 1932 with Maria Jeritza in the title role and Artur Bodanzky leading the musical forces.
