= François Anatole Laurent de Rillé =

French composer, writer and musical theorist

Laurent de Rillé
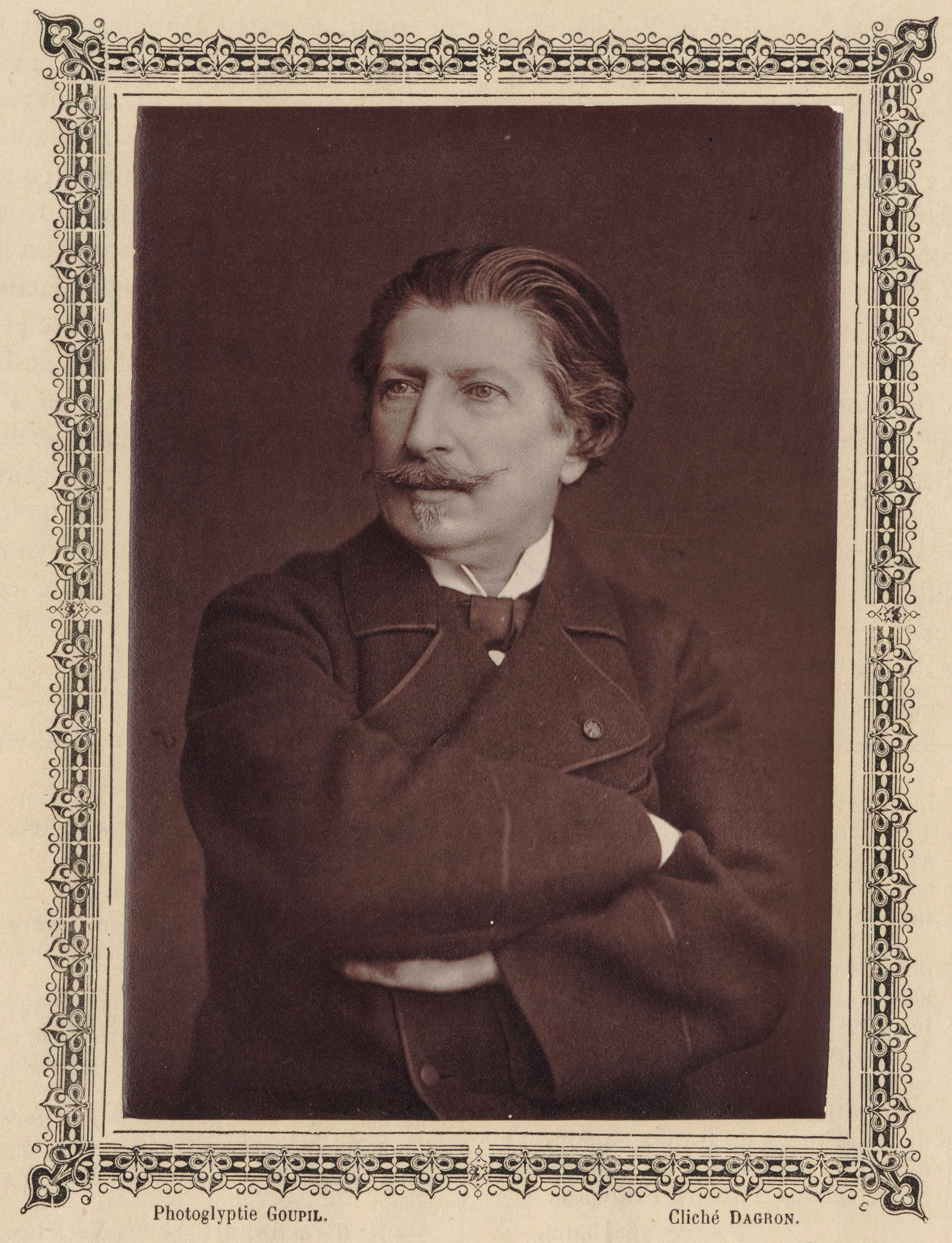
- Laurent de Rillé
- Born: 24 November 1828; Orléans
- Died: 26 August 1915 (aged 86); 9th arrondissement of Paris
- Other names: Composer, writer

François Anatole Laurent de Rillé (24 November 1828 – 26 August 1915), was a French composer, writer and musical theorist.

De Rillé composed a number of operettas and sacred music works, but his name is more frequently associated with the so-called "Orphéonist" movement, which had also Hector Berlioz and Charles Gounod among its members, which sought to increase the knowledge of music among popular classes by way of setting up male choir associations. The name comes from the first of these associations, founded in Paris, who named itself "Orphéon" (from Orpheus).

Thanks to the efforts of De Rillé, who not only wrote many music pieces for male choir and arranged pieces of widely known composers such as Verdi, Donizetti and Rossini but also books on how to organise a choir and train its members, the popularity of "orphéoniste" societies spread throughout France between the late 1800s and early 1900s, and as well in the United Kingdom, where A.J. Foxwell wrote English lyrics for many of his pieces.

Though most of the music composed by De Rillé is almost forgotten nowadays, his choral works, and particularly "Les Ruines de Gaza (The Destruction of Gaza)" and "Les Martyres aux Arènes" (Martyrs of the Arena), are still among the favorites of male choir societies.
