= Théâtre des Variétés =

Paris theatre open since 1807

Coordinates: 48°52′16″N 2°20′31″E

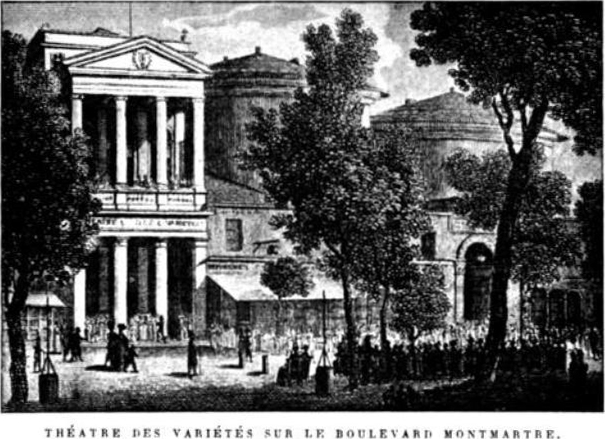
- The théâtre des Variétés, c. 1820
- Interactive map of Théâtre des Variétés
- Address: 7, boulevard Montmartre, 2nd. Paris; France

Construction
- Opened: 1807; 219 years ago
- Architects: Jacques Cellerier, Jean-Antoine Alavoine

Website
- www.theatre-des-varietes.fr

The Théâtre des Variétés (French pronunciation: [teɑtʁ de vaʁjete]) is a theatre and "salle de spectacles" at 7–8, boulevard Montmartre, 2nd arrondissement, in Paris. It was declared a monument historique in 1974.

== History ==
The theatre owed its creation to Mademoiselle Montansier (Marguerite Brunet). Imprisoned for debt in 1803 and frowned upon by the government, a decree of 1806 ordered her company to leave the Théâtre du Palais-Royal which then bore the name of "Variétés". The decree's aim was to move out Montansier's troupe to make room for the company from the neighbouring Théâtre-Français, which had stayed empty even as the Variétés-Montansier had enjoyed immense public favour. Strongly unhappy about having to leave the theatre by 1 January 1807, the 77-year-old Montansier gained an audience with Napoleon himself and received his help and protection. She thus reunited the "Société des Cinq", which directed her troupe, in order to found a new theatre, the one which stands at the side of the passage des Panoramas. It was inaugurated on 24 June 1807.

The liberalisation of the regulations of Parisian theatres in 1864 led the management of the Variétés to stage several key works by Offenbach. The composer seized the opportunities in the new legal framework to present his work to different audiences beyond the Bouffes-Parisiens, and the final six years of the Empire marked the high-point of his career, with La belle Hélène and La Grande-Duchesse de Gérolstein premiered there. The theatre also witnessed the first success in operetta of Charles Lecocq.

Suzanne Lagier made her début there at the age of thirteen in 1846, in the show Veuve de quinze ans, a role which was written for her by Pierre Adolphe Capelle. Ève Lavallière appeared in operettas and plays there from 1892 for twenty years in works by Offenbach, Feydeau and Audran. Albert Brasseur was a member of the Variétés company from 1891 playing in many productions including several Offenbach works La Vie parisienne, Les Brigands, La Belle Hélène and Orphée aux Enfers and many plays by Feydeau.

The theatre plays a prominent role in Émile Zola's 1880 novel, Nana, as the establishment in which the title character achieves celebrity with the premiere of La Blonde Vénus at the Théâtre des Variétés in April 1867 in the opening chapters.

== Other activities ==
In 2012 the theatre began to host technical conferences such as dotJS or dotScale.

== Premieres at the theatre ==
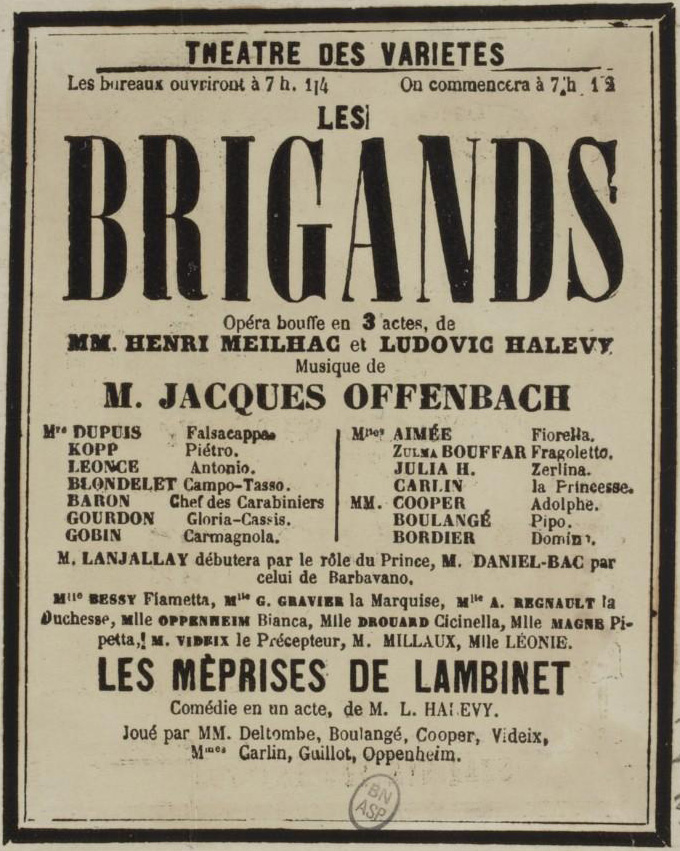
Poster for first run of Les Brigands at the Variétés, 1869

- 1833: La Modiste et le Lord, 2-act opera by Auguste Pilati
- 1856: L'Amour et Psyché, 1 act opera by Auguste Pilati
- 1864: La belle Hélène, opéra bouffe by Jacques Offenbach, libretto by Meilhac and Halévy
- 1866: Barbe-bleue by Jacques Offenbach, libretto by Meilhac and Halévy
- 1867: La Grande-Duchesse de Gérolstein, opéra bouffe by Jacques Offenbach, libretto by Meilhac and Halévy
- 1868: La Périchole, opéra bouffe by Jacques Offenbach, libretto by Meilhac and Halévy
- 1869: Les brigands, opéra bouffe by Jacques Offenbach, libretto by Meilhac and Halévy
- 1877: Le docteur Ox, opéra bouffe by Jacques Offenbach, libretto by Arnold Mortier and Philippe Gille
- 1883: Mam'zelle Nitouche, vaudeville-operette by Hervé
- 1907: L'Enfant prodigue, the first feature-length European film, directed by Michel Carré, fils
- 1923: Ciboulette, operetta by Reynaldo Hahn, libretto by Robert de Flers and Francis de Croisset
- 1946: César by Marcel Pagnol, after his film of the same name

== Directors ==
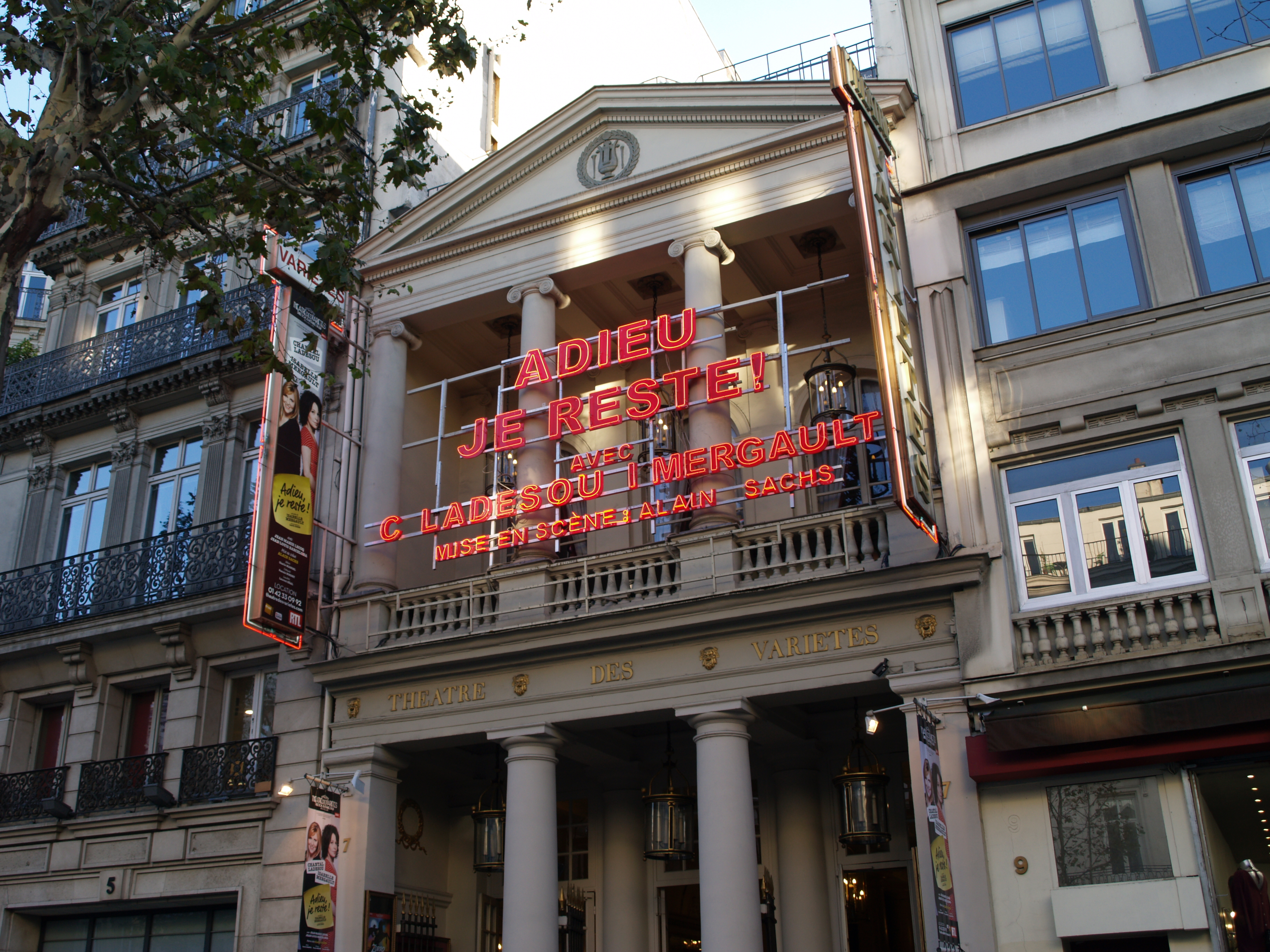
Théâtre des Variétés in 2012, on the bill the comedy Adieu, je reste!

- 1807–19 : Mlle Montansier
- 1820–30 : Mira Brunet
- 1930–36 : Armand Dartois
- 1836 : Jean-François Bayard
- 1837–39 : Philippe Pinel-Dumanoir
- 1839 : Jouslin de la Salle
- 1840 : M. Leroy
- 1840–47 : Nestor Roqueplan
- 1847–49 : M. Morin
- 1849–51 : M. Thibeaudeau-Milon
  (M. Bowes, proprietor)
- 1851–54 : M. Carpier (M. Bowes, proprietor)
- 1855 : MM. Laurencin & Zacheroni (M. Bowes, proprietor)
- 1855 : Hippolyte & Théodore Cogniard
- 1856–69 : Hippolyte Cogniard & Jules Noriac
- 1869–91 : Eugène Bertrand
- 1892–1914 : Fernand Samuel
- 1914–40 : Max Maurey
- 1940–43 : Émile Petit
- 1944–45 : Max Maurey & Émile Petit
- 1946–47 : Max & Denis Maurey
- 1947–75 : Denis & Marcel Maurey
- 1975–89 : Jean-Michel Rouzière
- 1989–91 : Francis Lemonnier
- 1991–2004 : Jean-Paul Belmondo
- since 2005 : Jean-Manuel Bajen
