= Giroflé-Girofla =

Opera composed by Charles Lecocq

1874 illustration for vocal score of Giroflé-Girofla

Giroflé-Girofla is an opéra bouffe in three acts with music by Charles Lecocq. The French libretto was by Albert Vanloo and Eugène Leterrier. The story, set in 13th century Spain, concerns twin brides, one of whom is abducted by pirates. The other twin poses as both brides until the first is rescued. The composer chose an extravagantly far-fetched theme to contrast with his more realistic and romantic success La fille de Madame Angot premiered the previous year.

The opera was first presented at the Théâtre des Fantaisies Parisiennes, Brussels, on 21 March 1874, and was given in London and Paris later the same year; it was soon played in theatres throughout Europe, in the Americas and Australia, and was given many revivals into the early 20th century.

== Background and first performances ==
It took Lecocq many years to achieve recognition as a composer. He had a substantial success in 1868 with Fleur-de-Thé, but it was not until he reached his forties that he gained international fame, with Les cent vierges (1872) and especially La fille de Madame Angot (1873). They both premiered in Brussels – where the composer had moved in 1870 – and were soon staged in theatres across Europe and in the New World. Lecocq said he realised that to have a new success, after Madame Angot, he must compose something in an entirely different style so that no comparison would be possible. He described the far-fetched libretto for Girofle-Girofla as in the Italian buffo style, and just what he wanted. The libretto was the work of two newcomers: Albert Vanloo was a lawyer and Eugène Leterrier a civil servant, both at the start of successful new careers writing for the theatre. They took their title, although nothing else, from a traditional French song "Giroflé-Girofla". (Note: The old song was well known in France and beyond: Tchaikovsky used its tune in the dance "La mère Gigogne et les polichinelles" in The Nutcracker, and Robert Louis Stevenson quotes the words in Travels with a Donkey.)

Pauline Luigini and Mario Widmer, the original Giroflé/Girofla and Marasquin

Eugène Humbert, the director of the Théâtre des Fantaisies-Parisiennes, Brussels, had commissioned Les cent vierges and La fille de Madame Angot; Giroflé-Girofla was the third and last piece Lecocq wrote for him before moving back to Paris, where most of his later works were premiered. Humbert's company included several popular performers who had created roles in La fille de Madame Angot, among them the sopranos Pauline Luigini (Note: Lecocq wrote the leading soprano part with Luigini's voice in mind. She was stronger in the upper register than in the middle and lower, and in consequence the part lies high in the vocal range and was not always easy for her successors to sing.) and Marie Blanche, the tenor Mario Widmer and the buffo baritone Alfred Jolly, all of whom featured in the new production. The theatre was packed to capacity for the premiere, with tickets changing hands for large sums. The piece was received with enthusiasm, encores were "vehemently demanded", according to one critic, and the composer received an ovation at the end.

Managers in Paris remained cautious about staging a new work by Lecocq, despite his two recent big successes. Louis Cantin, director of the Théâtre des Folies-Dramatiques, declined to present the Parisian premiere of Giroflé-Girofla. In the view of the Académie Nationale de l'Opérette this was a blessing for Lecocq and his librettists, because the Théâtre de la Renaissance, which accepted the work, had in its troupe a young recruit of 22 years of age, Jeanne Granier, who had just won her first big success and was on her way to being one of Paris's biggest stars. The production at the Renaissance ran for 220 performances up to the following October. With takings of more than 700,000 francs at the box-office, it was one of Paris's most successful musical productions of the 1870s.

== Original casts ==
Role	Voice type	Brussels, 21 March 1874	Paris, 11 November 1874
Don Boléro d'Alcarazas, a Spanish governor	baritone	Alfred Jolly	Alfred Jolly
Aurore, his wife	mezzo-soprano	Mme Delorme	Mme Alphonsine
Giroflé / Girofla, their twin daughters	soprano	Pauline Luigini	Jeanne Granier
Paquita, in Boléro's service	soprano	Marie Blanche	Augusta Colas
Pedro, in Boléro's service	mezzo-soprano	J d'Alby	Laurent
Marasquin	tenor	Mario Widmer	Félix Puget
Mourzouk, a moor	baritone	Paul Giret	Eugène Vauthier
Pirate chief	bass	Leroy	Gobereau
Godfather		Durieu	Cosmes
Notary		Achille	Fournier
Tax collector		Ernotte	Leclerc
Dancer		Castelain	Paul Albert
Best man		Coclers	Tamarelle
Distant cousins		Laurent, Deschamps, Anna, Schmidt, Thérèse, Piton, Petronille	Panseron, Bied, Albuoy, Anne Muller, Jouvenceau, Gilles, Lebrun, Sylvie
Pirates, Moorish soldiers, sailors, men and women, friends of Giroflé and Girofla, Moorish women

== Synopsis ==
Setting: Spain around 1250

Contemporary drawing of Giroflé-Girofla

=== Act I ===
Don Boléro, governor of the province, is beset by difficulties. The borders of his province are under attack from the sea by marauding pirates and over land by the troops of the moor Mourzouk. He is also short of money, and owes a huge sum to Marasquin Bank. He and his domineering wife Aurore have two identical twin daughters, Giroflé and Girofla (played by the same singer; to distinguish the two characters, she dresses respectively in blue and pink). Aurore has arranged politically advantageous weddings for the twins: Giroflé to the son of Marasquin and Girofla to Mourzouk.

Preparations for the weddings are taking place as the curtain rises, with the bridesmaids in the colours of each bride. Each daughter asks her mother for marital guidance. Pedro, a young man in Boléro's service, warns the girls not to stray too far, or the pirates who roam the coastline will seize them both and take them off to a harem. At the time appointed for the bridegrooms to arrive, Marasquin's son appears promptly, but Mourzouk pleads a toothache and defers his arrival. Young Marasquin declines to wait for the other bridegroom's appearance and insists that his own marriage must go ahead. It is love at first sight for him and Giroflé, and they go off happily together. Now a gang of pirates creep on and seize Girofla. Pedro tries to protect her, but they are bundled onto a ship bound for Constantinople. Boléro and Aurore are appalled and worried about the reaction of the moor. Mourzouk arrives and demands his immediate wedding. Giroflé is told that she must wed a second time, and she dons a pink ribbon.

=== Act II ===
Giroflé is locked in her room while Aurore has to bluff the two husbands – they must wait until midnight to see her. Pedro has escaped from the pirates and enters to say that Boléro's admiral Matamoros has them at bay, but refuses to finish them off until he is paid. Boléro and Aurore leave to plunder the treasury. Meanwhile, Giroflé joins her young cousins to finish off the wedding buffet and they all run off, so that when her parents return they believe that pirates have taken her too. Midnight sounds and there is still no sign of Girofla.

=== Act III ===
Marsasquin and Giroflé appear at breakfast after a pleasing wedding night. Boléro and Aurore reveal the sorry tale to Marasquin and explain that to save them all from the wrath of Mourzouk, Giroflé must impersonate Girofla. They manage to delay Mourzouk again despite his fury, but he is suspicious and swiftly returns to discover the deception by the conniving parents. He insists on behaving as the rightful husband to Giroflé. As arguments rage, Pasquita brings news that the pirates are finally defeated, and Girofla returns – so the weddings can recommence, to general rejoicing.

Source: Gänzl's Book of the Musical Theatre.

== Numbers ==
=== Act I ===
- Chorus – "Que chacun se compose un visage joyeux" (Look happy, everyone)
- Ballade – "Lorsque la journée est finie" (When the day is over – Paquita)
- Couplets – "Pour un tendre père" (For a dear father – Boléro)
- Couplets de Giroflé – "Père adoré, c'est Giroflé" (Beloved Father, it's Giroflé)
- Couplets de Girofla – "Petit papa, c'est Girofla" (Little papa, it's Girofla)
- Couplets de Marasquin – "Mon père est un très-gros banquier" (My father is a very big banker)
- Chorus – "A la chapelle" (At the chapel)
- Couplets de la Présentation – "Ciel! qu'ai-je ressenti là?" (Heavens! What did I feel there? – Marasquin)
- Scène and Chorus – "Mais où donc est mon autre fille" (But where is my other daughter – Aurore)
- Chorus of Pirates – "Parmi les choses délicates" (Among the delicate things)
- Duo – "C'est fini, le mariage" (It's over, the wedding – Marasquin, Giroflé)
- Marche mauresque and entrance of Mourzouk – "Majestueux, et deux par deux" (Majestic, and two by two)
- Couplets – "Ce matin l'on m'a dit: Ma fille" (This morning I was told: My daughter – Boléro)
- Chorus – "Voici l'heure et le moment" (Here is the time and the moment)
- Ensemble – "Comme elle ressemble à sa soeur" (How like her sister she looks)
- Finale – "A la chapelle" (To the chapel)

=== Act II ===
- Entr'acte
- Chorus of guests – "Nous voici, monsieur le beau-père" (Here we are, father-in-law)
- Chorus – "A table, à table, à table" (At the table)
- Duet – "Papa, papa, ça n' peut pas durer comm' ça" (Papa, papa, it cannot go on like this – Giroflé, Boléro)
- Chanson de la Jarretière (Song of the Garter) – "Nos ancêtres étaient sages" (Our ancestors were wise – Marasquin)
- Quintette – "Matamoros, grand capitaine" (Matamoros, great captain – Pedro, Giroflé, Aurore, Boléro, Paquita)
- Morceau d'ensemble – "Bon appétit, belle cousine!" (Bon appétit, fair cousin!)
- Brindisi – "Le punch scintille" (The punch sparkles – Giroflé)
- Finale:
  - Chorus – "Ahl qu'il est bon" (Ah, how good it is)
  - Scène – "Qu'est-ce que cela" (What is that)
  - Andante – "O Giroflé, fleur d'innocence" (O Giroflé, flower of innocence)
  - Ensemble – "Ah! le canon" (Ah! the cannon)

=== Act III ===
- Entr'acte
- Aubade – "Voici le matin" (Here is the morning – Marasquin, Giroflé)
- Duo – "En tête-à-tête, faire la dînette" (We'll dine tête-à-tête – Marasquin, Giroflé)
- Couplets dialogués – "En entrant dans notre chambrette" (Entering our little room – Marasquin, Giroflé)
- Rondeau – "Soyez généreux, soyez magnanime" (Be generous, be magnanimous – Aurore, Boléro, Marasquin, Giroflé)
- Chanson mauresque – "Ma belle Girofla" (My beautiful Girofla – Mourzouk, Giroflé)
- Ensemble – "Au diable l'animal" (To hell with the animal)
- Chorus – "Il est temps de nous mettre en voyage" (It's time to go on a trip)
- Couplets du départ – "Certes dans toute circonstance" (Certainly under any circumstances – Mourzouk, Giroflé, Aurore, Boléro )
- Ensemble – "Je flaire quelque mystère" (I smell some mystery)
- Finale – "Matamoros, grand capitaine" (Matamoros, great captain)

== Revivals ==
Production at the Théâtre de la Gaïté-lyrique

London saw the piece before it opened in Paris, an unusual occurrence much remarked on in the press. Richard D'Oyly Carte engaged Humbert's Brussels company to play Giroflé-Girofla in French at the Opera Comique, London, where it opened on 6 June 1874, starring all the creators of the principal roles. It played to packed houses and received enthusiastic reviews. The first production in English was at the Philharmonic Theatre, Islington, London, with a libretto adapted by Clement O'Neil and Campbell Clarke, which opened on 3 October 1874 with Julia Matthews, Walter Fisher and Harriet Everard. The work was presented in London three more times during the 19th century: in English, starring Pauline Rita (1875), and in French by the returning Belgian company (1875), and a Parisian company led by Granier, Jolly and Vauthier (1881).

The American premiere was at the Park Theatre, New York, on 4 February 1875. Kurt Gänzl and Andrew Lamb list eight subsequent productions in New York between then and the turn of the century, and two later: at the Broadway Theatre in 1905 and Jolson's Theatre in 1926. The opera was a favourite of the soprano Lillian Russell who played the dual lead role in Chicago, New York and on tour in the 1890s.

In Paris, revivals in the 19th century included one in 1880 starring Granier and another in 1889 with Clara Lardinois. Further revivals were staged in 1903 and 1911. The opera was presented in Berlin in 1874. The Australian premiere was given in Melbourne in May 1875, starring Clara Thompson and Henry Bracy, and in the same year productions opened in Buenos Aires, Prague, Vienna and Budapest.

Lillian Russell in the title role, 1890s

The work has been infrequently revived since the early 20th century. A centenary production was staged in London by students of the Central School of Speech & Drama in March 1974. Professional revivals have been presented at the Odéon Theatre, Marseille in 2007, and the Grand Théâtre, Angers, in 2016.

An abridged version was recorded by soloists, the orchestra and chorus of Radio Berlin under Willi Lachner in 1952, for Urania, with Kurt Pratsch-Kaufmann as Don Boléro d'Alcarazas. A complete French radio performance from November 1963 conducted by Marcel Cariven was published on CD in 1991 by Gaieté Lyrique.

== Critical reception ==
After the Brussels premiere the reviews were highly favourable. The critic in The Standard wrote that the music was of very high quality, superior to that of La fille de Madame Angot, and proved that Lecocq was a composer of the first order. In the view of The Athenaeum, the work transcended the genre of ordinary buffa opera, and was true comic opera comparable with works by Rossini and Cimarosa, as satisfying to the academic as to the public. The paper's critic found the libretto less satisfying, the second and third acts being too similar in plot. A review in The New York Times predicted that the pirates' chorus, "Parmi les choses délicates", would "soon be repeated by all the organ-grinders throughout the civilized world". The critic concurred with The Athenaeum's view that Giroflé-Girofla was "not an operetta, but a real opera comique", and predicted a place in the Académie des Beaux-Arts for the composer.

After the piece opened in Paris, Les Annales du théâtre et de la musique observed that everybody was laughing at "this joyous buffoonery" and humming the music of "this charming score".

Reviewing the centenary production in London in 1974, Stanley Sadie found the piece "charming … not very original or very sharp by comparison with Offenbach, but with plenty of witty harmonic touches and elegantly shaped melodic lines, and with a little more sparkle than Sullivan. In his survey of operetta (2003), Richard Traubner praises Lecocq's "fertile" and "formidable" invention, especially in ensembles such as the Act I sextet "Comme elle ressemble à sa soeur" and the Act II quintet "Matamoros, grand capitaine". He remarks that the libretto may have been an influence on W. S. Gilbert, as regards both plot and characters.

== Notes, references and sources ==
=== Sources ===
- Fields, Armond (2008). Lillian Russell: A Biography of 'America's Beauty'. Jefferson: Mcfarland. ISBN 978-0-7864-3868-6.
- Gänzl, Kurt; Andrew Lamb (1988). Gänzl's Book of the Musical Theatre. London: The Bodley Head. OCLC 966051934.
- Loewenberg, Alfred (1943). Annals of Opera. Cambridge: Heffer. OCLC 253716011.
- Stevenson, Robert Louis (1928) [1879]. Travels with a Donkey in the Cevennes. London: Collins. OCLC 223388599.
- Stoullig, Edmond; Édouard Noël (1876). Les Annales du Théâtre et de la Musique, 1875. Paris: Charpentier. OCLC 150445131.
- Traubner, Richard (2016). Operetta: A Theatrical History. London: Routledge. ISBN 978-1-138-13892-6.
- Widor, Charles-Marie (1883). Vieilles chansons pour les petits enfants. Paris: E. Plon, Nourrit et cie. OCLC 842449875.
- Wiley, Roland John (1991). Tchaikovsky's Ballets: Swan Lake, Sleeping Beauty, Nutcracker. Oxford: Clarendon Press. ISBN 978-0-19-315314-1.
