= Charles Lecocq =

French composer (1832–1918)

Lecocq in 1874

Alexandre Charles Lecocq (French pronunciation: [alɛksɑ̃dʁ ʃaʁl ləkɔk]; 3 June 1832 – 24 October 1918) was a French composer, known for his opérettes and opéras comiques. He became the most prominent successor to Jacques Offenbach in this sphere, and enjoyed considerable success in the 1870s and early 1880s, before the changing musical fashions of the late 19th century made his style of composition less popular. His few serious works include the opera Plutus (1886), which was not a success, and the ballet Le Cygne (1899). His only piece to survive in the regular modern operatic repertory is his 1872 opéra comique La Fille de Madame Angot (Mme Angot's Daughter). Others of his more than forty stage works receive occasional revivals.

After study at the Paris Conservatoire, Lecocq shared the first prize with Georges Bizet in an operetta-writing contest organised in 1856 by Offenbach. Lecocq's next successful composition was an opéra-bouffe, Fleur-de-Thé (Tea-flower), twelve years later. His comic operas Les Cent Vierges (The Hundred Virgins, 1872), La Fille de Madame Angot (1872) and Giroflé-Girofla (1874) were all successes and established his international reputation. Critics remarked on the elegance of the music in Lecocq's best works. His other popular pieces in the 1870s included La Petite Mariée (The Little Bride, 1875) and Le Petit Duc (The Little Duke, 1878). Although a few of his works in the early 1880s were well-received, and he continued composing for more than two decades afterwards, his later works never achieved the same admiration.

== Life and career ==
=== Early years ===
Lecocq was born in Paris, the son of a copyist at the Commercial Court of the Seine. His father was not highly paid, but supported a family of five children. As a boy Lecocq suffered from a hip condition that obliged him to use crutches throughout his life. (Note: Some sources attribute the condition to a childhood illness; Kurt Gänzl ascribes it to a childhood injury.) His first musical instrument was the flageolet; a music teacher, discerning his talent, persuaded his parents to buy a piano. By the age of 16 Lecocq was giving private piano lessons which funded the lessons he himself was taking in harmony.

He was admitted into the Paris Conservatoire in 1849, studying harmony under François Bazin, organ with François Benoist and composition with Fromental Halévy. Among his classmates were Georges Bizet and Camille Saint-Saëns; the latter became his lifelong friend. At the end of his second year he gained the second prize in counterpoint and was premier accessit in Benoist's organ class. (Note: That is, winner of the third prize, after the runner-up (second prix) and the winner (premier prix).) He thought little of Halévy as a teacher, and was not inspired to pursue the top musical prize, the Prix de Rome. He would not, in the event, have been able to do so, because in 1854 he had to leave the Conservatoire prematurely to help support his parents, by giving lessons and playing for dance classes.

=== First success ===
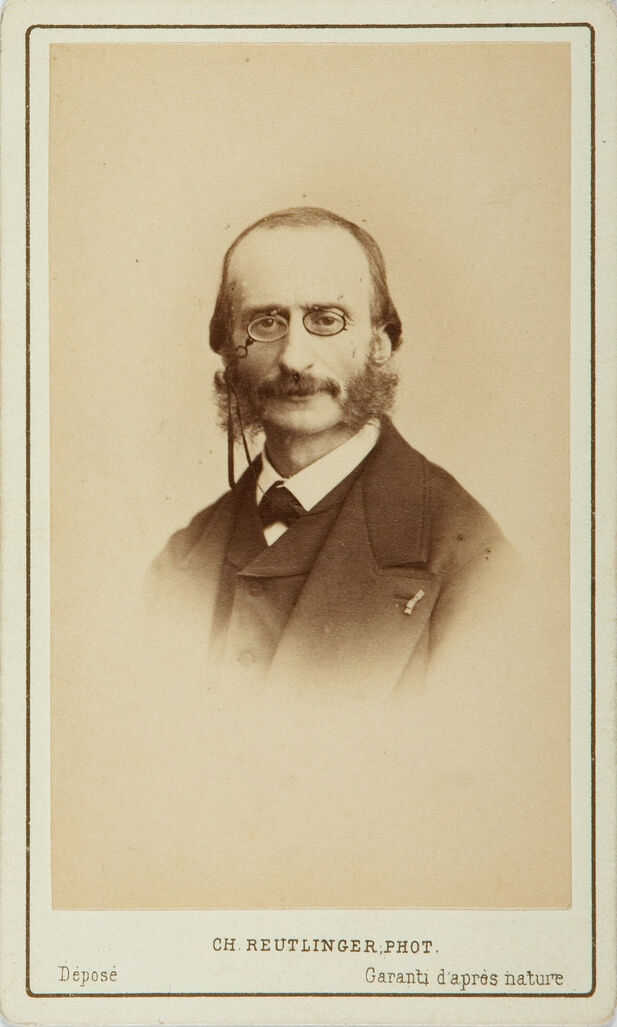
Jacques Offenbach

At the time when Lecocq left the Conservatoire, the genre of popular musical theatre known as opérette was becoming popular. It had been introduced by the composer Hervé and its principal exponent was Jacques Offenbach, who presented his works at the Théâtre des Bouffes-Parisiens from 1855. In 1856 he organised an open competition for aspiring composers. A jury of French composers and playwrights including Daniel Auber, Halévy, Ambroise Thomas, Charles Gounod and Eugène Scribe considered 78 entries; the five short-listed entrants were all asked to set a libretto, Le Docteur Miracle, written by Ludovic Halévy and Léon Battu. The joint winners were Bizet and Lecocq. (Note: Lecocq believed that he should have won the competition outright, but that Halévy influenced the other jurors in Bizet's favour.) Richard Traubner comments in his history of operetta that Bizet's version has survived better than Lecocq's, which is forgotten. Bizet became, and remained, a friend of Offenbach; Lecocq and Offenbach took a dislike to one another, and their rivalry in later years was not altogether friendly. Lecocq's setting of Le Docteur Miracle, was given eleven performances at Offenbach's theatre, but this early success was followed by eleven years of obscurity and routine work as a teacher, accompanist and répétiteur.

Between 1859 and 1866, Lecocq wrote six one-act works, which were presented at the Folies-Nouvelles, the Théâtre des Folies-Marigny, the Théâtre du Palais-Royal and elsewhere, without making any great impression. The composer's fortunes improved when he was engaged by Fromental Halévy's nephew William Busnach at the Théâtre de l'Athénée, for which Lecocq wrote the music for his first two-act piece, an opéra-bouffe called L'Amour et Son Carquois (Cupid and His Quiver) presented in January 1868. In April of that year he had his first substantial success with Fleur-de-Thé (Tea-flower) a three-act bouffe playing on the fashionable interest in the Far East. The piece was successfully given in London and New York in 1871.

=== 1870s ===
The Franco-Prussian War in 1870–1871 temporarily interrupted Lecocq's rise, and he was gloomy about his prospects after it. In the longer term the war worked to his advantage, as it brought about the fall of the Second Empire, with which Offenbach had been closely identified in the popular mind, and in the aftermath of France's crushing defeat by Prussia, Offenbach's German birth made him unpopular in some quarters. While Offenbach struggled to re-establish himself in Parisian theatres, Lecocq began to occupy his place.

Scene from La Fille de Madame Angot, Paris, 1873

After the outbreak of the war Lecocq moved temporarily to Brussels, where he premiered Les Cent Vierges (The Hundred Virgins, 1872), (Note: The piece appears to have been first given as "L'isle verte; ou Les cent vierges".) La Fille de Madame Angot (Madame Angot's Daughter, 1872) and Giroflé-Girofla (1874), all great successes there and then in Paris and elsewhere. La Fille de Madame Angot was most conspicuous of these successes. At the Parisian premiere in February 1873, Saint-Saëns said, "It's much more serious than you think; it's a success without parallel!" On the first night in Paris every number was encored. The work ran for 411 performances in Paris and was given in 103 cities and towns in France, and theatres in other countries: its London premiere was within three months of the first Paris performances. In 1874 the London paper The Morning Post commented that twelve months earlier scarcely anyone in England had heard of Lecocq, but now it was doubtful if there was anyone "who has not played sung or whistled one or more of Lecocq's charming melodies". So great was the composer's popularity as a composer of operétte that he felt obliged to use a pen-name ("Georges Stern") for his serious music such as his Miettes musicales, Op. 21 (Musical Crumbs).

The 1870s were Lecocq's most fruitful decade. Sheet-music sales of arrangements from his operettas sold prodigiously. Settling once again in Paris, he formed a productive partnership with Victor Koning, co-librettist of La Fille de Madame Angot and now the proprietor of the Théâtre de la Renaissance. Lecocq consolidated his reputation as a composer of comic opera with two more long-running pieces, La Petite Mariée (The Little Bride, 1875) and Le Petit Duc (The Little Duke, 1878); they have remained in the French, though not the international, operetta repertory. For Le Petit Duc he worked with Offenbach's favoured librettists, Henri Meilhac and Ludovic Halévy, which, in Traubner's words, "left no doubt that the composer had succeeded Offenbach". Nonetheless, by this time Offenbach had recovered much of his pre-war popularity with Parisian audiences, and Lecocq's pre-eminence was briefly threatened by the older composer's successful Madame Favart (1878) and La Fille du tambour-major (1879), but the latter was Offenbach's last completed work and he died in 1880.

=== Later years ===
Le Cœur et la Main, one of Lecocq's successes in the 1880s

At the turn of the decade Lecocq had a year's break from composition as a result of illness and domestic problems. He returned with the opéra comique Janot (1881), which was a failure. Lecocq had Meilhac and Halévy as his librettists, but all three collaborators were hampered by Koning's insistence on a plot revolving around his star singer, Jeanne Granier, in a breeches role as a wandering minstrel boy, a hackneyed device which audiences regarded as a cliché. The failure led to the break-up of Lecocq's association with Koning and the Renaissance. He transferred his allegiance to the Théâtre des Nouveautés where five of his next operas were staged. His choice caused some surprise, as the theatre, run by the actor-manager Jules Brasseur, had no reputation for opérette or opéra-bouffe, and was distinguished by the sometimes indelicate content of its productions. The most successful of Lecocq's works for the Nouveautés were the opéra bouffe Le Jour et la Nuit (Day and Night, 1881) and the opéra comique Le Cœur et la Main (The Heart and the Hand, 1882), both variations on his familiar theme of wedding nights disrupted by farcical complications. In Grove's Dictionary of Music and Musicians, Andrew Lamb describes these as Lecocq's last real successes.

Unlike his predecessor, Offenbach, and his successor, André Messager, Lecocq could not, or would not, alter his style to meet changing public tastes. Lamb writes that he accepted that fashion in comic opera had changed, and he turned to other genres. In 1886, his opera, Plutus, a "morality" based on a play by Aristophanes, was presented at the Opéra-Comique. After the premiere the Paris correspondent of The Era called it "the most unsuccessful and insignificant of his works … utterly devoid of originality, altogether wanting in inspiration, and without a genuine sparkle from end to end". The run closed after eight performances.

In 1899, Lecocq composed a ballet, Le Cygne, for the Opéra-Comique, to a scenario by Catulle Mendès. His last important operetta, in Lamb's view, was the three-act opéra comique La Belle au bois dormant (Sleeping Beauty, 1900); after which he wrote one more full-length work (Yetta, 1903) for Brussels and four short pieces for Paris.

Lecocq was appointed a Chevalier of the Légion d'honneur in 1900 and promoted to Officier in 1910. He died in his home city of Paris, aged 85.

== Works ==
In a 2017 study, Laurence Senelick comments that whereas Offenbach's operas are frequently revived, Lecocq's are "the stuff of occasional antiquarian revivals" ... "sporadic productions of curiosity value". (Note: In this regard, Senelick groups Lecocq with Hervé, Planquette and "even Chabrier".) For the eight seasons from 2012 to 2020, the international Operabase archive records ten staged or planned productions of four pieces by Lecocq: six productions of La Fille de Madame Angot, two of the 1887 three-act opéra comique Ali-Baba and one each of Le Docteur Miracle and Le Petit Duc. For the same period, Operabase records more than five hundred productions of nearly forty different operas by Offenbach.

Giroflé-Girofla, 1874

Several writers have discussed why Lecocq's music is neglected. In 1911 an anonymous critic in The Observer wrote, "Lecocq succeeded in being a formidable rival to Offenbach. As a composer he was one of the happiest of melodists, but never attained the heights of fascinating vulgarity and bustling originality of his more famous contemporary". Lamb writes that much of Lecocq's music is characterised by a light touch, although "he could also adopt a more lyrical and elevated style than Offenbach". Traubner comments that Lecocq consciously sought to elevate comic opera from the satirical and zany opéra-bouffe of his predecessors to the supposedly loftier genre of opéra-comique. (Note: There is no universally agreed dividing line between opéra comique and opérette; a 2003 study of opera suggests that the latter is essentially frivolous, and the former, though often (but not always) humorous, also has some element of genuine human interest and is seen as of loftier artistic intent. Others disagree that opérette is "essentially" frivolous.) Florian Bruyas in his Histoire de l'opérette en France makes a similar point. When Giroflé-Girofla opened at the Théâtre de la Renaissance in 1874, the reviewer in the Chronique Musicale wrote that the music seemed to him superior to that of Offenbach – or even of earlier pieces by Lecocq, including La Fille de Madame Angot – but that it was composed in a style that was possibly too refined to appeal to operetta audiences. This style came into its own in the 1870s and 1880s, but went out of fashion before the turn of the century.

In a 2015 study, Robert Letellier divides the genre of opérette by chronology and type, with the "imperial" operetta of Offenbach followed by the "bourgeois" operetta of Lecocq, which was superseded by the "Belle Epoque" of Messager. Like the Observer reviewer, he remarks on the elegance of Lecocq's best music. He also criticises Lecocq for abusing his compositional talent, particularly in his early works, by setting libretti of little merit. This, in Letellier's view, led to the oblivion of much excellent music, lost when works with bad libretti failed. Traubner observes that many critics rate Lecocq higher than Offenbach as an orchestrator and harmonist, although melodically he did not rival the "startling immediacy" of Offenbach's tunes. Lecocq disliked being compared to Offenbach, and went out of his way to avoid rhythmic devices familiar from the older composer's works. Kurt Gänzl's study of the composer concludes:

His work did not in any way lack comical strains, but his musical turn of phrase in comic situations was always more genteel than the cheerfully vulgar and belly-laugh burlesque effects of such musicians as Hervé. It is perhaps this lack of very obvious colouring that has led to his works being disproportionately neglected in modern times where only La Fille de Madame Angot and, to a lesser extent, Le petit duc remain in the repertoire in France.

As well as his works for the stage, Lecocq composed around a hundred songs, including some set to fables by La Fontaine and a set of twenty 'Les chansons d'amour', and four volumes of piano pieces (including mazurkas dedicated to Bizet).

== Notes, references and sources ==
=== Sources ===
- Almeida, Antonio de (1976). Offenbach's songs from the great operettas. New York: Dover Publications. ISBN 978-0-486-23341-3.
- Bruyas, Florian (1974). Histoire de l'opérette en France, 1855–1965 (in French). Lyon: Emanuel Vitte. OCLC 1217747.
- Gammond, Peter (1980). Offenbach. London: Omnibus Press. ISBN 978-0-7119-0257-2.
- Grout, Donald Jay; Hermine Weigel Williams (2003). A Short History of Opera. New York: Columbia University Press. ISBN 978-0-231-11958-0.
- Harding, James (1980). Jacques Offenbach: A Biography. London: John Calder. ISBN 978-0-7145-3835-8.
- Letellier, Robert (2015). Operetta: A Sourcebook. Volume I. Newcastle: Cambridge Scholars Publishing. ISBN 978-1-4438-6690-3.
- Senelick, Laurence (2017). Jacques Offenbach and the Making of Modern Culture. Cambridge: Cambridge University Press. ISBN 978-0-521-87180-8.
- Traubner, Richard (2016). Operetta: A Theatrical History. London: Routledge. ISBN 978-1-138-13892-6.
