= Théâtre de la Renaissance =

Theatre in Paris, France

Coordinates: 48°52′8.5″N 2°21′23″E

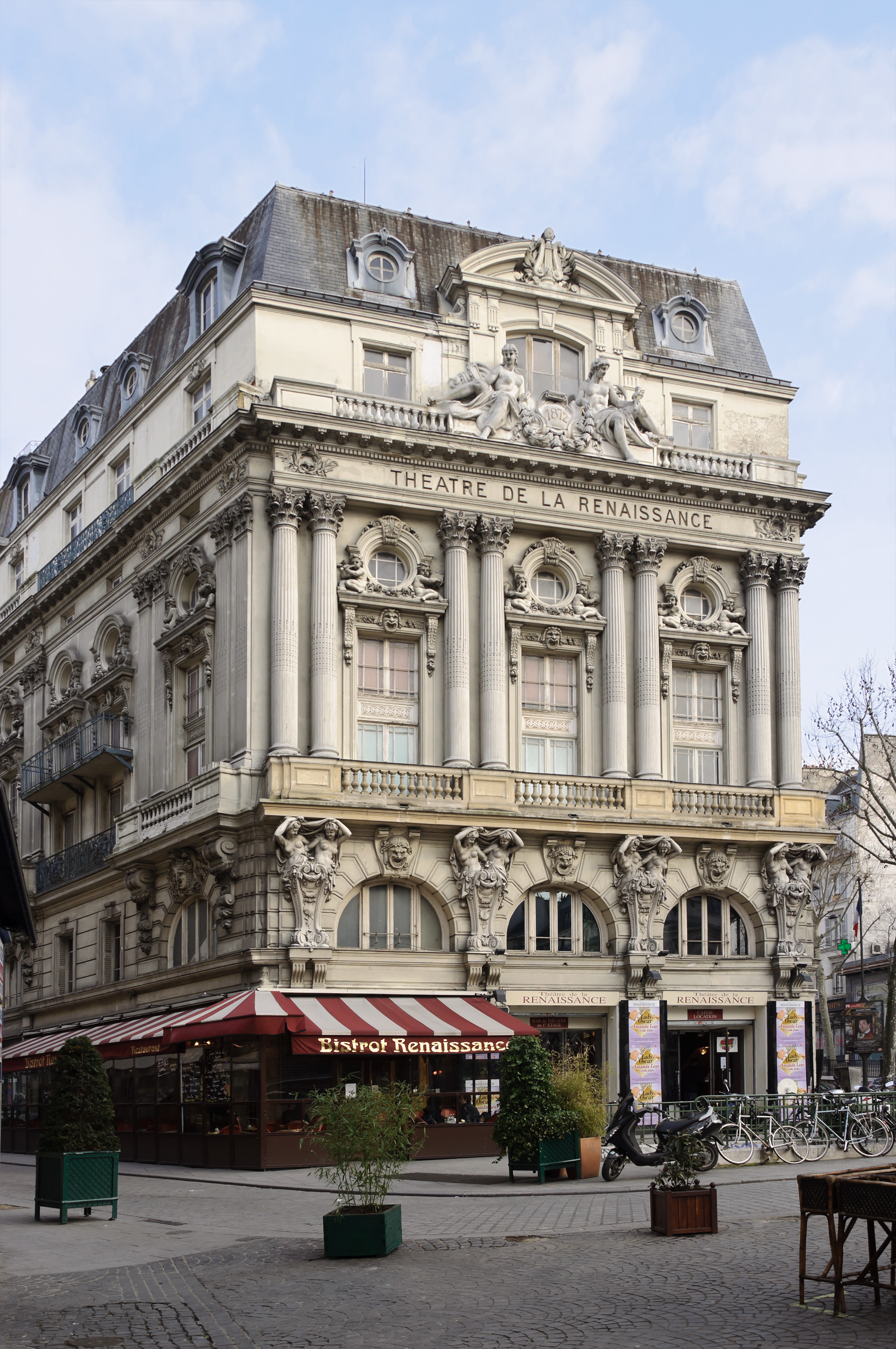
Théâtre de la Renaissance

The name Théâtre de la Renaissance (French pronunciation: [teɑtʁ də la ʁənɛsɑ̃s]) has been used successively for three distinct Parisian theatre companies. The first two companies, which were short-lived enterprises in the 19th century, used the Salle Ventadour, now an office building on the Rue Méhul in the 2nd arrondissement.

The current company was founded in 1873, and its much smaller theatre (pictured) was built that same year next to the Porte Saint-Martin at 20 boulevard Saint-Martin, in the 10th arrondissement. Besides performances of musical theatre, Feydeau's farces were first produced in this theatre, and plays by Victorien Sardou. Among the actors who triumphed there were Sarah Bernhardt, Eleonora Duse, and Raimu, later Agnès Jaoui and Jean-Pierre Bacri.

== 1838–1841 ==
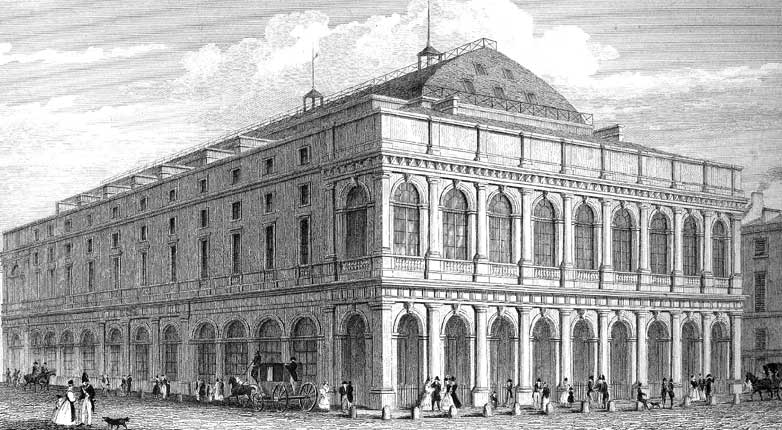
Salle Ventadour

The first company to be called Théâtre de la Renaissance opened its doors in 1838 under the sponsorship of Victor Hugo and Alexandre Dumas, père, who wanted to have a location for mounting their historical dramas. The Salle Ventadour (built in 1829 for the Opéra-Comique) was used.

On 8 November 1838, Hugo's Ruy Blas starring Frédérick Lemaître had a triumphant premiere, and the French version of Donizetti's Lucia di Lammermoor retitled and reworked as Lucie de Lammermoor was produced there in August 1839. His L'ange de Nisida, which was later reworked into La favorite, was commissioned by the company, although never performed due to bankruptcy. In April 1839, L'Alchimiste and Paul Jones by Alexandre Dumas (also with Frédérick Lemaître) were staged, but, due to theatrical intrigues, the theatre was forced to close in 1841.

== The Carvalho company ==
In 1868, Carvalho (director of the Théâtre Lyrique) obtained the rights to stage operatic works at the Ventadour, focusing mainly on more elaborate works from the Théâtre Lyrique's repertory, with Adolphe Deloffre as chief conductor. The season opened with Faust and included other works by Gounod and Clapisson. The company was short-lived, lasting from 16 March 1868 to 5 May 1868.

== 1873 to the present ==
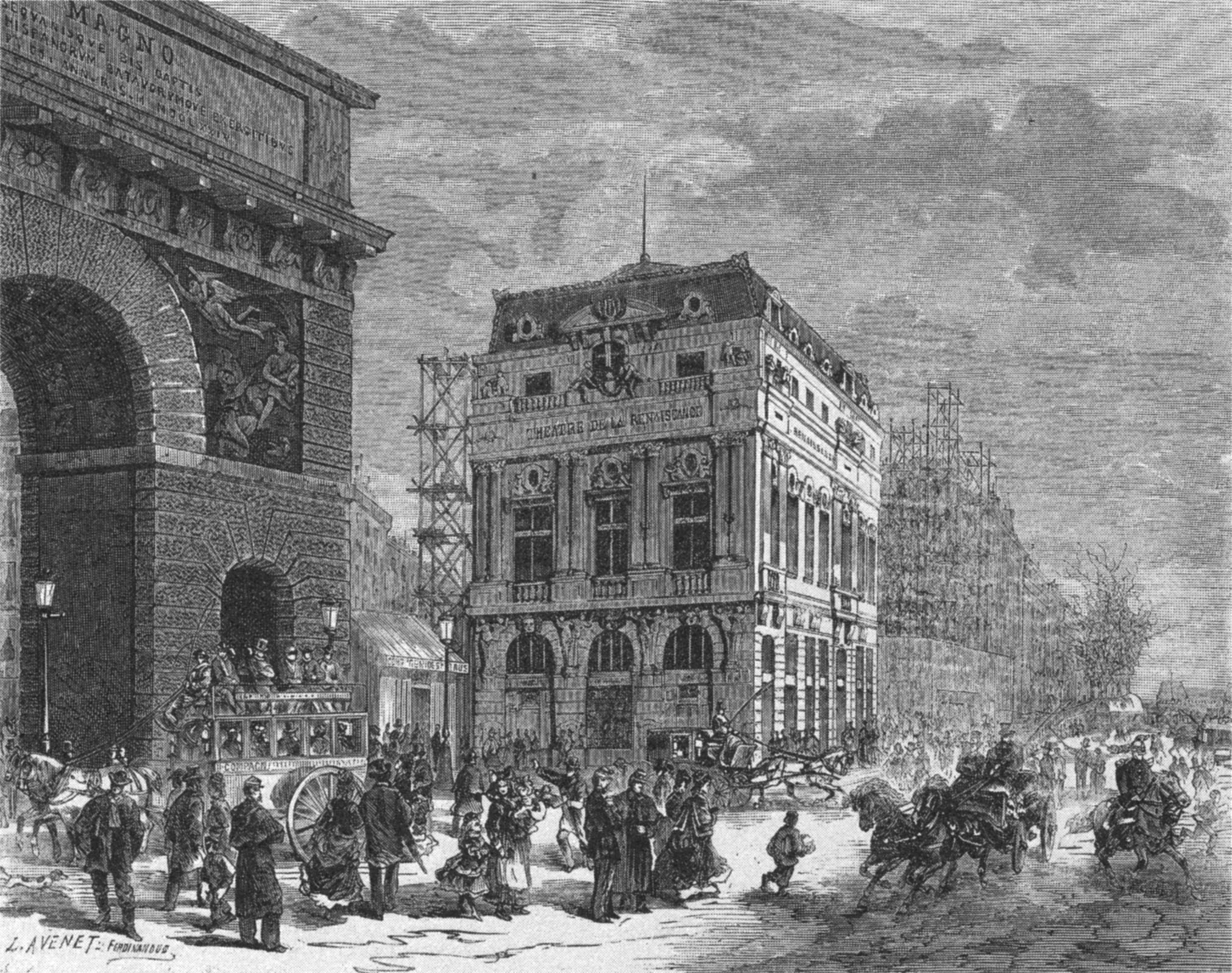
Théâtre de la Renaissance (ca. 1873), with the Porte Saint-Martin to the left

The architect Charles de Lalande designed a new 'théâtre à l'italienne' on the site of the Deffieux restaurant. The inauguration took place on 8 March 1873 with La Femme de feu by Adolphe Belot. Hippolyte Hostein directed the theatre until December 1875. Thérèse Raquin (after the novel by Émile Zola) was premiered in July 1873, Giroflé-Girofla and La petite mariée, opéras-bouffes by Charles Lecocq in 1874 and 1875.

Victor Koning succeeded Hostein from December 1875 until 1882, and opéras-bouffes and opéras-comiques featured strongly : in 1877 La Marjolaine by Charles Lecocq, Le Tzigane by Johann Strauss, in 1878 Le petit duc by Lecocq, in 1879 La Petite Mademoiselle by Lecocq and in 1880 Belle Lurette by Jacques Offenbach.

From 1882 to 1893 the theatre lacked direction although the period saw the creation of Fanfreluche, an opéra-comique by Gaston Serpette in 1883, La Parisienne and La Navette by Henry Becque in 1885, Tailleur pour dames by Feydeau in 1886, Isoline by André Messager in 1888, and Madame Chrysanthème also by Messager in 1893.

Sarah Bernhardt took over the direction from 1893 to 1899, during which time Gismonda by Victorien Sardou in 1894, La Princesse Lointaine by Edmond Rostand in 1895, Les Amants by Maurice Donnay and La Figurante by François Curel in 1896, La Ville morte by Gabriele d'Annunzio, L'Affranchie by Maurice Donnay, Le Radeau de la Méduse by Romain Coolus in 1898, were all premiered. On 3 December 1896, Bernhardt created herself Lorenzaccio by Musset and the following year La Samaritaine by Edmond Rostand.

The Milliaud brothers ran the theatre from 1899, followed by Firmin Gémier in 1901, until the arrival of Lucien Guitry from October 1902 until 1909. The actor Albert Tarride then directed the théâtre, then Cora Laparcerie took over in 1913, with Marcel Paston from 1928 to 1933.

In 1942, while the theatre was threatened with destruction, Henri Varna acquired the building and Jean Darcante put on shows.

In Octobre 1956 the actress Véra Korène of the Comédie-Française became director of a theatre restored in the style of the Second Empire. 23 September 1959 saw the creation of Les Séquestrés d'Altona by Jean-Paul Sartre with Serge Reggiani. 1960 saw L'Etouffe-Chrétien by Félicien Marceau with Arletty, with Louisiane by Marcel Aymé in 1961, Qui a peur de Virginia Woolf ? in 1962 and Douce-Amère, first play by Jean Poiret in 1970.

In 1978 there was a season of opérettes, and from 1981 to 1988 Michèle Lavalard led the théâtre succeeded by Niels Arestrup. In 1990 La Cuisse du Steward by Jean-Michel Ribes was premiered, and in 1994 Un Air de Famille by Agnès Jaoui and Jean-Pierre Bacri.

Under Christian Spillemaecker and Bruno Moynot, the theatre staged comic plays and shows with success.

The current capacity is 650 seats.
