= Novello (surname) =

Novello is a surname of Italian origin. Notable people with the surname include:

- Agostino Novello (1240–1309), Italian religious figure
- Alfred Novello (1810–1896), English music publisher, son of Vincent Novello
- Antonia Novello (born 1944), Puerto Rican physician
- Charles Novello (1886–1935), American lawyer and politician
- Clara Novello (1818–1908), British singer, daughter of Vincent Novello
- Don Novello (born 1943), American actor and comedian
- Ivor Novello (1893–1951), Welsh singer, composer and entertainer, son of Clara Novello Davies
- Jay Novello (1904–1982), American actor
- Marie Novello (1898–1928), Welsh pianist, adopted daughter of Clara Novello Davies
- Mary Novello (1809–1898), English author, daughter of Vincent Novello
- Vincent Novello (1781–1861), English musician

== See also ==
- Novello (disambiguation)
- Novelli (surname)
