= Cowden Clarke =

Cowden Clarke is a surname. Notable people with the surname include:

- Charles Cowden Clarke (1787–1877), English author
- Mary Cowden Clarke (1809–1898), English author
