= The Musical World =

British music journal (1836–91)

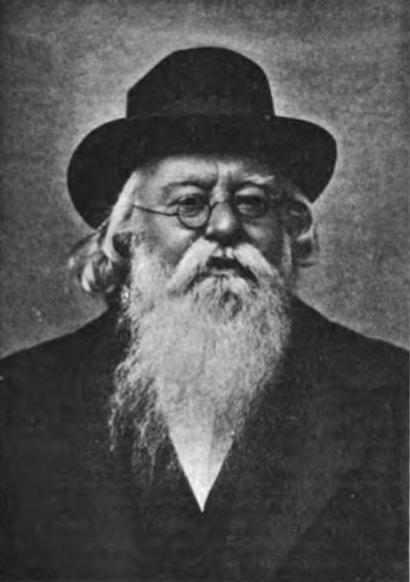
Alfred Novello, the journal's founder and original publisher

The Musical World (formerly The Musical World; a Weekly Record of Musical Science, Literature, and Intelligence) was an English music journal founded and published weekly by Alfred Novello during the Victorian era. The journal was predominantly music related but also included general interest items. It was Novello's first published journal and the first weekly music journal in England. It ran from 18 March 1836 to 24 January 1891, with a total of 71 volumes published over its lifetime. The journal was available for 4d (20s for annual subscription) and usually had 16 pages. It predates comparable publications like Novello's later published The Musical Times. James William Davison became owner and editor of the journal in 1844 until his death the year after. In 1888, the journal was purchased by Edgar Frederick Jacques, who became editor.

== Editors ==
- Charles Cowden Clarke (1836 – c. 1838)
- Edward Holmes (c. 1838 – 1839)
- George Macfarren (1839–1844)
- James William Davison (1844–1885)
- Francis Hueffer (1886–1888)
- Edgar Frederick Jacques (1888–1891)
