= Novelli =

Novelli is an Italian surname. Notable people with the surname include:

- Amleto Novelli (1885–1924), Italian film actor
- Augusto Novelli (1867–1927), Italian cartoonist
- Bill Novelli (born 1941), American businessman
- Catherine A. Novelli (born 1947), American diplomat
- Ermete Novelli (1851–1919), Italian actor
- Gastone Novelli (1895–1919), World War I flying ace
- Giulia Novelli (1858–1932), Italian operatic mezzo-soprano
- Giuseppe Novelli (born 1959), Italian biologist and academic
- Hervé Novelli (born 1939), French politician
- James Novelli (1885–1940), Italian-American sculptor
- Jean-Christophe Novelli (born 1961), French chef
- Luca Novelli (1857–1905), Italian cartoonist and writer
- Mario Novelli (1913–1964), Italian basketball player
- Novello Novelli (1930–2018), Italian actor
- Pietro Novelli (1603–1647), Italian painter and architect

== See also ==
- Porter Novelli, an American public relations firm
- Novello (surname)
