= Hugh Enes Blackmore =

British singer and actor (1863–1945)

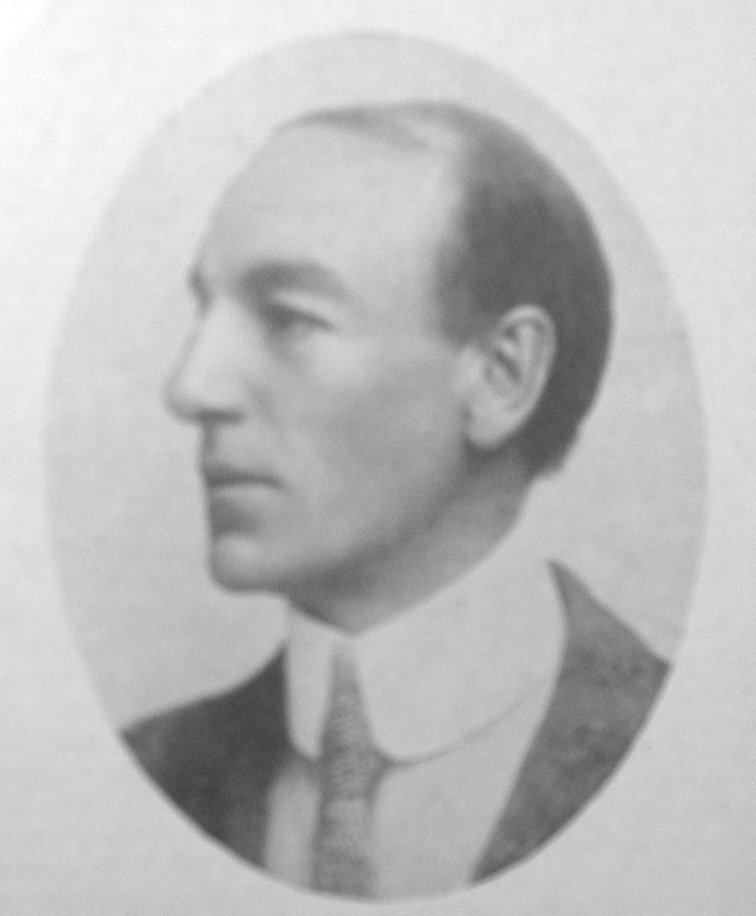
Hugh Enes Blackmore

Hugh Enes Blackmore (1 October 1863 – 21 May 1945) was a British opera and concert singer and actor. Known as the "Iron-Throated Tenor", he is best remembered for his performances of tenor roles with the D'Oyly Carte Opera Company. His career with D'Oyly Carte spanned almost 30 years, ending with a season as the company's stage manager. He was later a teacher of operatic singing and acting.

== Early life and career ==
Blackmore was born in Greenock in Scotland, the second of four children born to Elizabeth Mary née Collier (1834–1922) and Edward Blackmore (1824–1900), a marine engineer. He attended Fettes College in Edinburgh, where he sang tenor solos beginning at age 14. Encouraged by Alexander Potts, his headmaster, Blackmore took singing lessons and hoped to make a career in opera by training in Italy. Blackmore's father, however, wanted him to follow a more secure profession, so he trained as a solicitor in Cardiff. Finding this career not to his liking, he gave up law and studied singing under Signor Caravoglia.

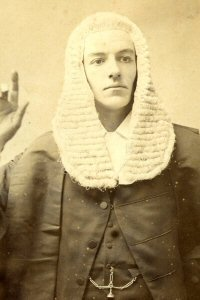
Blackmore as Sir Bailey Barre in Utopia, Limited, 1893

In the early 1890s, Blackmore sang in a variety of concerts with performers including Leonora Braham and W. H. Squire. He took part in an evening concert at Kensington Town Hall on 22 March 1893 in aid of the fund for building a church at the Pembroke College, Cambridge mission in Walworth. The concert, which included Schubert's incidental music from Rosamunde, receiving its "First performance in England in its original and complete form", was held under the patronage of the Master and fellows of Pembroke College, with a young Henry Wood conducting.

Blackmore's association with the D'Oyly Carte Opera Company spanned almost 30 years. In October 1893, he created the small role of Sir Bailey Barre, one of the 'Flowers of Progress', in Gilbert and Sullivan's Utopia, Limited at the Savoy Theatre in London. From 1894–96 he performed with a D'Oyly Carte touring company, playing Captain Fitzbattleaxe in Utopia, Ralph Rackstraw in H.M.S. Pinafore, Picorin in Mirette, Vasquez in The Chieftain, the Duke of Dunstable in Patience, Marco in The Gondoliers, Nanki-Poo in The Mikado and Ernest Dummkopf in the first British provincial production of The Grand Duke.

At the end of 1896, Blackmore left the D'Oyly Carte Opera Company. He toured for more than a year in a new musical comedy, The Ballet Girl, by James T. Tanner and Adrian Ross, playing the role of Reuben Van Eyt. He then appeared in London in 1898 and 1899 as Piccolo in Edward Jakobowski and Ross's musical comedy Milord Sir Smith at the Comedy Theatre. After this, he played Vincent in a tour of Ma mie Rosette, a "romantic comedy-opera" with music by Paul Lacome and Ivan Caryll. During this period, Blackmore sang at the Steinway Hall in London on 2 November 1898 during the first season of the Elderhorst Chamber Concerts. In 1906 he and his wife toured South Africa with a D'Oyly Carte touring company.

=== Later career ===
In 1908, Blackmore rejoined the D'Oyly Carte Opera Company at the Savoy Theatre for the company's second London repertory season, as a member of the chorus. He played Griffin David in several performances of A Welsh Sunset, which was a curtain-raiser for Pinafore that season. Later that year, Blackmore resumed touring with D'Oyly Carte, taking on the small roles of Leonard Meryll in The Yeomen of the Guard and Francesco in The Gondoliers, as well as singing in the chorus of the other shows on tour. In 1910, he gave up playing the character of Francesco but continued to play Leonard until July, after which date he played only chorus roles for the next two years. During D'Oyly Carte's 1912–13 season, he began to play the small role of First Yeoman in Yeomen. In July 1913 he added Annibale in The Gondoliers to his repertoire, stepping up to the more important role of Luiz for a short period in 1914. He also substituted at times in leading tenor roles, including Tolloller in Iolanthe (1914–15), Nanki-Poo in The Mikado (1917), Marco in The Gondoliers (1917), and Alexis in The Sorcerer (1918). He also played the role of Cyril in Princess Ida in 1918. Blackmore returned to the D'Oyly Carte chorus in 1918, also playing the roles of Leonard in Yeomen and Annibale in The Gondoliers from July 1919. From 1921, his only principal role was Annibale, but he occasionally filled in for Derek Oldham as Tolloller in Iolanthe, before retiring from the stage in April 1922.

Blackmore was then employed by D'Oyly Carte to coach the Company's professional understudies in their roles. He was appointed as D'Oyly Carte's stage manager for the 1922–23 season, but, coming into "uncomfortable conflict with the artistic temperament", he was replaced the following season by Frederick Hobbs. After leaving the stage, Blackmore taught voice and coached actors in 'operatic stage craft' in the London-based 'G & S School of Opera', which he founded with his wife, describing himself in advertisements for the School as the 'principal tenor and SM' with D'Oyly Carte.

=== Personal life ===
"Blackie", as he was known to friends and colleagues, married fellow D'Oyly Carter Theresa Mary Hewett "Tessa" Snelson (1870–1939) in 1902; they were introduced to each other on the stage of the Savoy Theatre by W. S. Gilbert. The two became early members of the Gilbert and Sullivan Society in London, in which they both served on the Entertainment Committee, supervising 'dramatic recitals' for the Society in celebration of the operas' jubilees, including staging excerpts from Utopia, Limited and The Gondoliers for the Society's 1936 centenary celebration of the birth of W. S. Gilbert. Blackmore also served on the Society's Executive Committee and wrote articles for the Society's journal concerning stagecraft in general and his career with the D'Oyly Carte Opera Company. Blackmore made his last public appearance by reprising his role as Sir Bailey Barre in The Gilbert and Sullivan Society's concert version of Utopia, Limited on 29 April 1939, forty-six years after originating the role at the Savoy Theatre.

His wife predeceased him in 1939; they had no children. Blackmore died at the age of 81 in Uxbridge in Middlesex.
