= Juliette Nesville =

French opera singer and actress

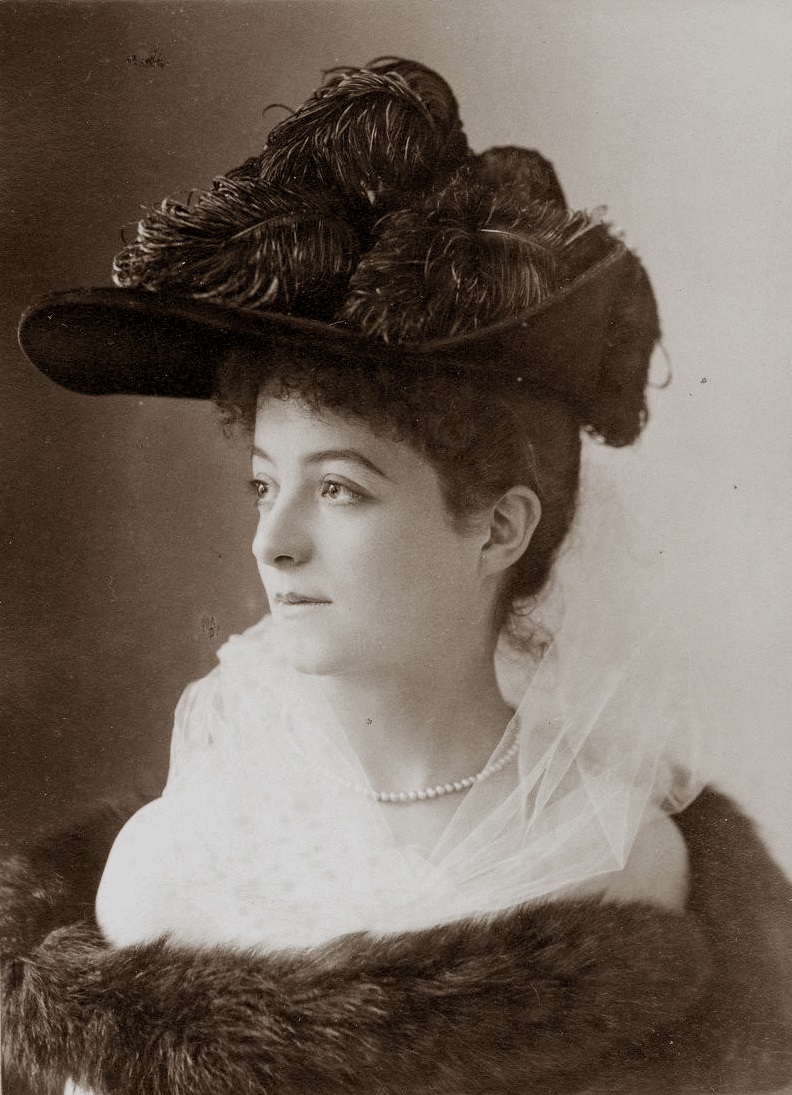
Nesville by the Atelier Nadar

Juliette Nesville was the stage name of Juliette-Hortense Lesne (30 July 1869 – 26 July 1900), a French singer and actress in operetta and musicals, who made most of her short career in London, after early success in Paris and Brussels.

After training at the Paris Conservatoire Nesville appeared in opéras comiques by Paul Lacôme, Robert Planquette, Edmond Audran and Charles Lecocq in 1890. After a highly successful appearance in the Brussels production of Audran's Miss Helyett she was engaged by the English manager Charles Wyndham in 1891 to play the part in London. She then appeared for George Edwardes in a succession of West End musical comedies during the rest of the decade, interspersed with two non-musical plays for other managements. She died in Paris after a short illness while appearing there in 1900, aged thirty.

== Life and career ==
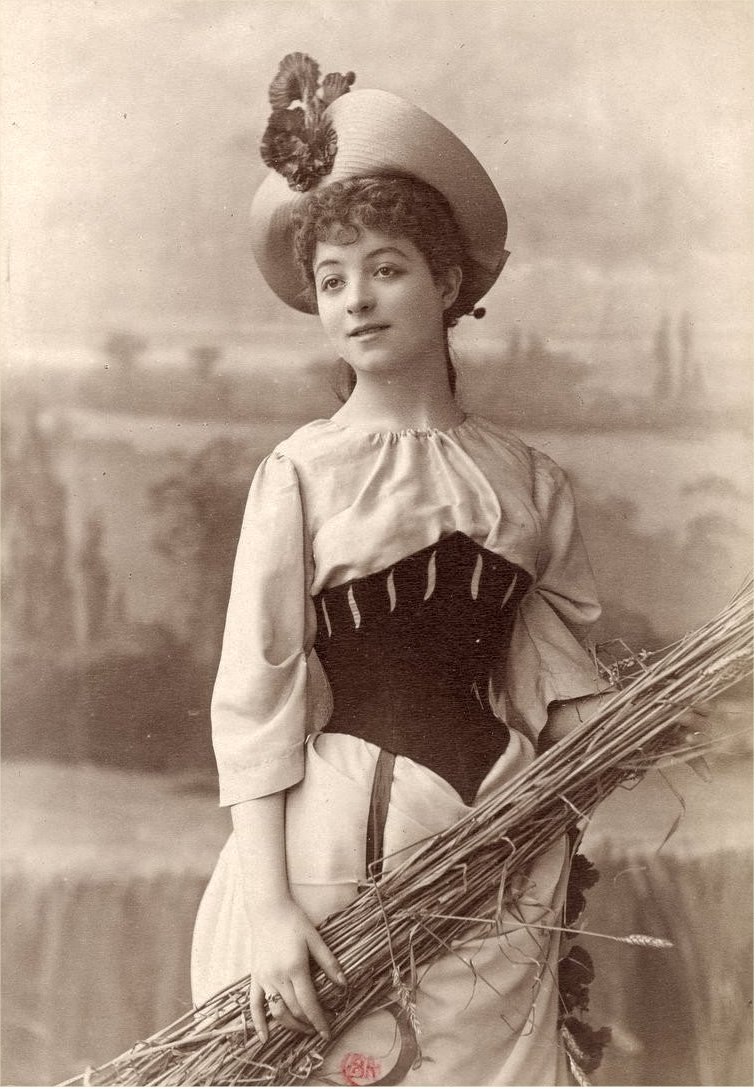
Nesville in the title role of Ma mie Rosette, 1890

Nesville was born in Paris, daughter of the proprietor of the Café de la Paix. Her parents had strict religious views, and she was educated in convent schools, first in France and, from the age of about twelve to fifteen, in England, by the Sisters of Notre Dame de Namur at Clapham. After her return to France she was admitted to the Paris Conservatoire, and while still a student there she was selected to play the small role of Loys, the page boy, in a revival of Jules Barbier's play Jeanne d'Arc, starring Sarah Bernhardt, at the Théâtre de la Porte Saint-Martin, Paris. The incidental music, by Charles Gounod, included a ballade for Loys, "Qui de nous ne connait ces vers mouillés de larmes". The composer heard several Conservatoire students sing it, including two future operatic stars, Lucienne Bréval and Lina Pacary, and recommended Nesville for the part. Her performance won praise. She requested and was given permission to leave the Conservatoire to create the title role in Paul Lacôme's opéra comique Ma mie Rosette at the Théâtre des Folies-Dramatiques, Paris, on 4 February 1890. The piece ran for only 41 performances, but she made a great impression, and appeared at the same theatre during 1890, starring in three revivals – as Nelly in Robert Planquette's opéra comique Rip, Azurine in a revival of Paul Lacôme's La Fille de l'air and Rosita in Edmond Audran's Gillette de Narbonne – and creating the role of Djemileh in Charles Lecocq's opérette L'égyptienne.

Nesville's success in Paris led the director of the Théâtre Royal des Galeries in Brussels to engage her to play the title role in Audran's Miss Helyett. In the words of the magazine The Theatre, "she took the town by storm". The English actor-manager Charles Wyndham saw her in the piece and engaged her for its forthcoming production in London. (Note: Marie Tempest was reported in June to have been offered the title role.) It opened at the Criterion Theatre in July 1891, under the title Miss Decima; the book was adapted by F. C. Burnand and the lyrics were adapted by Percy Reeve. The piece was well received, and Nesville's notices were highly complimentary: "positively captivated the audience … one of the brightest, prettiest and most refined French artists we have seen".

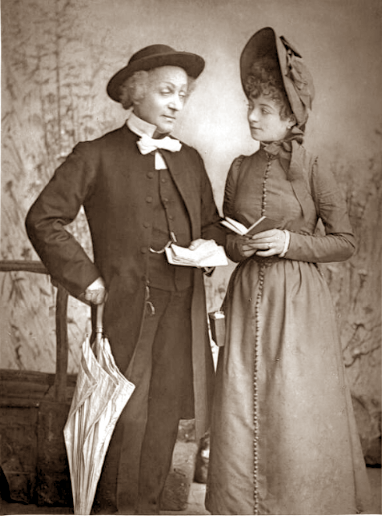
David James and Nesville in Miss Decima

In November 1891 Nesville married an Englishman, James Jeffrey Cooke. Their London residence was in Bloomsbury; she maintained a home in France at Le Vésinet. She said later in the decade that she thought of herself as an Englishwoman.

Nesville had a succession of roles in London productions of the 1890s. In 1892 and into 1893 she starred in the English adaptation of Ma mie Rosette, which did far better at the box-office than the original French production had done. From reviewers there was much praise for her acting and charm, and on the whole for her singing, although the critic in The Pall Mall Gazette thought that nature did not intend her to be a singer. She returned to the Criterion in to play Clairette in La fille de Madame Angot and was then engaged by George Edwardes to play Mina, the French maid, in A Gaiety Girl (1893).

In 1894 Nesville appeared with the Gaiety Girl company in New York and then toured the US; on her return to England she played her first non-musical role, Sally Lebrune, in Henry Arthur Jones's The Triumph of the Philistines, which George Alexander produced at the St James's Theatre in 1895. The critic of London Society dismissed the play but judged Nesville – "a really excellent actress" – its only redeeming feature. In the same year Nesville took over the role of Madame Amélie in An Artist's Model at Daly's Theatre. That was another Edwardes musical comedy, as was the long-running The Geisha (1896), in which she played Juliette Diamant. Illness obliged her to leave the cast for a while during the run, but she recovered so well that on her return she managed the unusual feat of playing in two different West End productions at the same time. While playing Juliette Diamant at Daly's she also played Gilberte Picard, a French singer, in the farce My Friend the Prince at the Garrick Theatre. She told an interviewer that she found it "rather good fun, but awful hard work: it leaves you little time to get out of one stage costume into another, and then back to the first theatre again." (Note: The distance between the two theatres was 158 yards (145 metres).)

Another American trip took place in 1897. After a two-week try-out at the Garrick, Edwardes sent a company to New York to play In Town; Nesville's colleagues in the company included W. Louis Bradfield and Marie Studholme. Nesville's role, Juliette Breville, was an addition to the original version, written specifically for her. She remained in New York to repeat her role of Sally Lebrune, in The Triumph of the Philistines. The Geisha was still running in London when she returned, and she rejoined the cast. She spent much of 1898 in a succession of engagements at the Alhambra music hall in Leicester Square, singing selections from the shows in which she had appeared. In May 1899 she was engaged to return to Paris, singing in a revival of Le voyage de Corbillon at the Folies-Dramatiques, and creating the role of Nina in a new "vaudeville-opérette", Madame Pistache. Les Annales du théâtre et de la musique thought her the best thing about the production. Back in London in September she created her last West End role, a French maid, in a new farce, The Elixir of Youth: "no more roguish, mischievous little cocquette has been seen for a long time on the stage than Miss Juliette Nesville's Suzette", commented The Era.

In July 1900 Nesville was in Paris to play the role of the Prince in Ernest Gillet's opéra bouffe Mariage princier, when she was taken ill. She died a few days later, aged thirty, and was buried at Le Vesinet.

== Notes, references and sources ==
=== Sources ===
- Noël, Edouard; Edmond Stoullig (1891). Les annales du théâtre et de la musique: 1890 (in French). Paris: G. Charpentier. OCLC 469004564.
- Noël, Edouard; Edmond Stoullig (1890). Les annales du théâtre et de la musique: 1899 (in French). Paris: Paul Ollendorf. OCLC 1772186.
