= Kosiki =

1876 opéra comique

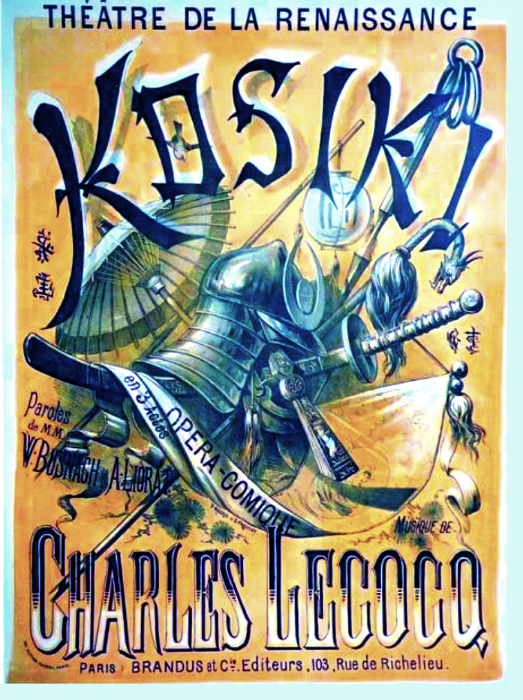
Poster for Paris production, 1876

Kosiki is an opéra comique in three acts, with music by Charles Lecocq and words by William Busnach and Armand Liorat. It was first produced at the Théâtre de la Renaissance, Paris, on 18 October 1876, with a cast headed by Zulma Bouffar and Jean-François Berthelier. By the standards of Lecocq's biggest successes its initial run of 75 performances was a disappointment.

The opera is set in Japan at an unspecified historical period, and depicts the attempt of a member of the imperial family to seize the throne by abducting the true heir and substituting a female baby. The abducted heir is found and all ends well.

== Background ==
By 1876 Lecocq had composed four notably successful operas, breaking box-office records with La fille de Madame Angot (1872) and supplanting Jacques Offenbach as Paris's most popular composer. In the early 1870s he had been based in Brussels. His first big success to premiere in Paris after his return there was La petite mariée written for the Théâtre de la Renaissance in 1875. Kosiki was its successor on that stage. William Busnach and Armand Liorat, the writers commissioned by Victor Koning, director of the theatre, were experienced librettists, having worked together or separately with composers including Offenbach, Georges Bizet, Léo Delibes and Louis Varney, and in Busnach's case, Lecocq himself. (Note: Busnach had written the libretti for Lecocq's one-act pieces Le myosotis (1866) and Les jumeaux de Bergame (1868).)

Following the literary success of the Comte de Beauvoir's account of his travels in the Far East, there was a fashion for Japanese themes in Paris (Japonisme). The piece was originally to be called L'héritier présomptif, a title discarded in favour of Le Mikado. It was widely reported in the French and British press that the latter title was banned by the official censor at the behest of Japanese diplomats. (Note: The Paris correspondent of The Era suggested that this should be taken cum grano salis: Koning was good at publicity.) The title Kosiki was adopted shortly before the premiere.

== Original cast ==
- Namitou – Eugène Vauthier
- Fitzo – Félix Puget
- Xicoco – Jean-François Berthelier
- Sagari – M. Urbain
- Soto-Siro – M. William
- Kosiki – Zulma Bouffar
- Nousima – Marie Harlem
- Nankaï – Pauline Lasselin
- Soutza – Mlle. Notermann
- Osaka – Mlle. Davenay
- Tougoum – Mlle. Daucourt
- Nangasaki – Mlle. Ribe
- Tin-Tin – Mlle. Nina
- Lili – Mlle. Darenne

== Synopsis ==
The scene is the Japanese city of Yeddo [now Tokyo].

=== Act 1: The Imperial throne room ===
The former emperor has been dead for six months, and official mourning is about to come to an end. A crowd are prostrating themselves before the empty throne. The prime minister, Xicoco, bids them rise and prepare to celebrate the coronation of Prince Kosiki as the new emperor. Kosiki, a naïve young person, seems to be under Xicoco's control, and does not raise objections to the latter's suggestion that an emperor needs an empress, preferably Xicoco's daughter, Nousima. She is in love with Xicoco's nephew Sagami, but Xicoco is determined she shall marry Kosiki, and he conducts the wedding ceremony forthwith.

Amid the general rejoicing, two characters are in the gravest difficulties: Fitzo, a poor street juggler and Soto-Siro, his father, are under sentence of death. In his enthusiasm to hail the new emperor Fitzo has begun entertaining the crowd before the official period of mourning is over – a capital offence. Kosiki takes an interest in the matter and pardons the two. He is so impressed by Fitzo that he appoints him his official adviser.

=== Act 2: Kosiki's boudoir ===
The new empress is disappointed to find her husband uninterested in her charms. Sagami is summoned to instruct Kosiki in the art of wooing, but Kosiki remains indifferent to female charms. It emerges that Kosiki is not a young man, but a young woman. Soon after Kosiki was born the old emperor's wicked cousin, Namitou, who coveted the throne, arranged to have the true heir abducted and a baby girl substituted; women cannot inherit the throne. On discovering the substitution, the old emperor threw Namitou into prison and resolved to thwart the plot to steal the succession. He brought the baby up as a boy, carefully keeping the child ignorant of the difference between the sexes.

Namitou escapes from prison, and hopes to claim the throne as the next male heir. Unfortunately for him, he has changed clothes with a senior official who has just absconded with a large sum of the emperor's money, and Xicoco, taking him for the fugitive, has him thrown into the river. He survives, and once ashore denounces Kosiki as a woman, and claims the throne. Kosiki and Fitzo flee the palace.

=== Act 3: A public garden, near the palace ===
Fitzo and Kosiki are making their living by juggling. It emerges that the infant boy abducted on Namitou's orders was not killed, as he had instructed: his henchmen recoiled from such a deed and instead handed the child to a poor countrywoman to raise. Xicoco discovers that the child was Fitzo, who is summoned to the throne. He has Kosiki at his side; Nousima marries her Sagami, and Namitou is pardoned.

== Numbers ==
- Act 1
  - Overture
  - Ensemble (chorus, Sagami, Xicoco) – Chantons l'hymne funéraire (Let's sing the funeral anthem)
  - Chorus – Gaîment déployons la bannière (Cheerfully let us unfurl the banner)
  - Couplets (Nousima) – Ah ! que la vie était maussade (Ah! that life was gloomy)
  - Duet (Nousima, Sagami) – Mon petit Sagami (My little Sagami)
  - Couplets (Namitou) – Ce n'est pas une sinécure (It is no sinecure)
  - Chorus – Le voici, le maître du monde (Here he is, the master of the world)
  - Couplets (Kosiki) – Voyez ces beaux cheveux d'ébène (See this beautiful ebony hair)
  - Chorus – Elle s'avance (She moves forward)
  - Ensemble (Kosiki, Nousima, Fitzo, Sagami, Xicoco, Soto-Siro, Chorus) – Grâce ! grâce! (Thanks! thanks!)
  - Couplets (Fitzo) – J'ai pour émerveiller les foules (I have to amaze the crowds)
  - Chorus – Léger comme l'oiseau (Light as a bird)
  - Duet (Kosiki, Fitzo) – Quoi! Fitzo, malgré la misère (What! Fitzo, despite the misery)
  - Finale (Kosiki, Nousima, Fitzo, Sagami, Xicoco, Chorus) – Aux pieds de la divine idole (At the feet of the divine idol)
- Act 2
  - Entr'acte
  - Buffo trio (Fitzo, Sagami, Xicoco) – La bonne place (The right place)
  - March (Kosiki, Fitzo, Sagami, Xicoco, Chorus) – Voici le coffre (Here is the chest)
  - Rondo (Kosiki) – Gardez-vous d'être trop rapide (Be careful – not too fast)
  - Wedding song (Xicoco) – C'est une fleur! (It's a flower!)
  - Trio (Kosiki, Nousima, Sagami) – Approche un peu (Approach a little)
  - Romance (Fitzo) – Et moi, moi qui, dans un moment (And me, who in a moment)
  - Couplets (Kosiki) – Allons, que rien ne t'effarouche (Come on, let nothing frighten you)
  - Couplets (Namitou) – Jadis certaine altesse (Once a certain royal person)
  - Duet and ensemble (Kosiki, Fitzo, Nousima, Sagami, Xicoco, Namitou, Chorus) – Il dit vrai (He speaks truly)
  - Couplets (Kosiki) – Oui, j'abandonne sceptre et couronne (Yes, I give up sceptre and crown)
  - Finale (Kosiki, Fitzo, Nousima, Sagami, Xicoco, Namitou, Chorus) – Quelle audace (What audacity)
- Act 3
  - Entr'acte
  - Chorus – Que la joie ici respire (May joy breathe here)
  - Couplets (Kosiki) – Par bonheur, j'étais sous la garde (Fortunately, I was in the care)
  - Couplets (Namitou) – Dans la forteresse où naguère (In the fortress where once)
  - Chorus – Sautons, dansons (Let's jump, dance)
  - Couplets (Kosiki, Fitzo) – Admirez sous ces traits bizarres (Admire under these bizarre features)
  - Duet (Fitzo, Kosiki) – En toi vais-je trouver (In you I shall find)
  - Finale (all) – Le plaisir ici nous invite (Pleasure invites us)

== Revivals ==
Like most Paris theatres at the time, the Théâtre de la Renaissance closed during the summer months. After the June–August closure in 1877 it was widely expected that Koning would revive Kosiki's successor, La Marjolaine, which had been doing good business before the break. The star of La Marjolaine, Jeanne Granier, had been unwell and was recuperating in Switzerland; Kosiki was chosen instead, and was well received on its second outing, and ran for a further 31 performances.

The work was produced in several theatres in Italy, and in Vienna (Carltheater, 1882), Hamburg and Berlin, but no London or New York productions were staged.

== Critical reception ==
The reviews varied from lukewarm to excellent. In Les Annales du Théâtre et de la Musique, Édouard Noël and Edmond Stoullig found the libretto inadequate –"gaiety is lacking, the comic roles are not good; it remains languid and colourless" – and felt that the music was equally disappointing: "it lacks flexibility, verve and originality. It is always well made, elegant, well-groomed in form; but there are no highlights, the inspiration seems tired, and the melodic flow is absolutely second-hand." (Note: La gaieté y manque, les rôles comiques y sont mal venus; elle reste languissante et incolore. La musique de M. Lecocq s'est ressentie de ce défaut, et elle aussi manque de souplesse, de verve et d'originalité. Elle reste toujours bien faite, élégante, soignée dans la forme; mais les points saillants n'existent pas, l'inspiration semble fatiguée, et le jet mélodique est absolument de seconde main.) The reviewers felt that Lecocq might be writing too much music to sustain the excellence of which he was capable. (Note: M. Lecocq travaille peut-être plus que de raison, et sans laisser à son imagination le temps nécessaire pour donner les fruits qu'il en attend.) The reviewer for the London paper The Daily Telegraph was much more impressed, commenting that no praise was too high for the music, which was worthy to be presented at the Opéra-Comique – "M. Lecocq's true place is in the home of Hérold and Auber". The Musical World found the music "bright, sparkling, musician-like" with no hint of vulgarity. The Era thought the music Lecocq's best score since La fille de Madame Angot, and predicted great success for the piece.

== Notes, references and sources ==
=== Sources ===
- Noël, Edouard [in French]; Stoullig, Edmond [in French] (1877). Les Annales du théâtre et de la musique. Deuxième année: 1876 (in French). Paris: G. Charpentier. OCLC 491464809.
- Noël, Edouard; Stoullig, Edmond (1878). Les annales du théâtre et de la musique. Troisième année: 1877 (in French). Paris: G. Charpentier. OCLC 81973146.
