= Clara Novello =

English soprano singer (1818–1908)

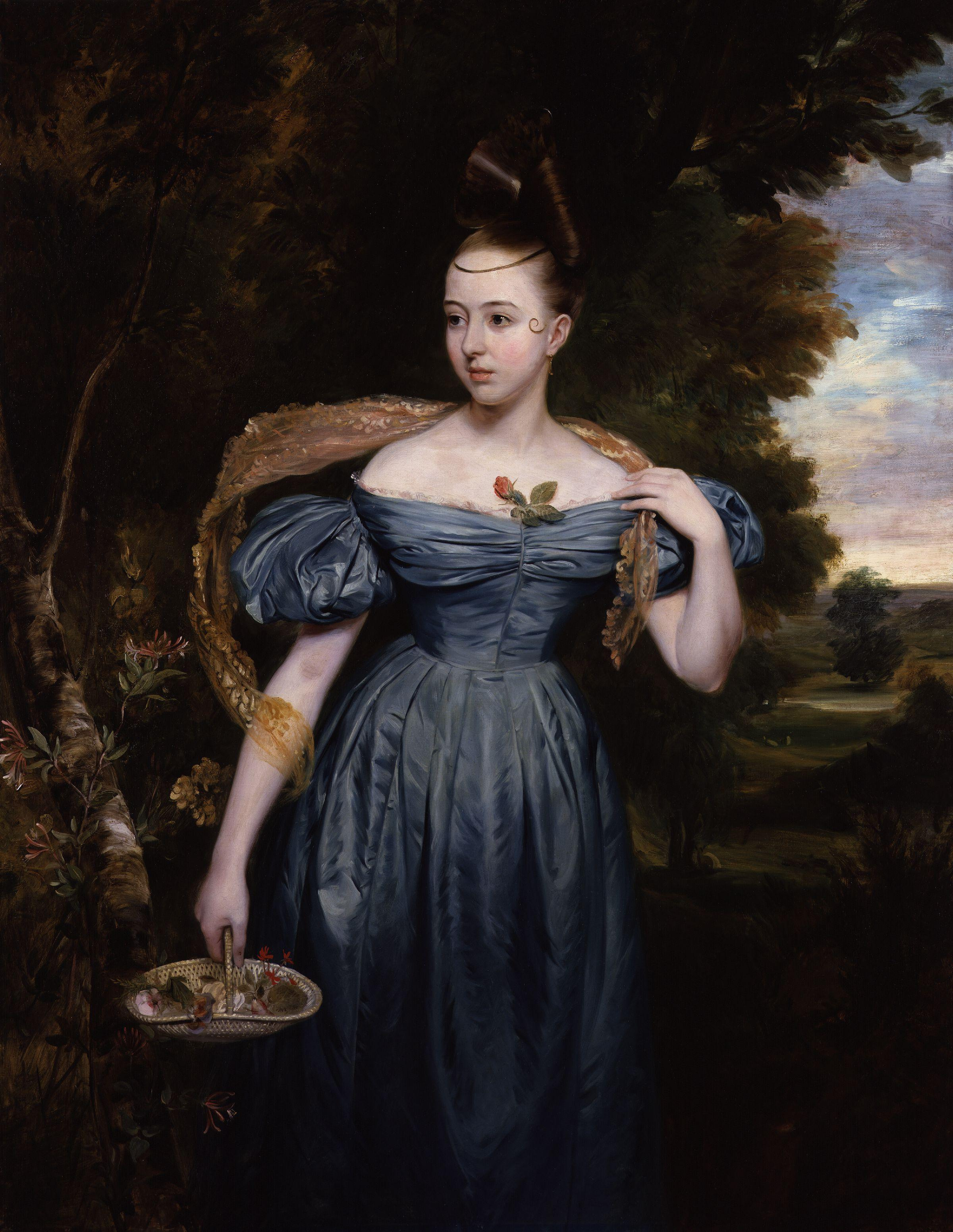
An 1833 portrait of Clara Novello by Edward Petre Novello

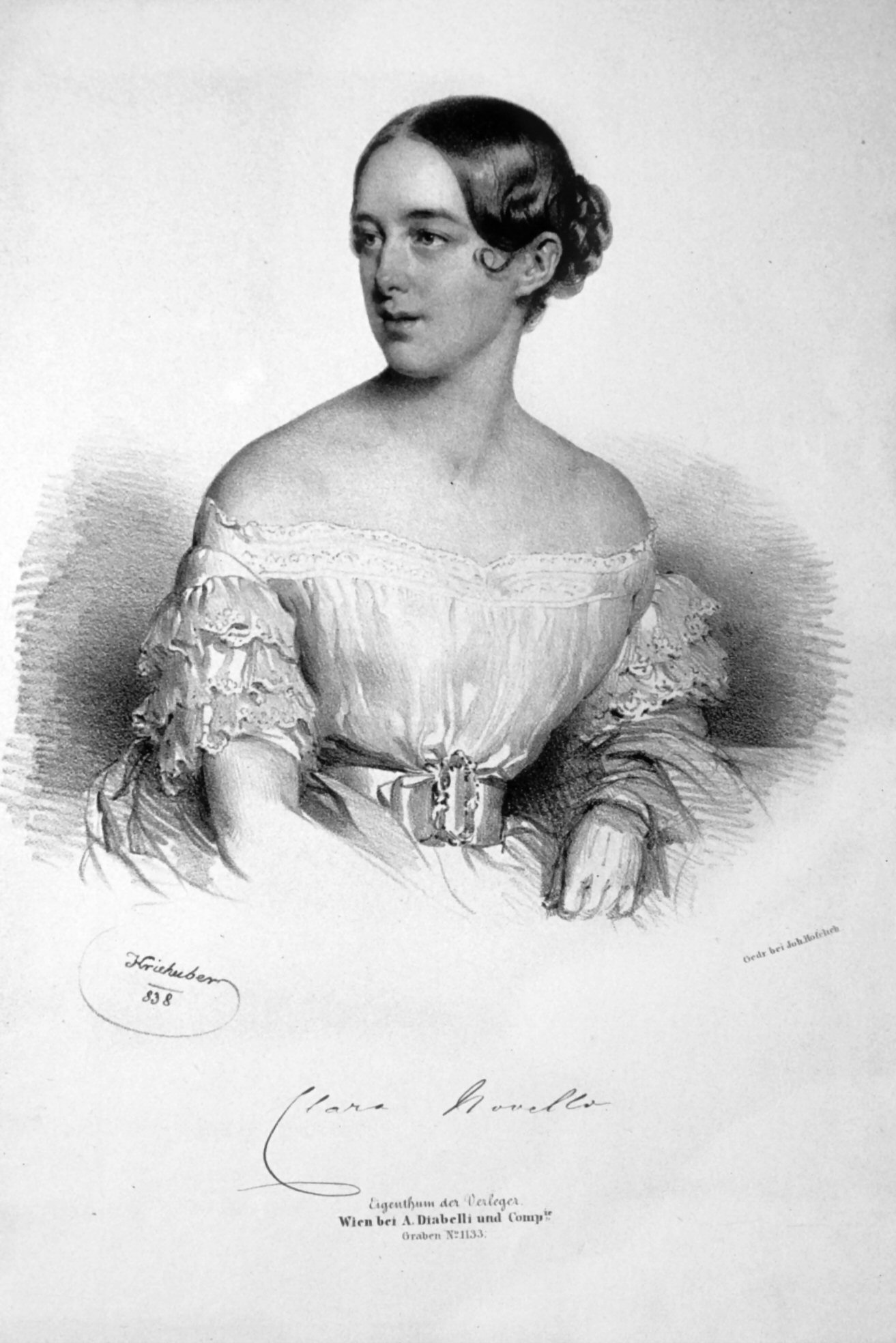
Clara Novello, Lithograph by Josef Kriehuber, 1838

Clara Anastasia Novello (10 June 1818 – 12 March 1908) was an acclaimed soprano, the fourth daughter of Vincent Novello, a musician and music publisher, and his wife, Mary Sabilla Hehl. Her acclaimed soprano and pure style made her one of the greatest vocalists, alike in opera, oratorio and on the concert stage, from 1833 onwards. In 1843 she married Count Gigliucci, and retired in 1861. Charles Lamb wrote a poem ("To Clara N.") in her praise.

== Biography ==
She was born in Oxford Street, London, on 10 June 1818, the fourth daughter of Vincent Novello and Mary Sabilla Hehl. Mary Victoria Cowden Clarke was her eldest sister. Clara was taken in childhood to York, and was placed under Miss Hill, the leading singer, and John Robinson, organist of the Roman Catholic chapel there. Her talents were at once displayed; and on Easter Sunday, when Miss Hill was suddenly indisposed, Clara offered to sing all her solos from memory, and succeeded. In 1829, she became a pupil of the Institution royale de musique classique et religieuse in Paris. She always retained the strongest appreciation of her training there; Palestrina's music was much sung, and Clara ascribed her perfect sostenuto to having sung in his motets, and being obliged to hold the suspensions. The academy declined after the revolution of 1830, and Clara, who had had unpleasant experiences of the fighting, returned to England.

On 22 October 1832, aged 14, she made her first public appearance, in a concert at Windsor, with full success; and in December she took the soprano part in Beethoven's Missa Solennis. She was soon among the first singers of the day, being engaged at the whole series of Ancient Concerts, at the Philharmonic Concerts, and the Three Choirs Festival. She sang in a sestet, Grisi leading, at the Handel commemoration in June 1834; Lord Mount-Edgcumbe describes her as

a very young girl with a clear good voice.

Her father's friend, Charles Lamb, though quite unmusical, wrote the lines 'To Clara N.' published in the Athenæum, 26 July 1834.

She was left without a rival on the retirement of Catherine Stephens, Countess of Essex, in 1835, and took the leading soprano part at all important English concerts. Handel's music was particularly adapted to her style. At the Manchester Festival in September 1836, she had much useful advice from the dying Maria Malibran.

In 1837, Felix Mendelssohn invited her to the Gewandhaus Concerts, Leipzig, where she appeared on 2 November 1837, and several times later. She was well received, and succeeded in making German audiences appreciate Handel's solos. Schumann declared that nothing for years past had given him so much pleasure as Miss Novello's voice, 'every note sharply defined as on the keyboard.' Mendelssohn wrote that Clara Novello and Mrs. Shaw (her successor next winter) 'are the best concert singers we have heard in Germany for a long time.' She sang also at Berlin, Dresden, Prague, Vienna, and Munich. Then visiting Rossini at Bologna, she was advised to study opera for a year; she took lessons from Micheroux at Milan.

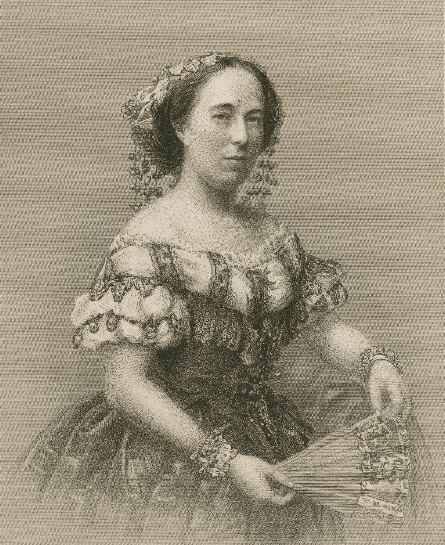
An 1863 print of Clara Novello

In 1839, she once more made a concert tour, travelling down the Rhine to Düsseldorf, through North Germany to Berlin, and thence to St. Petersburg. Her first appearance on the stage was at Padua in Rossini's Semiramide, on 6 July 1841. Unqualified successes in Rome, Genoa, and other large Italian cities followed; Rossini sent specially for her to take the soprano part in his just completed Stabat Mater. Owing to the mismanagement of agents, she was announced to sing at two places – at Rome and Genoa – during the carnival of 1843; the Roman authorities refused a permit to leave the territory and detained her under arrest at Fermo. On her appealing as a British subject to Lord Aberdeen, then English foreign secretary, the matter was arranged by arbitration. Count Gigliucci, the governor of Fermo, fell in love with his prisoner; she agreed to marry him as soon as professional engagements permitted. At Novello's last appearance in Rome she was recalled twenty-nine times; there was some disturbance at Genoa. In March she returned to England, and appeared in English opera at Drury Lane; also in Handel's Acis and Galatea, and at the Sacred Harmonic Society and other concerts. On 22 November, she was married to Count Gigliucci at Paddington parish church, and retired with him to Italy.

During the troubles of 1848 their property was confiscated, and the countess resolved to resume her public appearances. In 1850, she sang in opera at Rome; then at Lisbon, and on 18 July 1851 re-appeared in London, singing in Handel's Messiah at Exeter Hall. Her embellishments brought some disapprobation, though her voice was pronounced to have gained in strength, and to have lost nothing of its beauty. She took the place of leading English concert soprano, appearing only once again in England in opera, in I Puritani at Drury Lane on 5 July 1853. At Milan, she sang in opera during the carnivals from 1854–6. In England her singing was regarded as the embodiment of the best traditions of the Handelian style; like Mara and Catalani before, and Lemmens-Sherrington after, she was specially distinguished in her rendering of 'I know that my Redeemer liveth,' and she sang the opening phrase in one breath. On the opening of the Crystal Palace, on 10 June 1854, her singing, 'heard to remote comers of the building', seemed grander than ever before.

She was engaged as the soprano soloist for the premiere of the pastorale May Queen by William Sterndale Bennett, a work commissioned for the opening of the Leeds Music Festival in 1858 and conducted by the composer.

Probably the finest revelation of her powers was at the Handel Festival there in June 1859. She then determined to retire. After singing in Handel's 'Messiah' at the Crystal Palace, she made her last appearance at a benefit concert at St. James's Hall on 21 November 1860, the final strain being the National Anthem.

== Retirement ==
In her retirement she lived with her husband at Rome and Fermo. He died on 29 March 1893; she died, aged 89, on 12 March 1908, at Rome, leaving a daughter, Valeria.

== Influence ==
The Welsh singer Clara Novello Davies was named for Clara Novello, and her own son Ivor Novello carried on this family name.

== Family ==
Children of Vincent Novello and Mary Sabilla Novello include

- Mary Victoria Cowden Clarke (née Novello) (1809–1898), literary scholar and writer
- Joseph Alfred Novello (1810–1896), music publisher
- Edward Petre Novello (1813–1836), painter (of family portrait in NPG)
- Emma Novello (1814–c. 1880), painter
- Clara Novello (1818–1908), soprano
- Sabilla Novello (1821–1904), singer and teacher of singing
- Florence Novello

== External References ==
- This article incorporates text from a publication now in the public domain: Davey, Henry (1912). "Novello, Clara Anastasia". In Lee, Sidney (ed.). Dictionary of National Biography (2nd supplement). London: Smith, Elder & Co.
- George Grove (1918). Grove's Dictionary of Music and Musicians. T. Presser Col. pp. 411–412.
- Chisholm, Hugh, ed. (1911). "Novello, Vincent s.v. Clara Novello" . Encyclopædia Britannica. Vol. 19 (11th ed.). Cambridge University Press. p. 838.
- Cooper, Victoria L. "Novello, Clara Anastasia (1818–1908)". Oxford Dictionary of National Biography (online ed.). Oxford University Press. doi:10.1093/ref:odnb/35263. (Subscription, Wikipedia Library access or UK public library membership required.)

== External reference ==
- Autograph letter by Clara Novello at Houghton Library, Harvard University
