= L'Égyptienne (Lecocq) =

Operetta in 3 acts and 11 scenes by Charles Lecocq

Playbill L'égyptienne, opérette militaire en 3 actes et 11 tableaux

L'Égyptienne (The Egyptian [Woman]) is an 1890 operetta in 3 acts and 11 scenes by Charles Lecocq, to a libretto by Henri Chivot, Charles Nuitter and Alexandre Beaumont. The operetta was publicized as an "opérette militaire". It premiered 8 November 1890 at the Folies-Dramatiques, Paris. The Revue d'art dramatique noted that the production took place at the reopened Eden Théâtre, now transformed into an opera house. The reviewer of the Courrier de l'art commented that Lecocq was no longer producing operettas with the frequency of the past and was more selective in choice of material. The piece was not a success and ran for 22 performances.

== Original cast ==
- Cassegrain – M. Gobin
- Hector – M. Herault
- Aboul-Abbas – M. Guyon, fils
- Kacem – M. Montaubry
- Descharmettes – M. Maillard
- Delphine – Mdlle. Pierny
- Djemileh – Juliette Nesville
- Théréson – Madame Aciana
- Madame de Montalban – Madame Genat
- Myrza – Mddle. Vialda

Source: The Era.

== Synopsis ==
Captain Hector, a gallant French infantry officer, and Mdlle. Delphine, daughter of Madame de Montalban, go up in a captive balloon at Toulon in 1798; the cable breaks, the balloon is wafted among the clouds, where the two while away the time by singing duets; the balloon suddenly descends in the Mediterranean, the couple are rescued, and Delphine's mother has to consent to their immediate marriage. But she plays a trick on her new son-in-law: she is the widow of a general, and using her influence at army headquarters she has him appointed to General Kléber's staff and posted immediately to Egypt. Within an hour of the wedding he embarks, leaving his bride in tears.

After taking part in a French victory, and winning promotion to the rank of major, Hector is wounded during a revolt in Cairo. A rich and beautiful young admirer, Djemileh, sends her servants to rescue him and bring him under her roof. There they bill and coo in a dangerously intimate way during his recovery, while their attendants, Cassegrain and Myrza, do likewise, although the proprieties are – just – observed on all sides.

Aboul-Abbas and Kacem – Djemileh's cruel uncle and her ferocious fiancé – cut short the double tête-à-tête. Hector and Cassegrain are bound with ropes, but vengeance is forestalled by the sudden arrival of Delphine, accompanied by Cassegrain's formidable wife. When Delphine hears of her husband's supposed affair with the Egyptienne, she flies into a rage and threatens to leave him to his conquest, but when the innocence of his flirtation is proved she relents, and all winds up happily with the capture of Aboukir and the triumph of the invincible French, flourishing their Tricolore.

Source: The Era.

== Sources ==
- Noël, Edouard; Edmond Stoullig (1891). Les annales du théâtre et de la musique. Seizième année: 1890 (in French). Paris: G. Charpentier. OCLC 983192047.
