= William Bertrand Busnach =

French dramatist

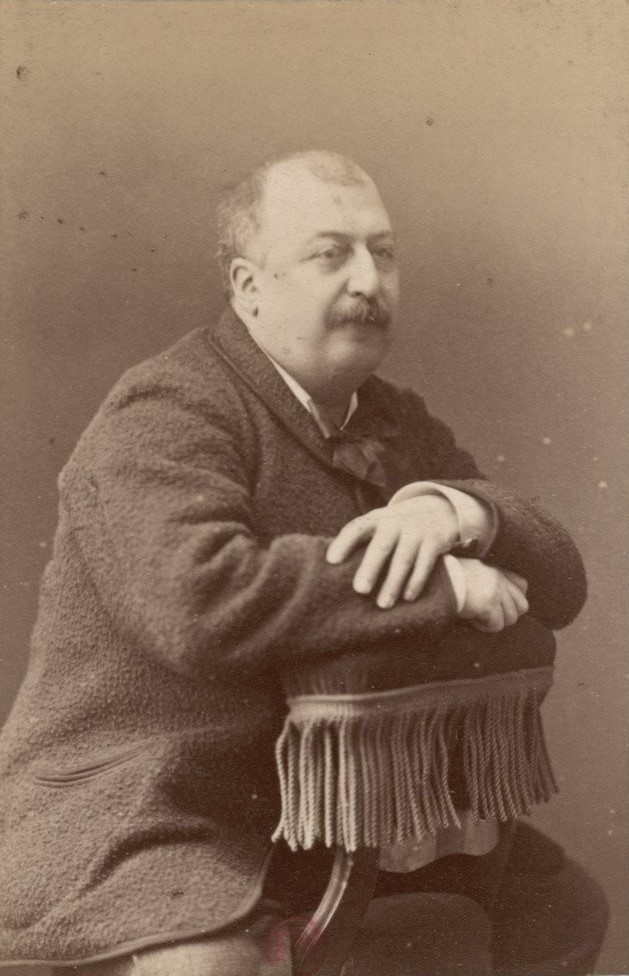
William Busnach, c. 1875

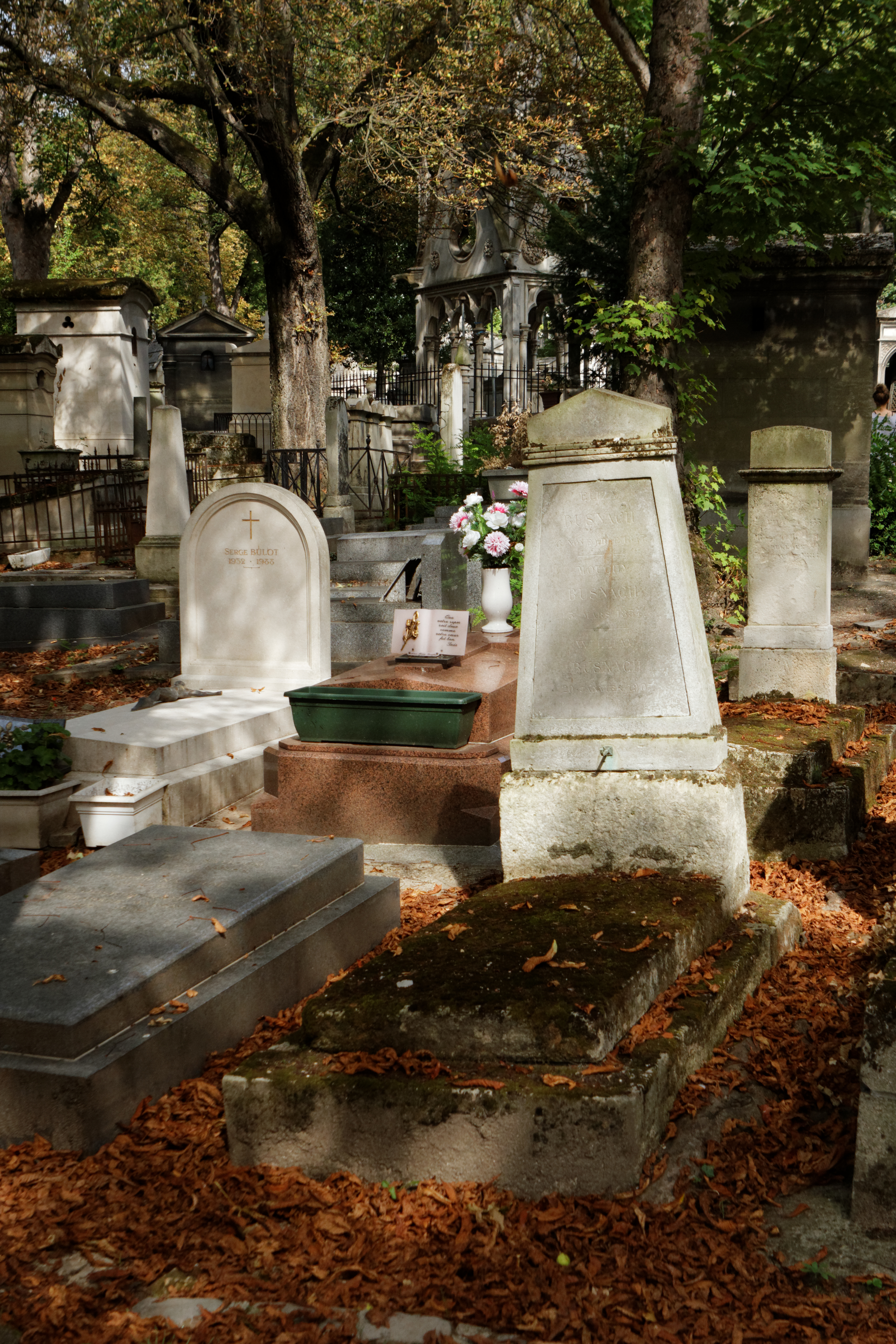
Busnach's grave at Père Lachaise Cemetery

William Bertrand Busnach (7 March 1832, Paris – 20 January 1907, Paris) was a French dramatist.

== Biography ==
Busnach was a nephew of the composer Fromental Halévy. His father was associated with David Ben Joseph Coen Bakri, to whom France was indebted to the amount of some twenty-odd million francs for provisions furnished to Napoleon Bonaparte in Egypt. The lawsuit lasted for more than fifty years, and Busnach and his partner were not paid in full at the end. The elder Busnach, an Algerian Jew, became a naturalised Italian in the time of the Deys, and was the first interpreter of the French army. He established himself in Paris in 1835. He was of Portuguese-Jewish descent through his mother Élisa Esther, member of the Rodrigues-Henriques Family.

William – an Italian Jew born in France of an Algerian father, with a German surname and an English given name – was at first employed in the customs department. He subsequently devoted himself to dramatic work, writing many plays, a number of which have been successful. They include: Les Virtuoses du Pavé, 1864; Première Fraîcheur, Paris-Revue, 1869; Héloïse et Abélard, with music by Henry Litolff, 1872; Forte en Gueule, La Liqueur d'Or, in collaboration with Armand Liorat, music by Laurent de Rillé 1873; Kosiki, with Liorat, music by Alexandre Charles Lecocq, 1876 and with Albert Vanloo Ali-Baba, 1887.

In 1867 Busnach assumed the direction of the Théâtre de l'Athénée, where several of his operettas (Fleur-de-Thé, etc.) were performed. His greatest successes he achieved, however, with his adaptation of celebrated novels for the stage; for example, L'Assommoir, 1881; Nana, 1882; Pot-Bouille, 1883, all by Émile Zola; Le Petit Jacques, by Jules Claretie, 1885; La Marchande des Quatre Saisons, etc.

Busnach is also the author of the following novels: La Fille de M. Lecoq, 1886; Le Petit Gosse, 1889; Cyprienne Guérard, 1895, etc.

A chapter of Vanloo's memoirs Sur le plateau, Souvenirs d'un librettiste is about Busnach, where Vanloo described his colleague as a jovial, lively man, on close terms with all Paris, and who took delight in using strong language.

== Works ==
- Les Virtuoses du pavé, bouffonnerie musicale en 1 acte, musique de Auguste L'Eveillé, Paris, Folies-Marigny, 19 avril 1864, Paris, E. Dentu, in-12 ;
- Cinq par jour !, folie-vaudeville en 1 acte, Paris, Folies-Marigny, 27 avril 1865, E. Dentu, 1865 ;
- Les Gammes d’Oscar, folie musicale en 1 acte, musique de Georges Douay, Paris, théâtre des Folies-Marigny, 20 mai 1865, Le Bailly, 1900 ;
- C’est pour ce soir ! à-propos en 1 acte, avec A. Belot, Paris, Bouffes-Parisiens, 25 avril 1865, Michel Lévy frères, 1865 ;
- Les Petits du premier, opéra-bouffe en 1 acte, musique de Émile Albert Paris, Bouffes-Parisiens, 3 mars 1865, Paris, E. Dentu, 1865, in-12 ;
- Le Myosotis, aliénation mentale et musicale, avec Amédée de Noé, musique de Charles Lecocq, Paris, Palais-Royal, 2 mai 1866, A. Lacroix, Verboeckhoven et Cie, 1874 ;
- La Vipérine, opérette en 1 acte, avec Jules Prével, Paris, Folies-Marigny, 19 octobre 1866, Michel Lévy frères, 1867 ;
- Les canards l’ont bien passée ! revue en 3 actes et 7 tableaux, précédée de la Veillée en Bourgogne, Paris, théâtre des Folies Marigny, 23 décembre 1866, Paris, Librairie internationale, 1867, in-12 ;
- Le Quai Malaquais, opérette en un acte, avec Élie Frébault, musique d’Amédée de Roubin, Paris, théâtre des Folies Marigny, 6 juillet 1866, Paris, Morris, 1872, in-12 ;
- La Pénitente, opéra-comique en 1 acte, avec Henri Meilhac, Paris, opéra-Comique, 13 mai 1868, Paris, E. Dentu, 1868 ;
- Paris-Revue, revue en 4 actes, théâtre du Châtelet, 1869 ;
- Héloïse et Abélard, opéra-comique en 3 actes, avec Clairville, musique d’Henri Litolff, théâtre des Folies dramatiques, 1872 ;
- La Rosière de Valentino, bouffonnerie en 1 acte, Paris, Folies-Bergère, 2 février 1872, L. Bathlot, 1873 ;
- Sol-si-ré-pif-pan, bouffonnerie musicale en 1 acte, Paris, Château-d’Eau, 16 novembre 1872, Paris, Tresse, 1872 ;
- Pomme d’api, opérette en 1 acte, avec Ludovic Halévy, musique de Jacques Offenbach, théâtre de la Renaissance, 1873 ;
- L’Éducation d’Ernestine, comédie-vaudeville en un acte, Paris, 1873, in-12 ;
- La Liqueur d’or, opéra-comique en 3 actes, avec Armand Liorat, musique de Laurent de Rillé, Paris, Menus-Plaisirs, 11 décembre 1873, Paris, Tresse, 1874 ;

Prohibited after the ninth performance

- Le Club des séparées, folie-vaudeville en 1 acte, Paris, Renaissance, 24 avril 1873, Paris, Tresse, 1873 ;
- Les Esprits des Batignolles, à-propos-vaudeville en 1 acte, Paris, Palais-Royal, 20 juin 1873, Paris, Tresse, 1873 ;
- L’Opéra aux Italiens, à-propos en 1 acte, Paris, Tresse, 1874 ;
- La Belle au bois dormant, opéra-féerie en 4 actes, avec Clairville, musique de Henry Litolff, théâtre du Châtelet, 1874 ;
- Mariée depuis midi, pièce en 1 acte, mêlée de chant, avec A. Liorat, musique de Georges Jacobi, Paris, Bouffes-Parisiens, 7 mars 1874, Paris, Tresse, 1874, in-12 ;
- Kosiki, opéra comique en trois actes, avec Armand Liorat, musique de Charles Lecocq, Paris, théâtre de la Renaissance, 18 octobre 1876, Paris, Tresse, 1875-1880 ;
- Les Boniments de l’année, revue en 4 actes et 10 tableaux, dont un prologue, avec Paul Burani, Paris, Athénée-Comique, 28 décembre 1877, Paris, Le Bailly, 1878, in-12 ;
- L’Assommoir, drame en 5 actes et 9 tableaux, avec Octave Gastineau, d’après Émile Zola, Paris, théâtre de l’Ambigu, 18 janvier 1879, Paris, G. Charpentier, 1881, in-12 ;
- Le Beau Solignac, drame en 5 actes, avec Jules Clarétie et Charles de La Rounat, théâtre du Châtelet, 1880 ;
- Nana, drame en 5 actes, d’après Émile Zola, théâtre de l’Ambigu, 1881 ;
- Zoé Chien-Chien, drame en 8 tableaux, dont un prologue, avec Arthur Arnould, Paris, théâtre des Nations, 5 février 1881, G. Charpentier, 1882, in-12 ;
- La Soucoupe, comédie en 1 acte, Paris, Gymnase, 7 octobre 1881, Paris, Tresse, 1881 ;
- La Marchande des quatre saisons, drame en 5 actes et 8 tableaux Ambigu Comique, 1882 ;
- Le Phoque à ventre blanc, parade musicale en 1 acte, musique de Georges Douay, A. Hélaine, E. Chatot, 1883 ;
- Pot Bouille, pièce en 5 actes, d’après Émile Zola, théâtre de l’Ambigu, 1883 ;
- Carnot, drame en 5 actes, avec Henri Blondeau et Léon Jonathan, théâtre de l’Ambigu, 1884 ;
- Le Petit Jacques, drame en 9 tableaux, Paris, 1885, in-12 ;
- La Fille de M. Lecoq, avec Henri Chabrillat, Paris, G. Charpentier, 1886 ;
- Mathias Sandorf, drame en 5 actes, avec Georges Maurens d’après Jules Verne, théâtre de l’Ambigu, 1887 ;
- Ali-Baba, opéra-comique en 3 actes et 8 tableaux, avec Albert Vanloo, musique de Charles Lecoq, Bruxelles, Alhambra, 11 novembre 1887, Choudens, 1888 ;
- Le Petit Gosse, Paris, Perrin, 1889 ;
- L’Œuf rouge, opéra comique en 3 actes, Paris, 1890, in-12 ;
- La Fille de Fanchon la vielleuse, opéra-comique en 4 actes, avec Armand Liorat, musique de Louis Varney, théâtre des Folies dramatiques, 1891 ;
- Les Commis-voyageurs, vaudeville en 3 actes, théâtre de la Renaissance, 1892 ;
- Vain Sacrifice, roman, Paris, E. Flammarion, 1893, in-12 ;
- Cyprienne Guérard, Paris, C. Lévy, 1895, in-12 ;
- Le Remplaçant, comédie en 3 actes, Paris, 1898, in-12. ;
- Voleuse ! scènes de la vie populaire, avec Ferdinand Bloch, Paris, Divan japonais, 30 septembre 1899, P.-V. Stock, 1900 ;
- L’Affiche rondeau, avec A. Flan ; musique de Georges Douay, Cartereau ;
- Le Château-Yquem, comédie en 1 acte, Tresse et Stock ;
- Le Crime du bois de Verrières, instruction judiciaire, Paris, E. Flammarion, 1901.
