= Campaign for Tobacco-Free Kids =

American anti-tobacco organization

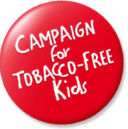
- Formation: September 1995
- Legal status: Non-profit organization
- Purpose: Advocacy
- Headquarters: 1400 Eye St., Washington, D.C. 20005-6531
- President: Matthew Myers
- Key people: Bill Novelli (founding president), Bill Corr (former executive director)
- Website: www.tobaccofreekids.org

The Campaign for Tobacco-Free Kids is an American non-profit membership organization headquartered in Washington, D.C., that advocates in favor of reducing tobacco consumption. It has been called "a leading anti-tobacco organization" by the New York Times.

== History ==
The organization was established in September 1995, with Bill Novelli as its first president. Novelli resigned from the organization at the end of 1999 to work at the AARP. His replacement by Matthew Myers was announced together with Novelli's resignation and became effective January 1, 2000. Myers, who had previously been the organization's chief legal counsel and was in charge of its advocacy, outreach, and grassroots development activities, has been the organization's president ever since.

Organizations that helped to found the Campaign for Tobacco-Free Kids included the Robert Wood Johnson Foundation, the American Cancer Society, and the American Heart Association, among others.
