= Vincent Novello =

English musician and music publisher (1781–1861)

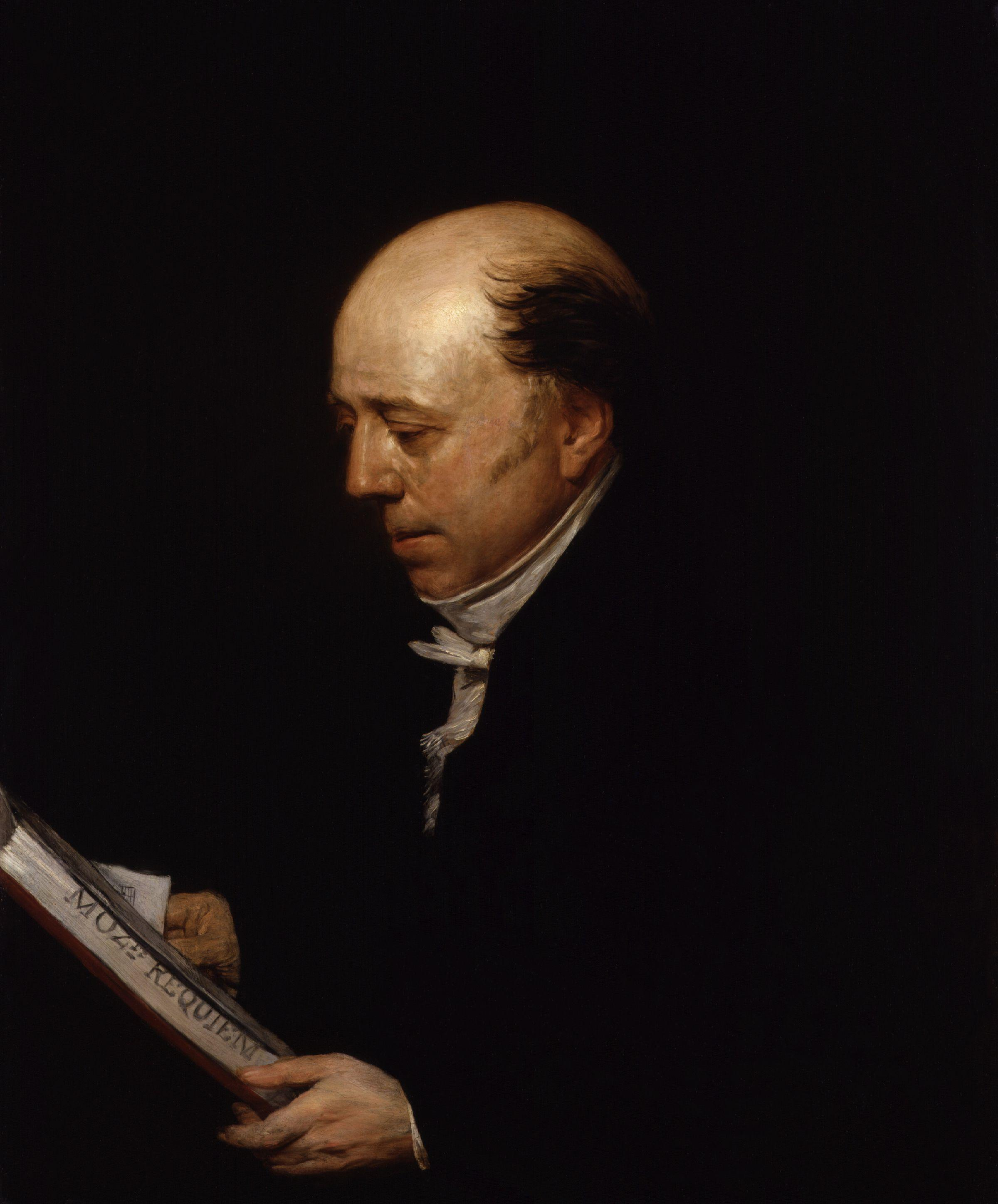
Vincent Novello in the 1830s, by Edward Petre Novello

Vincent Novello (6 September 1781 – 9 August 1861), was an English musician and music publisher born in London. He was an organist, chorister, conductor and composer, but he is best known for bringing to England many works now considered standards, and with his son he created a major music publishing house.

== Life ==
Vincent, born at 240 Oxford Street, was the son of Giuseppe Novello, an Italian confectioner who moved to London in 1771. As a boy Vincent was a chorister at the Sardinian Embassy Chapel in Duke Street, Lincoln's Inn Fields, where he learnt the organ from Samuel Webbe; and from 1796 to 1822 he became in succession organist of the Sardinian, Spanish (in Manchester Square) and Portuguese (at the Portuguese Embassy chapel off Grosvenor Square), and from 1840 to 1843 of St Mary Moorfields. He taught music privately throughout his career. One of his most notable pupils was musicologist and music critic Edward Holmes. He was an original member of the Philharmonic Society, of the Classical Harmonists and of the Choral Harmonists, officiating frequently as conductor, and was a conductor/accompanist at the King's Theatre.

Novello married Mary Sabilla Hehl in 1808. From 1834 they lived at 69 Meard Street, Soho. In 1849 they went to live in Nice for the sake of Mary's health. She died there of cholera in 1854. Novello remained in Nice, where he died in 1861 just before his eightieth birthday.

== Musical activities ==
Many of Novello's original compositions were sacred music, such as the cantata Rosalba, commissioned by the Philharmonic Society and premiered in March 1834. One sacred composition is the tune 'Albano' to the hymn 'Once, only once, and once for all'. A secular example is Old May Morning, which won the Manchester Prize for best cheerful glee in 1832. His great contribution, however, together with Christian Ignatius Latrobe, lay in the introduction to England of unknown compositions by the great masters, such as the Masses written by Haydn and those by Mozart, the works of Palestrina, the manuscripts of the Fitzwilliam Museum, and many other works that are now in the core repertoire.

Novello and his wife Mary held regular musical evenings at his home, attracting a wide range of literary, artistic and musical figures, including Charles and Mary Lamb, Leigh Hunt, Percy Shelley, William Hazlitt, Charles Cowden Clarke, John Keats and his pupil Edward Holmes. The evenings were described by Lamb in his essay ‘A Chapter on Ears’. The young Felix Mendelssohn and the singer Maria Malibran attended later meetings.

== Publishing ==
His first venture into editing and publishing was the Collection of Sacred Music (1811), compiled from manuscripts in use at the Portuguese Chapel, which marks the founding of the publishing firm Novello & Co. There followed Twelve Easy Masses (1816, including three of his own compositions), the Collection of Motets for the Offertory (c 1818) and The Evening Service (1822). Between 1819 and 1824, Novello also published a series of masses by Haydn and Mozart in the form of vocal scores that were affordable and accessible to choral societies for the first time.

His son Joseph Alfred Novello (1810–1896), who had started as a bass singer, took over as head of the business in 1829 at the early age of nineteen, operating it from 67 Frith Street in Soho. It was Alfred who really established the business, and he is credited with introducing affordable music and departing from the method of publishing by subscription. From 1841 Henry Littleton assisted him, becoming a partner in 1861, when the firm became Novello & Co., and, on J.A. Novello's retirement in 1866, sole proprietor. Having incorporated the firm of Ewer & Co. in 1867, the title was changed to Novello, Ewer & Co., and still later back to Novello & Co., and, on Henry Littleton's death in 1888, his two sons carried on the business.

== The Mozart pilgrimage ==
In 1829, Mary and Vincent Novello travelled to Austria in hopes of gathering biographical material about Wolfgang Amadeus Mozart, who had died 38 years earlier in Vienna. They had also taken up a collection for Mozart's older sister Maria Anna Mozart, sometimes called today by her childhood name "Nannerl", whom they mistakenly thought to be impoverished. In Salzburg they met with and interviewed Mozart's wife Constanze and her son Franz Xaver Wolfgang Mozart. They also were able to speak with Maria Anna Mozart, who, however, by this time had become very old and feeble and would die later that year. The Novellos never wrote the book that they had planned as the result of their project, but their travel diaries were preserved (published 1955) and remain as a useful contribution to Mozart scholarship.

== Family ==
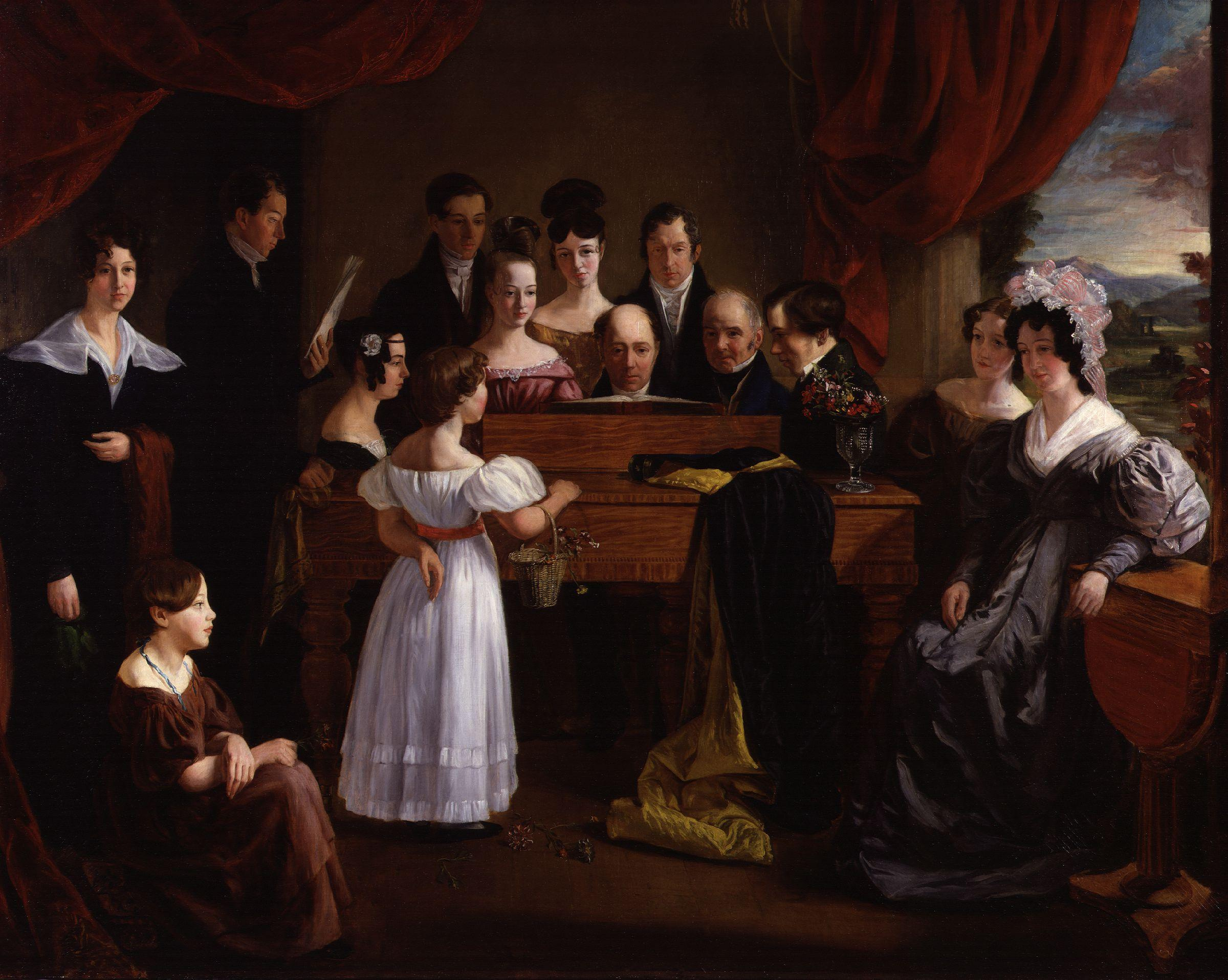
The Novello Family, c. 1830 by Edward Petre Novello. Vincent Novello is seated at the keyboard

Novello and his wife, Mary Sabilla (née Hehl), had eleven children. Five of his daughters survived to adulthood, four of them gifted singers.

- Mary Victoria Cowden Clarke (née Novello) (1809–1898), was a literary scholar and writer. She married the author (and friend of Keats) Charles Cowden Clarke, edited The Musical Times for four years and compiled one of the first concordances of Shakespeare.
- Joseph Alfred Novello (1810–1896), singer, music publisher, founded The Musical Times in 1844, retired in 1866 and sold off his stake in Novello & Co.
- Cecilia Serle (née Novello) (1812-1890) was an actress and singer, a pupil of the singing teacher Mrs. Blaine Hunt. She achieved early success on the stage but retired in 1836 when she married Thomas James Serle, a playwright, actor, novelist, and editor of a London weekly newspaper.
- Edward Petre Novello (1813-1836) showed promise as a painter but died young. He painted the family portrait, The Novello Family around 1830, and a portrait of Clara Novello in 1833. They are now at the National Portrait Gallery.
- Emma Aloysia Novello (1814–c. 1880), painter.
- Sidney Vincent Novello (1816–1820)
- Clara Anastasia Novello (1818–1908), was a soprano, one of the best-known vocalists in opera and oratorio, and on the concert stage, from 1833 onward. In 1843 she married Count Gigliucci, but after a few years returned to her profession, retiring in 1860. Charles Lamb wrote a poem (To Clara N.) in her praise.
- Julia Harriet Novello (born and died 1820)
- Mary Sabilla Novello (1821–1904), singer, teacher of singing and translator.
- Florence Novello (1822- c.1832). In Edward's family portrait The Novello Family, Florence is pictured in a white dress with her back to the viewer
- Charles Arthur Novello (born and died 1824)

== Sources ==
- Hurd, Michael: Vincent Novello and Company (London: Granada, 1981); ISBN 0-246-11733-8
- Clarke, Mary Cowden: The life and labours of Vincent Novello, 1864, Novello & Co.
- Palmer, Fiona M. (December 2006). Vincent Novello (1781–1861): Music for the Masses. Aldershot: Ashgate. p. 242. ISBN 0-7546-3495-7.
