= Novello =

Novello may refer to:

== Places ==
- Novello, Piedmont, a comune in the Province of Cuneo, Italy
- Novello Theatre, a theatre in the City of Westminster, London, England

== People ==
=== Given name ===
- Clara Novello Davies (1861–1943), Welsh singer, named after Clara Novello
- Novello Novelli (1930–2018), Italian character actor

=== Surname ===
- Novello (surname)

== Other uses ==
- Ivor Novello Awards, a British songwriting award
- Novello & Co, an English publisher
- Vino Novello, an Italian wine
