= Georges Douay =

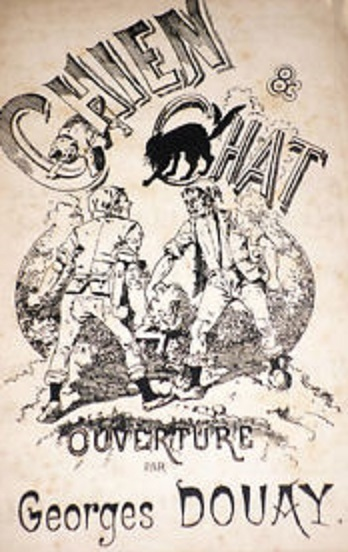
- Chien et Chat, cover page of Georges Douay's operture
- Born: 7 January 1840; Paris
- Died: 18 September 1919 (aged 79); Paris
- Occupations: Composer, collector

Georges Douay (7 January 1840 – 18 September 1919) was a French 19th–20th century composer and collector.

== Biography ==
A trendy composer in the years 1860–1870, he was responsible for numerous songs and music of operettas. At his death, he bequeathed the Bibliothèque de l'Arsenal a rich collection of over 50,000 artifacts on theater, which included printed materials, 700 engravings and 1500 manuscripts. This collection was the origin of the theatrical direction of the establishment.

He wrote more than 400 pieces on texts by Francis Tourte, William Busnach or Alexandre Flan, among others.

== Bibliography ==
- John Denison Champlin, William Foster Apthorp, Cyclopedia of Music and Musicians: Abaco-Dyne, 1893, p. 449
- Frantz Funck-Brentano, Paul Deslandres, La Bibliothèque de l'Arsenal, 1930, p. 26
- Albert Ernest Wier, The Macmillan Encyclopedia of Music and Musicians, T.1, 1938, p. 479
