= Émile Albert =

French composer and pianist (1822–1865)

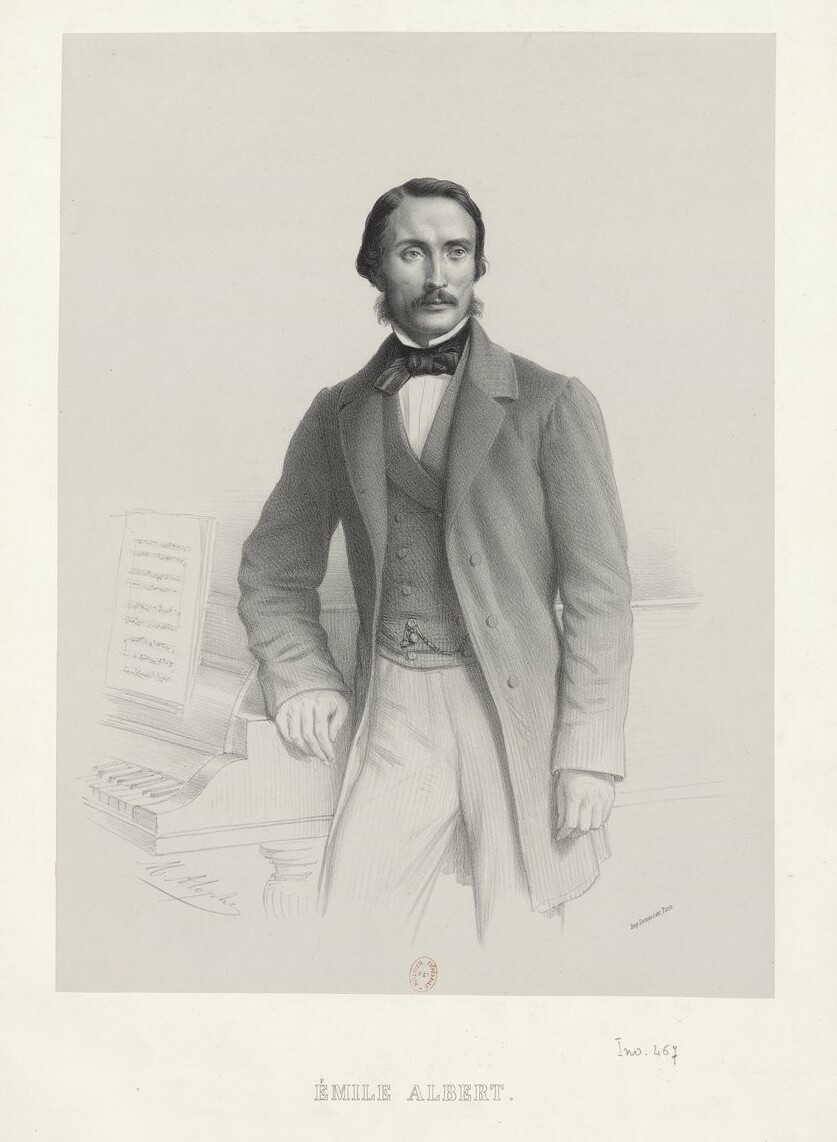
- Portrait of the composer, c. 1865
- Born: Joseph François Émile Albert; 1 January 1822; Montpellier, France
- Died: 17 August 1865 (aged 43); Bagnères-de-Bigorre, France
- Occupations: Composer; pianist

Émile Albert (Joseph François Émile Albert; 1 January 1822 – 17 August 1865) was a French composer and pianist. He was born in Montpellier and died in Bagnères-de-Bigorre.

== Biography ==
Albert was born on 1 January 1822 in Montpellier. He studied in his hometown under the guidance of his father, Narcisse Albert, a piano teacher, before moving to Paris in the late 1840s.

In Paris, Albert gained recognition in 1851 with the publication of numerous piano works, including polkas, mazurkas, impromptus, fantasies, romances without words, a quadrille entitled Les Tout Fous, and a collection of Douze Études, Op. 17.

As a composer, in addition to various piano pieces -among them several études - Albert also wrote a set of six songs, Li Prouvençalo (1853), a collection of motets, Chants du salut pour le mois de Marie [...] avec accompagnement d’orgue (1855), a Cours gradué d’études élémentaires progressives de style et de perfectionnement pour piano (1857), and a Trio de salon with piano (1860). His catalogue comprises around sixty opus numbers.

Albert also composed for the stage. He wrote the opéra bouffe Les Petits du premier, with a libretto by William Busnach, premiered at the Théâtre Saint-Germain on 5 December 1864 and later revived at the Bouffes-Parisiens (premiere on 3 March 1865). The piano-vocal score was published in 1865. He also composed the opera Jean le Fol, first performed in August 1865 at Bagnères-de-Bigorre.

Albert died suddenly in Bagnères-de-Bigorre on 17 August 1865, at the age of forty-three, while overseeing rehearsals for Jean le Fol. He was a member of the Société des compositeurs de musique.

== Bibliography ==
- Kocevar, Érik (2003). "Albert, Joseph François Émile". In Joël-Marie Fauquet (ed.). Dictionnaire de la musique en France au XIXe siècle. Fayard. p. 23. ISBN 2-213-59316-7. BNF 39052242
