= Edward Holmes (musicologist) =

British musicologist (1797–1859)

Edward Holmes (1797 – 28 August 1859) was an English musicologist, music critic, pianist, composer and arranger and music educator.

Born just outside London, Holmes was a pupil of Vincent Novello. He spent his early career earning a living as a piano teacher. In 1828 he visited Germany, in Salzburg delivering a collection of funds from English music lovers to Constanze, widow of Wolfgang Amadeus Mozart, and upon returning to England published his first book, A Ramble among the Musicians of Germany (1828; 3rd ed., 1838). Impressed with his skills as a writer on music, the owner of The Atlas, Robert Bell hired him as a music critic where he remained for many years. Upon the 1836 shooting death of his brother-in-law, noted illustrator Robert Seymour, following a dispute between Seymour and Charles Dickens over The Pickwick Papers, Holmes took in Seymour's widow Jane and their two children.

Also a noted church organist, Holmes composed and published several popular songs including "My Jenny". In 1849 he immigrated alone to the United States where he spent the last ten years of his life working as an editor and music critic. His widow Louisa, who only married him in 1857, was the sister of his late friend, English musicologist Egerton Webbe. Holmes also regularly contributed articles to several music journals during his career, including The Musical Times. His other published works include an arrangement of Mozart's Te Deum, K. 141 in 1844, the biography The Life of Mozart (Chapman and Hall, London, 1845), based on notes and letters of Mozart provided to him by the composer's widow, Life of Purcell for Novello's Sacred Music, and Analytical and Thematic Index of Mozart's Piano-works (1852).
