= Armand Liorat =

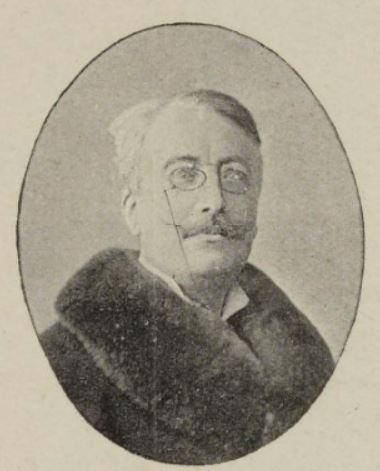

Armand Liorat was the pen name of Georges Degas (10 January 1837 – 8 August 1898), a French playwright and librettist.

== Life and career ==
Liorat was born in Sceaux, Hauts-de-Seine, the son of Pierre André Constant Degas, a lawyer, and his wife Rose Elisabeth Hermance, née Berthault. He entered the civil service in the office of the préfecture of the Seine, and rose to be chief inspector of administrative finance. Away from his official duties he wrote song-lyrics, and sketches for cafés-concerts. For the spoken drama and the opera he adopted the pen name Amand Liorat and, either alone or in collaboration with writers such as William Busnach, Clairville, Paul Bocage, Prével, Ferrier, wrote a large number of operetta librettos.

As well as librettos for the lyric stage, Liorat wrote some serious drama, including La belle aux cheveux d'or (1882) in collaboration with Arthur Arnould.

Liorat died suddenly, shortly before his last work, Les quatre filles Aymon was put into production at the Théâtre des Folies-Dramatiques.

== Librettos ==
Work	Co-author	Composer	Premiere
Un mariage au gros sel, opérette in 1 act		Frédéric Barbier	Eldorado, 10 July 1869
La belle Kalitcha, opérette in 1 act		Frédéric Wachs	Folies-Bergère, December 1872
La rosière d'ici, opéra bouffe in 3 acts		Léon Roques	Bouffes-Parisiens, 27 March 1873
Mariée depuis midi, 1 act "mêlée de chant"	William Busnach	Georges Jacobi	Marseille, 20 August 1873)
La leçon d'amour, opérette in 1 act		Frédéric Wachs	Bouffes-Parisiens, 14 September 1873
La liqueur d'or, opéra comique in 3 acts	William Busnach	Laurent de Rillé	Menus-Plaisirs, 11 December 1873
Une pleine eau à chatou, opérette in 1 act		Frédéric Wachs	Folies-Bergère, 21 November 1874
De bric et de broc, revue in 4 acts	Clairville	Louis Varney	Athénée-Comique, 4 February 1876
Kosiki, opérette in 3 acts	William Busnach	Charles Lecocq	Renaissance, 18 October 1876
Le pont d'Avignon, opérette in 3 acts		Charles Grisart	Bouffes-Parisiens, 3 September 1878
Le petit abbé, musical sketch	Henri Bocage	Charles Grisart	Vaudeville, 9 October 1879)
Les poupées de l'infante, opéra comique in 3 acts	Henri Bocage	Charles Grisart	Folies-Dramatiques, 9 April 1881
La laitière et le pot au lait, pièce in 1 act	William Busnach,	Frédéric Wachs	Palais-Royal, 1 May 1883
Les noces improvisées, opéra comique in 3 acts	Albert Fonteny	Francis Chassaigne	Bouffes-Parisiens, 13 February 1886
L'amour mouillé, opéra comique in 3 acts	Jules Prével,	Louis Varney	Nouveautés, 25 January 1887
Le bossu, opéra comique in 4 acts	Henri Bocage,	Charles Grisart	Gaîté, 19 March 1888
La vénus d'arles, opéra comique in 3 acts	Paul Ferrier	Louis Varney	Nouveautés, 30 January 1889
Ma mie Rosette, opéra comique in 3 acts	Jules Prével	Paul Lacôme	Folies-Dramatiques, 4 February 1890
La fille de l'air, opérette-féerie in 3 acts	Cogniard frères	Paul Lacôme	Folies-Dramatiques, 20 June 1890
La fille de fanchon la vielleuse, opéra comique in 4 acts	William Busnach et Albert Fonteny	Louis Varney	Folies-Dramatiques, 3 November 1891
Le cadeau de noces, opéra bouffe in 4 acts	Stop and Fernand Hue	Paul Lacôme	Bouffes-Parisiens, 20 January 1893)
Le petit bois, opérette in 1 act		Charles Grisart	Bouffes-Parisiens, 7 March 1893
La fille de paillasse, opérette in 3 acts	Louis Leloir,	Louis Varney	Folies-Dramatiques, 20 April 1894
Les petites brebis, opérette in 2 acts		Louis Varney	Théâtre de Cluny, 5 June 1895
La falote, opérette in 3 acts	Maurice Ordonneau	Louis Varney	Folies-Dramatiques, 17 April 1896
Le lézard, pièce in 1 act, mêlée de chant	William Busnach	Frédéric Toulmouche	Scala, 29 August 1896
Inès Mendo, opéra in 3 acts	Pierre Decourcelle	Frédéric d'Erlanger	Royal Opera House, London, 10 July 1897
Les quatre filles Aymon, opérette in 3 acts	Albert Fonteny	Paul Lacôme and Victor Roger	Folies-Dramatiques, 20 September 1898

Source: Encyclopédie de l'art lyrique français.
