= Charles Cowden Clarke =

English author (1787–1877)

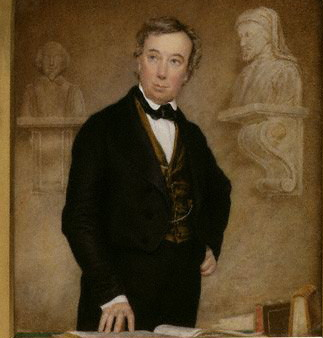
- Portrait of Charles Cowden Clarke, c. 1840
- Born: Charles Cowden Clarke; 15 December 1787; Enfield, England
- Died: 13 March 1877 (aged 89); Genoa, Italy
- Occupation: Author
- Spouse: Mary Victoria Novello (m. 1828)

Signature
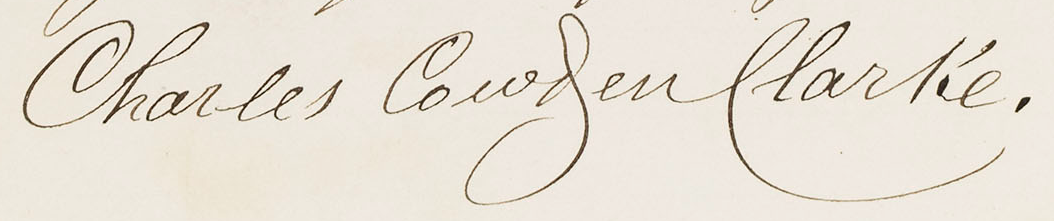

Charles Cowden Clarke (15 December 1787 – 13 March 1877) was an English writer who was best known for his books on Shakespeare. He was also known for his compilation of poems as well as his edition of The Canterbury Tales, which was rendered into prose and widely used.

== Early life and education ==
Charles Cowden Clarke's father, John Clarke, was the headmaster at his own academy in Enfield Town, among whose pupils was John Keats. Charles Cowden Clarke taught Keats his letters and encouraged his love of poetry. He knew Charles and Mary Lamb, and afterwards became acquainted with Shelley, Leigh Hunt, Coleridge, Hazlitt, Felix Mendelssohn, William Macready, Charles Dickens, Douglas Jerrold, and William Godwin. Cowden Clarke became a music publisher in partnership with Alfred Novello, and married in 1828 his partner's sister, Mary Victoria (1809–1898), the eldest daughter of Vincent Novello, who was to become known for her Concordance to Shakespeare, a work that she began in the year following their marriage.

== Career ==
Cowden Clarke published many useful books, and edited the text for John Nichol's edition of the British poets. His most important work consisted of lectures delivered between 1834 and 1856 on Shakespeare and other literary subjects. Some of the more notable series were published, among them being Shakespeare's Characters, chiefly those subordinate (1863), and Molière's Characters (1865). In 1859 he published a volume of original poems, Carmina Minima.

In 1832, the cricketer John Nyren began a collaboration with Cowden Clarke, who recorded Nyren's reminiscences of the Hambledon era and published them serially in a periodical called The Town. The following year, the series of articles appeared as The Cricketers of My Time as part of an instructional book entitled The Young Cricketer's Tutor. It became a major source for the history and personalities of Georgian cricket and also came to be regarded as the first classic in cricket's now rich literary history.

For some years after their marriage the Cowden Clarkes lived with the Novellos in London. In 1849 Vincent Novello with his wife moved to Nice, where he was joined by the Cowden Clarkes in 1856. After his death they lived at Genoa at the "Villa Novello." They collaborated in The Shakespeare Key, unlocking the Treasures of his Style ... (1879), and in an edition of Shakespeare for Messrs Cassell, which was issued in weekly parts, and completed in 1868. It was reissued in 1886 as Cassell's Illustrated Shakespeare. Charles Cowden Clarke died at Genoa, and his wife survived him until 12 January 1898. Among Mrs. Cowden Clarke's other works may be mentioned The Girlhood of Shakespeare's Heroines (3 vols., 1850–1852), and a translation of Hector Berlioz's Treatise upon Modern Instrumentation and Orchestration (1856).

See Recollections of Writers (1878), a joint work by the Cowden Clarkes containing letters and reminiscences of their many literary friends; and Mary Cowden Clarke's autobiography, My Long Life (1896). A charming series of letters (1850–1861), addressed by her to an American admirer of her work, Robert Balmanno, was edited by Anne Upton Nettleton as Letters to an Enthusiast (Chicago, 1902).

== Selected works ==
- Tales from Chaucer (1833)
- Adam, the Gardener (1834)
- Carmina Minima (1859)
- "Many Happy Returns of the Day!" A Birth-Day Book (co-written, 1860)
- Shakespeare-Characters, Chiefly Those Subordinate (1863)
- Molière-Characters (1865)
- Recollections of Writers (co-written, 1878)
- The Shakespeare Key (co-written, 1879)
