= Ma mie Rosette =

Opéra comique by Paul Lacôme

Cover of vocal score, 1890

Ma mie Rosette ("My Dear Rosette") is an opéra comique in four acts with music by Paul Lacôme and words by Jules Prével and Armand Liorat. It is set in 16th-century Navarre, ruled by the young and famously amorous Henri of Navarre. His acceptance of refreshment from Rosette, a young woman on a farm, provokes jealousy in her fiancé. The young couple are brought to Henri's court, where they are married and raised to the aristocracy. The King's attentions to Rosette provoke a furious response from her husband. All the events at court turn out to be a dream of the sleeping Rosette. She wakes on her father's farm in time to receive the King who brings her a generous dowry.

The opera was first performed at the Théâtre des Folies-Dramatiques, Paris, on 4 February 1890. It made little impact in Paris and closed the next month, but an English version in two acts presented in London in 1892, and subsequently around Britain and in Australia and New Zealand, was considerably more successful. That version, adapted by the librettist George Dance, included additional numbers with music by Ivan Caryll.

== Background and original production ==
Lacôme had written eight full-length opérettes and opéras comiques for Paris theatres between 1873 and 1890, none of them breaking box-office records, but some, such as Jeanne, Jeannette et Jeanneton (1876), described as "decidedly successful" by the authors of Les Annales du théâtre et de la musique. He had worked with some of France's leading librettists, including Clairville, Albert Vanloo and Eugène Leterrier, but this was his first collaboration with either of the co-authors of the libretto of Ma mie Rosette. Jules Prével died before the opera was produced; Armand Liorat and Lacôme went on to work on three more operas together.

The title role of Rosette was played by Juliette Nesville in her operatic debut. She had been at school in England and then attended the Conservatoire de Paris, where she had caught the attention of Sarah Bernhardt, who cast her as the page in Jules Barbier's Jeanne d'Arc. From this small role she moved to star five weeks later in Ma mie Rosette.

The production opened on 4 February 1890, and ran for 41 performances.

== Original cast ==
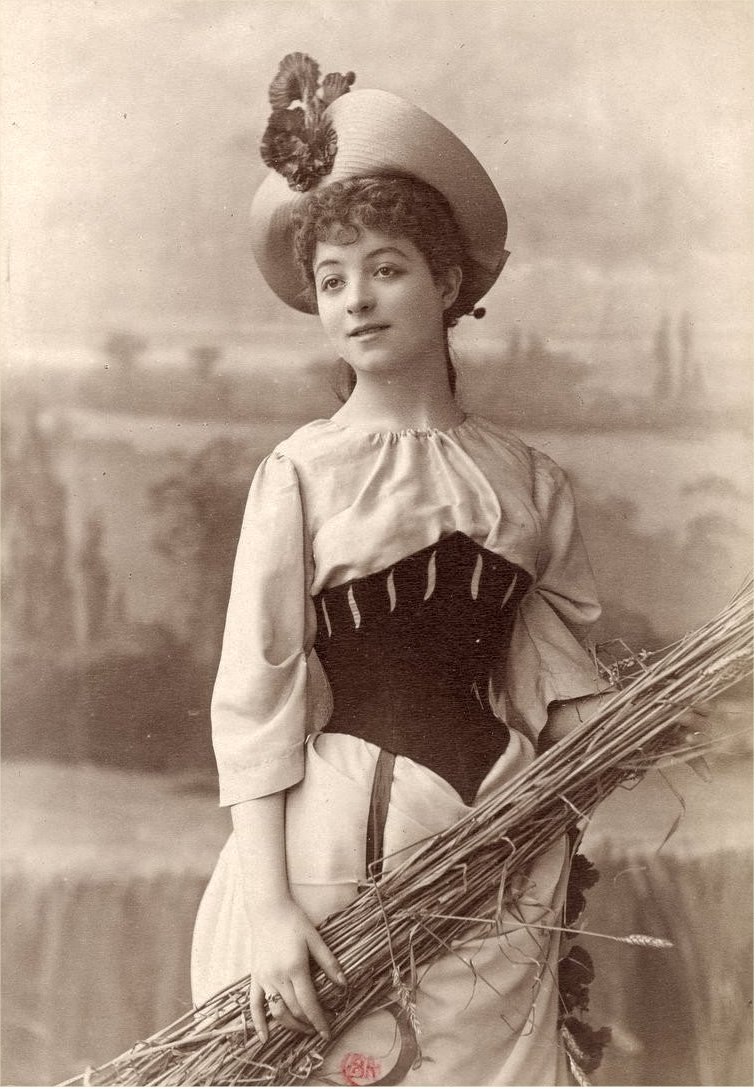
Juliette Nesville as Rosette, 1890

- Vincent – M. Gobin
- Henriot – M. Hugert
- Frétillac – M. Vandennes
- Moustajon – M. Bellucci
- Allain – M. Larroque
- Ségurd – M. Dauteuil
- Lacoste – M. Fournier
- Rosette – Juliette Nesville
- Corisandre – Mdlle. Vernon
- Gisele – Mdlle. Thirion
- Nicette – Mdlle. Montbars
- Clochette – Mdlle. Germaine

== Synopsis ==
The action takes place in 1579.

On a farm near Nérac in the kingdom of Navarre in what is now south-west France harvesters are hard at work finishing their labours. The last load of corn is brought home and everyone is looking forward to the forthcoming wedding of Rosette and Vincent. The King, Henri of Navarre, is hunting in the neighbourhood and stops to refresh himself at the farm. Rosette hands him a cup of milk. Henri, notoriously susceptible to female beauty, rewards her with a kiss and bids her bring more milk to his residence, the Château de Nérac. After he leaves, Rosette and Vincent, fatigued after their day's labours, fall asleep close to each other on sheaves of corn.

The King brings Rosette and Vincent to his court, creates the latter a Marquis and hosts their wedding ceremony. Immediately after the service Henri sends Vincent away on a distant mission leaving the way clear for him to try to seduce Rosette. Corisandre, the King's mistress, jealous of her potential rival, sends a message to warn Vincent, who, surprising the King and Rosette together, challenges the King in no uncertain terms. As events move towards a calamitous climax the drama stops and the scene changes to the farm, where Rosette wakes up: all the events at the King's court were in her dreams, and she and Vincent are still on her father's farm. King Henri returns to bless the marriage and gives her a handsome dowry.

== Numbers ==
- Act 1
  - Overture
  - Chorus of harvesters – Hardi, moissonneurs! du courage (Bold reapers! Courage!)
  - Duet (Rosette, Vincent) – Nous allons entrer en ménage (We will enter the household)
  - Couplets (Rosette) – Il sera roi (He will be king)
  - Entrance of the King – Vive le Roi! (Long live the king!)
  - Chanson française (Henri) – Le plus sensible hommage (The most sensitive tribute)
  - Couplets (Rosette) – Du logis humble ménagère (The humble housewife)
  - Exit (Chorus) – Accueillez notre hommage (Accept our tribute)
  - Finale (Vincent, Rosette) – Dormons gentiment, ma Rosette (Sleep softly, my Rosette)
- Act 2
  - Entr'acte
  - Chorus – De la Navarre (From Navarre)
  - Rondo (Frétillac) – Fier de ma prérogative (Proud of my rights)
  - Ensemble – Vers nous elle daigne se rendre (To us she deigns to surrender)
  - Chorus – J'ai la migraine (I have a migraine )
  - Rondo (Rosette) – Dieu! que c'est beau! (God! how beautiful!)
  - Song (Henri) – Ma mie Rosette (My dear Rosette)
  - Crowing couplets (Vincent) – Y a rien d'pus gai, y a rien d'pus drôle (There is nothing gayer, nothing funnier)
  - Chorus – Ma mie Rosette, soyez la bienvenue ici (My dear Rosette, welcome here)
  - Song of the children of Gascony (Henri, Rosette, Vincent) – De la terre gasconne (From the Gascon land )
- Act 3
  - Entr'acte
  - Chorus – De sa robe blanche habillée (In her white dress)
  - Couplet (Henri) – Marquise, vous voici chez vous (Marquise, here you are at home)
  - Exit (Chorus) – Au seuil de ce discret domaine (At the threshold of this private area)
  - Ensemble (Vincent, Frétillac, Chorus) – Salut, honneur au nouveau dignitaire! (Hail, honour to the new dignitary!)
  - Idylle (Vincent) – Dès ma plus frêle adolescence (From my frail youth)
  - Rcmance (Rosette) – O chère image! (O beloved image!)
  - Duet (Henri, Rosette) – Ne t'effarouche pas (Do not be frightened)
  - Finale – Quelle démence! Quelle témérité! (What madness! What temerity!)
- Act 4
  - Entr'acte
  - Chorus (Chanson béarnaise) – Quand viendra l'aube nouvelle (When will the new dawn come)
  - Couplet finale (Henri, Vincent, Rosette, Chorus) – Monarque populaire (Popular Monarch)

== Critical response ==
The composer fared better than his librettists. The critical consensus was that the device of a plot that turns out to be a dream was hackneyed and feeble. The score attracted more favourable comment, although the critics evinced judicious approval rather than wild enthusiasm. There was praise for the staging and the performances of the leading players.

== London production ==
The London version opened at the Globe Theatre on 17 November 1892 and transferred to the Prince of Wales Theatre on 26 December, where it ran until 28 February 1893.

It was quite usual for the librettos of French operettas to be heavily adapted for English productions. Audiences in London were less broad-minded than those in Paris, and French plots had to be purged of the more conspicuous sexual elements. The London version of Ma mie Rosette required minor changes in that regard; the English text was by George Dance, a young writer whose only major theatrical work before that had been as co-librettist of The Nautch Girl in 1891. The English version differed from most French imports in two ways: nearly half the numbers were new, composed by Ivan Caryll, the conductor of the production; and the piece was considerably more successful in London and the British provinces than it had been in Paris. There remained points in common between the original and the revised versions: Lacôme travelled from Paris to supervise rehearsals, and the leading lady in London, as in Paris, was Juliette Nesville.

The number of acts was cut from four to two, but the main plot was altered only slightly. Henri's interest in Rosette is sparked in the London version not by his roving eye but by his recognising her as a playmate from his childhood. Rosette's dream takes place not after falling asleep close to her lover, but during a fainting fit caused by her shock at his volunteering for the army. A comic element was introduced in the form of two new characters: Bouillon, a valet, poses as a nobleman to win Martha, who pretends to be a rural ingénue, but has really buried two husbands already.

A George Edwardes company took the piece to Australia where it opened at the Lyceum in Sydney, in November 1895. The work was played in New Zealand in the same year. The first British production outside London was staged by Robert Courtneidge at the Prince's Theatre, Manchester, in April 1899, and then on tour throughout the rest of that year.

=== Cast: London version ===
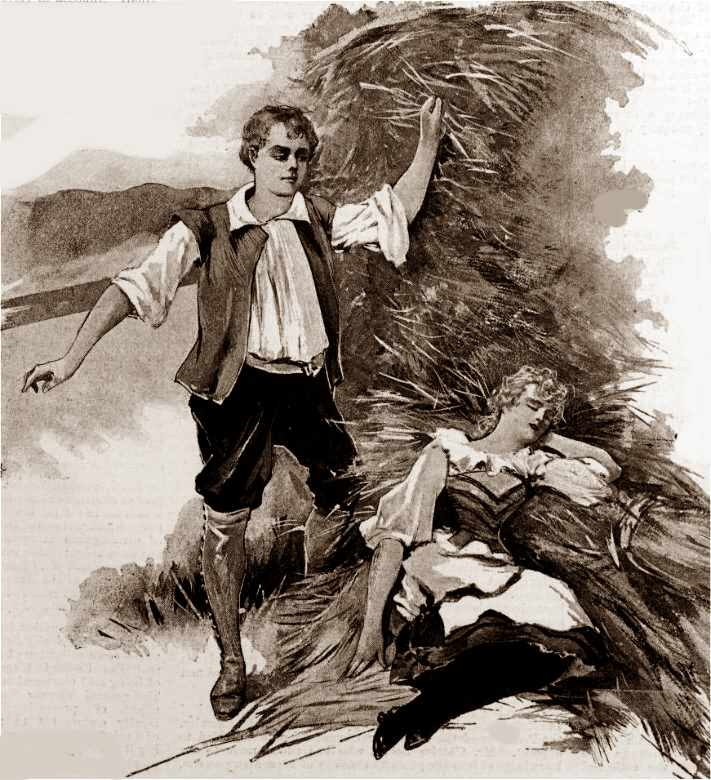
Courtice Pounds as Vincent and Juliette Nesville as Rosette, London 1892

- King Henri – Eugène Oudin
- Colonel Cognac – Lawrance D'Orsay
- Bouillon – Frank Wyatt
- Segur – R. Scott Fishe
- Winyar – W. Rolph
- Moustajon – Cairns James
- Vincent – Courtice Pounds
- Corisandre – Jennie McNulty
- Martha – Jessie Bond
- Clochette – Marie Brooke
- Therese – Florence Melville
- Nichette – Day Ford
- Petan – Blanche Winter
- Alphonse – Rita Paton
- Rosette – Juliette Nesville

=== Synopsis: London version ===
The magazine The Ludgate Monthly, published in London, printed this summary of the plot of the London version in 1892:

The rising of the curtain discloses a farmhouse scene – harvesters hard at work finishing their labours; the last load of corn expected home, and the nuptials of Rosette and Vincent about to be celebrated. The King, Henri of Navarre, happens to be hunting in the neighbourhood and stops to refresh himself at the village inn. Rosette hands him a bowl of milk the King, recognising in her his little playmate and sweetheart of younger days, invites her to his chateau. Vincent is jealous and offers himself as a soldier, and Rosette swoons away. Rosette dreams a dream, and Scene 1 of Act ii shows us her dream: How the King gives a grand ball in her honour, creates her a Marquise, and loads her with jewels and honours; her lover, who has gained renown in the wars, returns, but is hurried away by the King to leave his path clear. Corisandre, another love of the King's, jealous of her rival, informs Vincent, who, surprising the King and Rosette, challenges the King. Scene 2, Act ii finds us where Act i. left us. Vincent has just been accepted as a soldier and is supporting Rosette, who has swooned away. She begs him not to go to the wars on account of her dream; he asks the King to release him from his newly acquired duties and give him permission to return to his gardener's toil. This, His Majesty grants, blesses the happy and blushing pair – tableau, curtain.

=== Numbers: London version ===
Music by Lacôme except where Caryll's name is shown.

- Act 1
  - Overture
  - Chorus of Reapers – Hurrah! Work with spirit, friends and neighbours
  - Duet (Rosette and Vincent) – Tomorrow morning, my true love and I will united be
  - Romance (Rosette) – He was a curly headed boy (Caryll)
  - Intermezzo
  - Chorus and Song (King Henri) – Long live the King! I am a man of fashion
  - Duet (Rosette and Henri) – Noble sire, kneeling at your feet
  - Duet (Martha and Bouillon) – Supposing a stranger to you spoke of love (Caryll)
  - Song (Henri) – Ma mie Rosette, ma mie Rosette
  - Duet (Rosette and Vincent) – Why so sad, darling mine
  - Ballad (Vincent) – Think not that I could take the hand who cannot win the heart (Caryll)
  - Finale Act I – When I, my love, am far away (Caryll)
- Act 2
  - Introduction
  - Chorus, with soloists – Lucky the maiden who stirs a chord in Henri's breast
  - Rondeau (Rosette) – 'Midst all the beauty and grandeur around me
  - Ballad (Henri) – Why throbs this longing heart of mine? (Caryll)
  - Duet (Martha and Bouillon) – Here's an instance (Caryll)
  - Dance (Caryll)
  - Chorus – See, la belle Rosette is approaching
  - Scene (Henri, Rosette, Corisandre and Chorus) – Prithee, prithee pretty maiden (Caryll)
  - Duet (Henri and Rosette) – Hush'd is the busy world
  - Chorus – What is this clatter?
  - Finale – Rosette, Rosette, my mie Rosette (Caryll)

=== Critical reception: London version ===
The Times was unimpressed by Ma mie Rosette, complaining that once again "a French work has been tricked out afresh for the English market … presented to a public sated with things of the same in all directions." The St James's Gazette found Lâcome's score so charming that it was regrettable that the producers had thought fit to introduce Carryl's interpolations. The Pall Mall Gazette thought the piece "head and shoulders above anything" in London productions of recent times, the theme almost worthy of Goethe with a soupçon of genuine comedy". The Theatre's reviewer considered the piece "at once the best-mounted, best-acted, most dramatic musical play seen since The Yeomen of the Guard".

== References and sources ==
=== Sources ===
- Noël, Edouard; Edmond Stoullig (1877). Les annales du théâtre et de la musique: 1876 (in French). Paris: G. Charpentier. OCLC 491464809.
- Noël, Edouard; Edmond Stoullig (1891). Les annales du théâtre et de la musique: 1890 (in French). Paris: G. Charpentier. OCLC 762327066.
- Traubner, Richard (2016). Operetta: A Theatrical History. London: Routledge. ISBN 978-1-138-13892-6.
