= The Musical Times =

Academic journal of classical music in the United Kingdom

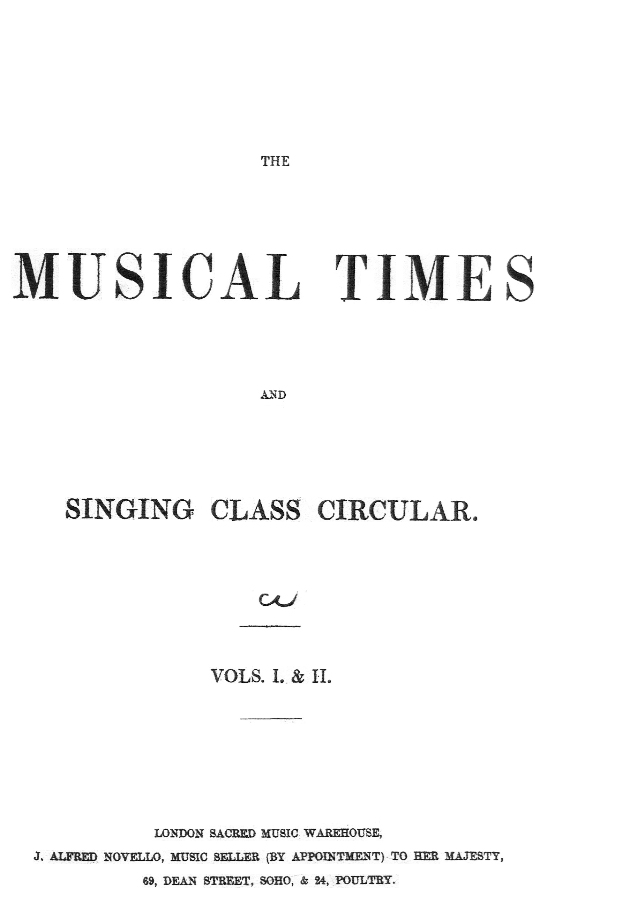
- The Musical Times 1848
- Discipline: Classical music
- Language: English
- Edited by: Antony Bye

Publication details
- Former names: The Musical Times and Singing Class Circular; Mainzer's Musical Times and Singing Circular
- History: 1842–2024
- Publisher: Musical Times Publications (United Kingdom)
- Frequency: Quarterly

Standard abbreviations
- ISO 4: Music. Times

Indexing
- ISSN: 0027-4666
- LCCN: 54000525
- JSTOR: 00274666
- OCLC no.: 53165808

Links
- Journal homepage

The Musical Times was an academic journal of classical music edited and produced in the United Kingdom. It stood as the world's oldest continuously issued music magazine until it ceased publication in the winter of 2024.

== Publication history ==
The magazine was originally created by Joseph Mainzer in 1842 as Mainzer's Musical Times and Singing Circular, but in 1844 he sold it to Alfred Novello (who also founded The Musical World in 1836), and it was published monthly by Novello and Co. (also owned by Alfred Novello at the time). It first appeared as The Musical Times and Singing Class Circular, a name which was retained until 1903. From the very beginning, every issue – initially just eight pages – contained a simple piece of choral music (alternating secular and sacred), which choral society members subscribed to collectively for the sake of the music.

Its title was shortened to its present name from January 1904. Even during World War II it continued to be published regularly, making it the world's oldest continuously published periodical devoted to western classical music. In 1947 a two-volume compilation of material from the first 100 years of the magazine, edited by Percy Scholes, was published.

The journal originally appeared monthly but became a quarterly publication in 2004. It is available online at JSTOR and RILM Abstracts of Music Literature Full Text.

The Winter 2024 edition was prefaced by a "Special Announcement", stating that the journal was ceasing publication "for the foreseeable future."

== Victorian era ==
Controlled by the Novello publishing house, the magazine was aimed squarely at organists, choirmasters, and amateur choral singers, and its initial purpose was practical: promoting affordable sheet music for the masses. Founding editor J. Alfred Novello (1844–1853, 1856–1863) championed accessible sacred music and church repertoire, hoping to improve the standard of choral singing in places of worship. He briefly handed the reins to his sister, Mary Cowden Clarke (1853–1856), who broadened the journal's literary connections. Cowden Clarke wrote a long series of articles called 'Music among the Poets', and induced her literary friend Leigh Hunt to contribute.

It wasn't until Henry Charles Lunn (1863–1887) took charge that the periodical began to look more like a modern, independent music magazine. Lunn expanded the number of pages in each issue and helped establish the publication's critical authority. He was particularly known for his coverage of provincial festivals. William Alexander Barrett (1887–1891, also chief music critic of the Morning Post) and music critic Edgar Frederick Jacques (1892–1897) guided the journal into a more formal era of critical review, while also entrenching it more deeply in the organ world. Barrett was an organist and composer, while Frederick George Edwards (1897–1909) was a formally trained organist, serving at several major London metropolitan churches. Edwards used the pseudonym "Dotted Crotchet" to write "educationally suggestive interviews with musical celebrities", as well as a many articles about "cathedrals, churches, and educational institutions". He elevated the magazine's historical research and established a reputation for reliable obituaries and biographical documentation.

== 20th and 21st centuries ==
William Gray McNaught (1909–1918) steered the publication through World War I, laying the foundation for one the journal's longest-serving editors, Harvey Grace (1918, until his death in 1944). Under Grace The Musical Times began to take more of an interest in contemporary music. Grace's pen name was 'Feste'. After him, W.G. McNaught's son William McNaught (1944–1953) took up the editorial chair. The mid-century saw a rapid succession of editors more centrally involved in new musical developments, including Martin Cooper (1953–1956), Harold Rutland (1957–1960), Robin Hull (1960) and Andrew Porter (1960–1967). They fostered a more international perspective and introduced modern critical approaches.

In 1967, Stanley Sadie (1967–1987) took the helm, transforming the publication into a globally respected journal. The magazine flourished for the next twenty years, but by the 1990s it was struggling to survive, caught between its origins as a general interest publication available from newsagents and as an academic journal more at home in libraries and universities. The decision was made to shift to quarterly publication in 2004. Antony Bye assumed ownership and editorship in 1992. He announced his retirement in late 2024, after which publication ceased.

== Editors ==
- Joseph Alfred Novello (1844–1853 and 1856–1863)
- Mary Cowden Clarke (1853–1856)
- Henry Charles Lunn (1863–1887)
- William Alexander Barrett (1887–1891
- Edgar Frederick Jacques (1892–1897)
- Frederick George Edwards (1897–1909)
- William Gray McNaught (1909–1918)
- Harvey Grace (1918–1944)
- William McNaught (1944–1953)
- Martin Cooper (1953–1956)
- Harold Rutland (1957–1960)
- Robin Hull (1960)
- Andrew Porter (1960–1967).
- Stanley Sadie (1967–1987)
- Alison Latham (1977–1988)
- Andrew Clements(1987–1988)
- Eric Wen (1988–1990)
- Basil Ramsey (1990–1992)
- Antony Bye (1992–2024)
