= Bill Novelli =

American public relations executive, author, and educator

William D. Novelli (born May 21, 1941) is an American executive, public relations professional, author and educator. He was born in Bridgeville, Pennsylvania. He is currently Distinguished Professor of the Practice at the McDonough School of Business of Georgetown University in Washington, D.C., where he teaches in the MBA program and founded the Georgetown Business for Impact center. He is also the co-chair of the Coalition to Transform Advanced Care (C-TAC), an organization he co-founded in 2009 to improve advanced illness and end-of-life care in the U.S. He earlier co-founded Porter-Novelli, today a global public relations firm. Prior to joining the faculty at Georgetown in 2009, Novelli was the CEO of AARP (from 2001 to 2009). He has been influential in American politics, especially in issues related to health and health care.

== Education ==
Novelli earned a Bachelor of Arts degree at the University of Pennsylvania, a Master of Arts at the Annenberg School for Communication at the University of Pennsylvania, and a PhD at New York University. He is of Italian descent.

== Career ==
Novelli began his career at Unilever, marketing consumer products, before joining the New York ad agency Wells, Rich, Greene, and then the Peace Corps in 1970. There he met Jack Porter, with whom he would later form Porter Novelli.

Novelli left the Peace Corps in 1972 to briefly join the "November Group" in the Nixon White House, forming Porter Novelli later that year.

In 1981 they merged Porter Novelli into Needham, Harper Worldwide, and in 1986 the company combined with Doyle Dane Bernbach and BBDO to form Omnicom, a global holding company of marketing communications agencies.

Novelli left Porter Novelli in 1990 to resume his career in public service, becoming Chief Operating Officer of CARE USA (part of CARE International). He was involved in CARE's activities in a number of emergencies (including the Rwandan and Somalia genocides) as well as development activities in Latin America, Africa and Asia.

Novelli left CARE in 1995 to found the Campaign for Tobacco-Free Kids, a program to discourage youth tobacco smoking in the U.S., with support from the Robert Wood Johnson Foundation (RWJF) and partnerships with the American Cancer Society, the American Heart Association and other public health organizations. He stepped down as president in 1999 to join AARP, but he continued to serve on the Board of Directors, currently as chairman.

Novelli became CEO of AARP in 2001. During his time leading the organization it expanded internationally and gained five million members. He took a key role in passage of the Older Americans Act and was a leader of the "Divided We Fail" coalition, which lobbied the Obama administration for health care reform. He also expanded AARP's Global Aging Program, hosting a Reinventing Retirement conference in London, publishing a Global Report on Aging and participating in the World Economic Forum in Davos, Switzerland .

In 2009 Novelli left AARP to cofound the Coalition to Transform Advanced Care (C-TAC) with Tom Koutsoumpas. C-TAC is a national organization dedicated to reforming advanced illness and end of life care by empowering consumers, changing the healthcare delivery system, improving public policies, and enhancing provider capacity. He currently co-charis the organization.

In 2017, Novelli was appointed to the board of directors of the American Cancer Society. He also sits on the boards of the Bipartisan Policy Center's Advocacy Network and Capital Caring. He co-chairs the Culture & Inclusiveness Action Collaborative of the National Academy of Medicine and served on NAM committees on The Future of Nursing: Leading Change, Advancing Health and Dying in America: Improving Quality and Honoring Individual Preferences Near the End of Life. He is also co-chair of the advisory board of the Medical Consortium on Climate and Health.

== Academic Positions ==
While at Porter Novelli, Novelli taught Marketing Management and Health Communications courses in the MBA program at the University of Maryland.

In 2009 Novelli joined the faculty at Georgetown University's McDonough School of Business as a Distinguished Professor of the Practice. He currently teaches courses on Ethical Leadership and Managing the Enterprise in the MBA program, after having developed and taught courses in Corporate Social Responsibility and Leadership and Management of Nonprofit Organizations. He founded Georgetown Business for Impact at McDonough and oversees the program, which partners with companies, nonprofits and government to create social, environmental and economic impact.

== Publications ==
Novelli is the author of the books Fifty Plus: Give Meaning and Purpose to the Best Time of Your Life (with Boe Workman, St. Martin's Press, 2007) and Managing the Older Worker: How to Prepare for the New Organizational Order (with Peter Cappelli, Harvard University Press, 2010), as well as Good Business: The Talk, Fight, Win Way to Change the World (Johns Hopkins University Press, 2021).

Novelli was co-editor of A Roadmap for Success: Transforming Advanced Illness Care in America (with Boe Workman and Tom Koutsoumpas, C-TAC, 2015).

== Honors and awards ==
Among the honors and recognition Novelli has received are the 2003 Porter Prize from the University of Pittsburgh Graduate School of Public Health, the 2007 J. Rhodes Haverty Award and Lecture at Georgia State University, the 2008 David H. Solomon Memorial Public Service Award and Lecture at the American Geriatrics Society, the 2005 Dorothy M. Brown Leadership Award at Georgetown University's School for Continuing Studies, the Public Relations Society of America's 2005 Lloyd Dennis Award for Distinguished Leadership in Public Affairs, the Ellis Island 2007 Family Heritage Award, the 2008 Joseph Wharton Award from the Wharton Club of Washington D.C., the 2007 National Italian American Foundation Special Achievement Award for Public Advocacy, the 2008 President's Award for Excellence from the March of Dimes, and the 2017 Passion for Caring Award from Capital Caring Health.
