= Porter Novelli =

American public relations firm

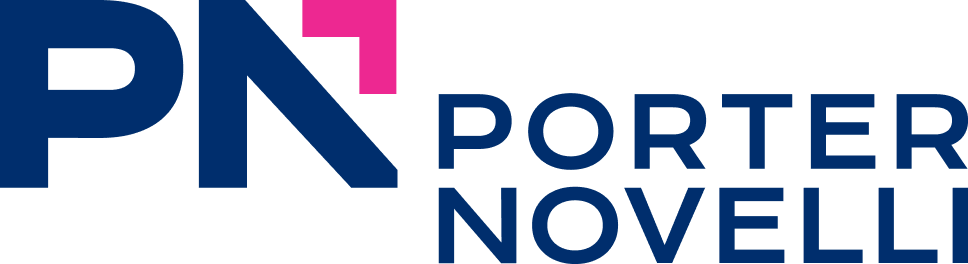
- Industry: Public relations
- Founded: 1972; 54 years ago in Washington, D.C., United States
- Founders: Bill Novelli; Jack Porter; Mike Carberry; Robert T. Druckenmiller
- Headquarters: New York City, U.S.
- Number of locations: 35 (2017)
- Area served: Worldwide
- Key people: Jillian Janaczek (CEO)
- Number of employees: 720 (2017)
- Parent: Omnicom Group
- Subsidiaries: Cone Communications; Voce Communications
- Website: www.porternovelli.com

Porter Novelli is a public relations firm, part of Omnicom Group. The company has 35 owned offices and clients in 60 countries.

The firm was founded in Washington, D.C., in 1972 by Bill Novelli and Jack Porter. Its first major client was the National Institutes of Health. Omnicom Group acquired Porter Novelli in 1988. Historically, most of the company's revenue has come from the information technology and pharmaceutical sectors. In the 2010s, Porter Novelli acquired both Voce Communications and Cone Communications. In 2018, the firm launched a "purpose practice" for organizations focused on corporate social responsibility. Past notable campaigns include an HIV prevention campaign for the Centers for Disease Control, the USDA MyPyramid food guidance system, and the M&M's Global Color Vote.

== History ==
The firm was founded in Washington, D.C., in 1972 by Bill Novelli and Jack Porter, advertising executives, who worked together to market the Peace Corps. The company's first major client was the National Institutes of Health, for whom they created the National High Blood Pressure Education Program.

In 1981, an advertising agency in Chicago called Needham Harper Steers acquired Porter Novelli, turning the agency into Needham Porter Novelli, with offices in additional cities. Needham merged with Omnicom in 1988, at which point Porter Novelli expanded internationally. The firm established Porter Novelli International in 1996, partnering with UK firm Countrywide Communications Group, another Omnicom agency.

Helen Ostrowski became CEO of the company in 2001, the first female CEO of a top 10 PR firm; she served in that role until 2008. In 2006 most of the company's revenue came from the Information technology sector, followed by the pharmaceutical sector. The company formed a new business unit in 2006 dedicated specifically to the biotechnology industry. From 1988 to 2016, Hewlett-Packard was a major client of the firm, including when Hewlett-Packard split into HP Inc. and Hewlett Packard Enterprise in 2015.

The company created a Jack + Bill "popup agency" in September 2008 led by eight younger Porter Novelli employees. In 2008 several senior managers left along with Ostrowski, and Gary Stockman was made CEO.

In 2011, Porter Novelli acquired Silicon Valley–based Voce Communications. That same year, several senior executives left the firm, including its global digital director, director of global health and regulatory affairs, executive VP for strategic planning and research, senior VP for global digital and PR and its executive VPs for global content director and social media. Departures continued in 2012 with departures of Stockman, the CFO, the chief marketing officer, and the president. Karen van Bergen was selected as the new CEO in December 2012. In November 2013, the Navy Federal Credit Union filed a complaint against the firm in the San Diego County Superior Court to collect payment on a contract. Brad MacAfee then became CEO in February 2016, when van Bergen rose to the role of CEO of parent Omnicom Public Relations Group. David Bentley became the CEO in March 2020, replacing Brad MacAfee.

In 2017, Omnicom shifted Cone Communications under Porter Novelli, although Cone retains its separate brand. In 2018, Porter Novelli launched a "purpose practice" for organizations focused on corporate social responsibility. The company has also researched how advertising that features a brand's purpose affects consumer perception.

In 2022, the firm co-published research with the National Center on Birth Defects and Developmental Disability and the Oak Ridge Institute of Science and Education, studying the use of a paid digital marketing campaign to promote a mobile childhood developmental tracking application.

Jillian Janaczek, formerly of Burson Cohn & Wolfe, became CEO in August 2023, following David Bentley's departure in June 2023.

=== House investigation ===
Between 2017 and 2020, Porter Novelli earned more than $5 million in taxpayer funds to promote the public profile of Centers for Medicare & Medicaid Services (CMS) Administrator Seema Verma, a Trump administration official. In September 2020 the House Committee on Oversight and Reform released a report outlining how Porter Novelli used taxpayer funds to promote Verma, and detailing how Porter Novelli shuffled money to private Republican political operators including Nahigian Strategies, Pam Stevens, and nearly two dozen other Republican contractors. The committee stated that CMS "potentially" violated the law by directing taxpayer funds.

== Notable campaigns ==
Porter Novelli has received attention for campaigns including an HIV prevention campaign for the Centers for Disease Control, the USDA MyPyramid food guidance system, the M&M's Global Color Vote, and the Almond Board of California's "Carpe PM" campaign. In 1998, the firm launched Florida's anti-tobacco "Truth" campaign, which expanded nationally two years later. The National Heart, Lung, and Blood Institute in 2009 gave the firm a three-year contract to support its "Learn More Breathe Better" campaign for chronic obstructive pulmonary disease awareness. In 2015, Porter Novelli helped facilitate the Ice Bucket Challenge with the ALS Association, and guided the campaign to receive more national and international media attention.

Porter Novelli was hired by the Indiana Economic Development Corporation, designated with the task to attract businesses to the state, to rebrand Indiana's image after backlash from the Religious Freedom Restoration Act signed into law in March 2015. The state considered eight other firms before selecting Porter Novelli. The state rejected Porter Novelli's suggestions of sponsoring the Silicon Valley Pride Festival or content in Pride Magazine. The firm was fired after only three months.
