= Paul Lacôme =

French composer (1838–1920)

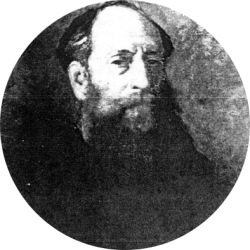

Paul-Jean-Jacques Lacôme d'Estalenx (4 March 1838 – 12 December 1920) was a French composer. Between 1870 and the turn of the century he produced a series of operettas and operas-bouffes that were popular both in France and abroad. Interest in his works revived briefly during the First World War, when they were successfully revived in Paris.

== Biography ==
Lacôme was born in Le Houga, Gers, in Gascony, the only child of an artistic and musical family. He became a competent player of the piano, flute, cornet, cello and ophicleide, and studied with the organist José Puig y Absubide in Aire-sur-Adour between 1857 and 1860. He won a prize, in a magazine competition, with an operetta, Le dernier des paladins, which was to have been presented at the Théâtre des Bouffes Parisiens, but the policy of the theatre changed and the piece was not staged.

Lacôme settled in Paris, where he wrote music criticism and had more than 20 operettas performed between 1870 and the end of the century. His operetta La Dot mal placée ("The Misplaced Dowry", 1873) was a hit abroad as well as in Paris. It played 117 times in Barcelona, and had similar runs in Naples, Madrid and Austria. Madame Boniface was given in Montreal in 1885. Ma mie Rosette (1890) was his biggest success in Britain in 1892, starring Jessie Bond and Courtice Pounds, among others, with additional music by Ivan Caryll. In France, the most successful of his shows was Jeanne, Jeannette et Jeanneton (1876), which ran for more than 200 performances despite having a libretto previously rejected by Offenbach.

In addition to his operas, Lacôme composed songs, chamber music and orchestral works, including a ballet, Le rêve d'Elias (1899), which ran for more than 100 performances in Paris and had a similar run in London. To mark the centenary of the French Revolution in 1889, he conceived the idea of reviving the operas of the revolutionary era, reorchestrating them to suit modern tastes. Under his supervision there were revivals of Paisiello's The Barber of Seville and Dalayrac's Raoul, sire de Créqui and La soirée orageuse at the Opéra Comique.

In 1901 Lacôme retired, returning to live at the family house at Le Houga. He became a local benefactor, endowing the church and founding a music school at Mont-de-Marsan nearby, where he taught until 1912. He was made a Chevalier of the Legion of Honour. Some of Lacôme's works were revived in Paris during the First World War, when, as one commentator put it, the French craved reminders of a happier era. Between 1914 and 1918 there were revivals of Ma mie Rosette and Jeanne, Jeannette et Jeanneton, and two revivals of Madame Boniface.

Lacôme died at his house in Le Houga at the age of 82.

Paul Lacôme has sometimes been confused with his fellow composer Paul Lacombe (1837–1927). Some of Lacôme's scores, including La fille de l'air and Les quatre filles Aymon, were published as composed by "Paul Lacombe".

== Works ==
Lacôme's operettas are listed below, with the names of the librettists and dates of Paris premières:

- L’épicier par amour, 1 act, 1870
- J’veux mon peignoir, 1 act, Georges Mancel, 1872
- En Espagne, 1 act, Mancel, 1872
- La dot mal placée, 3 acts, Mancel, 1873
- Le mouton enragé, 1 act, Adolphe Jaime and Jules Noriac, 1873
- Amphytrion, 1 act, C. Nuitter and Beaumont, 1875
- Jeanne Jeannette et Jeanneton, 3 acts, Charles Clairville and Alfred Delacour, 1876 (retitled The Marquis in the United States)
- Pâques fleuries, 3 acts, Clairville and Delacour, 1879
- Le beau Nicolas, 3 acts, Albert Vanloo and Eugène Letterier, 1880
- La nuit de Saint Jean, 1 act, M. de Lua-Lusignan and Delacour, after Erckmann-Chatrian, 1882
- Madame Boniface, 3 acts, Clairville and Ernest Depré, 1883
- Myrtille, 4 acts, Emile Erckmann, Alexandre Chatrian and Maurice Drack, 1885
- Les saturnales, 3 acts, Albin Valabrègue, 1887
- La gardeuse d’oies, 3 acts, Letterier and Vanloo, 1888
- Ma mie Rosette, 3 acts, Jules Préval and Armand Liorat, 1890
- La fille de l’air, opérette fantastique in 4 acts and 7 tableaux, Coignard brothers, after Liorat, 1890
- Mademoiselle Asmodée (music by Lacôme and Victor Roger), 3 acts, P. Ferrier and Clairville, 1891
- Le cadeau de noces, 4 acts, Liorat, Stop and A. Hue, 1893
- Le bain de Monsieur, 1 act, J. Pradels and Mancel, 1895
- La fiancée en loterie (music by Lacôme and André Messager), 3 acts, A. Douane and C. de Roddaz, 1896 *Le maréchal Chaudron, 3 acts, Henri Chivot and Jean Gascogne, 1898
- Les quatre filles Aymon (music by Lacôme and Victor Roger), 3 acts, Liorat and Albert Fontenay, 1898
