= Mary Cowden Clarke =

English author (1809–1898)

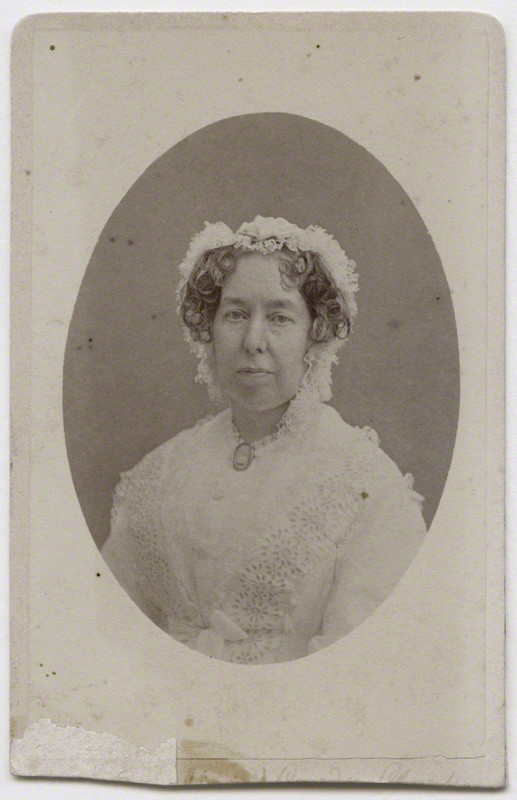
- Portrait of Mary Cowden Clarke, c. 1870
- Born: Mary Victoria Novello; 22 June 1809; London, England
- Died: 12 January 1898 (aged 88); Genoa, Italy
- Occupation: Author
- Spouse: Charles Cowden Clarke (m. 1828; died 1877)

Signature
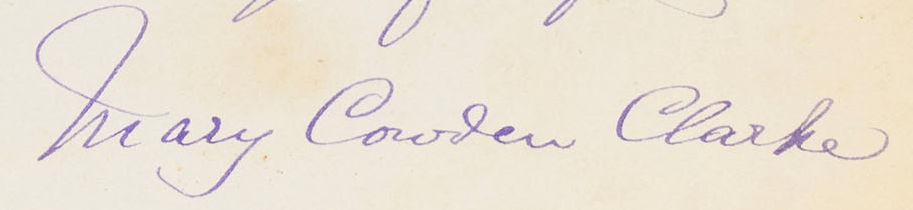

Mary Victoria Cowden Clarke (née Novello; pen names, M. H. and Harry Wandsworth Shortfellow; 22 June 1809 – 12 January 1898) was an English author, and compiler of a concordance to Shakespeare.

== Early life and education ==
Mary Victoria Novello was born at 240 Oxford Street, London, on 22 June 1809. She was the eldest daughter of eleven children of Vincent Novello, and his wife, Mary Sabilla Hehl. She was called Victoria after her father's friend the Rev. Victor Fryer. During her early years she made at her father's house the acquaintance of many men distinguished in art and letters. John Varley, Copley Fielding, Havell, and Joshua Cristall among artists, and Charles and Mary Lamb, Leigh Hunt, and John Keats among writers, were included in the circle of her father's most intimate friends, and she acquired much of her taste for literature from Mary Lamb, who gave her lessons in Latin and poetical reading. She is mentioned as "Victoria" in several of Lamb's letters to Vincent Novello; and Leigh Hunt and the Lambs maintained throughout their lives affectionate relations with Cowden-Clarke and her husband.

Her education was entrusted to the care of a M. Bonnefoy, who kept a school at Boulogne-sur-Mer, France.

== Career ==
On her return to England, she acted for a short time as governess in a family named Purcell residing at Cranford, London, but she was compelled to abandon this employment owing to ill-health. She published "My Arm Chair", under the initials "M. H.", in William Hone's Table Book in 1827. This contribution was followed by others of a similar nature and a paper on "The Assignats in currency at the time of the French Republic of 1792".

On 1 November 1826 she was engaged to Charles Cowden Clarke, her brother Alfred's business partner, who had been for many years a close friend of the Novellos. On 5 July 1828, the couple married, spending their honeymoon at the 'Greyhound' at Enfield. The marriage was celebrated by Lamb in a playful Serenata, for two Voices, which he sent to Vincent Novello in a letter dated 6 Nov. 1828. Charles and Mary Cowden-Clarke continued to live with the Novello family.

In the year after her marriage, Cowden Clarke began her valuable Shakespeare concordance. The compilation occupied twelve years, a further four years being devoted to seeing it through the press. It was eventually issued in eighteen monthly parts (1844–1845), and in volume form in 1845 as The Complete Concordance to Shakespeare, being a Verbal Index to all the Passages in the Dramatic Works of the Poet. This work superseded the Copious Index to ... Shakespeare (1790) of Samuel Ayscough, and the Complete Verbal Index ... (1805–1807) of Francis Twiss.

In November 1847 and January 1848, Cowden-Clarke played Mrs. Malaprop in three amateur productions of The Rivals. These private theatricals led to an introduction through Leigh Hunt to Charles Dickens, who persuaded her to perform in the amateur company which, under his direction, gave representations in London and several provincial towns in aid of the establishment of a perpetual curatorship of Shakespeare's birthplace at Stratford-on-Avon. Cowden-Clarke's roles included Dame Quickly in The Merry Wives of Windsor at the Haymarket, on 15 May 1848, Tib in Every Man in his Humour, and Mrs. Hillary in Kenney's Love, Law, and Physic on 17 May. The repertoire also contained Animal Magnetism, Two o'clock in the Morning, and Used Up; and performances were given during June and July at Liverpool, Birmingham, Edinburgh, and Glasgow. In 1849, the Novellos moved to Nice, and their house, Craven Hill Cottage (9 Craven Hill, Bayswater), was taken by the Cowden-Clarkes.

Meanwhile, Cowden-Clarke wrote various essays in Shakespearean interpretation. A small volume entitled Shakespeare Proverbs; or, the Wise Saws of our wisest Poet collected into a Modern Instance, appeared in 1848, and between 1850 and 1852 was published, in three volumes, a series of fifteen tales under the general title of The Girlhood of Shakespeare's Heroines. The tales have each separate title pages and were dedicated among others to William Charles Macready, Charles Dickens, Douglas Jerrold, Leigh Hunt, and John Payne Collier. From 1853 to 1856, Cowden-Clarke edited The Musical Times, to which she induced Hunt to contribute. She herself wrote for the paper a long series of articles called Music among the Poets.

In 1856, the Cowden-Clarkes left England permanently for Italy. From that year to 1861, the date of Vincent Novello's death, they lived at Nice, removing after 1861 to Genoa, where their house was named Villa Novello. While at Nice, Cowden-Clarke published World-noted Women, or Types of Womanly Attributes of all Lands and all Ages (New York City, 1858). In 1860, she issued Shakespeare's Works, edited with a scrupulous revision of the text (New York and London), and in 1864, The Life and Labours of Vincent Novello. During the preceding year, she and her husband began for Messrs. Cassell & Co. their annotated edition of Shakespeare's plays. This was published in weekly numbers, completed on 16 March 1868, and was reissued in three volumes with illustrations by H. C. Selous. Immediately afterwards, they started The Shakespeare Key, unlocking the Treasures of his Style, elucidating the Peculiarities of his Construction, and displaying the Beauties of his Expression; forming a Companion to The Complete Concordance to Shakespeare. This, though finished in June 1872, was not published until 1879. During the next few years the Recollections of Writers were contributed by Cowden-Clarke and her husband to the Gentleman's Magazine.

Charles Cowden-Clarke died, age 90, on 13 March 1877, and in the following year, his widow was in England superintending the publication in volume form of the Recollections. The series, containing letters and memoirs of John Keats, Leigh Hunt, Douglas Jerrold, Charles Dickens, and Charles and Mary Lamb, appeared with a preface by Mrs. Cowden-Clarke in 1878. She was in England again in the summer of 1881. In 1887, she commemorated the hundredth anniversary of her husband's birth with a Centennial Biographic Sketch of Charles Cowden-Clarke, which was printed privately, and in 1896, she published an autobiography entitled My Long Life.

She died at Villa Novello, Genoa, on 12 January 1898, aged 89.

== Selected works ==
- Kit Bam's Adventures: or, The Yarns of an Old Mariner (1849)
- Concordance to Shakespeare (1846)
- The Girlhood of Shakespeare's Heroines (1850)
- The Iron Cousin (1854)
- A Companion to Longfellow's "Hiawatha.": The Song of Drop O' Wather, A London Legend (pseud. Harry Wandsworth Shortfellow) (1856)
- Florence Nightingale (1857)
- World-Noted Women; or, Types of Womanly Attributes of All Lands and Ages (1858)
- The Life and Labours of Vincent Novello (1864)
- Honey from the Weed (verses, 1881)
- Memorial Sonnets (1888)
- My Long Life: An Autobiographic Sketch (1897)
