= Alfred Novello =

English music publisher (1810–1896)

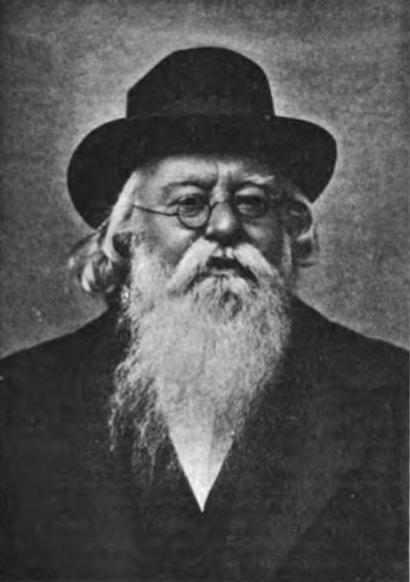
- Born: Joseph Alfred Novello; 12 August 1810; London, England
- Died: 17 July 1896 (aged 85–86); Woolwich, England
- Occupation: Music publisher
- Father: Vincent Novello

Joseph Alfred Novello (12 August 1810 – 17 July 1896) was an English music publisher. He was the eldest son of Vincent Novello, and the creator of Novello and Company Ltd as a revolutionary force in music publishing.

== Life ==
J. Alfred Novello was born in London, the eldest son of the famous organist and composer Vincent Novello, who was the father of eleven children; two died in infancy, two survived infancy but died in childhood, and a son died in early manhood. One son and five daughters survived to carry on the family musical tradition. In 1811 Vincent Novello founded the music publishing firm Novello & Co which carries his name, as he issued sheet music on a subscription basis from his own house and continued to do so until his son J. Alfred Novello took over the business in 1829 at the early age of nineteen. Before this business venture, Alfred, as a bass singer, had done some professional singing.

In 1836, Novello began publishing The Musical World, a periodical that was the first weekly devoted to music; its publication continued until 1891. In 1842 Novello acquired Mainzer's Musical Times and Singing Circular. This formed the basis of The Musical Times and Singing Class Circular, published monthly from 1844 and (as The Musical Times) still in business today.

Alfred Novello promoted and built the business into a huge commercial success, and is credited as being the first to introduce inexpensive sheet music (reducing the retail price by a factor of four) and to depart from the method of publishing by subscription. From 1841, Henry Littleton assisted Alfred Novello, becoming a partner in 1861 when the firm became Novello & Co. On Alfred's retirement and the completion of the sale in 1866, Littleton became sole proprietor. Having incorporated the firm of Ewer & Co. in 1867, the title was changed to Novello, Ewer & Co., and still later back to Novello & Co., and, on Henry Littleton's death in 1888, his two sons carried on the business.

Before his retirement, Alfred Novello actively worked against British "taxation of knowledge" and played a significant role in the 1853 repeal of the advertisement duty, the 1855 repeal of the newspaper stamp, repeal of duties on paper and foreign books, and repeal of the security system. He was a friend of Henry Bessemer.

After his retirement from the music publishing business, Alfred Novello moved to Genoa and pursued his interests in the Italian Irrigation Company, playing and composing organ music, and the study of hydrodynamics. He obtained several patents on ship construction and worked with William Froude. He died in Genoa.
