= Le droit d'aînesse =

Opera by Francis Chassaigne, premiered in 1883

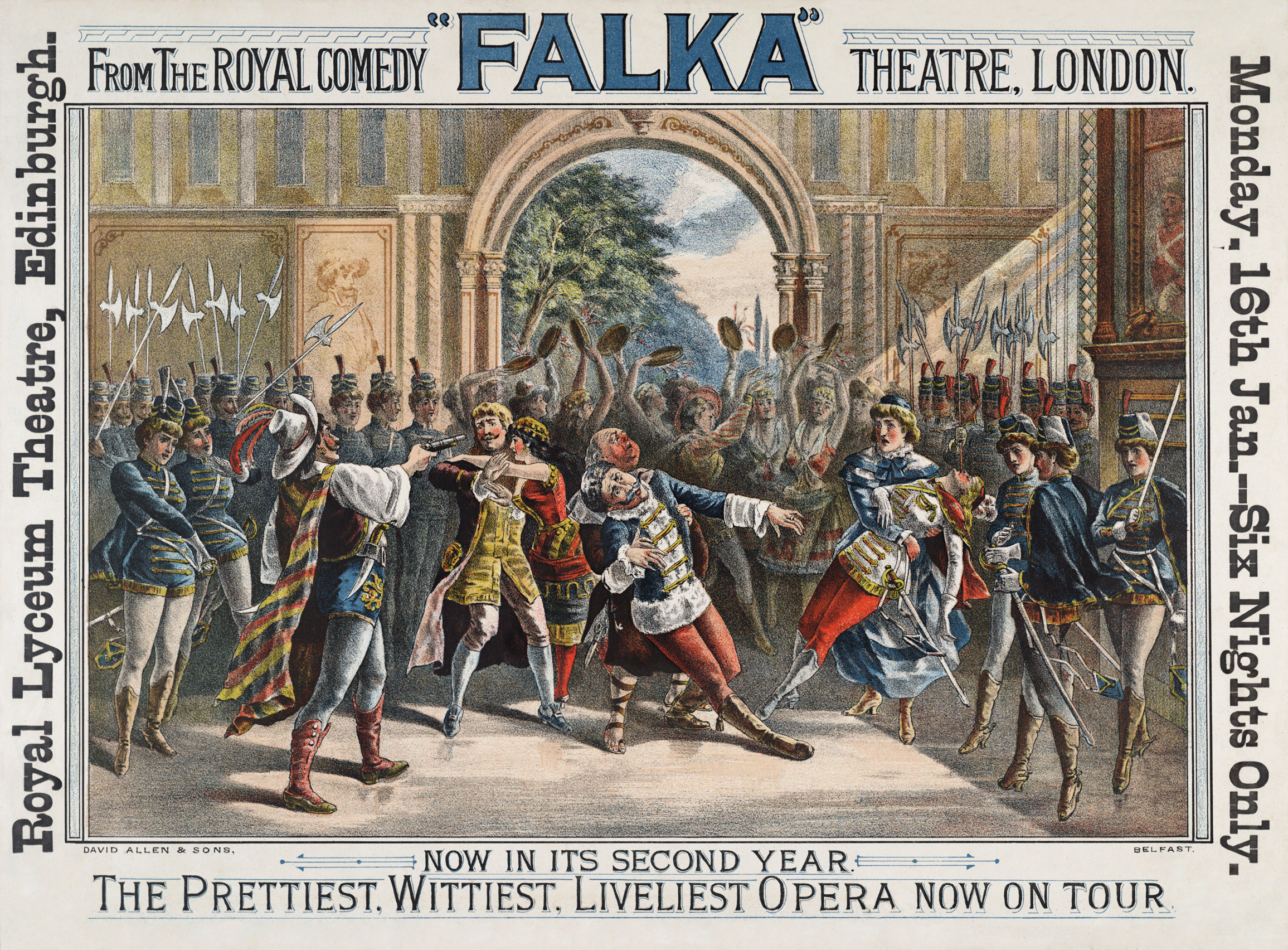
Poster for the English-language version, Falka, at the Royal Lyceum Theatre, Edinburgh, 1885

Le droit d'aînesse (French pronunciation: [lə dʁwa dɛnɛs], "The Birthright") is an opéra bouffe, a form of operetta, in three acts by Francis Chassaigne with a French libretto by Eugène Leterrier and Albert Vanloo. The story concerns an arranged marriage intended to make a governor's heir, his nephew, an aristocrat. Through a series of mishaps that place the governor's nephew and his niece each in danger, the niece, Falka, becomes the noble heir. The opera premiered in Paris in 1883. An English-language version titled Falka (after the name of the principal female character), with a libretto translated and adapted by Henry Brougham Farnie, was successfully premiered in London later that year followed by productions throughout the English-speaking world.

== Le droit d'aînesse ==
Le droit d'aînesse was first performed on 27 January 1883, at the Théâtre des Nouveautés in Paris, directed by Jules Brasseur with a cast featuring Marguerite Ugalde, Jean-François Berthelier, Juliette Darcourt, Albert Brasseur and Eugène Vauthier.

=== Roles and premiere cast ===
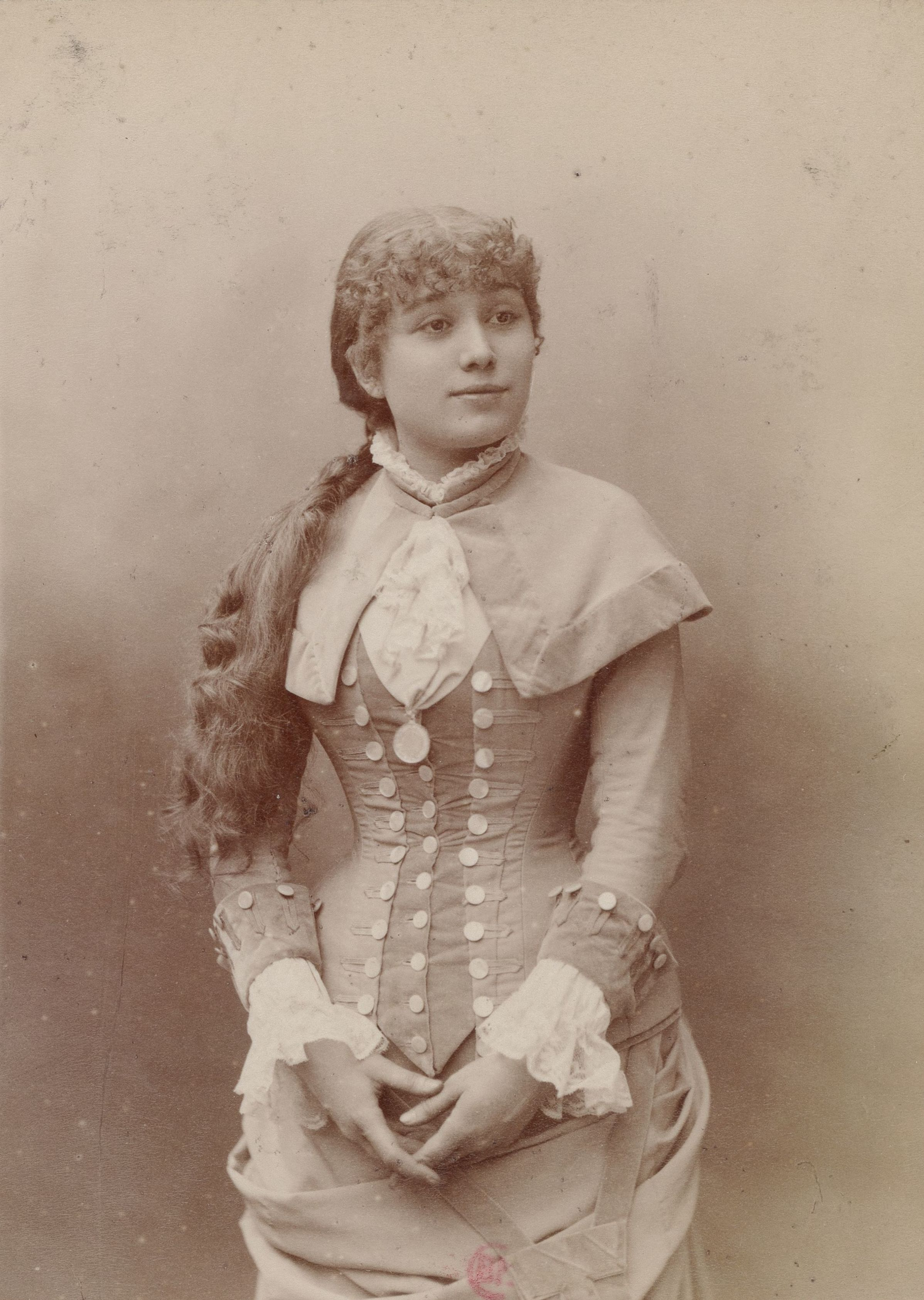
Marguerite Ugalde who sang the role of Falka in the premiere of Le droit d'aînesse.

Role	Voice type	Premiere cast, 27 January 1883
Kolback, military governor of Montgratz		Bonnet
Tancrède, Kolback's nephew	tenor	Jean-François Berthelier
Arthur, a student		Albert Brasseur
Brother Pélican, doorkeeper of the convent		Scipion
Boleslas, chief of the Tzigani		Eugène Vauthier
Janos		Charvet
Falka, Kolback's niece	mezzo-soprano	Marguerite Ugalde
Edwige, sister of Boleslas		Juliette Darcourt
Marja		Moriane
Minna, her maid		Marcelle
Rosen		Ducouret
Thilda		Norette
Christiane		Lucy Jane
Shapska		Varennes

== Falka ==
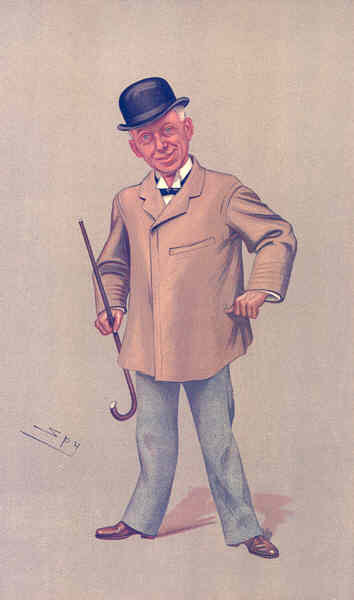
Penley in Vanity Fair, 1893

Falka, the English version of Le droit d'aînesse, with Leterrier and Vanloo's libretto translated and adapted by Henry Brougham Farnie, was first produced at the Comedy Theatre in London on 29 October 1883. Violet Cameron performed the title role of Falka, Harry Paulton was Folbach, and W. S. Penley was Brother Pelican. It ran at the Comedy for 157 performances. Charles Manners later played Boleslas, and Giulia Warwick played the title role on tour. It was revived at the Avenue Theatre in 1885, still starring Cameron, with Hayden Coffin and E. J. Lonnen. Falka also enjoyed successful productions in Australia, New Zealand and the United States, including 1884 and 1900 productions on Broadway. The first of these, at the Casino Theatre, starred J. H. Ryley.

== Synopsis ==
This synopsis is based on Falka.

=== Act 1 ===
The Emperor of Hungary has promised Governor Folbach a patent of nobility providing that he can produce an heir able to wed a woman chosen by the Emperor. Folbach is childless but has a nephew and a niece that he had previously sent away to school and a convent, respectively. He summons his nephew, Tancred, the heir presumptive. On his way to see his uncle, Tancred is captured by a band of gypsies (Tzigans). Edwige, the chief's sister, promises to release him if he agrees to marry her. Tancred agrees, but he escapes before the wedding can take place. Edwige and her brother Boleslas pursue Tancred. Although they had not seen his face in the darkness, they follow the sound of his voice. Along the way, they learn that he is the nephew of the Governor. They hide and wait for him. Tancred learns of their scheme and does not appear before his uncle, writing a note that he is ill.

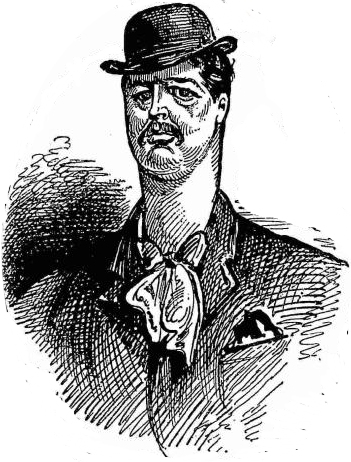
Caricature of Farnie

Meanwhile, Falka, the Governor's niece, has eloped from the convent with Arthur, a rich farmer's son. They also travel to the inn where the Governor is waiting for Tancred; they are followed by Brother Pelican, the door-keeper at the convent. Falka manages to elude detection by dressing in Arthur's clothes. Upon learning that her brother is expected at the inn, Falka impersonates him. Brother Pelican finds Falka's clothing and assumes that Arthur is Falka disguised as a man. He promptly arrests Arthur; Arthur plays along with Falka's scheme and keeps quiet. The gypsies witness the meeting of Falka and Folbach and believe they have found Tancred. The Governor also believes that Falka is Tancred, and they go off to the castle for a wedding between "Tancred" and Alexina de Kelkirsch, the wealthy bride whom the Emperor has assigned to wed Folbach's heir.

=== Act 2 ===
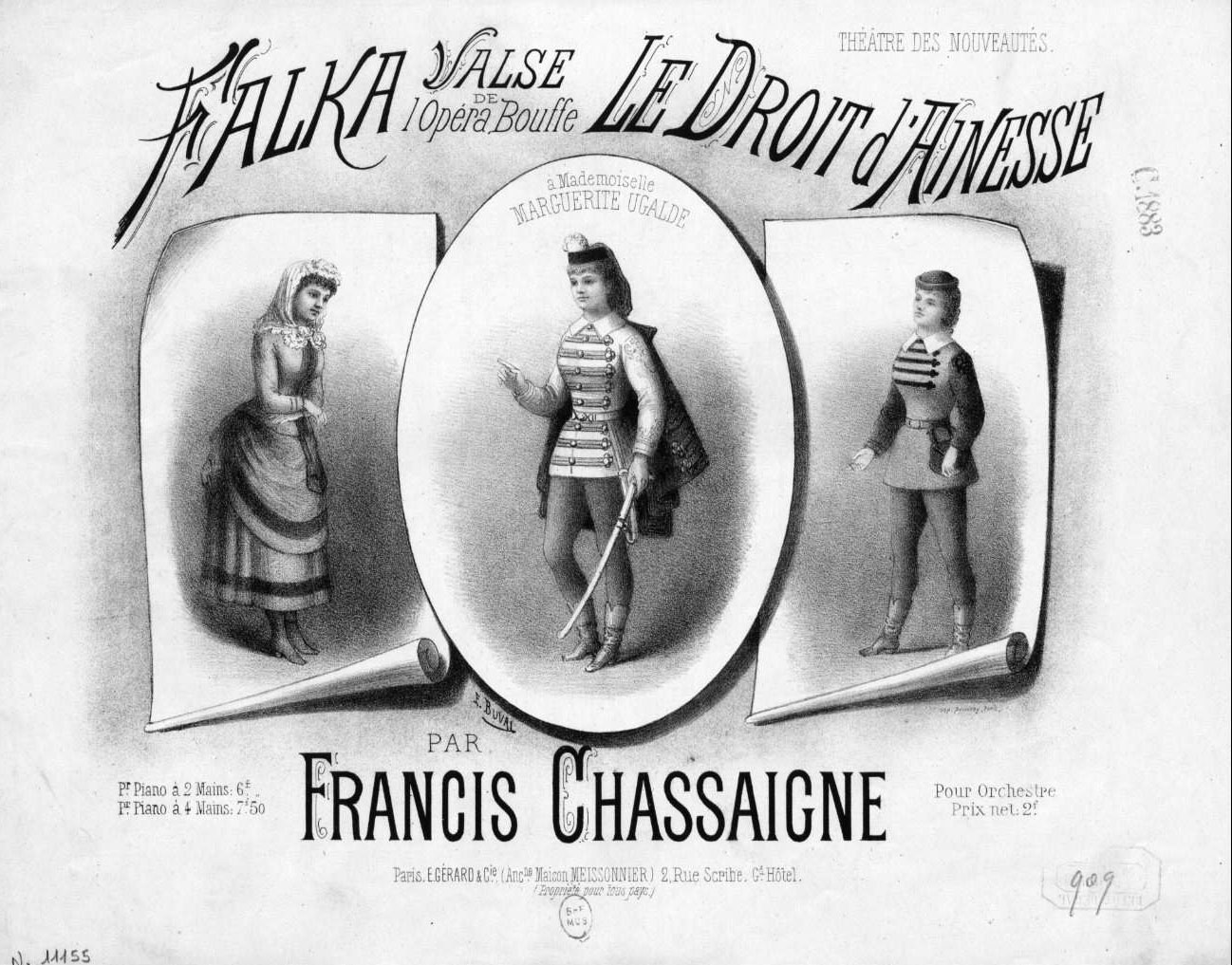
Cover of the score for "Falka's Waltz" based on music from Le droit d'aînesse

Arthur is forced to put on convent dress and is marched away to the convent by Pelican, leaving Falka, in hussar uniform, to try to gain her uncle's consent to her marriage with Arthur. Unfortunately, Folbach dislikes girls. Tancred angrily arrives, in disguise as a footman, to defeat the young impostor, not knowing that it is his sister. He does not reveal himself because of the gypsies, but he hopes that they will kill his rival, whom they believe is Tancred. When the gypsies arrive, Boleslas challenges Falka to a duel denouncing "Tancred" for breaking his promise to marry Edwige. Falka avoids the duel by confessing to Edwige that she is a woman. Arthur is brought back from the convent in haste and confesses the scheme to the Governor. The Governor is disgusted and orders the pair out of his presence. When Tancred hears this, he cries "O joy! O rapture!" The gypsies recognize his voice. Folbach is shocked that his nephew is betrothed to a gypsy and that the impostor is his niece.

=== Act 3 ===
The Governor, who is obliged to carry out the emperor's will, begrudgingly goes on with the marriage of Tancred and Alexina. He is not pleased with the behavior or his niece or nephew. Falka is sent to a tower to await her return to the convent. Boleslas arrives with Edwige. Tancred has sent Boleslas money to stay away, but the gypsy assumes that it is for the wedding dress, which he has purchased. Edwige has a discussion with Alexina and, as a result, Edwige and Tancred marry. Meanwhile, Falka escapes from her tower only to be recaptured and led before her uncle. The Governor admires her spirit and pardons her, just as the notice from the Emperor arrives allowing Folbach to make his niece his heiress, settling the succession in the female bloodline. All are pleased except, perhaps, Tancred.
