= Pierre-Alfred Ravel =

French actor (1811–1881)

Ravel in mid-career

Pierre-Alfred Ravel (6 January 1811 – 26 April 1881) was a French actor of the 19th century, best known for his appearance in comedies. He was a leading player at the Théâtre du Palais-Royal and the Théâtre du Gymnase Dramatique. His most celebrated role was Fadinard in Un chapeau de paille d'Italie (The Italian Straw Hat)

== Life and career ==
=== Early years ===
Ravel was born in Bordeaux, the son of a horse dealer. As a young man he was employed as a clerk, first to a notary in Bordeaux, and then to an optician in Paris. He joined a travelling theatre troupe and learned the craft of acting. From 1837 to 1841 he was engaged by the Théâtre du Vaudeville in Paris. His first major role was in a piece called Tourlourou, where, according to Henry Lyonnet's Dictionnaire des comédiens français (1912), he showed "a charming verve in the gallant and vivacious character of Fleur d'amour". He created more than twenty roles for the Vaudeville.

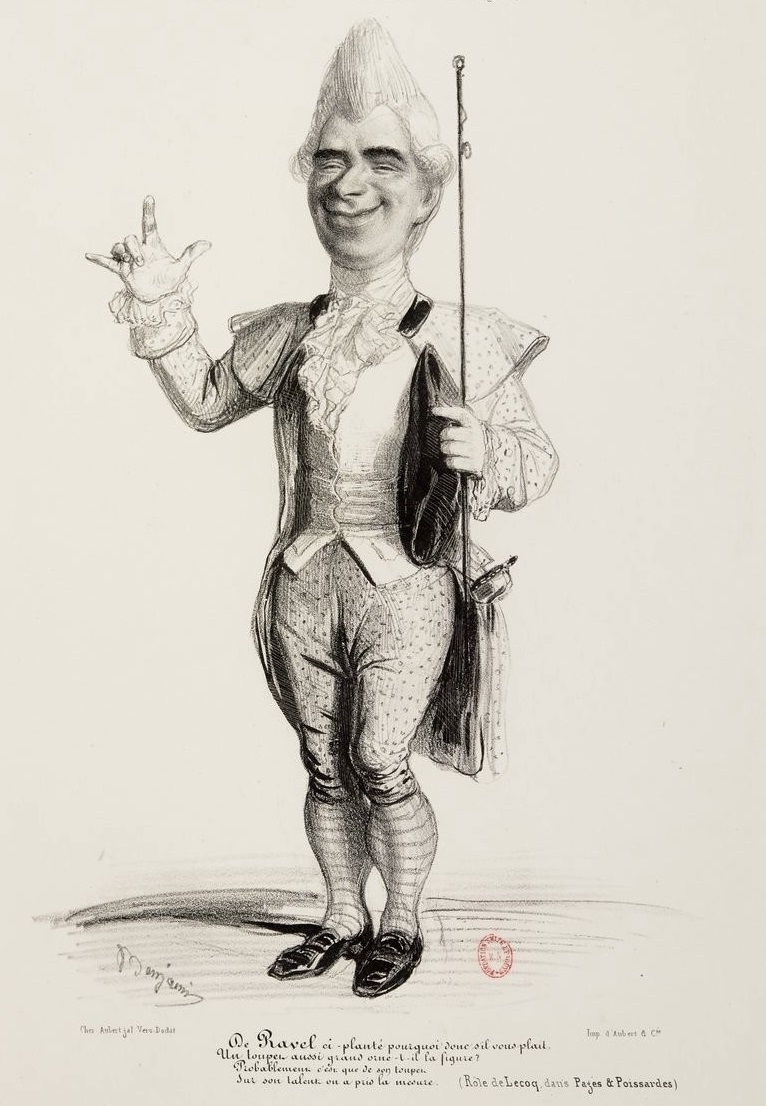
Ravel as Lecoq in Pages et Poissardes by Edmond Rochefort and Bernard Lopez, 1840

In May 1841 Ravel first appeared at the Théâtre du Palais-Royal, where he remained a leading player for twenty years. "To list Ravel's creations at the Palais-Royal", wrote one of his biographers, "is to put before the reader's eyes the greatest successes of this theatre from 1841 to 1862". The Palais-Royal company made several appearances in London during Ravel's time, beginning in 1848, when one London critic wrote of him:

Ravel [is] one of the most original performers on the French stage … he is unlike anything upon the stage, whether English or foreign, that we know of. His style is peculiarly his own; it is formed upon no rule or model but that of his spontaneous conception; he is never two moments in the same humour, with the same expression, but he is always Ravel. With a sharp eye, sharp features, he is angular and eccentric in style; and yet so vigorous, so bold is his execution, that every touch of his chameleon fancy comes out in bold relief upon the canvas, if we may speak of his performance as a picture.

Lyonnet lists some of Ravel's starring roles in his first decade at the Palais-Royal between 1841, but comments that they were all eclipsed by his greatest success, Fadinard in the 1851 comedy Un chapeau de paille d'Italie (The Italian Straw Hat), by Eugène Labiche and Marc-Michel, which Lyonnet describes as the Palais-Royal's greatest success.

=== Later years ===
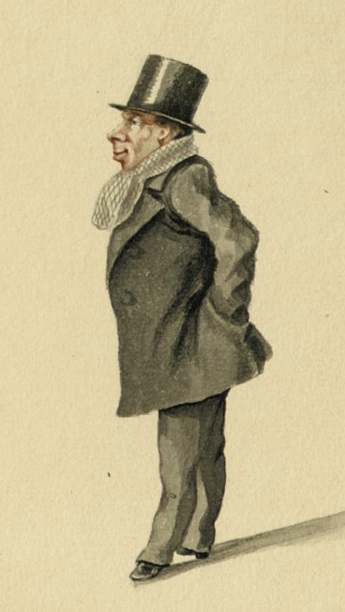
Ravel by Lhéritier

Around 1863 Ravel's status as the leading star of the Palais-Royal began to be undermined. The first factor was the success of another Labiche play, La Cagnotte(fr) (The Jackpot), in which Ravel did not appear but which established Jean-Marie Geoffroy(fr) as a rival star at the theatre. Another development that harmed Ravel's career was the increasing popularity of opérette bouffe while Ravel's genre, comédie en vaudevilles, was in decline.

Ravel embarked on tours in the French provinces and abroad, generally without much success, although he was well received in London in 1867. He returned to France, and was engaged by the Théâtre du Gymnase Dramatique in October 1868 to recreate one of his earlier successes, Un monsieur qui suit les femmes (A man who pursues women), by Théodore Barrière and Adrien Decourcelle, first seen in 1850. There followed successful revivals of more of his best-known vehicles. In 1876 Ravel returned to the Palais-Royal in Mon mari est à Versailles, the Théâtre de la Porte Saint-Martin in Les enfants du Capitaine Grant (1878) and Cendrillon (Cinderella, 1878).

Over the years Ravel developed and changed his acting style. During his first 20 years at the Palais-Royal, he had specialised in juveniles, dashing but naïve, highly articulate and moving at high speed. Later he displayed what Lyonnet calls "a delicacy and a delightful gentleness". An English critic, writing in 1873, wrote that although he was essentially a comedian, Ravel also possessed considerable powers of pathos. Another critic called him "inimitable … full of life and gaiety, his countenance, by-play, and pantomime causing shouts of laughter. He is, undoubtedly, a great artist."

Ravel had no thought of retirement, and in 1881, at the age of 70, he was on the verge of taking up a new post as stage manager of the Grand Théâtre de Monte Carlo when he died suddenly at Neuilly-sur-Seine. His mother, aged 95, and his wife survived him.

== References and sources ==
=== Sources ===
- Lyonnet, Henry (1912). Dictionnaire des comédiens, Volume 2, E–Z (in French). Geneva: Revue Universelle Internationale Illustrée. OCLC 830177987.
