= Juliette Darcourt =

French actress and singer

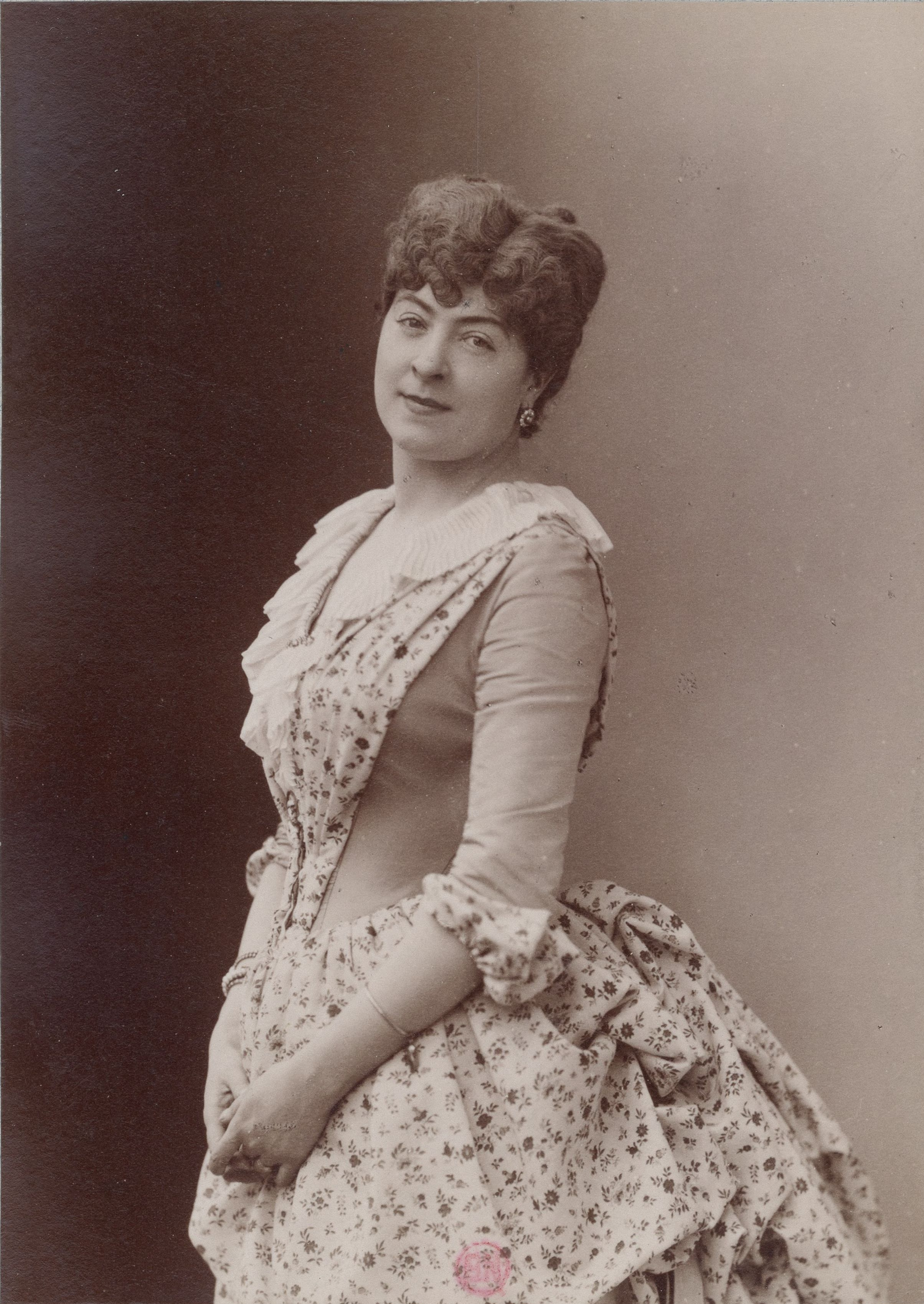
- Juliette Darcourt, photographed by Nadar in 1885
- Other names: Juliette d'Harcourt
- Occupations: Actress, singer

Juliette Darcourt also seen as Juliette d'Harcourt, was a French actress and singer on the Paris stage.

== Career ==
In 1878, Darcourt was a young beauty in the company of Coco, at the opening of Jules Brasseur's Théâtre des Nouveautés in Paris. She appeared in operettas, often with the Opéra-Comique, including Le Premier Baiser (1883), Vie Parisienne (1883), Le Château de Tire-Larigot (1884), La Nuits aux soufflets (1884), L'Oiseau bleu (1884), La Vie mondaine (1885), Le Petit Chaperon rouge (1885), L'amour Mouillé (1887), Le Puits qui parle (1888), Juanita (1891), and Le Commandant Laripète (1892).

In 1899 Darcourt was in the casts of Le Faubourg and Les Amants Legitimes in Paris. She was in Sylvie, ou La Curieuse d'Amour in 1900. In 1901 she was in the cast of Paul Hervieu's play, The Trail of the Torch, when it debuted at the Théatre du Vaudeville. In 1903, she was described as "particularly good" in a production of L'Adversaire by Alfred Capus. She was considered a fashionable woman; reports and photographs of her gowns were published internationally.

Darcourt married the actor Albert Brasseur (Jules's son), who died in 1932.
