= Marguerite Ugalde =

French mezzo-soprano

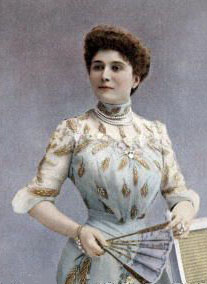
Marguerite Ugalde

Marguerite Ugalde (née Marie Varcollier) (1862–1940) was a French mezzo-soprano. She was the daughter of the singer and theatre manager Delphine Ugalde.

After studies in Paris with her mother, her first professional engagement was in 1879 at Étretat; she made her debut at the Opéra Comique on 19 April 1880 as Marie in La fille du régiment. She created the roles of Mnazile in Le Bois (11 October 1880) and Nicklausse in the first performance of Les contes d'Hoffmann by Offenbach in 1881. On the 18 November 1881, before the unveiling of a bust of Offenbach Ugalde and Adèle Isaac sang, and encored, the barcarolle from Hoffmann.

After this short period at the Opéra Comique Ugalde moved over to operetta, both in Paris and elsewhere. At the Théâtre des Nouveautés she created Manola in Le jour et la nuit (5 November 1881), Wladimir in Fatinitza (6 April 1882), Falka in Le droit d'aînesse (27 January 1883), Stenio Strozzi in L'Oiseau bleu (16 January 1884), Denisette in Le Petit Chaperon rouge (1885) and Rosette in Serment d'amour (1886).

She sang the first D'Artagnan in Les petits mousquetaires (5 March 1885) at the Théâtre des Folies-Dramatiques, as well as, after a serious illness, triumphing as René Belamour in Suppé's Juanita. At the Théâtre des Bouffes-Parisiens (from 1887), where her mother had taken over the management, she gave first performances in several other operettas.

Ugalde toured Belgium in 1888 and 1889 before returning to the Nouveautés as Jovaline in Le Royaume des Femmes (28 February 1889). At the Théâtre du Gymnase, she created Colinette in the comic play L'art de tromper les femmes (7 October 1890), following this with Koudjé in Mon oncle Barbassou (6 November 1891).

In the vaudeville operetta Vingt-huit jours de Clairette she sang the title role (Folies-Dramatiques, 3 May 1892) and also appeared in a revival of Juanita. Further successes at the Théâtre des Variétés followed (Fragoletto in Les brigands, 1893) and as Joseph in Gamin de Paris at the Théâtre des Nations.

She played Nicole in Le bourgeois gentilhomme (1904) and Toinette in Le malade imaginaire (1905) in productions of Molière at the Gaité. In 1908 she played Mme Brémont in Le Jouet at the Théâtre Femina.
