= La Forge des châtaigniers =

La Forge des châtaigniers is a 3-act drama by Eugène Labiche, premiered at Paris in the Théâtre Saint-Marcel on 4 April 1839.

The collaborators were Auguste Lefranc and Marc-Michel under the collective pseudonym Paul Dandré.

This play was not published.
