= Jules Brasseur =

French actor and singer (1829–1890)

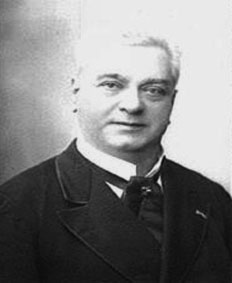
- Born: 1829; Paris
- Died: 6 October 1890 (aged 60–61); Paris
- Occupations: Actor, singer
- Years active: 1847 – 1890

Jules Brasseur (French pronunciation: [ʒyl bʁasœʁ]; 1829-1890) was a French actor and singer, born 1829 in Paris and died in the same city in 1890, who achieved considerable popular success in Paris and around France in the second half of the 19th century.

== Life and career ==
Born Jules-Victor-Alexandre Dumont, his father was a wood merchant and destined his son for business; a position was secured for him as assistant glove-maker in a shop in the Chaussée d'Antin.

An interest in the theatre awoke in him around 1847 and he made his debut at the Théâtre de Belleville, before appearing at the Délassements-Comiques and at the Folies-Dramatiques. In August 1852 he created the role of Machavoine in Le Misanthrope et l'Auvergnat by Labiche at the Palais-Royal securing a major success.

Having appeared in Le Brésilien (alongside Hortense Schneider) in 1863, for which Offenbach wrote (anonymously) a 'Ronde du Brésilien' which became hugely popular, he also appeared alongside Offenbach's Bouffes-Parisiens troupe in Bad Ems, singing songs and comic scenes.

Brasseur remained at the Palais-Royal until 1877, creating many roles, including the Brésilien/Frick/Prosper in La Vie parisienne by Offenbach in 1866. His forte was grotesques, and he often exaggerated effects in the extreme sometimes to the point of becoming hoarse. He was skilled in transformation, the Goncourt brothers describing him thus « C'est toute une troupe que Brasseur. Il est cinq, six acteurs, que sais-je? Toutes les voix, tous les gestes, toutes les physionomies, il les prend, non il les a » ("Brasseur is a complete troupe. He is five, six actors – who can say ? Every voice, every gesture, every expression, he can take on – no, he has them"). He also had the reputation of easily losing his temper.

During the summers he would tour the provinces with his own theatrical troupe and was also sought after in salons, where he would sing chansonnettes.

In 1878 he left the Palais-Royal and founded the Théâtre des Nouveautés, whose direction he upheld until his death.

As the theatre director, Brasseur leant towards operetta and staged Fatinitza, followed by among others, La Cantinière, a vaudeville with music by Planquette, Le Jour et la Nuit, by Lecocq, Le Cœur et la Main, L'Oiseau bleu, Droit d'aînesse, by Francis Chassaigne, le Premier Baiser, by Émile Jonas; le Roi de Carreau, by Théodore Lajarte; le Petit Chaperon Rouge by Gaston Serpette, and Serment d'Amour, by Audran.

His son Albert Brasseur also became an actor and they appeared many times on the same stage. The stage name was taken on by another actress, Germaine Brasseur and her descendants: Pierre Brasseur, Claude Brasseur and Alexandre Brasseur.

== Plays in which he appeared ==
- 1852: Le Misanthrope et l'Auvergnat (Eugène Labiche), Théâtre du Palais-Royal
- 1853: Un feu de cheminée (Eugène Labiche), Théâtre du Palais-Royal
- 1854: Le Sabot de Marguerite (Marc-Michel and Pol Moreau), Théâtre du Palais-Royal
- 1855: Le Roman chez la portière (Henry Monnier and Gabriel de Lurieu), Théâtre du Palais-Royal
- 1855: La Perle de la Canebière (Eugène Labiche and Marc-Michel), Théâtre du Palais-Royal
- 1855: Les Précieux (Eugène Labiche, Marc-Michel and Auguste Lefranc), Théâtre du Palais-Royal
- 1856: Un monsieur qui a brûlé une dame (Eugène Labiche and Auguste Anicet-Bourgeois), Théâtre du Palais-Royal
- 1857: Le Secrétaire de Madame (Eugène Labiche and Marc-Michel), Théâtre du Palais-Royal
- 1858: Le Punch Grassot (Eugène Grangé and Alfred Delacour), Théâtre du Palais-Royal
- 1858: Le Grain de café (Eugène Labiche and Marc-Michel), Théâtre du Palais-Royal
- 1858: En avant les Chinois ! (Eugène Labiche and Alfred Delacour), Théâtre du Palais-Royal
- 1859: Une tempête dans une baignoire (Charles Dupeuty and Gabriel de Lurieu), Théâtre du Palais-Royal
- 1859: L'Amour, un fort volume, prix 3 F 50 c (Eugène Labiche and Édouard Martin, Théâtre du Palais-Royal
- 1860: La Pénélope à la mode de Caen (Eugène Grangé, Paul Siraudin and Lambert-Thiboust), Théâtre du Palais-Royal
- 1860: La Sensitive (Eugène Labiche and Alfred Delacour), Théâtre du Palais-Royal
- 1860: Les Trois Fils de Cadet-Roussel (Michel Delaporte, Charles Varin et Paul Laurencin), Théâtre du Palais-Royal
- 1861: La Mariée du Mardi-gras (Eugène Grangé and Lambert-Thiboust), Théâtre du Palais-Royal
- 1861: La Beauté du diable (Eugène Grangé and Lambert-Thiboust), Théâtre du Palais-Royal
- 1863: Le Brésilien (Henri Meilhac and Ludovic Halévy), Théâtre du Palais-Royal
- 1863: Les Mystères de l'Hôtel des ventes (Henri Rochefort and Albert Wolff, Théâtre du Palais-Royal
- 1864: La Cagnotte (Eugène Labiche and Alfred Delacour), Théâtre du Palais-Royal
- 1865: La Bergère de la rue Monthabor (Eugène Labiche and Alfred Delacour), Théâtre du Palais-Royal
- 1866: Le Myosotis (William Busnach), Théâtre du Palais-Royal
- 1866: La Vie parisienne, opéra-bouffe by Jacques Offenbach, libretto by Henri Meilhac, Ludovic Halévy, Théâtre du Palais-Royal
- 1868: Le Papa du prix d'honneur (Eugène Labiche and Théodore Barrière), Théâtre du Palais-Royal
- 1868: Le château à Toto, opéra-bouffe by Jacques Offenbach, livret by Henri Meilhac and Ludovic Halévy, Théâtre du Palais-Royal
- 1868: Le Roi d'Amatibou (Eugène Labiche and Edmond Cottinet), Théâtre du Palais-Royal
- 1868: Le Carnaval d'un merle blanc (Henri Chivot and Alfred Duru), Théâtre du Palais-Royal
- 1870: Le Plus Heureux des trois (Eugène Labiche and Edmond Cottinet), Théâtre du Palais-Royal
- 1871: Tricoche et Cacolet (Henri Meilhac and Ludovic Halévy), Théâtre du Palais-Royal
- 1872: Il est de la police (Eugène Labiche and Louis Leroy), Théâtre du Palais-Royal
- 1872: La Tribune mécanique (Georges Vibert and Étienne-Prosper Berne-Bellecour), Théâtre du Palais-Royal
- 1872: Doit-on le dire ? (Eugène Labiche and Alfred Duru), Théâtre du Palais-Royal
- 1875: Un mouton à l'entresol (Eugène Labiche and Albéric Second), Théâtre du Palais-Royal
- 1875: Le Panache (Edmond Gondinet), Théâtre du Palais-Royal
- 1876: Le Prix Martin (Eugène Labiche and Émile Augier, Théâtre du Palais-Royal
- 1877: La Boîte à Bibi (Saint-Agnan Choler and Alfred Duru), Théâtre du Palais-Royal
- 1878: Coco (Clairville, Eugène Grangé and Alfred Delacour), Théâtre des Nouveautés
- 1879: Paris en actions (Albert Wolff and Raoul Toché), Théâtre des Nouveautés
- 1880: La Cantinière (vaudeville by Robert Planquette, words by Paul Burani and Félix Ribeyre), Théâtre des Nouveautés
- 1880: Les Parfums de Paris (Albert Wolff and Raoul Toché), Théâtre des Nouveautés
- 1881: La Vente de Tata (Albert Wolff and Alfred Hennequin), Théâtre des Nouveautés
- 1883: Le Roi de carreau (Eugène Leterrier and Albert Vanloo), Théâtre des Nouveautés
- 1884: Le Château de Tire-Larigot (Ernest Blum and Raoul Toché), Théâtre des Nouveautés
- 1885: Le Petit Chaperon rouge (opérette by Gaston Serpette, words of Ernest Blum and Raoul Toché), Théâtre des Nouveautés
- 1886: Adam et Ève (Ernest Blum and Raoul Toché), Théâtre des Nouveautés
- 1887: L'Amour mouillé (Jules Prével and Armand Liorat), Théâtre des Nouveautés
- 1887: Les Saturnales (Albin Valabrègue), Théâtre des Nouveautés
- 1888: La Volière (music by Lecocq; words by Charles Nuitter and Alexandre Beaume), Théâtre des Nouveautés
- 1888: Le Puits qui parle (opéra comique by Audran, words by Alexandre Beaume and Paul Burani), Théâtre des Nouveautés
- 1889: La Vénus d'Arles (opéra comique by Louis Varney, livret by Paul Ferrier and Armand Liorat), Théâtre des Nouveautés
- 1889: Le Royaume des femmes (Ernest Blum and Raoul Toché), Théâtre des Nouveautés
