= Lurine =

Lurine is the name of:

- Louis Lurine (1812–1860), 19th-century French homme de lettres
- Lurine Cato (born 1974), vocalist
