= Le Baromètre =

Le Baromètre, ou la Pluie et le Beau Temps is a two-act French vaudeville written by Eugène Labiche, in collaboration with Auguste Lefranc and Marc-Michel, premiered in Paris at the Théâtre du Vaudeville 1 August 1848.

The play was not published.
