= Le Jour et la Nuit (opera) =

1881 opera by Charles lecocq

Poster for original production

Le Jour et la Nuit (French pronunciation: [lə ʒuʁ e la nɥi], Day and Night) is an opéra-bouffe with a libretto by Albert Vanloo and Eugène Leterrier and music by Charles Lecocq. It was first performed in Paris on 5 November 1881, ran for 193 performances and was subsequently staged at other theatres in Europe, North America and Australia. It has not remained in the regular international operatic repertoire.

The opera depicts the confused events and various assumed identities surrounding the wedding night of a Portuguese aristocrat.

== Background and first performances ==
Since La Fille de Madame Angot (1872), Lecocq had been successful throughout the 1870s in what the critic Robert Pourvoyeur calls "the same elegantly risqué mould – the wedding night more or less thwarted". A list of the gross takings of productions in Paris during the two decades from 1870, published in 1891, showed La fille de Madame Angot as the most successful opera by any composer in that time, earning more than two million francs; (Note: About €8,826,363 in 2015 purchasing value.) his Giroflé-Girofla (1874) took nearly three-quarters of a million and La Petite Mariée (1875) was not far behind. In the 1880s he continued in his usual vein, but after the early years of the decade his works became less popular, and Le Jour et la Nuit was one of his last real successes.

Having fallen out with the management of the Théâtre de la Renaissance, where his works were premiered in the 1870s, Lecocq chose the Théâtre des Nouveautés for his new work. His choice caused some surprise, as the theatre, run by the actor-manager Jules Brasseur, had no reputation for opérette or opéra-bouffe, and was distinguished by the sometimes indelicate content of its productions.

Lecocq, usually a slow and painstaking composer, produced the score for the new work in what was for him the short space of two months, but it was well received and was judged by the critics to show no signs of hasty composition. To enhance the production Brasseur recruited the rising young singer Marguerite Ugalde from the Opéra-Comique as his leading lady, and commissioned lavish costumes and scenery.

The opera ran for 193 performances in its original production in Paris, taking more than half-a-million francs at the box office. (Note: About €2,480,318 in 2015 purchasing value.)

== Roles ==
Roles, premiere cast
Role	Premiere cast 5 November 1881
Manola	Marguerite Ugalde
Don Braseiro, governor of a Portuguese province	Jean-François Berthelier
Don Dégomez, his cousin	M. Scipion
Miguel, his steward	Achille-Félix Montaubry
Prince Picrates de Calabazas, prime minister of Portugal	Jules Brasseur
Béatrix	Juliette Darcourt
Sanchette, an innkeeper	M^{lle} Piccolo
Cristoval, her waiter	M. Matrat

== Synopsis ==
Marguerite Ugalde as Manola

The plot is set in Portugal at the time of Louis XIII.

=== Act 1 ===
The castle of Don Braseiro de Trás o Montes

Don Braseiro is eagerly awaiting the arrival of his new bride. He is too busy guarding the border against the predatory Spanish to have time to go to Lisbon in search of a bride, and has delegated the task to his cousin, Don Dégomez, who has chosen a suitable candidate and, as Braseiro's proxy, stood in at the wedding ceremony.

Flushed with pleasure at matrimony, Braseiro willingly grants his steward, Miguel, permission to marry. The Spaniards attack the Portuguese outposts. Don Braseiro can wait no longer for his wife; he leaves to lead his army against the enemy. Manola, Miguel's fiancée arrives, fleeing from the unwelcome attentions of Prince Picrates de Calabazas, the Portuguese prime minister. He arrives in hot pursuit, and to prevent his further advances, Manola pretends to be Don Braseiro's wife.

Nonplussed and disappointed, Calabazas is ready to leave. Braseiro, who has obtained a truce with the Spanish by means of judicious bribery, returns full of ardour, keen to meet his new wife. At the sight of Manola, he declares himself delighted. He insists that Calabazas should be his guest overnight, and then readies himself to consummate his marriage. Béatrix, the real new wife, arrives and is intercepted by Manola – whom she knows well – and Miguel, who explain the situation. She agrees, despite some misgivings, to help them by passing herself off as a lady companion. In the evening, taking advantage of the darkness, she enters the nuptial chamber, while Manola slips out by another door.

=== Act 2 ===
The grounds of Don Braseiro's castle

The wedding night has gone well. Braseiro is delighted with his wife. He has not registered that the blonde Manola has been replaced by the brunette Béatrix, though he wonders why his bride has such an inexplicable dislike of daylight. Calabazas, preparing to leave, encounters Béatrix, whom he has not met before. He immediately falls for her. To save the situation, Manola plays the seductress with him, arranging a rendezvous in the dovecote in the castle grounds. Once Calabazas has climbed the ladder into the dovecote, Miguel and Manola remove the ladder, leaving Calabazas stranded, and run off.

=== Act 3 ===
The courtyard of an inn

Braseiro enters, accompanied by Béatrix, her face hidden under a mantilla, so that her husband does not realise the deception. Miguel, disguised as a peasant and Manola, disguised as a mule-driver, arrive, closely followed by Calabazas. He recognises them and tells Braseiro that his wife is betraying him with Miguel. There is a general confrontation. The conspirators explain the deception and the reasons for it. Don Braseiro is satisfied with their explanation and very happy with Béatrix as his bride. Calabazas's vengeance is forestalled by a dispatch announcing that the king, tired of his prime minister's frequent absences in amorous adventures, has dismissed him from office. Both pairs of lovers are happy, and Calabazas consoles himself with the willing charms of Sanchette, the innkeeper.

== Musical numbers ==
Overture
Act 1
- Introduction: Chorus "Nous attendons le Seigneur Intendant"
- Scène "Un intendant, la chose est sûre" (Anita)
- Couplets "Seigneur, je sais broder" (Anita, Catana, Pépita)
- Romance "Sous le regard de deux grands yeux" (Miguel)
- Couplets "Mon cher ami, sache bien qu'ici bas" (Braseiro)
- Couplets "Comme l'oiseau qui fuit effarouché" (Manola)
- Couplets "Les femmes ne m'en parlez pas" (Calabazas)
- Ensemble: "A notre nouvelle maîtresse"
- Scène "A mon tour de me présenter" (Calabazas)
- Air "Eh bien oui, je suis la baronne (Manola)
- Duet "Tuons-nous, tuons-nous" (Miguel, Manola)
- Couplets "Certainement, c'est bien charmant" (Béatrix)
- Finale: O grand St Michel" (Manola, Béatrix, Miguel), Chorus and scène "La nuit enchanteresse", Ballade de la Lune "O mon épouse, Ô mon trésor" (Braseiro, Manola, Béatrix, Miguel).

Act 2
- Entr'acte – Romance "Laisse-moi rallumer, ma belle" (Miguel)
- Sérénade-bouffe "En toute circonstance" (les cornettes)
- Couplets "Voyez, elle est charmante" (Manola)
- Chansons du Romarin "Ma mèr' m'a dit" (Manola), chanson du Fourniment "Y avait un' fois un militaire" (Manola)
- Chanson-duo "Un rossignol rencontre une fauvette" (Manola, Béatrix)
- Chorus – "Puisqu'il parait que le grand prince", Ensemble "O moment suprême!
- Couplets "Les Portugais sont toujours gais" (Calabazas, Chorus)
- Ensemble du parasol "Qu'on m'apporte mon parasol" (Calabazas)
- Mélodie "J'ai vu le jour dans le pays" (Manola-Calabazas)
- Scène "Vous savez charmer les serpents" (Calabazas, Manola)
- Chanson indienne "Le serpent dort sur la mousse (Manola)
- Couplets-Duetto "Adieu donc, Prince charmant" (Miguel-Manola)
- Finale 2: "On appelle" (all)

Act 3
- Entr'acte
- Introduction: Chorus "Ohé l'hôtelière," Boléro "En Portugal, les Portugaises" (Chorus)
- Couplets de l'hôtelière "Mon cabaret, entre nous, je m'en vante" (Sanchette)
- Couplets "Je passais un jour dans la rue" (Braseiro)
- Duet "Nous sommes deux amoureux " (Manola, Miguel)
- Air du muletier "Si je mène par le chemin" (Manola)
- Quartet "C'était la demoiselle de compagnie" (Manola, Béatrix, Miguel, Braseiro) et couplets "Il est deux choses ici bas" (Manola-Béatrix)
- Chorus "C'est un courrier" and couplet finale "Messieurs, on attend votre arrêt" (all)

== Revivals ==
Le Jour et la Nuit was staged in New York with the title Manola, on 6 February 1882, and in London, under the same title, five days later. Both productions used an English adaptation by Henry Farnie. Productions followed in Belgium, Austria, Switzerland and the Netherlands during 1882, (Note: "Waifs", (Note: 'Waifs' is an archaic term for 'miscellanea'.) The Musical World, 18 February 1882, p. 110; Gänzl & Lamb 1988, p. 389; Cole 1999, p. 186 and "Waifs", The Musical World, 22 April 1882, p. 246) Australia and Italy in 1883, Spain in 1884 (Note: "Waifs", The Musical World, 12 January 1884, p. 30) and Canada in 1885.

The opera has only occasionally been revived in Paris (1897, 1920 and 1923) but continued for many years to be popular in the French provinces and Belgium. A French radio recording (with dialogue) with Liliane Berton as Manola, Lina Dachary as Béatrix, Henri Bedex as Prince Calabazas, Gaston Rey as Don Braseiro and Michel Hamel as Miguel and the radio-lyrique orchestra conducted by Roger Ellis was issued in 1990.

== Critical reception ==
Reviewing the premiere, the Paris correspondent of The Era, commented that Lecocq had "produced nothing prettier or more attractive since the Fille de Madame Angot made his name". The reviewer singled out as the "gems of the piece", three successive numbers for Manola in act 2: a village song, a military number and finally a duet with the concealed Béatrix, "The Nightingale and the Linnet". Other reviewers concurred that the composer was in his best form: "Seldom, if ever, has anything more graceful and sparkling emanated from his pen"; "melodic invention and masterly orchestration … not an opéra-bouffe but a legitimate comic opera of the school in which Auber was pre-eminent". When the work was revived in Paris in 1897, Le guide musical remarked that Lecocq's score showed up "the lack of invention and the sloppiness of our current operetta composers".

Reviewing the English adaptation, The Athenaeum observed, "The original libretto of MM. Leterrier and Vanloo is more than ordinarily indelicate, and Mr. Farnie has had to exercise his inventive faculty as well as considerable tact in his adaptation." The New York Times concurred: "While not exactly adapted for performance at a Sunday-school or young ladies' boarding school, it is not of such breadth as to be objectionable in English."

In modern times, Andrew Lamb, in a 2000 study of musical theatre has written that Le Jour et la Nuit has a delightfully tuneful score, with a hit number "the rhythmically invigorating 'Les Portugais sont toujours gai'".

== Notes, references and sources ==
=== Sources ===
- Cole, Richard (1999). La vie musicale au Grand Théâtre de Genève entre 1879 et 1918. Geneva: Éditions Universelles, Conservatoire de Musique. ISBN 978-2-88433-011-4.
- Gänzl, Kurt; Lamb, Andrew (1988). Gänzl's Book of the Musical Theatre. London: The Bodley Head. OCLC 966051934.
- Lamb, Andrew (2000). 150 Years of Popular Musical Theatre. New Haven and London: Yale University Press. ISBN 978-0-300-07538-0 – via Internet Archive.
