= Perrichon =

Perrichon is a French surname. Notable people with the surname include:

- Julien Perrichon (1566–c. 1600), composer and lutist of the late Renaissance
- Miguel Perrichon (born 1941), Argentine football player

== Fictional characters ==
- Monseiur Perrichon, a wealthy coachbuilder and the titular character of the comic play The Voyage of Mr. Perrichon

== See also ==
- Perichron, periapsis of an orbit around Saturn
