= Violet Cameron =

English actress and singer (1862–1919)

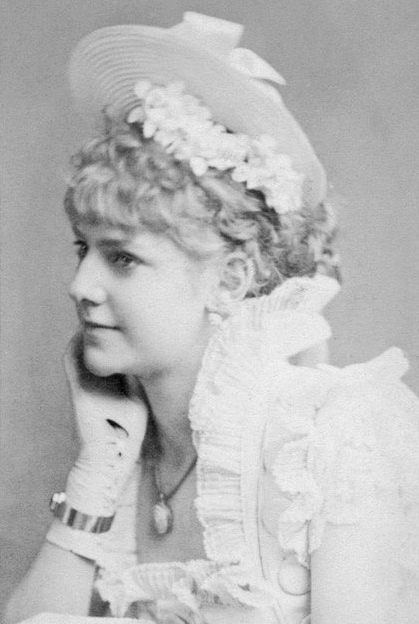
Violet Cameron in 1876

Violet Lydia Thompson (7 December 1862 – 25 October 1919), known professionally as Violet Cameron, was an English actress and singer who gained fame in Robert Planquette's operettas Les cloches de Corneville and Rip Van Winkle, and Francis Chassaigne's opéra bouffe Falka, and notoriety for her affair with Hugh Lowther, 5th Earl of Lonsdale.

== Biography ==
Cameron was born in London in 1862 to Mary Josephine (née Brougham) and William Melfington Thompson, a linen merchant. Her "aunt" was the Victorian burlesque actress and dancer Lydia Thompson.

She made her stage début in 1871 at the age of 9 in the part of Karl in Boucicault's Faust and Marguerite. She also appeared as a child in the Drury Lane Theatre's Christmas pantomimes. She also played at the Adelphi Theatre and the Globe. In 1876 she created the role of Joconde at the Criterion Theatre in H. B. Farnie's burlesque Piff Paff and soon played Perdita in A Winter's Tale in Liverpool. Later in the year, she was engaged at the Folly Theatre, where she appeared in burlesque and opéra bouffe productions, including Polly in Farnie's burlesque of Robinson Crusoe, Pearlina in an adaptation of Charles Lecocq called Sea Nymphs, Antoinette in Farnie and Robert Reece's adaptation of Jacques Offenbach's La créole. Her greatest success at the Folly came in 1878 as Germaine in the long-running British premiere of Robert Planquette's Les cloches de Corneville.

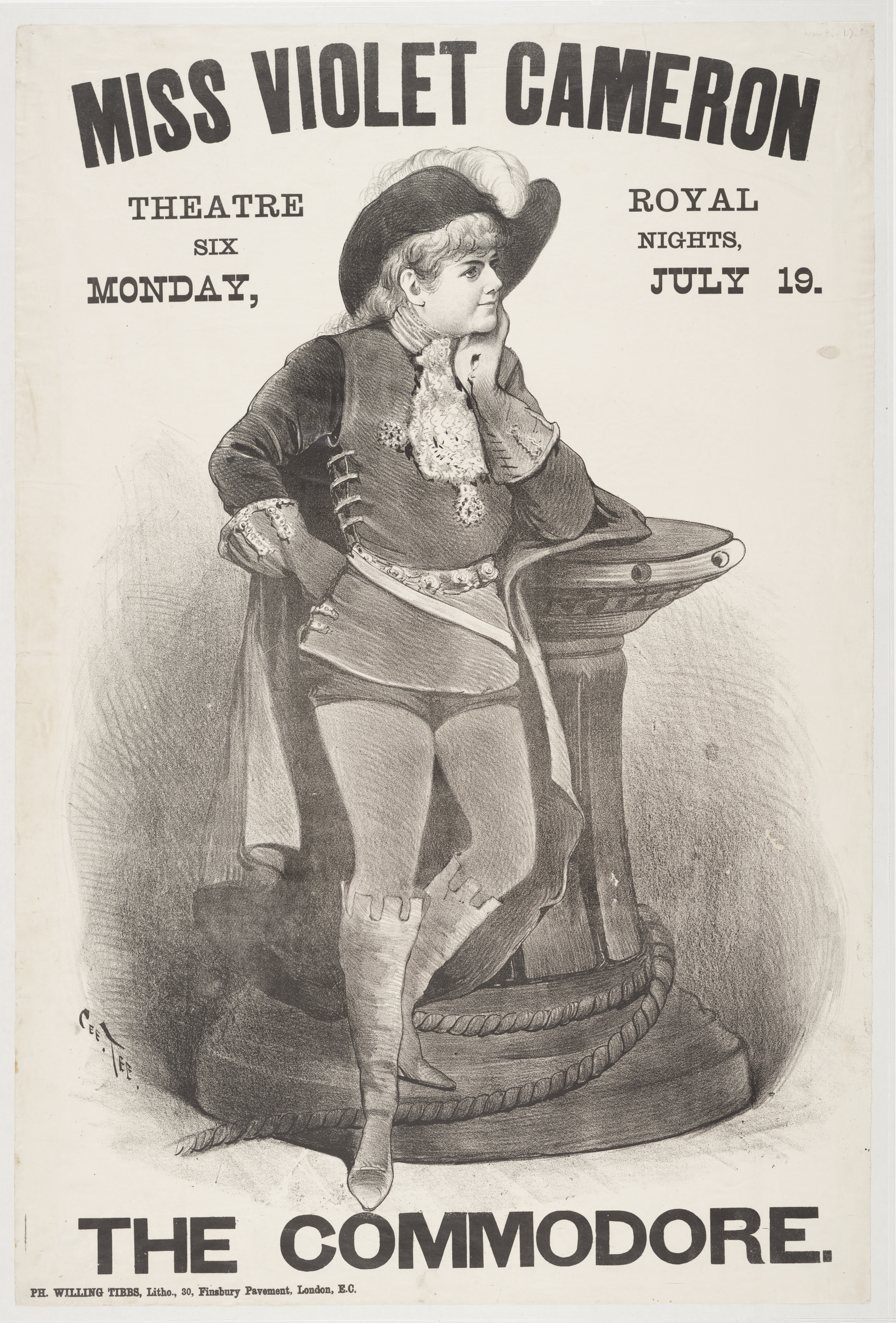
Cameron in The Commodore at Edinburgh's Royal Lyceum Theatre, 1886

Cameron then moved to the Strand Theatre, where she appeared in Farnie's burlesque, Nemesis and then played Suzanne in his translation of Offenbach's Madame Favart (1879). In 1881, she moved to Alexander Henderson's Comedy Theatre, where she sang the title role in Edmond Audran's The Mascot and had another great success in 1882 as Gretchen in Planquette's Rip Van Winkle. In 1883, she sang the title roles in Von Suppé's Boccaccio and Chassaigne's Falka. This was followed by other light operas at the Comedy. In 1885, she was engaged at the Avenue Theatre, where she played the lead in Bad Boys, an adaptation of the French piece Clara Soleil, and created the role of Dudley in Reece and Farnie's Kenilworth. The following year, she created the title role in Farnie's burlesque of Lurline.

In September 1884 she married the Moroccan tea taster David de Bensaude with whom she had one child. In 1886 Cameron and Bensaude were befriended by Hugh Lowther, the Earl of Lonsdale, who offered to fund their plan to take their theatre company to the United States. Bensaude soon became jealous, and Cameron filed for a legal separation, on grounds of cruelty, while Bensaude counter-filed for divorce on grounds of adultery. The affair became a sensation and scandal in the press, including the American press during the 1886 American tour. In 1887 Cameron gave birth to Lonsdale's child, and the two had a second daughter. In the same year she played Dolly in a revival of Cellier's The Sultan of Mocha at the Strand Theatre.

In 1893, Cameron played Ethel Sportington in the musical comedy Morocco Bound. Cameron continued to perform until 1903. Her last role was the Mother Superior in the Edwardian musical comedy The School Girl.

After a short illness she died in Worthing in Sussex on 25 October 1919 and is buried at Broadwater cemetery, Worthing.
