= Auguste Lefranc =

French playwright and journalist

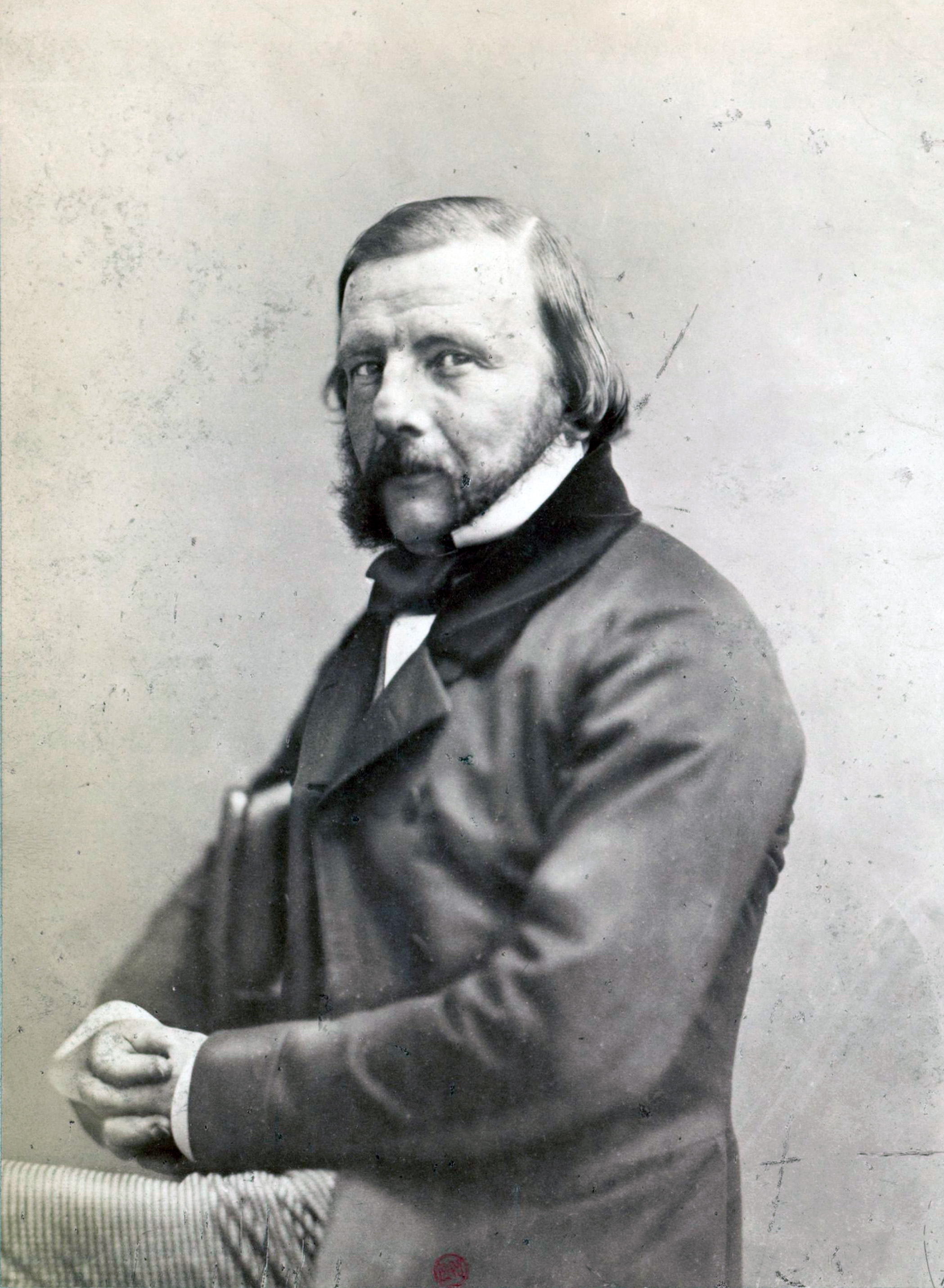
- Born: Pierre-Charles-Joseph-Auguste Lefranc; 2 February 1814; Bussières, Saône-et-Loire, France
- Died: 15 December 1878 (aged 64); Suresnes, Seine, France
- Occupations: Playwright, journalist

Pierre-Charles-Joseph-Auguste Lefranc (2 February 1814 – 15 December 1878) was a 19th-century French playwright and journalist.

== Biography ==
After secondary studies in Mâcon, he moved to Paris in order to attend law school. There he met Eugène Labiche and Marc-Michel. He obtained his license and registered with the Bar but did not practice law for long, becoming more interested in writing. He worked with small newspapers and founded l'Audience and La Chaire catholique. But his passion was theater.

Through his cousin Eugène Scribe, who then dominated the French playwriting scene, he received helpful advice and support from theatre directors. His first play, a comédie en vaudevilles in one act titled Une femme tombée du ciel, premiered in 1836 at the Théâtre du Panthéon. In 1838, Labiche, Lefranc and Marc-Michel founded the "Paul Dandré Dramatic Society", a collective literary pseudonym for the production of comedies and dramas. A contract formally linked the three theatrical newcomers, who agreed to write only for their new partnership. While the experience lasted only two years, it ended amicably. Labiche, in a letter to Nadar, however, blamed the dissolution on Lefranc's "laziness and inaccuracy".

Over the next two decades, Lefranc wrote fifty more comedies, mostly with Labiche (the last, L'Avocat d'un Grec, in 1859).. Except for Embrassons-nous, Folleville! (1850), which was refashioned into an opéra-comique with music by Avelino Valenti and successfully performed at the second Salle Favart in 1879, none of his plays is considered significant, and many were not even published. He then changed careers, becoming a banker by taking over the Caisse du Crédit public A. Lefranc and Cie.

From 8 July 1867 until mid 1868 Lefranc was a co-director of the Théâtre des Bouffes-Parisiens, along with Julien-Joseph-Henry Dupontavisse. During their tenure the theatre temporarily presented comédies en vaudevilles.

He died on 15 December 1878 in his country house in Suresnes.

== Works ==
=== Theatre ===
- 1836: Une femme tombée du ciel
- 1837: La Cuvette d'eau (with Eugène Labiche and Marc-Michel)
- 1838 :
  - Monsieur de Coyllin ou l'Homme infiniment poli (with Labiche and Marc-Michel)
  - Le Capitaine d'Arcourt ou la Fée du château (with Labiche and Marc-Michel)
  - L'Avocat Loubet (with Labiche and Marc-Michel)
- 1839:
  - La Forge des châtaigniers (with Labiche and Marc-Michel)
  - La Peine du Talion (with Labiche and Marc-Michel)
  - L'Article 960 ou la Donation (with Labiche, Marc-Michel and Lancelot)
- 1840:
  - Le Fin Mot (with Labiche and Marc-Michel)
  - Le Lierre et l'Ormeau (with Labiche and Albert Monnier)
  - Si nos femmes le savaient ! (with Philippe de Marville)
- 1841: Un grand criminel (with Charles Varin and Jacques Arago)
- 1842: Les Circonstances atténuantes (with Labiche and Mélesville)
- 1843:
  - L'Homme de paille (with Labiche)
  - Une femme compromise
- 1844:
  - Le Major Cravachon (with Labiche and Paul Jessé)
  - Deux papas très bien ou la Grammaire de Chicard (with Labiche)
- 1845:
  - Le Roi des Frontins (with Labiche)
  - L'École buissonnière (with Labiche)
- 1846:
  - Mademoiselle ma femme (with Labiche)
  - Rocambolle le bateleur (with Labiche)
  - Frisette (with Labiche)
  - L'Inventeur de la poudre (with Labiche and Nyon)
- 1847:
  - L'Avocat pédicure (with Labiche and Albitte)
  - La Chasse aux jobards (with Labiche)
  - Une existence décolorée
  - Un homme sanguin (with Labiche)
  - L'Art de ne pas donner d'étrennes (with Labiche)
- 1848:
  - L'Enfant de quelqu'un, comédie-vaudeville in 2 acts, premiered in London during a tour of the troupe of the Théâtre du Palais-Royal.
  - Le Baromètre, ou la Pluie et le Beau Temps (with Labiche and Marc-Michel)
  - A moitié chemin (with Labiche and Marc-Michel)
  - Le Club champenois (with Labiche)
  - Une tragédie chez M. Grassot (with Labiche)
  - À bas la famille ou les Banquets (with Labiche)
- 1849:
  - Les Manchettes d'un vilain (with Labiche and Saint-Yves)
  - Un monsieur qui pose (with Labiche and Philippe de Marville)
  - Une dent sous Louis XV (with Labiche)
  - Trompe-la-balle (with Labiche)
- 1850:
  - Les Prétendus de Gimblette (with Labiche, Marc-Michel and Matharel de Fiennes)
  - Embrassons-nous, Folleville ! (with Labiche)
  - Les Roués innocents
  - Une idée fixe
- 1851: En manches de chemise (with Labiche and Nyon)
- 1852: Piccolet (with Labiche and Armand Montjoye)
- 1853: Un ut de poitrine (with Labiche)
- 1854: Un mauvais coucheur
- 1855: Les Précieux (with Labiche and Marc-Michel)
- 1859: L'Avocat d'un grec (with Labiche)

== Bibliography ==
- Letellier, Robert Ignatius (2010). Opéra-Comique: A Sourcebook. Newcastle upon Tyne: Cambridge Scholars. ISBN 9781443821407.
- Wild, Nicole ([1989]). Dictionnaire des théâtres parisiens au XIXe siècle: les théâtres et la musique. Paris: Aux Amateurs de livres. ISBN 9780828825863. ISBN 9782905053800 (paperback). View formats and editions at WorldCat.
- Wild, Nicole; Charlton, David (2005). Théâtre de l'Opéra-Comique Paris: répertoire 1762-1972. Sprimont, Belgium: Editions Mardaga. ISBN 9782870098981.
