= Albert Brasseur =

French actor

Brasseur, c. 1900

Albert Brasseur (French pronunciation: [albɛʁ bʁasœʁ]) was the stage name of the French actor Jules Cyrille Albert Dumont (12 February 1860 – 13 May 1932).

The son of a successful Parisian actor manager, Jules Brasseur, he was intended for a military career, but a successful appearance in a small role in one of his father's productions led him to become an actor. Like his father, he was known for comic roles. After Jules Brasseur died in 1890, Albert joined the company of the Théâtre des Variétés, Paris, where he remained for most of his career, appearing in non-musical comedies and in opérettes by Offenbach and others. He retired at the age of 70, and died two years later.

== Life and career ==
=== Early years ===
Brasseur was born on 12 February 1860 in the 11th arrondissement of Paris, the son of the actor-manager Jules Brasseur. He was educated at the Lycée Condorcet and was destined for a military career, but in December 1879, while studying for the entrance examinations for the army college at Saint-Cyr, he took a small part in a production at his father's theatre, the Théâtre des Nouveautés, Paris. As Ernest, a young college student, in Fleur d'oranger a vaudeville by Alfred Hennequin and Victor Bernard. he made such a success that he abandoned thoughts of a becoming an army officer and remained a member of the Nouveautés company until his father's death in 1890. There he appeared in productions including La Cantinière by Robert Planquette (1880), L'Oiseau bleu by Henri Chivot and Alfred Duru (1884), Le Voyage en Amérique by Hervé (1880), La Vie mondaine by Charles Lecocq (1885), Serment d'amour by Maurice Ordonneau (1886), Adam et Ève by Ernest Blum and Raoul Toché (1886) and La Lycéenne by Georges Feydeau and Gaston Serpette (1887).

In a survey of Parisian actors and actresses published in 1899, Émile Abraham wrote that Albert Brasseur was the worthy son of Brasseur senior, and often vied with him in comic originality, sometimes elegant, sometimes pleasingly sentimental and at other times "indulging in the most extravagant fantasy".

Jules Brasseur, left, as the diplomat and the Brazilian in La Vie parisienne (1866) and Albert Brasseur in the same roles (1892)

=== Théâtre des Variétés ===
In 1891 Brasseur joined the company of the Théâtre des Variétés, appearing first in a revue, Paris port de mer by Henri Blondeau and Hector Monréal. The following year he played in a range of productions, including Offenbach's La Vie parisienne in which he played four roles: the rich Brazilian, the shoemaker, the shady major, and the diplomat. Jules Brasseur had created two of these roles in the original 1866 production, and Les Annales du théâtre et de la musique reported that Brasseur fils "so adept at changing his faces, happily renders the roles according to his father's traditions, and amuses today's audiences tremendously".

Plays in which Brasseur starred at the Variétés included Feydeau's Le Circuit, Le Pompier de service (The fireman on duty, by Paul Gavault, 1897), La Veine, Le Nouveau Jeu, Education de prince, Les deux ecoles, Miquette et sa mère, L'amour en banque, Le Faux pas, M. De la Pallice, Le bonheur, Mesdames, Le Bois sacré, Le roi, L'habit vert and J'veux avoir un enfant. He was also well known for his performances in musical shows, including Offenbach's Les Brigands, La Belle Hélène and Orphée aux Enfers.

=== Later years ===
Brasseur made some appearances outside France. Together with Jeanne Granier and Lucien Guitry he appeared at the Garrick Theatre, London in June 1902; he toured in South America in 1910; and appeared at the London Coliseum in 1915 in Le Brésilien, and Le Bureau de Poste. In September 1927 he was appointed a chevalier of the Legion of Honour. He made his last appearances at the Théâtre du Palais-Royal, Paris, and retired from the stage in 1930.

Brasseur died at his house at Maisons-Laffitte, on the fringes of Paris, aged 72. He left a widow, the singer and actress Juliette Darcourt, whom he married in 1918.

== References and sources ==
=== Sources ===
- Abraham, Emile (1899). Acteurs & actrices de Paris. Paris: La librairie nouvelle. OCLC 1117564437.
- Germain, Auguste (1898). Albert Brasseur. Paris: Juven. OCLC 560080821.
- Noël, Edouard; Edmond Stoullig (1894). Les Annales du théâtre et de la musique, 1893. Paris: Charpentier. OCLC 172996346.
- Parker, John, ed. (1922). Who's Who in the Theatre (fourth ed.). London: Sir Isaac Pitman and Sons. OCLC 473894893.
