= Un mouton à l'entresol =

Un mouton à l'entresol is a one-act comedy by Eugène Labiche, in collaboration with Albéric Second, premiered at the théâtre du Palais-Royal in Paris on 30 April 1875.

== Cast of the premiere ==
Role	Actor/actress
Eustache Falingard, Fougallas' servant	Brasseur
Fougallas	Lhéritier
Rampicot, military surgeon	Pellerin
Emma Fougallas	G. Olivier
Marianne, Mme Fougallas's housemaid	Z. Reynold
