= Skylark (1934 film) =

1934 film

- Directed by: Jean Tarride
- Written by: Paul Colline; Noël-Noël
- Produced by: Constantin Geftman
- Starring: Noël-Noël; Fernandel; Junie Astor
- Cinematography: Fédote Bourgasoff; Jean-Paul Goreaud
- Edited by: Léonide Moguy
- Music by: Paul Maye; Michel Michelet
- Production company: Vandor Film
- Distributed by: Compagnie Française de Distribution de Films
- Release date: 12 October 1934
- Running time: 80 minutes
- Country: France
- Language: French

Skylark (French: Adémaï aviateur) is a 1934 French comedy film directed by Jean Tarride and starring Noël-Noël, Fernandel and Junie Astor. The character of Adémaï had previously appeared in short films but this was his first feature-length appearance. He subsequently appeared in the historical comedy Adémaï in the Middle Ages in 1935.

== Synopsis ==
Adémaï has joined the French Air Force, but during some leave he finds himself unwillingly engaged to a farmer's daughter. To try and escape this he has himself transferred to pilot training. However Méchelet, the man he mistakenly believes is his training instructor, in fact knows no more about flying than he does. Fearing to try and land the two keep flying, breaking a world record in the process.

== Cast ==
- Noël-Noël as Adémaï
- Fernandel as Méchelet
- Junie Astor as Marguerite
- Sylvia Bataille as Marie-Jeanne
- Paul Azaïs as L'adjudant
- Paul Asselin as Le commandant
- André Nicolle as Le colonel
- Alex Bernard as Le docteur Tallet
- Jean Rousselière as Lucas
- Roger Legris as Un aviateur
- Henri Lévêque as Un aviateur
- Madeleine Guitty as Madame Morlot
- Teddy Michaud as Un aviateur
- Marcel Barencey as Morlot

== Bibliography ==
- Crisp, Colin. French Cinema—A Critical Filmography: Volume 1, 1929-1939. Indiana University Press, 2015.
- Merigeau, Pascal. Jean Renoir: A Biography. Hachette, 2017 .
- Rège, Philippe. Encyclopedia of French Film Directors, Volume 1. Scarecrow Press, 2009.
- Sadoul, Georges. French Film. Arno Press, 1972.
