= The Italian Straw Hat (play) =

Comedy by Eugène Labiche and Marc-Michel

Scene from the play, published 1856

The Italian Straw Hat (Un chapeau de paille d'Italie) is a five-act comedy by Eugène Labiche and Marc-Michel. It premiered at the Théâtre du Palais-Royal in Paris on 14 August 1851. It has been adapted for the cinema in French, English, German, Czech and Russian, and as a musical play in English and Italian versions. The piece remains regularly staged in France, where it entered the repertoire of the Comédie-Française in Paris and of theatres in other French cities.

== Plot ==
The play is set in Paris in the middle of the 19th century, on the morning of the day on which Fadinard, a well-to-do bachelor, is to marry Hélène Nonancourt, daughter of a suburban market-gardener. Hélène, together with her cantankerous father and a fleet of eight cabs full of wedding guests, is on her way. Fadinard has ridden ahead to make final arrangements. On the way, his horse has eaten a straw hat hung on a bush. The hat belonged to Anaïs, an ex-girlfriend of Fadinard's, who has been dallying behind the bush with her lover, Émile. She and Émile have followed Fadinard to his house, and they insist on a replacement hat, explaining that Anaïs's husband is obsessively jealous and would demand to know the circumstances in which she lost her original hat.

Just as Fadinard rushes out in search of a replacement, Hélène and the wedding-party arrive. Assuming that he is on his way to the ceremony, they get back into their cabs and follow him. Fadinard discovers that finding an identical hat is not as easy as he imagined. His search first takes him to a milliner (Clara), a former girlfriend of his whom he had abandoned, where the wedding guests take her 60-year-old clerk to be the mayor of Paris, then to an aristocrat (la baronne de Champigny), and then to a bachelor (Achille de Rosalba); on each occasion, the wedding party arrives hot on his heels. The chase ends outside Fadinard's house when one of the wedding-guests, his old uncle, Vézinet, produces his present, an Italian straw hat identical to the one eaten by the horse: the wedding is saved and the play ends in general celebration.

== Original cast ==
- Fadinard – Pierre-Alfred Ravel
- Nonancourt – Paul Grassot (fr)
- Beauperthuis – Lhéritier (fr)
- Vezinet – Amant (fr)
- Tardiveau – Jean-François Kalekaire (fr)
- Bobin – Joseph Schey (fr)
- Émile Tavernier – Valaire
- Félix – Augustin
- Achille de Rosalba – Jules Lacourière (fr)
- A corporal – Floridor
- A domestic servant – Andrieux
- Hélène – Marie-Mathilde Chauvière
- Anaïs – Mme. Berger
- La baronne de Champigny – Pauline
- Clara – Cécile Azimont (fr)
- Virginie – Mlle. Gallois
- A chambermaid – Mlle. Chollet

Source: Les archives du spectacle.

== Revivals and adaptations ==
Poster for 1889 revival

=== French productions ===
In the 80 years after its creation there were more than 100 productions of the play throughout France. It was taken into the repertoire of the Comédie-Française in 1938, under the direction of Gaston Baty, and has remained there ever since. It has been revived by other companies in Paris and other French cities in more than 30 new productions, and has been presented several times in every decade from the 1930s onwards.

=== British productions ===
The first version in English was given under the title A Leghorn Bonnet, at the Adelphi Theatre in 1852. That adaptation, by John Oxenford, retained Paris as the setting. It closed after 11 performances, and the play became more familiar to London audiences in the original French version, which Ravel and his company played at the St James's Theatre in 1867, and again in 1871.

In 1873 W. S. Gilbert adapted the original as The Wedding March. (Note: The play was billed in the London papers as "A Wedding March", but Gilbert used the definite article when it appeared in print in his collected plays.) He wrote his version under the pen name of "F. Latour Tomline", moving the action to London and suppressing the adulterous aspect of the original. That version was a box-office success, but Gilbert's later adaptation as a musical play, Haste to the Wedding (1892), with music by George Grossmith, achieved only a short run.

An English translation by Thomas Walton was presented by the Old Vic company in 1952 with Laurence Payne as Fadinard. A translation by Lynn and Theodore Hoffman entitled An Italian Straw Hat was staged by the Edinburgh Gateway Company in 1962. A London West End production in 1987 starred Tom Conti; the adaptation by Ray Cooney followed the original plot but broadened the comedy somewhat.

=== North American productions ===
An American adaptation, titled The Straw Hat was given in New York by the American Laboratory Theatre company in 1926. The Parisian setting was retained, but the characters were given pseudo-French names like "Baroness Crème de la Crème" and "Gillette Rapide". A later American adaptation, Horse Eats Hat by Edwin Denby and Orson Welles, was presented at Maxine Elliott's Theatre in 1936, with Joseph Cotten in the lead role. The Parisian setting was dropped, and the characters had English names such as "Entwistle" and "Mugglethorpe". The Stratford Festival staged a production in 1971 starring Robin Gammell, Tony Van Bridge and Dinah Christie. It ran for 36 performances during the Festival's summer season.

=== Film and broadcasts ===
René Clair directed a silent film of the play in 1927, with Albert Préjean as Fadinard. A German film adaptation, Der Florentiner Hut, was directed by Wolfgang Liebeneiner in 1939, and starred Heinz Rühmann. Another French version followed in 1941, starring Fernandel as Fadinard. It was also made as a French TV movie directed by François Goetghebeur in 2016. A Russian film was made in 1974, titled The Straw Hat (Соломенная шляпка), directed by Leonid Kvinikhidze and starring Andrei Mironov.

The BBC has broadcast television and radio versions of the piece. On radio, Laurence Payne and Geraldine McEwan featured in 1960, and in 1969 John Moffatt starred as Fadinard in Glyn Dearman's translation. In 1968 BBC television showed a new version of the play, adapted by Caryl Brahms and Ned Sherrin, with Patrick Cargill in the lead.

=== Music ===
The Paris production of the original play contained 23 songs, with new words to popular old tunes. This was a proceeding familiar to Gilbert from his burlesques of the 1860s. For his 1873 adaptation he removed all the songs; for the 1892 version he wrote 12 new song lyrics, set by Grossmith. For a 1929 stage production of the play, Jacques Ibert composed incidental music later adapted as the suite Divertissement (1930).

In 1955 the play was adapted by Nino Rota (music) with an Italian-language libretto by the composer and his mother, Ernesta Rota Rinaldi, as the opera The Florentine Straw Hat (Il cappello di paglia di Firenze). The work premiered at the Teatro Massimo in Palermo on 21 April 1955. It was subsequently produced by the Vienna Volksoper (1963), and at the Camden Festival in London in 1980. The work was recorded for the gramophone with the cast and chorus and orchestra of Rome Opera conducted by the composer. A 1998 production at La Scala starred Juan Diego Flórez as Fadinard; a video of that production was released in 1999.

In 2005 the National Ballet of Canada presented an adaptation of the play, choreographed by James Kudelka to an original score by Michael Torke. Variety called it "an effervescent work that barely ever touches the ground".

== Critical assessment ==
Kenneth McLeish, author of a 1996 English translation, describes the play as taking elements from "two of the most popular forms of 19th-century French theatre, vaudeville and the 'well-made' play" and combining them. He summarises vaudevilles as "satirical farce, lampooning the bourgeoisie and using slapstick, dance, song and such stock characters as dodderer, philanderer, pretty girl, jealous husband and peppery soldier"; he contrasts this with "well-made" plays, which centred on a tightly-organised plot in which "the entire action was motivated by some secret involving the main character, a secret revealed only gradually as the play proceeded, until by the final curtain full knowledge had completely changed everyone's lives".

McLeish writes that An Italian Straw Hat, unusually for a farce, "won almost immediate acclaim not only from the public, but from critics and academics alike". It was revived more often than any other of Labiche's plays, and when he published his "Complete Works" in 1878, he placed it first in the first volume.

== Notes, references and sources ==
=== Sources ===
- Gilbert, W. S. (1892). The Wedding March ("Le [sic] Chapeau de Paille d'Italie") – An ecentricity, in three acts. London: Chappell. OCLC 560805358.
- Prokhorov, Alexander (2017). Film and television genres of the late Soviet era. New York: Bloomsbury. ISBN 978-1-5013-2408-6.
- Stedman, Jane W. (1996). W. S. Gilbert, A Classic Victorian & His Theatre. Oxford University Press. ISBN 978-0-19-816174-5.
- Strand, John (2011). Hat!. Broadway Play Publishing. ISBN 978-0881454666.
