= Francis Chassaigne =

French composer

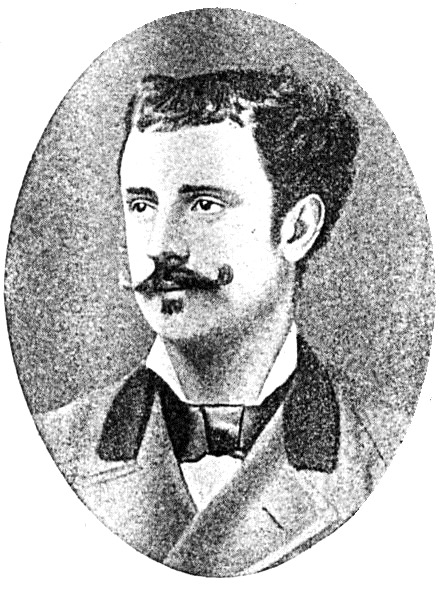
Francis Chassaigne circa 1890

Francis Chassaigne (also known as Francisque Chassaigne) (30 October 1847 – 21 December 1922) was a Belgian-born French composer of operettas, songs, and numerous pieces of dance music for piano. The English-language versions of his operettas, Le droit d'aînesse (1883) and Les noces improvisées (1886) became very popular in Britain and the United States. Chassaigne was married to the Swiss-born operetta singer Louise Roland.

== Biography ==
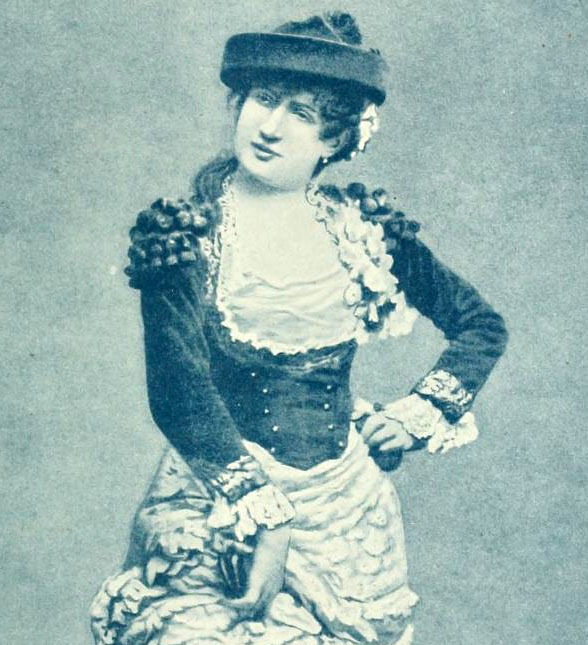
Chassaigne's wife, Louise Roland

Born Désiré-François Chassaigne in Brussels in 1847, Chassaigne studied music there before settling in Paris. His first compositions were popular songs for the operetta stars of the day such as "Jeanne la Sabotière" for Thérésa and "Peureuse" for Louise Théo. By the mid-1870s he had become a prolific composer of one-act opéras bouffes and saynètes (short musical plays) for the café-concerts of Paris, most of which premiered at the Eldorado. In 1882, he was given the chance to compose his first full-length operetta by Jules Brasseur, the director of the Théâtre des Nouveautés. Dedicated to Brasseur, Chassaigne's two-act Le droit d'aînesse with a libretto by Eugène Leterrier and Albert Vanloo premiered at the Nouveautés on 27 January 1883. It was only a partial success, but its English version Falka, with a libretto translated and adapted by Henry Farnie, was popular in English-speaking countries for many years.

His second full-length operetta, Les noces improvisées premiered at the Théâtre des Bouffes-Parisiens on 13 February 1886. The English version, Nadgy (or Nadjy), with a libretto translated and adapted by Alfred Murray premiered at the Casino Theatre in New York on 14 May 1888, and again proved very popular. On the strength of these successes the theatrical producer, Rudolph Aronson, commissioned another opera directly from Chassaigne with the libretto to be written by Henry Farnie. Farnie died in 1889 having completed only an outline of the work, which he had called La Mexicana. In the end, the libretto was written by Max Pemberton, Edgar Smith, and William Lestocq, and called The Brazilian. It premiered at the Theatre Royal in Newcastle upon Tyne on 19 April 1890. Its American premiere followed in October of that year at Aronson's Casino Theatre in New York. However, The Brazilian did not achieve the same success as Falka and Nadgy. According to Aronson's memoirs, Chaissaigne had planned to compose a further operetta for him, based on Louis XIV at Versailles, but this was never completed.

Chassaigne was married to the Swiss-born operetta and vaudeville singer Louise Roland who appeared frequently at the Théâtre des Variétés. Both she and Chassaigne were members of Les Hydropathes, a famous Parisian literary club founded by the French writer Émile Goudeau, many of whose members where singers and stage artists. The daughter of a theatre director, Roland was born in 1851 and began performing at the age of five. She created a number of roles in the operettas of the day and was also an accomplished dancer. After her retirement from the stage, she had a successful career touring as a concert singer, often accompanied on the piano by Chassaigne. In 1912, the couple published Servatoire, described as a three-act comédie vocale (sung comedy). Chassaigne died in Le Raincy in 1922 at the age of 75. Louise Roland died sometime after 1924.

== Works ==
Stage works

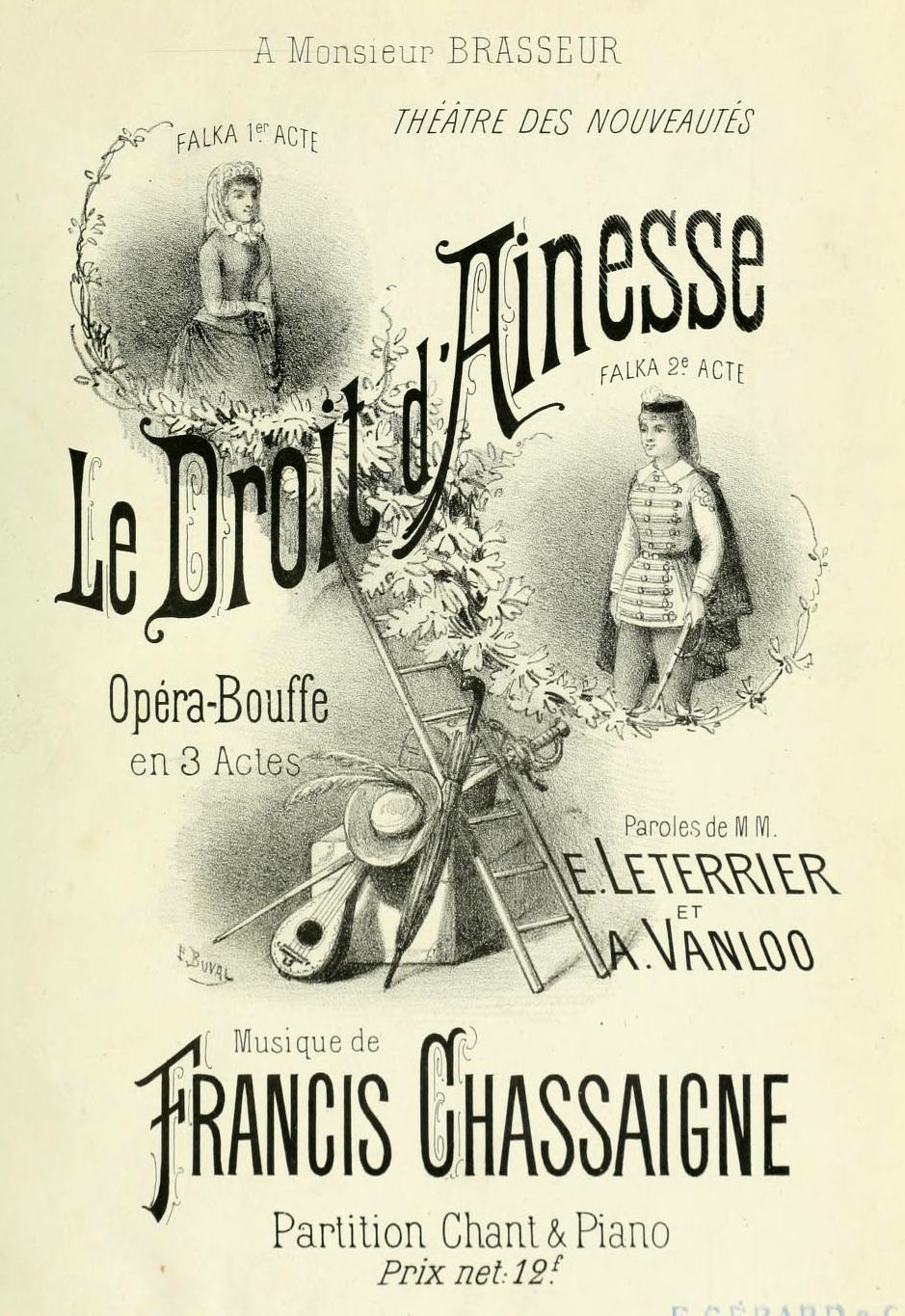
Cover of the piano/vocal score for Le droit d'aînesse, Chassaigne's first full-length operetta

- Un coq en jupons (libretto by Gaston Villemer); premiered at the Alcazar d'Été, 1870
- La bergère de Bougival (libretto by Gaston Villemer and Lucien Delormel); premiered at the Eldorado, 1872
- Les horreurs du carnaval (libretto by Auguste Jouhaud); premiered at the Eldorado, 1873
- Une double clé (libretto by Jules de Rieux); premiered at the Eldorado, 1873
- Monsieur Auguste (libretto by Jules de Rieux); premiered at the Eldorado, 1873
- Le professeur de tyrolienne (libretto by Gaston Villemer and Lucien Delormel); premiered at the Eldorado, 1874
- Un table de café (libretto by Jules de Reiux and A. Guyon); premiered at the Eldorado, 1874
- Deux mauvaises bonnes (libretto by Louis Péricaud and Lucien Delormel); premiered at the Eldorado, 1876
- Les enfants de la balle (libretto by Louis Péricaud and Lucien Delormel); premiered at the Eldorado, 1877
- La famille de Paméla (libretto by Louis Péricaud and Lucien Delormel); premiered at the Eldorado, 1877
- Actéon et le centaure Chiron (libretto by Adolphe de Leuven); premiered at the Théâtre du Palais-Royal, Paris, 24 January 1878
- L'américaine (libretto by Alphonse Siégel); premiered at the Eldorado, 1878
- La tache de sang! (libretto by Gaston Marot); premiered at the Eldorado, 1878
- Le conciergicide (libretto by Hermil and Numès); premiered at the Eldorado, 1879
- Zizi (libretto by Alphonse Siégel); premiered at the Eldorado, 1881
- Le droit d'aînesse (libretto by Eugène Leterrier and Albert Vanloo); premiered at the Théâtre des Nouveautés, Paris, 27 January 1883. The English version, Falka, with a libretto translated and adapted by Henry Farnie premiered at the Comedy Theatre in London on 29 October 1883.
- Les noces improvisées (libretto by Armand Liorat and Albert Fonteny); premiered at the Théâtre des Bouffes-Parisiens, Paris, 13 February 1886. The English version, Nadgy, with a libretto translated and adapted by Alfred Murray premiered at the Casino Theatre in New York on 14 May 1888.
- The Brazilian (libretto by Max Pemberton, Edgar Smith, and William Lestocq); premiered at the Theatre Royal, Newcastle upon Tyne on 19 April 1890

== Sources ==
- Aronson, Rudolph (1913). Theatrical and Musical Memoirs. New York: McBride, Nast and Company
- Caradec, François and Weill, Alain (2007). Le café-concert: 1848-1914. Paris: Fayard. ISBN 2-213-63124-7 (in French)
- Fétis, François-Joseph and Pougin, Arthur (1880). Biographie universelle des musiciens et bibliographie générale de la musique. Paris: Firmin-Didot (in French)
- Gänzl, Kurt (1994). The Encyclopedia of the Musical Theatre, Volume 1. New York: Schirmer Books. ISBN 0-02-871445-8
- Goudeau, Émile (1888/2000). Dix ans de bohème (edited and annotated by Michel Golfier, Jean-Didier Wagneur, Patrick Ramseyer). Seyssel: Champ Vallon, 2000. ISBN 978-2-87673-287-2 (in French)
- Paulus (Jean-Paul Habans) (circa 1906) Trente ans de Café-concert. Paris: Societe d'edition et de publications. (in French)
- Roland, Louise; Chassaigne, Francis; Dreux, Jane Aymard (1912). Servatoire, comédie vocale en 3 actes, en prose rimée et rythmée. Villemomble: H. Réfaud (in French)
