= Albéric Second =

French journalist, novelist and playwright

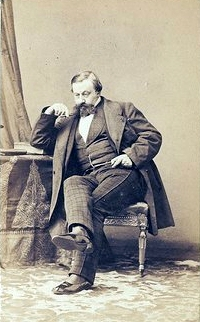
- Photograph by Disdéri in 1860
- Born: Pierre Albéric Second; 17 June 1817; Angoulême, Charente, France
- Died: 2 June 1887 (aged 69); 9th arrondissement of Paris, France
- Occupations: Journalist, novelist and playwright
- Years active: 1836–1885

Pierre Albéric Second (17 June 1817 – 2 June 1887) was a 19th-century French journalist, novelist and playwright.

== Biography ==
The son of a magistrate, Second felt no taste for law and began a literary career. He was successively assistant at Le Charivari, director of l'Entr'acte, co-founder of la Comédie parisienne, editor at Le Figaro, founder of Le Grand Journal with Hippolyte de Villemessant, and columnist at l'Événement before he took over the management of l’Entr’acte in 1870.

During a short period between 1848 and 1850, Second was sub-prefect of the Basses-Alpes department at Castellane. Awarded the Legion of Honour in 1859, he was Imperial commissioner of the Théâtre de l'Odéon from 1865 to 1870. In 1869, Second was commissioned to write the words of the cantata sung at the Opera in honor of the centenary of Napoleon, which is remarkable only for its flat mediocrity.

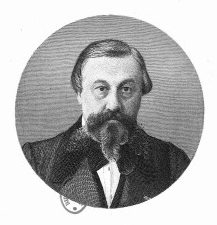
Albéric Second in 1868

Gifted with a light spirit, a fun and easy skill, Second was especially appreciated for his columns. During the Revolution of 1848, he composed a cantata in which each stanza ended with these lines:

Au dernier roi nous avons dit adieu (To the last king we said goodbye)
La France est le soldat de Dieu (France is God's soldier !)

Charles Monselet wrote this portrait of him:

One journalist called him the Dumas of information. That's it. As much apparent ease, as much spirit met by the author of the Musketeers. There was only a revolution that could make him a sub-prefect, and this revolution occurred. One weakness of Mr. Alberic Second is to believe, because he was from Angouleme, he posed for Lucien de Rubempré of the Illusions perdues and Un grand homme de province à Paris .

== Main publications ==
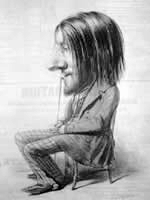
Caricature by Benjamin Roubaud published in Le Charivari in 1838 or 1839

- 1841: Lettres cochinchinoises sur les hommes et les choses du jour écrites à l'empereur de la Chine par trois Mandarins de première classe, traduites par Albéric Second, orientaliste du Charivari
- 1842: Les Mémoires d'un poisson rouge
- 1844: Les Petits Mystères de l'Opéra, illustrated by Paul Gavarni
- 1845: Histoire politique et culinaire de Joseph Sansot, Propriétaire de l'Hôtel de la Paix
- 1853: La Jeunesse dorée par le procédé Ruolz
- 1854: Contes sans prétention
- 1855: La Part du feu
- 1856: À quoi tient l'amour, fantaisies parisiennes
- 1856: Les Demoiselles du Ronçay
- 1860: Paris au jour le jour, with Hippolyte de Villemessant (2 volumes)
- 1862: Vichy-Sévigné, Vichy-Napoléon, ses eaux, ses embellissements, ses environs, son histoire, suivi d'une notice scientifique et médicale sur les eaux minérales de Vichy par le Dr Casimir Daumas
- 1868: Misères d'un prix de Rome
- 1872: Un dîner chez Brébant
- 1872: La Semaine des quatre jeudis
- 1877: À la recherche d'un gendre
- 1879: Le Roman de deux bourgeois
- 1886: Le Tiroir aux souvenirs

Theatre

- 1836: Trichemont fils, vaudeville in 1 act, with Marc Michel, Théâtre d'Angoulême, 29 September
- 1839: Un dragon de vertu, folie-vaudeville in 1 act, with Marc Michel, Paris, Théâtre des Folies-Dramatiques, 27 July
- 1839: Un neveu, s'il vous plaît, folie-vaudeville in 1 act, with Émile Pagès, Paris, Théâtre de l'Ambigu-Comique, 14 October
- 1842: La Peur du mal, comedy in 1 act, mixed with distincts, with Armand-Numa Jautard, Paris, Théâtre de l'Ambigu-Comique, 31 March
- 1842: Le Droit d'aînesse, comédie en vaudevilles in 2 acts, with Louis Lurine, Paris, Théâtre des Délassements-Comiques, 13 August
- 1854: La Comédie à Ferney, comedy in 1 act and in prose, with Louis Lurine, Paris, Théâtre-Français, 15 July
- 1855: English spoken, vaudeville in 1 act, with Auguste Joltrois, Paris, Théâtre du Palais-Royal, 7 July
- 1869: Une vendetta parisienne, comedy in 1 act, in prose, Paris, Théâtre du Vaudeville, 11 February
- 1869: La Fontaine de Berny, opéra comique en 1 acte, music by Adolphe Nibelle, Paris, Théâtre de l'Opéra-Comique, 2 June
- 1872: Un maître en service, comedy in 1 act, with Jules Blerzy, Paris, Théâtre du Gymnase, 8 September
- 1875: Un mouton à l'entresol, comedy in 1 act, with Eugène Labiche, Paris, Théâtre du Palais-Royal, 30 April
- 1878: Un baiser anonyme, comedy in 1 act and in prose, with Jules Blerzy, Comédie-Française
- 1882: La Vicomtesse Alice, drama in 5 acts and 8 tableaux, with Léon Beauvallet, Paris, Théâtre des Nations, 28 September
- 1883: La Vie facile, comedy in 3 acts, with Paul Ferrier, Paris, Théâtre du Vaudeville, 19 May
- 1885: Coup de soleil, comedy in 1 act, with Théodore de Grave, Paris, Théâtre de l'Odéon, 28 October

== Sources ==
- Camille Dreyfus, La Grande Encyclopédie, inventaire raisonné des sciences, des lettres et des arts, 1885-1902, vol. XXIX, p. 859.
- Pierre Larousse, Grand Dictionnaire universel du XIXe siècle, vol. XIV, 1875, p. 451-452.
