= Henry Lyonnet =

French writer (1853–1933)

Henry Lyonnet, real name Alfred Copin, (1853 - 4 February 1933) was a French writer. He is mostly known for his studies on the history of theatre, and specifically for his Dictionnaire des comédiens français.

== Main works ==
under the name Alfred Copin :

- Histoire des comédiens de la troupe de Molière, Paris, L. Frinzine, 1886.
- Études dramatiques. Talma et la Révolution, Paris, L. Frinzine, 1887.
- Études dramatiques. Talma et l'Empire, Paris, L. Fruizine, 1887.
- Les Maisons historiques de Paris, Paris, A. Dupret, 1888.

Under the pseudonym Henry Lyonnet :

- À travers l'Espagne inconnue, Barcelone, Richardin, R. Lamm et Cie, 1896.
- Le Théâtre hors de France. 1 série : Le Théâtre en Espagne, Paris, P. Ollendorff, 1897.
- Le Théâtre hors de France. 2 série : Le Théâtre au Portugal, Paris, P. Ollendorff, 1898.
- Le Théâtre hors de France. 3 série : Le Théâtre en Italie, Paris, P. Ollendorff, 1900.
- Le Théâtre hors de France. 4 série : Pulcinella et compagnie, le théâtre napolitain, Paris, P. Ollendorff, 1901.
- Dictionnaire des comédiens français (ceux d'hier). Biographie, bibliographie, iconographie, Genève, Bibliothèque de la Revue universelle internationale illustrée, 1902-1908, 2 vol.
  - Other edition : Paris, Librairie de l'art du théâtre, (1904), 2 vol.
  - Reimpression : Genève, Slatkine, 1969, 2 tomes en 1 vol.
- La Mort de Jocrisse, comedy in 1 act, Paris, Librairie Molière, 1904.
- Le Premier de l'An d'un cabot, véridique aventure en 1 acte, s.l., 1909.
- Les "Premières" de Molière, Paris, Delagrave, 1921.
- Les "Premières" de P. Corneille, Paris, Delagrave, 1923.
- Les "Premières" de Jean Racine, Paris, Delagrave, 1924.
- Les "Premières" d'Alfred de Musset, Paris, Delagrave, 1927.
- "Le Cid" de Corneille, Paris, E. Malfère, 1929.
- Cervantès, Nancy-Paris-Strasbourg, Berger-Levrault, 1930.
- Les Comédiennes, Paris, M. Seheur, 1930.
- "La Dame aux camélias" d'Alexandre Dumas, Paris, Société française d'éditions littéraires et techniques, 1930.
- Les "Premières" de Victor Hugo, Paris, Delagrave, 1930.
