= The Voyage of Mr. Perrichon =

Play by Eugène Marin Labiche and Édouard Martin

- Original language: French
- Written by: Eugène Marin Labiche and Édouard Martin

Premiere
- Date: September 10, 1860

Le Voyage de Monsieur Perrichon (French pronunciation: [lə vwajaʒ də məsjø peʁiʃɔ̃]) – variously translated from French as The Voyage of Mr. Perrichon, Mr. Perrichon's Journey, or Mr. Perrichon's Holiday – is a comic play in four acts, written by Eugène Marin Labiche and Édouard Martin. It satirizes the bourgeoisie during the Second Empire of France, the country's relatively new railway system, and France's annexation of Nice and Savoie, both in 1860.

It follows the exploits of Mr. Perrichon, a wealthy coachbuilder, who embarks on a family vacation to the Swiss Alps. Their trip is joined by two suitors, who challenge each other to win a marriage with Perrichon's daughter Henrietta. A series of falls into glacial ravines occur, including a rescue that leads to fame and esteem for Perrichon. Meanwhile, Perrichon incurs the ire of the town's lovelorn mayor, and their conflict soon escalates into a ridiculous duel.

The play was a "triumphant success" and led to Labiche being crowned "king of vaudeville."

== History ==
The play premiered on September 10, 1860 at the Théâtre du Gymnase in Paris. It ran nightly until the 15th and received favorable reviews. Renowned French actor Jean-Marie Geoffroy played the part of Monsieur Perrichon.

== Legacy and adaptations ==
It was added to the Comédie-Française repertory in 1906.

In 1934, Jean Tarride directed a film adaptation.

In 1978, Hans Bergström directed a Swedish movie based on the play titled Fantastiska pappa.

In 1982, a second French adaptation was released, directed by Pierre Badel.

In 1986, Russian director Margarita Michaelen directed a comedy movie musical based on the play. It is set in late-Victorian era France and features actors including Oleg Tabakov, Tatyana Vasilyeva, Valentin Gaft, Marina Zudina, Igor Sklyar, Aleksandr Filippenko, and Yekaterina Vasilyeva. The music was composed by David Tukhmanov in various Russian pop and Broadway styles, culminating in multiple dramatic musical numbers.

In 2014 a French telefilm adaptation was released.
