= Louis Lurine =

French homme de lettres, playwright, and historian (1812–1860)

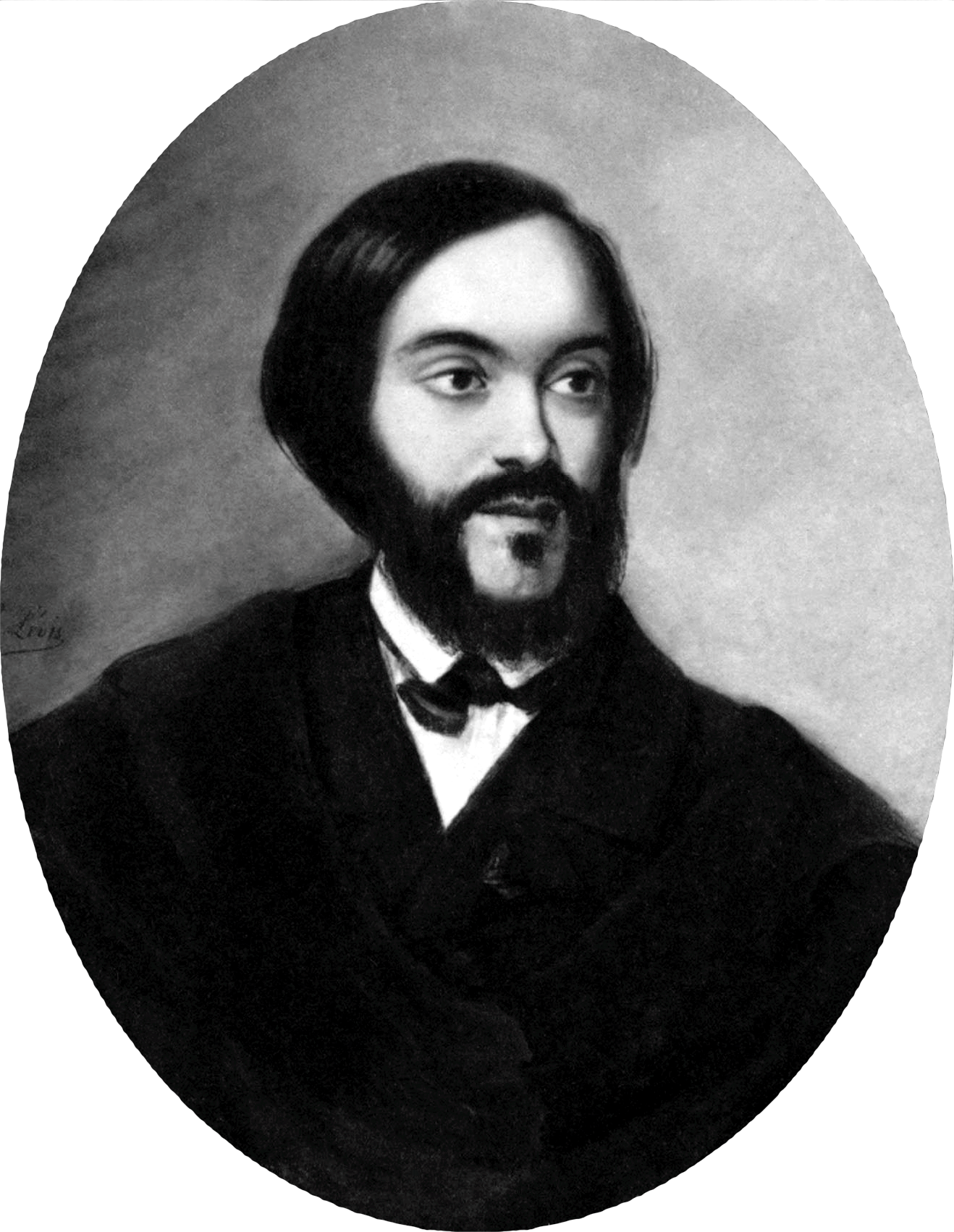
- Louis Lurine
- Born: 1812; Burgos, Spain
- Died: 30 November 1860 (aged 47–48); 9th arrondissement of Paris, France
- Occupations: Playwright, historian, journalist

Louis Lurine (1812 – 30 November 1860) was a 19th-century French homme de lettres, journalist, playwright, novelist and historian.

== Biography ==
Born in Spain from French parents, he was raised in Paris and Bordeaux. He started writing at an early age, collaborated to some vaudevilles and was attached to several newspapers in the provinces. He trained Félix Solar when he was a beginner.

Back to Paris in 1840, he contributed feuilletons and short stories to the Courrier français, Le National and Le Siècle. For several years, he worked to books dedicated to the history of Paris while continuing his theatrical career. He became editor of the political journal La Séance in 1848 and of the theatrical magazine La Comédie in 1853. He also was president of the Société des gens de lettres.

He was managing director of the Théâtre du Vaudeville from 1858 until his death.

== Main publications ==
- Le Cauchemar politique, satirical pamphlet (1831)
- Physiologie du vin de Champagne, par deux buveurs d’eau, with Bouvier (1841)
- Les Rues de Paris. Paris ancien et moderne, 1844 : origines, histoire, monuments, costumes, mœurs, chroniques et traditions, illustrated with 300 drawings by Grandville, Daumier, etc. (2 volumes, 1844) Text online 1 Illustrations online
- Histoire de Napoléon, racontée aux enfants petits et grands (1844)
- Les Environs de Paris, paysage, histoire, monuments, mœurs, chroniques et traditions, under the direction of Charles Nodier and Louis Lurine, illustrated with 200 drawings (1844) Text online
- Les Prisons de Paris, histoire, types, mœurs, mystères, with Maurice Alhoy (1846) Text online
- La Vierge du travail (1846)
- Les Couvents, with Alphonse Brot, illustrated by Henri Baron, Tony Johannot, François-Louis Français and Célestin Nanteuil (1846)
- Histoire poétique et politique de M. de Lamartine (1844)
- Histoire secrète et publique de la police ancienne et moderne (3 volumes, 1847)
- Le Treizième Arrondissement de Paris, novel (1850)
- Le Train de Bordeaux, voyage dans le passé, short stories (1854)
- Ici l’on aime. Le Cœur de Mignon. Le Secret des aumônes. L’Âme du violon. Le Chasseur d’ombres. La Véritable Mort de Vatel. Le Mouchoir de Bérénice. Pierrot. La Guerre des Dieux. L’Avocat. L’Oreiller. Le Cœur et l’esprit. Le Club des mendiants. Le Prédicateur. Le Paratonnerre. Héro et Léandre, short stories (1854)
- Le Mannequin russe, pamphlet (1854)
- Le Palais-royal (1855)
- Éloge de Balzac (1856)
- Voyage dans le passé (1860)

Theatre

- 1832 : Le Duc de Reischtadt, drama in 2 acts mingled with couplets, with Jacques Arago Text online
- 1832 : Chabert, histoire contemporaine in 2 acts, mingled with song, with Jacques Arago, Théâtre du Vaudeville (2 July) Text online
- 1833 : Richelieu à quatre-vingts ans, comedy in 1 act, mingled with song, with Jacques-François Ancelot, Théâtre du Vaudeville (16 October)
- 1833 : La Peur du mal, comedy in 1 act, mingled with song, with Jacques-François Ancelot, Théâtre du Vaudeville (25 November)
- 1834 : Madame Basile, comedy in 1 act, with Félix Solar, Théâtre du Vaudeville (17 June)
- 1841 : Caliste, ou le Geôlier, comédie-vaudeville in 1 act, with Narcisse Fournier, Théâtre du Gymnase-Dramatique (30 October)
- 1842 : Le Droit d’aînesse, comédie-vaudeville in 2 acts, with Albéric Second, Théâtre des Délassements-Comiques (13 August)
- 1854 : La Comédie à Ferney, comedy in 1 act and in prose, with Albéric Second, Théâtre-Français (15 July)
- 1854 : Le Vieux Bodin, comédie-vaudeville in 1 act, Théâtre du Vaudeville (14 October)
- 1856 : Madame Bijou, comédie-vaudeville in 1 act, with Raymond Deslandes, Théâtre des Variétés (24 January)
- 1856 : L’Amant aux bouquets, comedy in 1 act, with Raymond Deslandes, Théâtre du Palais-Royal (1 March) Text online
- 1856 : Les Femmes peintes par elles-mêmes, comedy in 1 act, with Raymond Deslandes, Théâtre du Vaudeville (30 May)
- 1856 : Le Camp des révoltées, fantaisie in 1 act, with Raymond Deslandes, Théâtre des Variétés (17 July)
- 1857 : Les Comédiennes, comedy in 4 acts, with Raymond Deslandes, Théâtre du Gymnase (9 May)
- 1858 : La Boîte d’argent, comedy in 1 act, with Raymond Deslandes, after a short story by Alexandre Dumas fils, Théâtre du Gymnase-Dramatique (12 April) Text online
- 1859 : Monsieur Jules, ou le Père terrible, comedy in 2 acts, mingled with song, with Raymond Deslandes, Théâtre des Variétés (31 October)

== Honours ==
- Chevalier de la Légion d'honneur (25 April 1847 decree)

== Sources ==
- Pierre Larousse, Grand Dictionnaire universel du XIXe, vol. X, 1873, p. 794, and Gustave Vapereau, Dictionnaire universel des contemporains, 1858, p. 1130.
