= Jean Tarride =

French actor and film director

Jean Tarride (1901–1980) was a French actor and film director. He was the brother of the actor Jacques Tarride.

== Selected filmography ==
Director

- L'Homme qui assassina (1931)
- Prisonnier de mon cœur (1932)
- The Yellow Dog (1932)
- Étienne (1933)
- The Voyage of Mr. Perrichon (1934)
- Skylark (1934)
- Tovaritch (1935)
- Death No Longer Awaits (1944)

== Bibliography ==
- Conway, Kelley. Chanteuse in the City: The Realist Singer in French Film. University of California Press, 2004.
- Oscherwitz, Dayna & Higgins, MaryEllen. The A to Z of French Cinema. Scarecrow Press, 2009.
