= Eugène Labiche =

French dramatist (1815–1888)

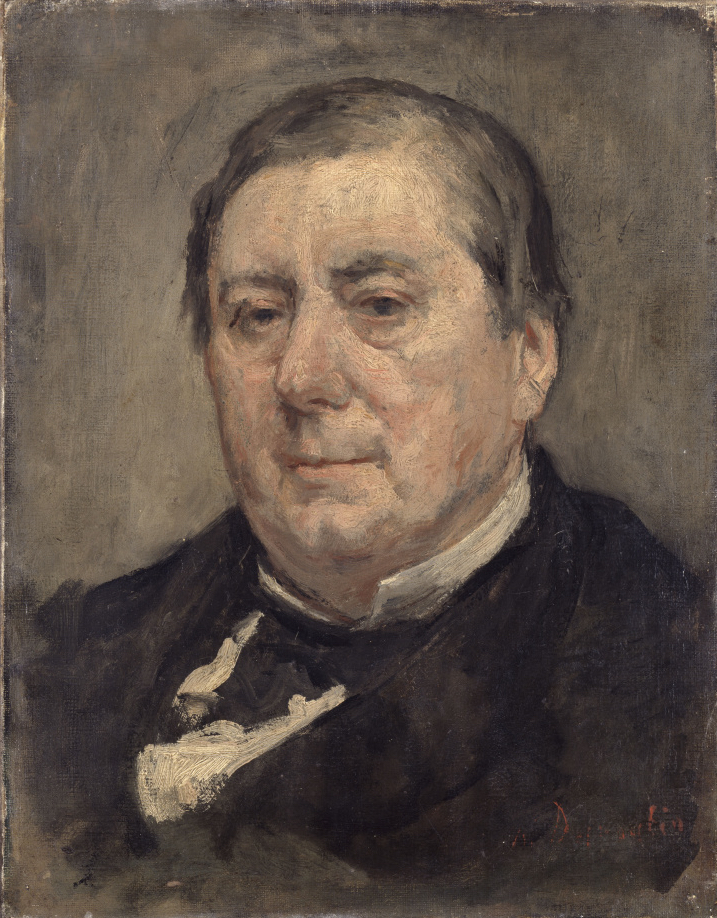
- Born: 6 May 1815; Paris, French Empire
- Died: 22 January 1888 (aged 72); Paris, France
- Resting place: Cimetière de Montmartre
- Writing career
- Genre: Dramaturgy
- Notable work: The Italian Straw Hat

Eugène Marin Labiche (French pronunciation: [øʒɛn maʁɛ̃ labiʃ]; 6 May 1815 – 22 January 1888) was a French dramatist. He remains famous for his contribution to the farce genre (known in France as vaudeville) and his passionate and domestic pochades.

In the 1860s, he reached his peak with a series of successes including Le Voyage de M. Perrichon (1860), La Poudre aux yeux (1861), La Station Champbaudet (1862) and La Cagnotte (1864). He worked with Jacques Offenbach, then director of the Bouffes-Parisiens, to write librettos for operettas and for several comic operas.

His 1851 farce The Italian Straw Hat, written with Marc-Michel, has been adapted many times to stage and screen.

== Early life ==
He was born into a bourgeois family and studied law. At the age of twenty, he contributed a short story to Chérubin magazine, entitled "Les plus belles sont les plus fausses" ("The most beautiful are the most fake/false"). A few others followed, but failed to catch the attention of the public.

== Career ==
Labiche tried his hand at dramatic criticism in the Revue des théâtres and in 1838, wrote and premiered two plays. The small Théâtre du Pantheon produced, to some popular success, his drama L'Avocat Loubet, while a vaudeville, Monsieur de Coyllin, ou l'homme infiniment poli (written in collaboration with Marc-Michel and performed at the Palais Royal) introduced a provincial actor who was to become and to remain a great Parisian favourite, the famous comedian Grassot.

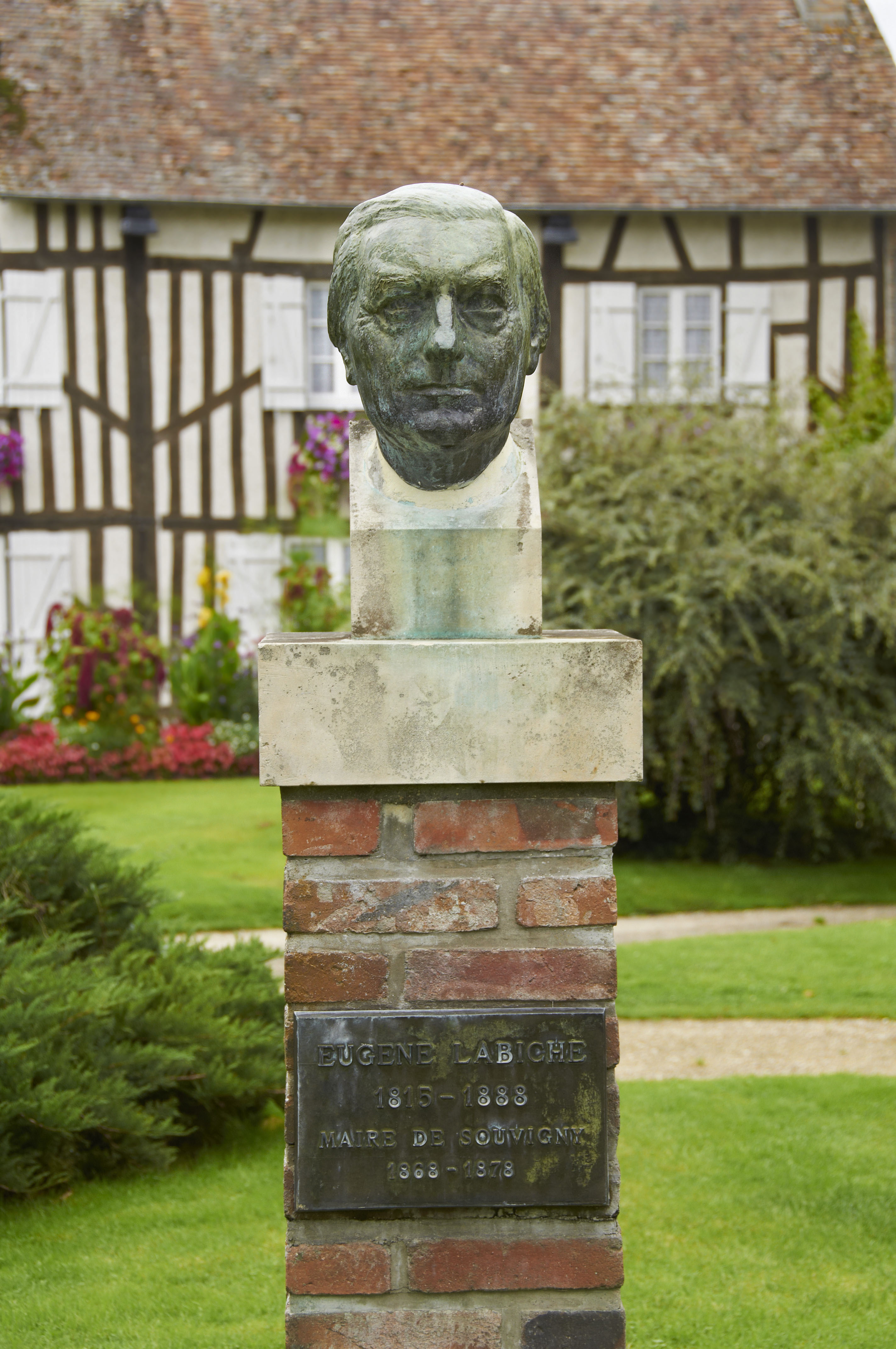
Statue in Souvigny-en-Sologne, France

In the same year, Labiche, still doubtful about his true vocation, published a romance called La Clé des champs. According to Léon Halévy, Labiche's publisher went bankrupt soon after the novel was out: "A lucky misadventure, for this timely warning of Destiny sent him back to the stage, where a career of success was awaiting him." There was yet another obstacle in the way. When he married, Labiche solemnly promised his wife's parents that he would renounce a profession then considered incompatible with moral regularity and domestic happiness. A year later, his wife released him from his vow, and Labiche recalled the incident when he dedicated the first edition of his complete works to her.

In conjunction with Charles Varin, Marc-Michel, Louis François Clairville, Philippe François Dumanoir, and others, he contributed comic plays interspersed with couplets to various Paris theatres. He was considered a successful but undistinguished vaudevillist, until he paired with Marc-Michel to create the five-act farce, Un Chapeau de paille d'Italie (The Italian Straw Hat), which turned out to be a major success upon its opening in August 1851. It is an accomplished specimen of the French imbroglio-style play, in which someone is in search of something, but does not find it till five minutes before the curtain falls. For the next twenty-five years, he continued to write successful comedies and vaudevilles, all basically constructed on the same plan and containing a dose of comic observation and good sense. "Of all the subjects," he said, "which offered themselves to me, I have selected the bourgeois. Essentially mediocre in his vices and in his virtues, he stands half-way between the hero and the scoundrel, between the saint and the profligate."

During the second period of his career Labiche collaborated with Alfred Delacour, Adolphe Choler, and others. Emile Augier said: "The distinctive qualities which secured a lasting vogue for the plays of Labiche are to be found in all the comedies written by him with different collaborators, and are conspicuously absent from those which they wrote without him." Even more important was his professional relationship with actor Jean Marie Geoffroy, who specialized in Labiche's pompous and fussy bourgeois characters. Many of Labiche's roles were written specifically for Geoffroy. Célimare le bien-aimé (1863), Le Voyage de M. Perrichon (1860), La Grammaire, Un Pied dans le crime, La Cagnotte (1864), were some of Labiche's most important plays.

== Retirement and death ==
In 1877, he ended his connection with the stage, and retired to his rural property in Sologne. There, he devoted his energies to supervising agricultural work and to reclaiming land and marshes. His lifelong friend, Émile Augier, visited him there, and strongly advised Labiche to publish a collected and revised edition of his works. Though Labiche was initially reluctant, he issued, during 1878 and 1879, his comic plays in ten volumes, which were enthusiastically received. Many people had assumed that Labiche's plays owed their popularity to the actors who had appeared in them, but, upon reading the plays, they realized that their success was due to the writing itself, with its humor and skilled characterization. Due to this re-evaluation of Labiche's writing, he was elected to the Académie française in 1880.

Labiche died in Paris and was buried in the Cimetière de Montmartre.

== Plays ==
- 1837: La Cuvette d’eau
- 1838: Monsieur de Coyllin ou l'Homme infiniment poli
- 1838: Le Capitaine d'Arcourt ou la Fée du château
- 1838: L'Avocat Loubet
- 1839: La Forge des châtaigniers
- 1839: La Peine du talion
- 1839: L'Article 960 ou la Donation
- 1840: Le Fin Mot
- 1840: Bocquet père et fils ou le Chemin le plus long
- 1840: Le Lierre et l'Ormeau
- 1842: Les Circonstances atténuantes
- 1843: L'Homme de paille
- 1844: Le Major Cravachon
- 1844: Deux papas très bien ou la Grammaire de Chicard
- 1845: Le Roi des Frontins
- 1845: L'École buissonnière
- 1845: L'Enfant de la maison
- 1846: Mademoiselle ma femme
- 1846: Rocambolle le bateleur
- 1846: Frisette
- 1846: L'Inventeur de la poudre
- 1847: L'Avocat pédicure
- 1847: La Chasse aux jobards
- 1847: Un homme sanguin
- 1847: L'Art de ne pas donner d'étrennes
- 1848: Un jeune homme pressé
- 1848: Le Club champenois
- 1848: Oscar XXVIII
- 1848: Le Baromètre
- 1848: Une chaîne anglaise
- 1848: À moitié chemin
- 1848: Histoire de rire
- 1848: Agénor le dangereux
- 1848: Une tragédie chez M. Grassot
- 1848: À bas la famille ou les Banquets
- 1849: Madame veuve Larifla
- 1849: Les Manchettes d'un vilain
- 1849: Un monsieur qui pose
- 1849: Une dent sous Louis XV
- 1849: Mon ours
- 1849: Trompe-la-balle
- 1849: Exposition des produits de la République
- 1849: Rue de l'Homme-Armé, numéro 8 bis
- 1849: Pour qui voterai-je?
- 1850: Embrassons-nous, Folleville!
- 1850: Traversin et Couverture
- 1850: Un garçon de chez Véry
- 1850: Le Sopha
- 1850: La Fille bien gardée
- 1850: Un bal en robe de chambre
- 1850: Les Petits Moyens
- 1850: Les Prétendus de Gimblette
- 1851: Une clarinette qui passe
- 1851: La Femme qui perd ses jarretières
- 1851: On demande des culottières
- 1851: Mam'zelle fait ses dents
- 1851: En manches de chemise
- 1851: Un chapeau de paille d'Italie (The Italian Straw Hat)
- 1852: Maman Sabouleux
- 1852: Un monsieur qui prend la mouche
- 1852: Soufflez-moi dans l'œil
- 1852: Les Suites d'un premier lit
- 1852: Le Misanthrope et l'Auvergnat
- 1852: Deux gouttes d'eau
- 1852: Piccolet
- 1852: Edgard et sa bonne
- 1852: Le Chevalier des dames
- 1852: Mon Isménie
- 1852: Une charge de cavalerie
- 1852: Un coup de rasoir
- 1853: Un ami acharné
- 1853: On dira des bêtises
- 1853: Un notaire à marier
- 1853: Un ut de poitrine
- 1853: La Chasse aux corbeaux
- 1853: Un feu de cheminée
- 1853: Le Pompadour des Percherons
- 1854: Deux profonds scélérats
- 1854: Un mari qui prend du ventre
- 1854: Espagnolas et Boyardinos
- 1854: Les Marquises de la Fourchette
- 1854: Ôtez votre fille, s'il vous plaît
- 1855: La Perle de la Canebière
- 1855: Monsieur votre fille
- 1855: Les Précieux
- 1856: Les Cheveux de ma femme
- 1856: En pension chez son groom
- 1856: Monsieur de Saint-Cadenas
- 1856: La Fiancée du bon coin
- 1856: Si jamais je te pince!...
- 1856: Mesdames de Montenfriche
- 1856: Un monsieur qui a brûlé une dame
- 1857: Le Bras d'Ernest
- 1857: L'Affaire de la rue de Lourcine
- 1857: La Dame aux jambes d'azur
- 1857: Les Noces de Bouchencœur
- 1857: Le Secrétaire de Madame
- 1857: Un gendre en surveillance
- 1858: Je croque ma tante
- 1858: Le Clou aux maris
- 1858: L'Avare en gants jaunes
- 1858: Deux merles blancs
- 1858: Madame est aux eaux
- 1858: Le Grain de café
- 1858: Le Calife de la rue Saint-Bon
- 1858: En avant les Chinois!
- 1859: L'Avocat d'un Grec
- 1859: L'Amour, un fort volume, prix 3 F 50 c
- 1859: L'École des Arthur
- 1859: L'Omelette à la Follembuche
- 1859: Le Baron de Fourchevif
- 1859: Les Petites Mains
- 1859: Voyage autour de ma marmite
- 1859: Le Rouge-Gorge
- 1860: J'Invite le Colonel!
- 1860: La Sensitive
- 1860: Les Deux Timides
- 1860: Le Voyage de monsieur Perrichon (The Voyage of Mr. Perrichon)
- 1860: La Famille de l'horloger
- 1860: Un Gros Mot
- 1861: J'ai Compromis ma femme
- 1861: Les Vivacités du Capitaine Tic
- 1861: L'Amour en sabots
- 1861: Le Mystère de la rue Rousselet
- 1861: La Poudre aux yeux
- 1862: Les Petits Oiseaux
- 1862: La Station Champbaudet
- 1862: Les 37 Sous de Monsieur Montaudoiun
- 1862: Le première pas
- 1863: La Dame au petit chien
- 1863: Permettez, Madame!...
- 1863: La Commode de Victorine
- 1863: Célimar: Le Bien-Aimé
- 1864: La Cagnotte
- 1864: Moi
- 1864: Un Mari qui lance sa femme
- 1864: Le Point de Mire
- 1865: Premier Prix de piano
- 1865: L'Homme qui manque le coche
- 1865: La Bergère de la rue Monthabor
- 1865: Le Voyage en Chine
- 1866: Un Pied Dans le Crime
- 1867: Le Fils du brigadier
- 1867: La Grammaire
- 1867: La Main Leste
- 1867: Les Chemins de fer
- 1868: Le Papa du prix d'honneur
- 1868: Le Corricolo
- 1868: Le Roi d’Amatibou
- 1868: Le Petit Voyage
- 1869: Le Dossier de Rosafol
- 1869: Le Choix d'un Gendre (un pochade en un acte)
- 1870: Le Plus Heureux des Trois
- 1870: Le Cachemire X. B. T.
- 1871: Le Livre bleu
- 1871: L'Ennemie
- 1872: Il est de la police
- 1872: La Mémoire d'Hortense
- 1872: Doit-on le dire?
- 1873: 29 Degrés à l'Ombre
- 1874: Garanti dix ans
- 1874: Brûlons Voltaire!
- 1874: Madame est trop belle
- 1874: La Pièce de Chambertin
- 1874: Les Samedis de Madame
- 1875: Les Trente Millions de Gladiator
- 1875: Un mouton à l'entresol
- 1875: La Guigne
- 1876: Le Prix Martin
- 1876: Le roi dort
- 1876: La Cigale chez les fourmis
- 1877: L'Amour de l'art
- 1877: Un coup de rasoir
- 1877: La Clé

== Filmography ==
- L'Affaire de la rue de Lourcine, directed by Henri Diamant-Berger (France, 1923, based on the play L'Affaire de la rue de Lourcine), which starred Maurice Chevalier.
- La Fille bien gardée, directed by Louis Feuillade (France, 1924, based on the play La Fille bien gardée)
- The Italian Straw Hat, directed by René Clair (France, 1928, based on the play The Italian Straw Hat)
- Two Timid Souls, directed by René Clair (France, 1928, based on the play Les Deux Timides)
- L'Affaire de la rue de Lourcine, directed by Marcel Dumont (France, 1932, short film, based on the play L'Affaire de la rue de Lourcine)
- Le Voyage de monsieur Perrichon, directed by Jean Tarride (France, 1934, based on the play Le Voyage de monsieur Perrichon)
- The Leghorn Hat, directed by Wolfgang Liebeneiner (Germany, 1939, based on the play The Italian Straw Hat)
- My Aunt the Dictator, directed by René Pujol (France, 1939, based on the play Maman Sabouleux)
- Un chapeau de paille d'Italie, directed by Maurice Cammage (France, 1941, based on the play The Italian Straw Hat)
- Two Timid Souls, directed by Yves Allégret (France, 1943, based on the play Les Deux Timides)
- Il viaggio del signor Perrichon, directed by Paolo Moffa (Italy, 1943, based on the play Le Voyage de monsieur Perrichon)
- Die tolle Susanne, directed by Géza von Bolváry (Germany, 1945, based on the play Les Trente Millions de Gladiator), unfinished film
- My Niece Susanne, directed by Wolfgang Liebeneiner (West Germany, 1950, based on the play Les Trente Millions de Gladiator)
- Three Days of Fun in Paris, directed by Émile Couzinet (France, 1954, based on the play La Cagnotte)
- Matrimonios juveniles, directed by José Díaz Morales (Mexico, 1961, based on the play The Italian Straw Hat)
- Straw Hat, directed by Oldřich Lipský (Czechoslovakia, 1971, based on the play The Italian Straw Hat)
- The Straw Hat, directed by Leonid Kvinikhidze (The Soviet Union, 1974, based on the play The Italian Straw Hat)
- Doit-on le dire ?, directed by Jean-Laurent Cochet (France, 1980, based on the play Doit-on le dire ?, live recording of a performance at the Comédie Française)
- The Voyage of Monsieur Perrichon / Путешествие мсье Перришона, directed by Margarita Mikaelyan / Маргари́та Микаэля́н (The Soviet Union, 1986, based on the play Le Voyage de monsieur Perrichon)
