= Marc-Michel =

French playwright, poet, and journalist (1812–1868)

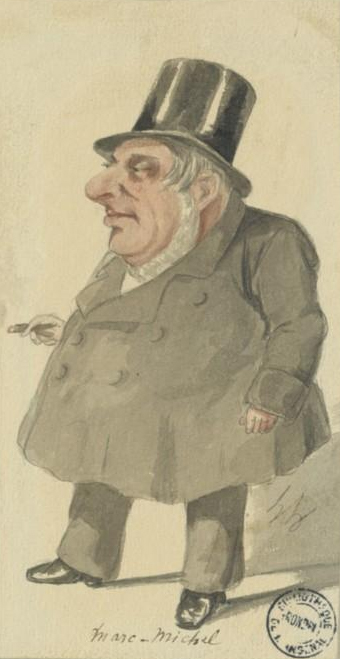
- Portrait of Marc-Michel by Lhéritier.
- Born: Marc-Antoine-Amédée Michel; 22 July 1812; Marseille, French Empire
- Died: 12 March 1868 (aged 55); Paris, French Empire
- Occupations: Poet, playwright, journalist

Marc-Antoine-Amédée Michel, known as Marc-Michel (22 July 1812 in Marseille – 12 March 1868 in Paris) was a French poet, playwright and journalist. He is perhaps best known today for the 1851 farce he co-wrote with Eugène Marin Labiche, The Italian Straw Hat, since then adapted many times to stage and screen.

== Life ==
He began his studies in Aix-en-Provence in 1821 at the collège Saint-Louis, run by the Jesuits.
