= Théâtre des Nouveautés =

Theatre in Paris, France

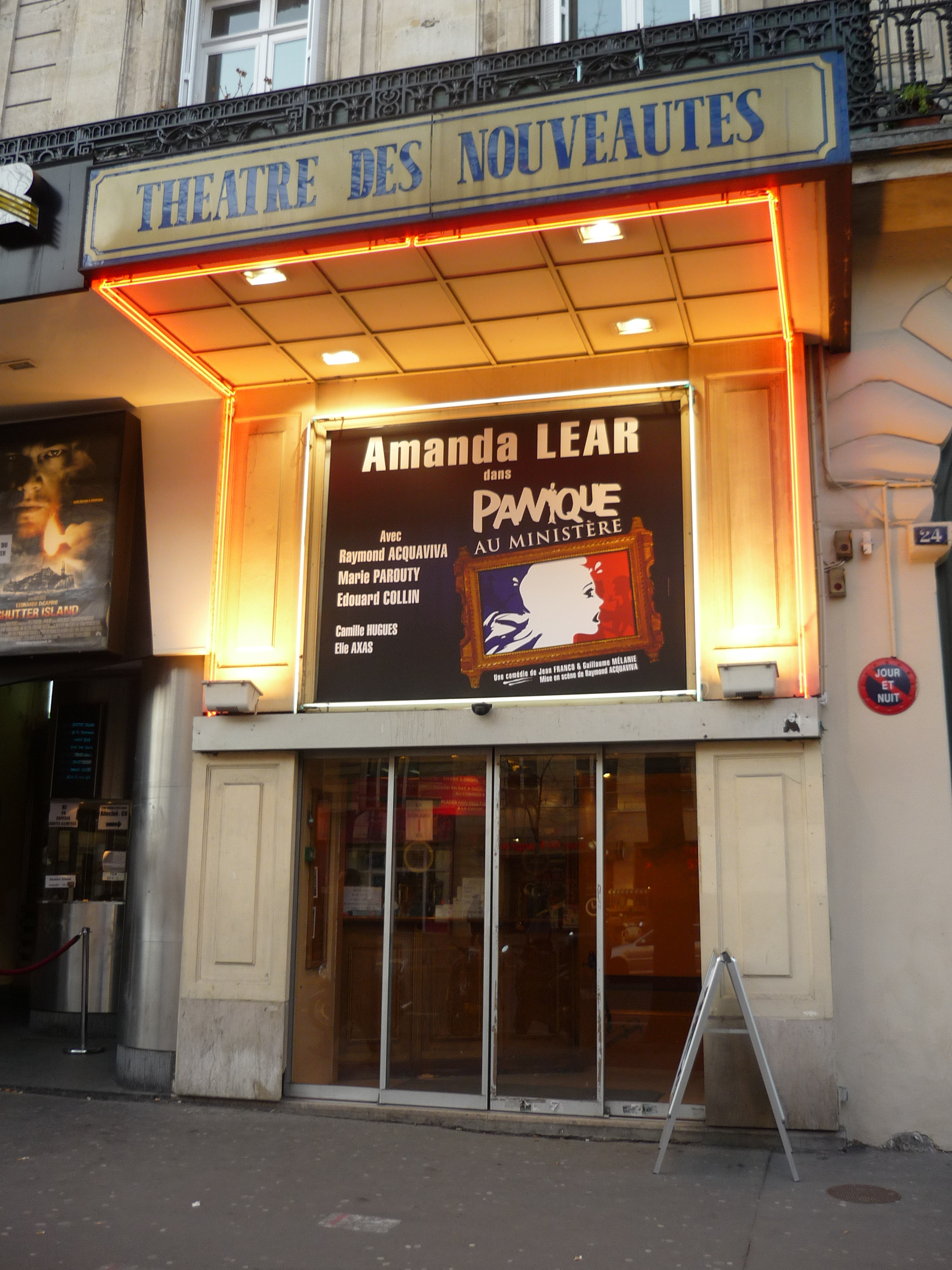
- Théâtre des Nouveautés in 2010
- Interactive map of the Théâtre des Nouveautés area

General information
- Location: 24 boulevard Poissonnière, Paris 9th arr., France
- Coordinates: 48.8713°N 2.3448°E
- Inaugurated: 1921

Other information
- Seating capacity: 585

Website
- www.theatredesnouveautes.fr

The Théâtre des Nouveautés ("Theatre of the New") is a Parisian theatre built in 1921 and located at 24 boulevard Poissonnière (Paris, 9th arr.). The name was also used by several earlier Parisian theatre companies and their buildings, beginning in 1827.

== Present theatre (boulevard Poissonnière) ==
The current Théâtre des Nouveautés was established in 1921 at 24 boulevard Poissonnière, (Paris, 9th arr.) under the leadership of Benoît-Léon Deutsch in collaboration with Gilbert Dupé. Built by the architect Adolf Tiers with 585 seats, the hall was inaugurated on 21 April 1921 with the play La journée des surprises ("The Day of Surprises") by Jean Bouchor. The programming was devoted to operettas and comedies. Gilbert Dupé succeeded Benoît-Léon Deutsch from 1961 to 1973. Denise Moreau-Chantegris took over in September 1973, and in 2010 Pascal Legros became the director of the theatre.

=== Recent productions ===
- 2009: Un oreiller … ou trois? ("One pillow … or three?") by Ray Cooney and Gene Stone, originally Why not stay for breakfast? adapted and translated by Stewart Vaughan and Jean-Claude Islert, starring Delphine Depardieu and Paul Belmondo
- 2010: Panique au ministère ("Panic at the Ministry") by Jean Franco and Guillaume Mélanie starring Amanda Lear
- 2011: Le gai mariage ("The Gay Marriage") by Gérard Bitton and Michel Munz

== Earlier theatre companies using the name ==
The name was used for three different companies prior to inauguration of the current company in 1921.

=== 1827–1832 (Salle de la Bourse) ===
The first Théâtre des Nouveautés opened on 10 March 1827 in the Salle de la Bourse (capacity 1250) located on the rue Vivienne, (Paris 2nd arr.) across from the Paris Bourse. The founder was Cyprien Bérard, a former director of the Théâtre du Vaudeville. The programs consisted of ballads, opéras comiques (Hector Berlioz was a chorister there for a few months), satires and political plays. The theatre suffered the prohibitions of censorship and had recurrent difficulties with the Opéra-Comique, which refused to share its privileges. However, for other reasons Bérard was forced to close his theatre on 15 February 1832. The Salle de la Bourse was later used by the Opéra-Comique, then the Théâtre du Vaudeville until 1869, when that company moved into a new theatre on the Boulevard des Capucines. The Salle de la Bourse was closed and immediately demolished.

=== 1866–1873 (rue du Faubourg-Saint-Martin) ===
After more than thirty years of eclipse, a second Théâtre des Nouveautés was inaugurated on 7 April 1866 in a theatre on the rue du Faubourg-Saint-Martin (Paris 10th arr.), replacing the Salle Raphael, which had been built in 1863 and temporarily housed the troupe of the Théâtre des Délassements-Comiques in 1864. But a fire completely destroyed the new theatre just eight months after its opening. Rebuilt in less than three months, the theatre reopened on 28 January 1867. Many productions followed until October 1873 when the theatre returned to its former name - Théâtre des Délassements-Comiques. This incarnation of the theatre was demolished in 1878.

=== 1878–1911 (boulevard des Italiens) ===
On 12 June 1878 a new Théâtre des Nouveautés was inaugurated at 26 boulevard des Italiens (Paris, 2nd arr.). Founded by Jules Brasseur (who had been an actor for over twenty years at the Théâtre du Palais-Royal) in collaboration with Mme Michaux (director of the Royal Park Theatre in Brussels), the new theatre was built on the site of the old Fantaisies-Parisiennes, which had been inaugurated in 1864 and in 1875 completely rebuilt in a more convenient and carefully redecorated fashion as the Folies-Ollier. This incarnation of the Théâtre des Nouveautés was demolished in 1911 to allow the construction of the rue des Italiens.

== Bibliography ==
- Hemmings, F. W. J. (1994). Theatre and State in France, 1760–1905. New York: Cambridge University Press. ISBN 978-0-521-03472-2 (2006 reprint).
- Sadie, Stanley, ed. (1992). The New Grove Dictionary of Opera (4 volumes). London: Macmillan. ISBN 978-1-56159-228-9.
