= Imad =

Emad
- Pronunciation: Arabic: [ʕɪˈmaːd, ʕeˈmæːd] (among others); Persian: [ʔeˈmɒːd]
- Gender: Male
- Language: Arabic

Origin
- Meaning: 'Support', 'Pillar'
- Region of origin: Arabia

Other names
- Alternative spelling: Imaad, Emad, Emaad, Imed, Aimad

Emad (also transliterated as Imad, Imed and Aimad; Arabic: عماد) is an Arabic masculine given name and surname and means "support" or "pillar". What they trust. This name conjures up images of trust, strength, and stability.

== Given name ==
- Imād ad-Dīn Muhammad bin Qasim (695–715), Umayyad Caliphate general
- Imad Abbas (1975–2004), Palestinian military commander
- Imad Abullah Sarah (born 1968), Syrian politician
- Imad Baba (born 1974), American soccer player
- Imad Feghaly, Lebanese actor and voice actor
- Emad Hajjaj (born 1967), Jordanian political cartoonist
- Imad Hawari (born 1979), Lebanese journalist, actor
- Emad al-Janabi (born 1965), Iraqi blacksmith
- Imad Khalili (born 1987), Swedish footballer
- Imad Khamis (born 1961), Syrian politician
- Imad Kotbi (born 1978), Moroccan radio presenter
- Imad Mohammad Alatiqi (1956–2025), Kuwaiti oil scientist and politician
- Emad Mohammed (born 1982), Iraqi footballer
- Emad Mostaque (born 1983), founder of Stability AI
- Imad Rahman, Pakistani American fiction writer
- Imad Rami (born 1963), Syrian Nasheed singer
- Imad Wasim (born 1988), Pakistani international cricketer

=== Imed ===
- Imed Abdelnabbi (born 1957), Egyptian chess player
- Imed Louati (born 1993), Tunisian footballer
- Imed Memmich (born 1966), Tunisian scholar and politician
- Imed Meniaoui (born 1983), Tunisian footballer
- Imed Mhedhebi (born 1976), Tunisian footballer
- Imed Trabelsi (born 1974), Tunisian businessman and politician
- Imed Ben Younes (born 1974), Tunisian former football player and current coach

== Surname ==
- Mitra Emad, American anthropologist
- Parvis Emad (1935–2023), American philosopher and professor emeritus of Philosophy at DePaul University

== Family origin ==
The Imad family is named for al-Amadiyyah, near Mosul in northern Iraq and, like the Jumblatt family, is thought to be of Kurdish origin.

Some unconfirmed sources allege that the roots of Family Imad ancestors are associated with those of Imad ad-Din Zengi (1087; † 1146), who was in turn the Atabeg of Mosul from 1127 to his death in 1146.

Imad as a family name also indicates descent from the originally Druze feudal family Al-Imad in the Chouf region of Mount Lebanon.
