= François Dominique Séraphin =

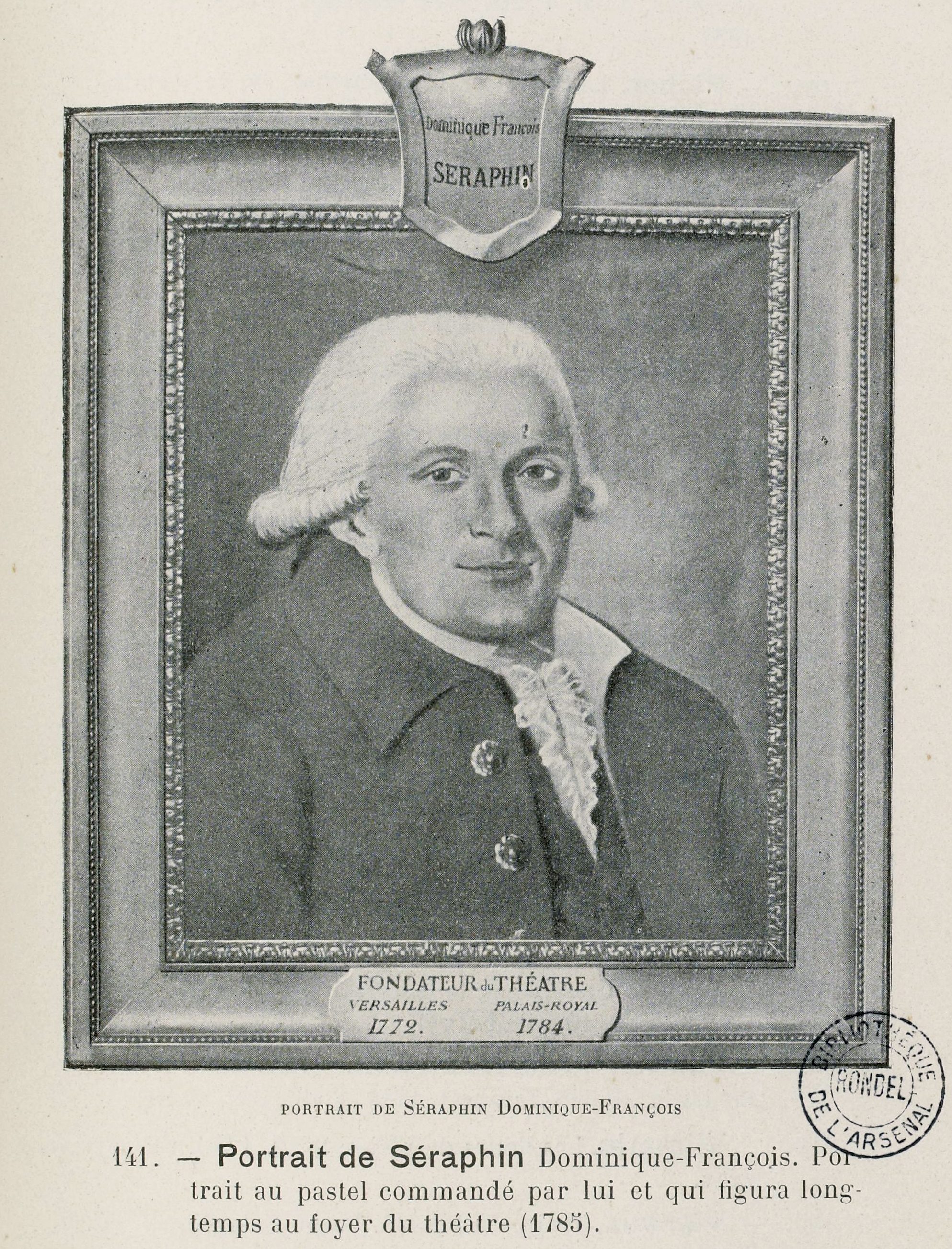
Portrait of Séraphin.jpg

François Dominique Séraphin (15 February 1747 – 5 December 1800) was a French entertainer who developed and popularised shadow plays in France. The art form would go on to be copied across Europe.

== Shadow plays ==
Séraphin was born in Longwy, near Luxembourg. The art of using shadows to form figures onto a screen can be traced back to 9th-century Indonesia and China. European travellers saw these "Ombres Chinoises" (Chinese shadows) and returned home with descriptions of their performance. Séraphin introduced his version of the act at the back of a Versailles inn during the early 1770s. Though he started the show in humble beginnings they became such a success, including regular visits from the aristocracy, that Séraphin would go on to perform at the Palace of Versailles in front of royalty.

In 1784 Séraphin moved to Paris, performing his shows at the newly opened Palais-Royal from 8 September 1784. During this time Marie Antoinette visited three of his plays. The performances would continue through the French Revolution. Séraphin died in 1800 but his shows continued initially under the direction of his nephew until the theatre closed in 1870.

Séraphin had adapted the Ombres Chinoises and devised new methods to control the shadow-throwing puppets. Rather than use hidden performers moving the parts of the silhouetted puppets, Séraphin developed the use of clockwork mechanisms to automate the show. He made a variety of devices and performed several different acts including "Le Chasse aux canards" (The Duck Hunt), "Le Magicien Rothomago" (Rothomago the Magician), and "L'Embarras du ménage" (The Embarrassment of the Household). Amongst Séraphin's most popular works was Le Pont Cassé (The Broken Bridge), a play based on a musical piece by Louis-Gabriel Guillemain. At the height of popularity the most famous of Séraphin's shadow plays were reproduced so that children could perform them. Script details and paper versions of the characters were made in Épinal, Nancy, and Augsburg. Children would stick the characters to cardboard and cut them out, performing their own versions of the stories in small toy theatres.

Séraphin is seen as the most important figure in the development of the art form. His work is believed to have been seen by Philip James de Loutherbourg, giving him inspiration for his mechanical work including the Eidophusikon. Techniques used to create the shadow plays were also replicated and combined with other emerging technologies, including magic lanterns, to form phantasmagoria shows.

He died in Paris.

== Bibliography ==
- Edmond-Denis De Manne, Charles Ménétrier : Galerie historique des comédiens de la troupe de Nicolet: notices sur certains acteurs et mimes qui se sont fait un nom dans les annales des scènes secondaires depuis 1760 jusqu'à nos jours N. Scheuring, 1869 -
