= Doody =

Doody, a variant of O'Dowd (Ó Dubhda), is a surname of Irish heritage. It originated in the Kingdom of Uí Fiachrach Muaidhe as the name of the ruling dynasty. It may refer to:

== People ==
- Alison Doody (born 1966), Irish actress and model
- C. William Doody (1931–2005), Canadian politician
- Edward Doody (1903−1968), Australian Roman Catholic bishop
- Jonathan Doody (born 1974), Thai mass murderer in 1991 Arizona shooting
- Margaret Doody (born 1939), Canadian writer of historical detective fiction, feminist literary critic and professor of literature
- Martha M. Vertreace-Doody (born 1945), American poet and author
- Michael Doody, Canadian politician
- Nick Doody (born 1972), British stand-up comedian
- Pat Doody (1938–1990), British broadcaster
- Patrick Doody (born 1992), American retired soccer player
- Patrick H. Doody (1840–1924), Irish soldier in the American Civil War awarded the Medal of Honor
- Rachel Doody (born 1984), New Zealand retired footballer
- Samuel Doody (1656–1706), English botanist
- Terrence Doody (born 1943), American literary scholar

== Fictional characters ==
- the title puppet character of Howdy Doody, an American children's TV series
- Doody Cubee, the orange female Cubee from the British children’s show, Cubeez
- Doody, a character in the 1978 film Grease (film)
