= David Syring =

American anthropologist

David Michael Syring
- Education: Rice University (PhD 1997)
- Spouse: Mitra Emad
- Scientific career
- Fields: anthropology
- Institutions: University of Minnesota Duluth, University of San Diego
- Thesis: Places in the world a person could walk: Auto-ethnobiographical explorations of family, stories, home and place (1997)
- Doctoral advisor: George E. Marcus
- Other academic advisors: Stephen A. Tyler, Terrence Doody

David Michael Syring is an American anthropologist and Department Head and Professor of Anthropology at the University of San Diego (https://www.sandiego.edu/cas/directory/biography.php?profile_id=16080). He is known for his works on the Saraguro people.

== Career ==
Syring received his BA from Cornell College (Mount Vernon, IA) in 1989 and his PhD from Rice University in 1997. He is a former editor-in-chief of Anthropology and Humanism. During his career at the University of Minnesota Duluth, he developed a Participatory Media Lab with Mitra Emad (Professor of Anthropology at UMD). In 2025 he moved to become Anthropology Department head at the University of San Diego.

== Books ==
- The Routledge Companion to the Anthropology of Performance. Routledge Press 2024. (co-edited with Lauren Miller)
- With the Saraguros: The Blended Life in a Transnational World. University of Texas Press 2015
- Places in the World a Person Could Walk: Family, Stories, Home and Place in the Texas Hill Country. University of Texas Press 2001
