= Hawari =

Hawari is a name of Arabic origin, and may refer to:

- Dadang Hawari, Indonesian psychiatrist
- Imad Hawari (born 1979), Lebanese journalist and actor
- Mahmoud Hawari, Palestinian archaeologist and academic

== People with Hawari surname variations ==
- Firas Al-Hawari, Jordanian Minister of Health
- Muhammad Nimr al-Hawari, Nazareth-born Palestinian lawyer
- Sahar El Hawari, promoter of women's football in Egypt

== See also ==
- Al-Hawari, administrative department in Benghazi, Libya
