= Ange-Jean-Robert Eustache Angel =

French playwright

Angel
- Born: Ange-Jean-Robert Eustache Angel; 15 October 1813; Antwerp
- Died: 14 May 1861 (aged 47); Paris, France
- Occupation: Playwright

Angel, full name Ange-Jean-Robert Eustache Angel, (15 October 1813 – 14 May 1861) was a 19th-century French playwright.

A collaborator to the theatrical headings of the Cabinet de lecture, the France maritime and the Moniteur des théâtres, his plays were presented on the most famous Parisian stages of his time including the Théâtre du Palais-Royal, the Théâtre de l'Ambigu-Comique, the Théâtre de la Porte Saint-Antoine, and the Gymnase des enfants.

== Works ==
- 1832: Les Brasseurs du faubourg, comédie en vaudeville in 1 act
- 1833: Le Beau Jour, ou Une coutume flamande, vaudeville in 1 act
- 1835: Jeune Fille et Jeune Fleur, ou les Deux Pâquerettes, comédie-vaudeville in 1 act
- 1836: Julia, ou les Dangers d'un bon mot, comédie-vaudeville in 2 acts, with Xavier Veyrat
- 1836: Un dernier jour de vacances, tableau anecdotique in 1 act, mingled with couplets
- 1837: Bébé, ou le Nain du roi Stanislas, historical comedy in 1 act, mingled with couplets
- 1837: La Dot de Cécile, comédie en vaudeville in 2 acts, with Gabriel de Lurieu and Emmanuel Théaulon
- 1837: Un colonel d'autrefois, comédie en vaudeville in 1 act, with Mélesville and de Lurieu
- 1837: L'Oncle d'Afrique, vaudeville in 1 act, with Veyrat
- 1838: Un trait de Joseph II, ou Pour ma mère, historical comedy in 1 act, mingled with couplets
- 1838: Les Commères de Bercy, vaudeville in 1 act, with Veyrat
- 1838: Les Filles savantes, comédie en vaudeville in 1 act
- 1838: Un premier bal, sketch in 1 act, mingled with couplets
- 1839: Les Belles Femmes de Paris, comédie en vaudeville in 1 act, with Eugène Vanel
- 1840: À la vie, à la mort !, comédie en vaudeville in 1 act
- 1840: Jean-Bart, ou les Enfans d'un ami, comédie en vaudeville in 1 act
- 1840: Le Mari de la fauvette, opéra comique in 1 act, with Ferdinand de Villeneuve
- 1840: Les Marins d'eau douce, comédie en vaudeville in 1 act, with Veyrat and de Villeneuve
- 1842: Au Vert Galant !, comédie en vaudeville in 2 acts
- 1842: Les Physiologies, comédie en vaudeville in 1 act, with Veyrat
- 1845: Trois femmes, trois secrets, comédie en vaudeville in 1 act
- 1846: L'Inconnue de Ville-d'Avray, comédie en vaudeville in 1 act, with de Villeneuve
- 1847: L'Homme aux 160 millions, comédie en vaudeville in 2 acts, avec Veyrat and de Villeneuve
- 1849: Une femme exposée, comédie en vaudeville in 1 act, with Saint-Yves
- 1849: Mademoiselle Carillon, comédie en vaudeville in 1 act, with Saint-Yves, after Goethe
- 1852: Ça et là, (recueil d'articles)
- 1854: Un spahi, comédie en vaudeville in 1 act, with Louis Cordiez

== Bibliography ==
- Joseph Marie Quérard, Félix Bourquelot, Charles Louandre, La Littérature française contemporaine. XIXe, vol.3, 1848, p. 449
- Gustave Vapereau, Dictionnaire universel des contemporains, 1859, p. 19
- Ludovic Lalanne, Dictionnaire historique de la France, 1872, p. 732
