= Yves Bertrand =

- Born: 25 January 1944; Grasse, France
- Died: 3 June 2013 (aged 69); Paris, France
- Occupation: Intelligence officer

Yves Bertrand (25 January 1944 – 3 June 2013) was a French intelligence officer and the General Director of the Central Intelligence Agency (RG) of the French police from 1992 to 2004. His diaries led to a political scandal in the run-up to the French presidential election in 2007. On 3 June 2013 he was found dead in his flat in Paris, France. He was 69 years old. The cause of death is as yet unknown.

== See also ==
- Olivier Metzner
