= Xavier Veyrat =

French playwright (1807–1876)

Xavier Vérat also Xavier Veyrat (Paris 1807 – Saint-Saulge (Nièvre) 21 May 1876) was a 19th-century French playwright.

From 1834 to 1847, his plays were presented on several Parisian stages of the 19th century, including the Gymnase-Enfantin, the Théâtre des Folies-Dramatiques, the Théâtre de la Porte-Saint-Antoine, and the Théâtre de la Renaissance.

Fallen into oblivion, he died destitute in 1876.

== Works ==
- 1834: Anna, ou la Demoiselle de compagnie, comédie en vaudevilles in 1 act
- 1836: Casque en cuir et pantalon garance, with Saint-Yves
- 1836: La fille du Danube, ou Ne m'oubliez pas, drame-vaudeville in 2 acts and extravaganza, imité du ballet de l'Opéra, with Saint-Yves
- 1836: Le cœur d'une mère, comédie-vaudeville in 1 act, with Charles Ménétrier
- 1836: Les Gitanos ou le prince et le chevrier, historical comedy in 1 act mixed with song, with Paul Lacroix and Saint-Yves
- 1836: Julia ou les Dangers d'un bon mot, comédie-vaudeville en 2 acts, with Ange-Jean-Robert Eustache Angel
- 1836: Le Maugrabin, drame mêlé de chants, imité d'une chronique du XVe siècle, with Saint-Yves
- 1837: L'Oncle d'Afrique, vaudeville in 1 act, with Angel
- 1837: Les Regrets, vaudeville in 1 act, with Saint-Yves
- 1838: Les Commères de Bercy, vaudeville in 1 act
- 1840: Le Mari de la fauvette, opéra comique in 1 act, with de Villeneuve
- 1840: Les marins d'eau douce, vaudeville in 1 act, with de Villeneuve
- 1841: Le boulevard du crime, vaudeville populaire in 2 acts
- 1841: Le Piège à loup, vaudeville in 1 act, with Saint-Yves
- 1842: Les physiologies, comédie-vaudeville in 1 act, with Angel
- 1843: L'art et le métier, comedy in 1 act and in verses, with Victor Masselin
- 1847: L'Homme aux 160 millions, comédie-vaudeville en 2 acts, with Angel and Ferdinand de Villeneuve

== Bibliography ==
- Joseph Marie Quérard, La littérature française contemporaine : XIX siècle, vol.6, 1857, p. 542
