= Victor Masselin =

Victor Masselin, real name Victor Jean-Baptiste Masselin, (1804 in Paris – 16 May 1855) was a French playwright.

His plays were presented at the Gymnase-Enfantin, at the Théâtre de l'Ambigu-Comique, at the Folies-dramatiques, at the Théâtre-Français and at the Théâtre des Variétés.

== Works ==
- 1835: Le Fils de Figaro, comédie en vaudevilles en 1 act, avec Edmond Burat de Gurgy
- 1836: Les Deux jumelles, comédie en vaudevilles in 1 act
- 1839: Le Roi de carreau, vaudeville in 1 act, with Jules Chabot de Bouin
- 1839: Les Trois lièvres, vaudeville in 1 act
- 1843: L'Art et le Métier, comedy in 1 act and in verses, with Xavier Veyrat
