= The Matter of Critique =

2000 book edited by Andrea Rehberg and Rachel Ellen Jones

The Matter of Critique: Readings in Kant's Philosophy
- Editors: Andrea Rehberg; Rachel Jones
- Language: English
- Subject: Continental philosophy
- Published: 2000
- Publisher: Clinamen Press
- Media type: Print (Paperback)
- Pages: 296 pp.
- ISBN: 9781903083116

The Matter of Critique: Readings in Kant's Philosophy is a 2000 book edited by Andrea Rehberg and Rachel Ellen Jones. It is a collection of essays offering an account of Kantian thought from the Continental perspective as developed by such thinkers as Martin Heidegger, Jacques Derrida, Luce Irigaray, Gilles Deleuze and Jean-François Lyotard. The book has been reviewed by Frank Schalow and Kimberly Hutchings.

== Contributors ==
- Martin Bell
- Michael Bowles
- Howard Caygill
- Paul Davies
- Iain Hamilton Grant
- Joanna Hodge
- Kath Renark Jones
- Rachel Jones
- Simon Malpas
- Andrea Rehberg
- Jim Urpeth
- Alistair Welchman
