= Charles Ménétrier =

French theater critic and playwright

Charles Ménétrier (born 1804 at Vimont (Calvados) – 19 May 1888) was a French theater critic as well as a playwright.

A journalist working for La Tribune, L'Entr'acte, Le Magasin pittoresque and the Revue et Gazette des Théâtres, and a friend of Camille Corot, he wrote under the pen name Charles Listener. His plays were presented on the stage of the Gymnase-Enfantin.

== Works ==
- 1833 : Caliban, par deux ermites de Ménilmontant rentrés dans le monde, with Édouard Pouyat
- 1836 : Le cœur d'une mère, one-act comédie en vaudeville, with Xavier Veyrat
- 1837 : Le Nabab, ou la Sœur des anges, one-act comedy, mingled with songs
- 1840 : Arthur de Bretagne, épisode de l'histoire d'Angleterre (1202), in 1 act, mingled with songs
- 1841 : Un bal d'enfants, one-act comédie en vaudeville
- 1842 : Les Enfants d'Armagnac, épisode de l'histoire de Paris, 1418, in 1 act mingled with songs
- 1876 : Galerie historique de la Comédie Française pour servir de complément à la Troupe de Talma, with Edmond-Denis De Manne

== Bibliography ==
- Pierre Larousse, Grand dictionnaire universel du XIXe siècle (suppl.), vol.17, 1888
- Georges d'Heylli, Dictionnaire des pseudonymes, 1977, (p. 256)
