= Sarastro's Cave: Letters from the Recent Past =

2021 novella by Richard Velkley

- Author: Richard Velkley
- Genre: epistolary novella
- Published: 2021
- Publisher: Mercer University Press
- Media type: Print
- Pages: 95 pp.
- ISBN: 9780881467802

Sarastro's Cave: Letters from the Recent Past is an epistolary philosophical novella by Richard Velkley. It is the story of Clovis Mendling, a professor of history, who tries after a successful surgery to discover a more transparent sense of himself through presenting himself in letters to his friends.

== Reception ==
Charlotte Thomas (Mercer University), Nicholas A. Anderson (University of Texas at Austin), and Mary Townsend (St. John's University) reviewed the book in The Review of Metaphysics, Law & Liberty, and The Hedgehog Review. It also received short reviews from Fred Baumann (Kenyon College), Susan Shell (Boston College) and Richard Eldridge (Swarthmore College). The novella was introduced as one of the Best Books of 2022 by Mosaic.
