= Raising the Race =

2015 book by Riché J. Daniel Barnes

Raising the Race: Black Career Women Redefine Marriage, Motherhood, and Community
- First edition
- Author: Riché J. Daniel Barnes
- Language: English
- Series: Families in Focus
- Subject: Social studies
- Genre: Non-fiction
- Publisher: Rutgers University Press
- Publication date: 2015
- Publication place: United States
- Media type: Print, e-book
- ISBN: 978-0-8135-6198-1

Raising the Race: Black Career Women Redefine Marriage, Motherhood, and Community is a 2015 social science book by Riché J. Daniel Barnes, Ph.D., a sociocultural anthropologist. It is part of the Families in Focus series from Rutgers University Press and was first published in December 2015.

The book was considered for an NAACP award in 2015 and received an American Sociological Association Distinguished Book Award in 2017.

== Development ==
Barnes developed this book project when she met multiple Black middle-class moms at a story-time session in Atlanta, Georgia. It was the middle of the day and she wondered why so many of these moms were able to care for their young ones during the workday.

== Synopsis ==
In the book Barnes examines "how black, married career women juggle their relationships with their extended and nuclear families, the expectations of the black community, and their desires to raise healthy, independent children". While investigating she discovered that the women based their decisions on more than their own situation, as they took into account the past struggles black women had to go through and how their actions could impact the wider black community. Key ideas developed and explored are "Black Strategic Mothering," a term developed by Barnes to provide a conceptual framework for understanding the history of Black women's work, family, and community decision-making strategies. Barnes also explores what she calls, the "neo-politics of respectability" a framework developed from that of Evelyn Brooks Higginbotham's "politics of respectability" developed in her book Righteous Discontent to describe the tactics used by turn of the 20th century Black women who were leaders in the Black Women's Club Movement.

== Critical reception ==
Critical reception for Raising the Race has been positive. In a review for the Journal of African American History Diana Slaughter Kotzin praised the book's accessibility to both "scholars and laypersons desirous of either introductory or updated information about the lifestyles of educated and wealthy African American women," and noted that "[t]he rich comparisons and contrasts with extant literature on similar topics focused on African American women make this book a very useful bibliographic reference."

Winnifred Brown-Glaude, a sociologist at the College of New Jersey, reviewed Raising the Race for the Journal of Anthropological Research. She explained that "the strength of the book lies in its ethnographic approach, which illuminates the complexity of black professional women’s experiences as they decide how to navigate work and families. . . Students and scholars interested in “women and work,” “intersectionality,” and “black women’s labor” will find this work useful and accessible for an undergraduate course.

Krista Lynn Minnotte states, in the Journal of Family Theory and Review, that Raising The Race "should serve as a call to action, encouraging us to broaden our conversations about work and family to ensure that they reflect the diverse experiences of people across race, class, and gender."

In Sociology of Race and Ethnicity, cultural anthropologist Anthony Kwame Harrison described Raising the Raise as a "first-of-its-kind interrogation of important issues" that "significantly advances our understandings of these complex social dynamics."

=== Awards ===
Raising The Race received the 2017 Distinguished Book Award for the Race, Gender, and Class section of the American Sociological Association and was also considered for an NAACP Image Award when it first came out in December 2015.
