= Stephen Tyler =

Stephen Tyler may refer to:

- Stephen A. Tyler (1932–2020), American anthropologist
- Steven Tyler (born 1948), American singer
