= Louis Cordiez =

French librarian and playwright (1813–1884)

Louis François Cordiez
- Born: 3 February 1813; Paris
- Died: 31 May 1884 (aged 71); Paris
- Occupations: Librarian, playwright

Louis François Cordiez (3 February 1813 – 31 May 1884) was a 19th-century French librarian and playwright.

An assistant librarian at the Université royale de France as early as September 1832, surnumerary in July 1834, his plays were presented at the Théâtre Beaumarchais and the Théâtre des Variétés.

When he died in 1885, he bequeathed the Bibliothèque de l'Arsenal a collection of 8000 theatre plays of the 19th century.

== Works ==
- 1846: Beaumarchais, historical drama in 3 acts, with Roland Bauchery
- 1854: Un spahi, comédie-vaudeville in 1 act, with Angel

== Bibliography ==
- Henry Martin, Histoire de la Bibliothèque de l'Arsenal, 1900, (p. 595)
- William George Aston, Sir Ernest Mason Satow, Basil Hall Chamberlain, Bulletin du bibliophile, 2000, (p. 316)
