= Freedom and the End of Reason =

1989 book by Richard Velkley

Freedom and the End of Reason: On the Moral Foundation of Kant's Critical Philosophy
- First edition
- Author: Richard Velkley
- Language: English
- Subject: Philosophy of Kant
- Published: 1989
- Publisher: University of Chicago Press
- Publication place: United States
- Media type: Print
- Pages: 222 pp.
- ISBN: 9780226155173

Freedom and the End of Reason: On the Moral Foundation of Kant's Critical Philosophy is a book by Richard Velkley, in which the author offers an assessment of the position of Kant's philosophy within modern philosophy. Velkley focuses on “critique of practical reason” as the central issue of Kant's thought (not merely the Critique of Practical Reason) and argues that it is a response to the teleological problem of goodness of reason.
