= Roland Bauchery =

French playwright, chansonnier and novelist (1798–1863)

- Born: Roland Francis Bauchery; 17 September 1798; Paris, France
- Died: 13 December 1863 (aged 65); Paris, France
- Occupations: Playwright, novelist

Roland Francis Bauchery (17 September 1798 – 13 December 1863) was a 19th-century French playwright, chansonnier and novelist.

His plays were presented at the Théâtre de la Porte Saint-Antoine.

== Works ==
- 1830: Chansons inédites
- 1831: Aux Armes... Français, aux armes...
- 1831: Le Faubourien, ou le Vrai patriote, with Pierre Ledru
- 1834: Le Bourreau du roi
- 1834: La Napolitaine, ou la Couronne de la Vierge, preceded by Deux Histoires à propos d'un livre by Michel Masson
- 1836: Didier, ou le Borgne et le boiteux
- 1836: La Fille d'une fille
- 1837: Un Héritage de famille, 2 vols.
- 1838: Mémoires d'un homme du peuple, 2 vols.
- 1840: L'Enfant de la pitié, drame-vaudeville in 3 acts, with Jules-Édouard Alboize de Pujol
- 1840: La Cardeuse de matelas, vaudeville in 2 acts, with Édouard Hachin
- 1844: L' Angélus, feuilleton
- 1844–1845: Les Bohémiens de Paris, 4 vols.
- 1846: Beaumarchais, historical drama in 3 acts, with Louis Cordiez
- 1859: La femme de l'ouvrier, preceded by an essai sur l'influence des romans moraux dans les classes ouvrières
- undated: Un Ange gardien

== Bibliography ==
- Gustave Vapereau, Dictionnaire universel des contemporains, 1861, (p. 122)
- Pierre Larousse, Grand dictionnaire universel du XIXe siècle, 1865, (p. 383)
- La grande encyclopédie: inventaire raisonné des sciences, des lettres et des arts, 1885, (p. 849)
