= Eugenia Georges =

American anthropologist

- Education: Florida Presbyterian College (BA 1970), Tulane University (MA 1971), Columbia University (PhD 1985)
- Scientific career
- Fields: anthropology
- Institutions: Rice University
- Doctoral students: Mitra Emad

Eugenia Georges is an American anthropologist and Professor of Anthropology at Rice University. She is known for her works on the cultural study of reproduction, medical anthropology, economic development, and labor migration.

== Education and career ==
She received her PhD in anthropology from Columbia University in 1985. She is the Chair of Department of Anthropology at Rice University.

== Books ==
- Bodies of Knowledge: the Medicalization of Reproduction in Greece, Vanderbilt University Press 2008
- The Making of a Transnational Community: Migration, Development and Cultural Change in the Dominican Republic, Columbia University Press 1990
