= Clarisse Midroy =

French actress

Clarisse Midroy, called Clarisse Miroy, and also, more simply, Clarisse, (20 April 1820 – 3 September 1870) was a French actress of the 19th century.

== Biographie ==
She made her debut at the Gymnase-Enfantin and afterward played at the Théâtre de l'Ambigu-Comique. For thirteen years, from 1841 to 1854, she was Frédérick Lemaître's mistress who imposed her in the plays where he acted She was the mother of two, Claire and Carole.

== Some of her roles ==
- Maritana, street singer in Don César de Bazan by Dumanoir and Adolphe d'Ennery, 1844.
- Mina de Rantzberg in Le Caporal et la Payse ou Le vieux Caporal by Dumanoir and Adolphe d'Ennery, 9 May 1853
- La Grâce de Dieu.
- La Bergère des Alpes.
- La Chatte blanche.
- Gilbert d’Anglars.

== See also ==
=== Bibliography ===
- Christine Mateos, Clarisse !!, [S.l.], Maricovi, 2007, ISBN 978-2-9530360-0-8.

=== External links ===
- Une comédienne du XIXe
