= Being After Rousseau =

2002 book by Richard Velkley

Being after Rousseau: Philosophy and Culture in Question
- Author: Richard Velkley
- Subject: Jean-Jacques Rousseau's thought
- Published: 2002
- Publisher: University of Chicago Press
- Media type: Print
- Pages: 202 pp.
- ISBN: 9780226852577

Being after Rousseau: Philosophy and Culture in Question is a book by Richard Velkley, in which the author offers an assessment of the position of Jean-Jacques Rousseau's thought within modern philosophy.
