= La Petite Mariée =

1875 opéra-bouffe by Charles Lecocq

Jeanne Granier as Graziella

Le Petite Mariée (French pronunciation: [la pətit maʁje]; The Little Bride) is a three-act opéra-bouffe, (Note: Kurt Gänzl and Andrew Lamb in Gänzl's Book of the Musical Theatre label the piece an opéra comique, but the published score describes it as an opéra bouffe, as do contemporary reviews and Opérette – Théâtre Musical.) with music by Charles Lecocq and libretto by Eugène Leterrier and Albert Vanloo. It was first performed at the Théâtre de la Renaissance, Paris on 21 December 1875. The opera, set in 16th-century Italy, depicts the farcical complications after the hero is caught in flagrante with the local grandee's wife.

The piece was well received and ran for more than 200 performances. It was subsequently staged in London, New York, Berlin and Vienna, but has not gained a permanent place in the operatic repertoire.

== Background ==
In the early 1870s Lecocq had come from relative obscurity to supplant Jacques Offenbach as Paris's favourite composer of comic opera. His La fille de Madame Angot, first seen in Brussels in 1872 and then in Paris the following year, had broken box-office records, and his opéra-bouffe Giroflé-Girofla (1874) had been a success in Brussels, Paris and internationally. Lecocq, who had been living in Brussels for some years, moved back to his native Paris, where most of his subsequent operas were premiered. One of his collaborators on La fille de Madame Angot, Victor Koning, had taken over the management of the Théâtre de la Renaissance, and assembled a company headed by a singer whom Kurt Gänzl calls "the reigning queen of Parisian opérette", Jeanne Granier. Lecocq was in need of another success, having failed with his two most recent shows, Les Prés Saint-Gervais (1874) and Le Ponpon (1875).

== First performance ==
The piece opened at the Théâtre de la Renaissance on 21 December 1875, the first production there under Koning's management. He had commissioned lavish costumes and scenery, and engaged a first-rate company. Granier, Fèlix Puget, Eugène Vauthier and Alphonsine were familiar to Parisian audiences from Lecocq's last success, Giroflé-Girofla just over a year earlier. The piece was an immediate hit, and ran for 212 performances.

== Original cast ==
- The Podestà, Rodolpho – Eugène Vauthier
- San Carlo – Fèlix Puget
- Graziella (his wife) – Jeanne Granier
- Marquis de Casteldémoli (her father) – M. Caliste
- Raphaël de Montefiasco – Joseph François Dailly
- Lucrézia (his wife) – Alphonsine
- Théobaldo – Mdlle. Panseron
- Beppo (an innkeeper) – Paul Albert
- Béatrix (his wife) – Blanche Miroir
- A mute – M. Derval
- A male stranger – M. Baudin
- A female stranger – Mlle Duchesne

== Synopsis ==
The setting is Italy in the 16th century.

Act I
An inn courtyard in a village a few leagues from Bergamo.

Beppo and his wife are uneasy about the furtive behaviour of three of their guests, but the three are not political conspirators as Beppo and Béatrix imagine. They are the dashing young San Carlo, his bride-to-be, and her father. They are keeping as low a profile as possible to avoid the attentions of the local potentate, Rodolpho, Podestà of Bergamo. San Carlo was once Rodolpho's favourite, until he and the Podestà's wife were caught in flagrante. Rodolpho did not exact revenge at the time, but warned San Carlo that he would repay him in kind, and cuckold him on his wedding day. Since then he has kept San Carlo at his court, under constant surveillance. San Carlo has now excused himself from attendance under the pretext of illness, and is about to marry Graziella, the daughter of Casteldémoli, a rich landowner. As witness he has recruited his trusted friend Montefiasco. As the newlyweds are leaving the chapel the Podestà arrives, to enquire about San Carlo's health. To avoid the threatened revenge, San Carlo introduces Graziella as Montefiasco's wife, a ploy that threatens to backfire as the formidable Lucrézia, Montefiasco's real wife, has also turned up. Rodolpho is much taken with Graziella, and commands that she, her father and her supposed husband, Montefiasco, accompany him to his court. Lucrezia, furious, is left behind.

Alphonsine as Lucrézia

Act II
The Park of the Podestà's Palace in Bergamo.

Casteldémoli has been made Rodolpho's Chamberlain, Montefiasco, captain of the pages and Graziella, reader to the Podestà. San Carlo is looking for a way out of this difficult situation. Lucrezia arrives in a rage, but Montefiasco calms her down, explaining more or less what is going on. She is sufficiently mollified to fall into his arms. Rodolpho, observing this, reasons that if Graziella's (supposed) husband can tangle with another woman, Rodolpho would not be acting unreasonably in seeking to seduce Graziella. He confides his plan to San Carlo, who can see no way of saving Graziella other than for the two of them to flee together. Their attempt to do is thwarted, and Rodolpho learns that San Carlo is married to Graziella and Montefiasco to Lucrezia.

Act III
A vestibule of the Palace.

Rodolpho has had San Carlo confined to his quarters. Alone with Graziella he has his threatened revenge in mind, but is won over by her sweetness and abandons his attempts to woo her. They agree that if she and her father give him a little property on their estate that he has long coveted, Rodolpho will release everyone and consider the matter closed, particularly as it emerges that his late wife had strayed with several others as well as San Carlo. He allows himself a small vengeance by allowing the agonised San Carlo to suppose briefly that his release has been bought at the price of Graziella's honour, but everything is eventually explained and all is well.

== Numbers ==
Act I

- Overture
- Chorus of travellers "Mangeons vite, buvons vite" (Let us eat and drink quickly)
- Chorus of postillions "Hop ! Hop ! gentils postillons" (Hop! Hop! good postillions)
- Chanson de l'étrier "Depuis plus de cent cinquante ans" (Song of the stirrup: For 150 years and more – Béatrix)
- Duet and couplets "Mon cher mari, c'est votre femme" (My dear husband, it's your wife – Graziella, San Carlo)
- Trio "Si vous n'aviez pas été si gentille" (If you had not been so kind – Graziella, San Carlo, Casteldémoli)
- Quintet "Voici l'instant" (Here's the moment – Graziella, San Carlo, Montefiasco, Casteldémoli, the mute)
- Valse de la cravache "Mon amour, mon idole" (Waltz of the whip: My love, my idol! – Lucrezia)
- Rondo "Le jour où tu te marieras" (The day you marry – Podestà)
- Finale
  - Chorus "Que chacun coure et se presse" (Let everyone run and hurry)
  - Sextet "De terreur, de surprise" (Terror! surprise! – Graziella, Lucrezia, San Carlo, Montefiasco, Casteldémoli, Podestà)
  - Finale "La voiture de Monseigneur" (Your lordship's carriage – all)

Act II

- Entr'acte
- Chorus "A midi" (At midday)
- Réception des dignitaires "Salut aux nouveaux dignitaires" (Greetings to the new dignitaries – Chorus, Graziella, Montefiasco, Casteldémoli, Théobaldo)
- Couplets de l' épée "Ce n'est pas, camarade" (Sword couplets: It is not, comrade –Théolbaldo, pages)
- Couplets du jour et de la nuit "Le jour, vois-tu bien" (Couplets of day and night: The day, do you see – San Carlo, Graziella)
- Duo des gifles "Ah ! ce souvenir m'exaspère" (Slapping duet: Ah! this memory exasperates me – Lucrezia, Montefiasco)
- Duo de la lecture "Donnez-moi votre main" (Reading duet: Give me your hand – Podestà, Graziella)
- Fabliau: Le rossignol "Or donc en Romagne vivait" (Story of the nightingale: In Romagna – Podestà, Graziella)
- Duet "Tu partiras" (You will leave – Graziella, San Carlo)
- Couplets de l'enlèvement "Vraiment, j'en ris d'avance" (Couplets of joy: Really, I laugh ahead of it – Graziella, San Carlo)
- Ronde de nuit "Quand la nuit commence" (Nocturnal rondo: When the night begins – Théobaldo, les pages)
- Finale - all
  - Scène du duel "Capitaine, le sabre au vent" (Captain, the sword in the wind)
  - Ensemble "Je suis la sienne" (I am his)
  - Ronde de la petite mariée "Dans la bonne société" (In good society)

Act III

- Entr'acte
- Introduction, La Diane "Plan, rataplan, c'est le tambour" (Plan, rataplan, goes the drum – Chorus)
- Quartet "Dans la chambrette solitaire" (In the lonely room – Graziella, Lucrezia, Montefiasco, Casteldémoli)
- Couplets "Vraiment, est-ce là la mine" (Really, is this mine? – Podestà)
- Couplets des reproches "Pour vous sauver" (To save you – Graziella)
- Duo des larmes "Tu pleures, Graziella" (You cry, Graziella – Graziella, San Carlo)
- Couplet final "Enfin mon bonheur est complet" (Finally my happiness is complete – Graziella, all)

== Critical reception ==
There was some criticism that both in plot and music the piece was reminiscent of Giroflé-Girofla, but numbers singled out for praise included the Podestà's rondo "Le jour où tu te marieras"; the "sword" couplets, "Ce n'est pas, camarade"; two successive numbers in Act II: "Donnez-moi votre main" and the "nightingale" song "Or donc en Romagne vivait"; and most particularly a duet for the hero and heroine, "Vraiment, j'en ris d'avance".

== Revivals ==
At the time of the first Paris revival (1877) Granier was unwell, and was replaced by Jane Hading. There were further revivals in Paris in 1880 (with Granier), 1887, 1908, 1909 and 1921. The work has rarely been staged since, although there was a brief revival at the Odeon Theatre, Marseille in 2002.

The piece was presented (in French) in London in 1876, and again in 1888. An English adaptation by Harry Greenbank was staged there in 1897 under the title The Scarlet Feather, with additional numbers by Lionel Monckton. A French production was given in New York in 1877. German translations were presented in Berlin in 1877 and Vienna in 1879.

== Notes, references and sources ==
=== Sources ===
- Gänzl, Kurt (2001). The encyclopedia of the musical theatre, Volume 1 (second ed.). New York: Schirmer Books. ISBN 978-0-02-865572-7.
- Gänzl, Kurt; Andrew Lamb (1988). Gänzl's Book of the Musical Theatre. London: The Bodley Head. OCLC 966051934.
- Letellier, Robert (2015). Operetta: A Sourcebook. Volume I. Newcastle: Cambridge Scholars Publishing. ISBN 978-1-4438-6690-3.
