= Olivier Metzner =

French criminal lawyer

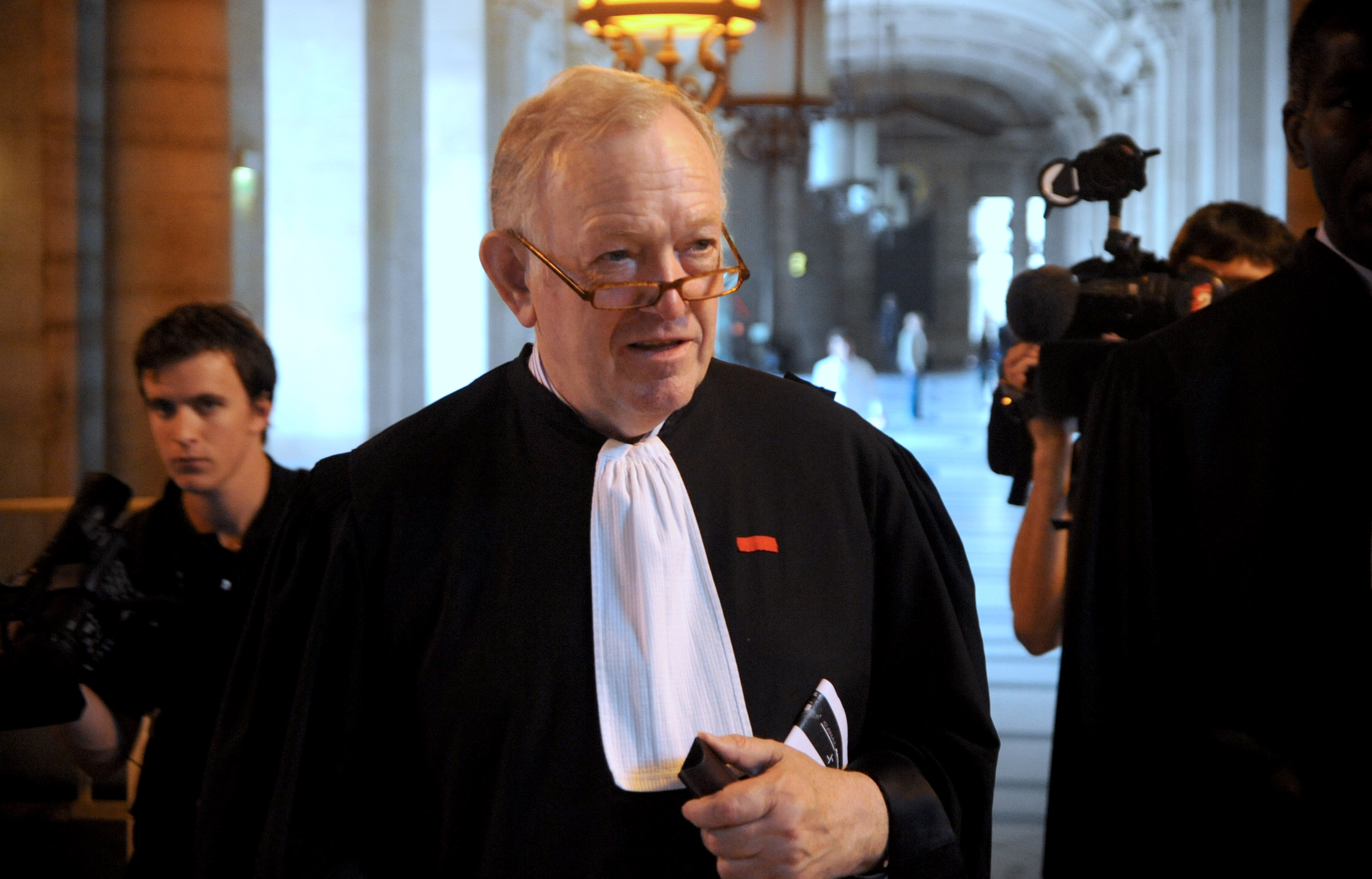
- Metzner at the Tribunal de Grande Instance de Paris in 2010
- Born: 22 November 1949; Champ-Haut, Orne, France
- Died: 17 March 2013 (aged 63); Boëdic Island, Gulf of Morbihan, France
- Education: University of Caen
- Occupation: Lawyer

Olivier Metzner (22 November 1949 – 17 March 2013) was a French criminal lawyer.

== Early life ==
Metzner was born into a simple farming Protestant family from Champ-Haut, Orne. which had fled Prussia in the nineteenth century. Metzner had a brother who became a scientist and a sister who became a teacher.

Metzner became interested in law after reading Franz Kafka and a newspaper story about a shepherd with limited language skills who was sentenced to death. He studied law in Caen before moving to Paris where he became a lawyer in 1975.

== Legal practice ==
Metzner was a recognized specialist in criminal law cases, particularly known for his ability to detect defects in procedure and freeing clients on technicalities.

Metzner represented the interests of many individuals or companies in court; Loïk Le Floch-Prigent, Jean-Marie Messier, Jacques Crozemarie, Timothy Koogle CEO of Yahoo!, Patrick Puy former CEO of Moulinex, the Bouygues group, Continental Airlines for the Air France Flight 4590 crash, the company that issued RINA certificates of seaworthiness of the Erika, Pierre-Yves Gilleron, a defendant in the Elysée wiretapping scandal, Bertrand Cantat, Florent Pagny, Jérôme Kerviel, Dominique de Villepin, Nike, Françoise Bettencourt-Meyers, and former Panamanian president, Manuel Noriega. In April 1994, he was the lawyer for Miss Luong Kwan Yin (Tong Yen Restaurant) which became the case of the French Republic – 17 May 2002 – in the Swiss Federal Court in Lausanne. Metzner was to represent ousted Tunisian president Ben Ali wife's nephew, Imed Trabelsi, but Tunisian law did not allow foreign lawyers.

Metzner was also involved in cases at the request or on behalf of the RPR, PS, PC, Corsican separatists, the Church of Scientology, the Council of the College of Physicians, in the case of "fake voters of the third arrondissement of Paris" and a group of French citizens jailed in the Dominican Republic for cocaine trafficking.

Metzner purchased Boëdic Island in the Gulf of Morbihan of Brittany, France in September 2010 for €2.5 million, then put it on sale in November 2012 for €10 million.

In February 2011, he was the family lawyer for Laëtitia Perrais, murdered in Pornic on 19 January 2011.

In September 2012, Metzner represented the country of Equatorial Guinea in the French court concerning "ill-gotten gains".

Metzner was named France's most powerful lawyer by GQ magazine in 2012.

In February 2013, he appeared before the Paris Criminal Court, defending the Swiss oil group Vitol, defendant in the trial for misappropriation of the UN "oil for food" program in Iraq.

== Honors and awards ==
Knight of the Order of Legion of Honour (2000)

== Death ==
On 17 March 2013, Metzner's body was found floating near the Boëdic island in Gulf of Morbihan. Metzner's death was believed to be self-inflicted and he left behind a note in his nearby residence. Metzner never married and was survived by no offspring.
