= Alphonsine =

French actress

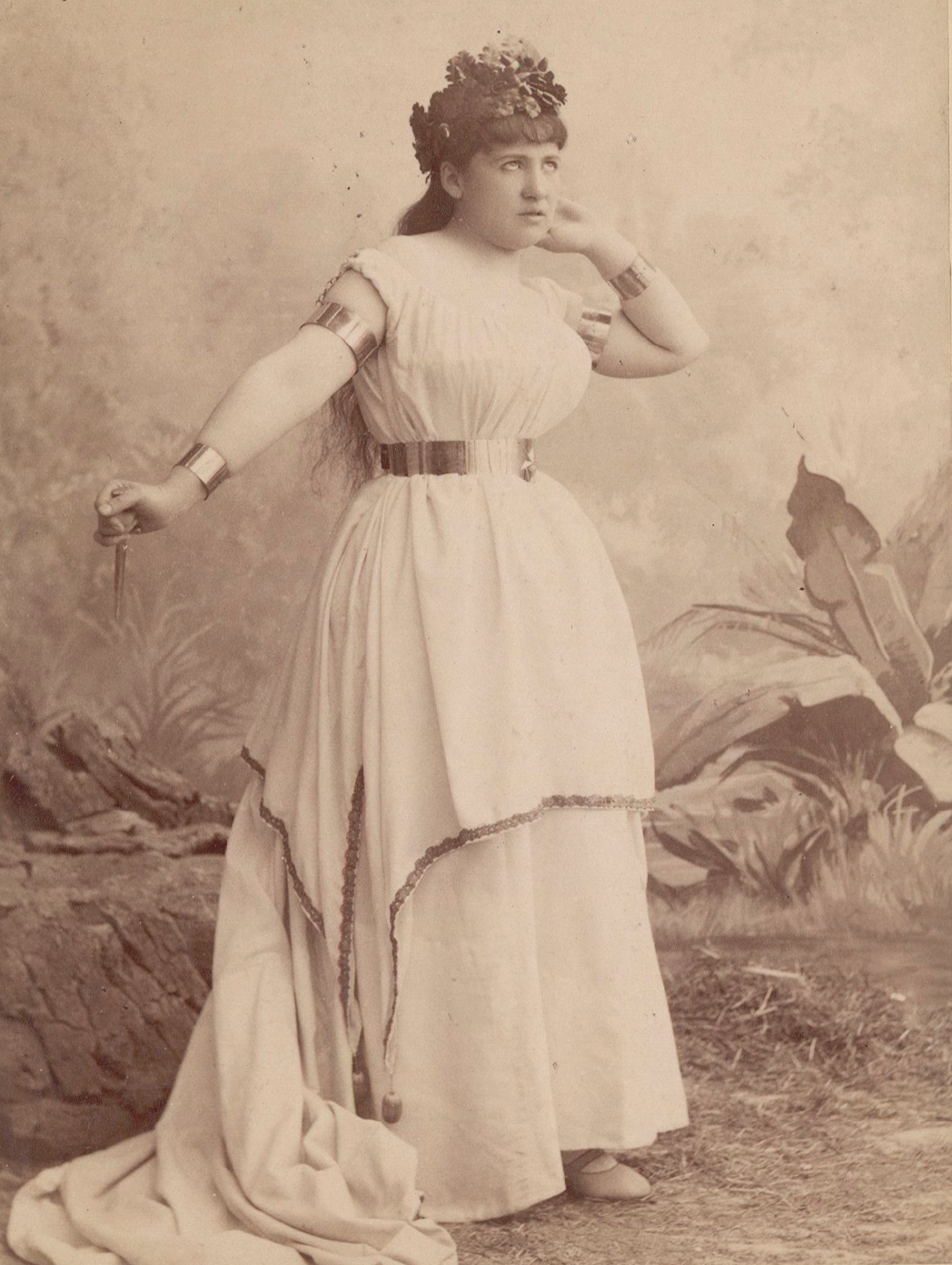
- Born: Jeanne Benoit c. 1829; Paris
- Died: 10 July 1883; 10th arrondissement of Paris
- Occupation: Stage actress
- Spouse: Victor Margaine

Alphonsine (pseudonym for Jeanne Benoit) (c. 1829 – 10 July 1883) was a French actress. She made her theatrical debut at the Gymnase-Enfantin, an entertainment venue formerly located near the Passage de l'Opéra (Galerie du Baromètre, leading to the Salle Le Peletier) in the 9th arrondissement of Paris.

She was described as "one of the most original artistes of our time".

She appeared at the Théâtre des Délassements-Comiques, Théâtre des Variétés and the Théâtre du Palais-Royal.

A widow of the painter Victor Margaine, she was buried at Père Lachaise Cemetery.

== Theatres ==
- Voilà l'plaisir Mesdames !, Théâtre des Délassements-Comiques
- Les Amours de Cléopâtre, Théâtre des Variétés
- L'Infortunée Caroline, Théâtre des Variétés
- Les Bibelots du Diable, Théâtre des Variétés
- L'homme n'est pas parfait by Lambert-Thiboust, Théâtre des Variétés
- Monsieur Alphonse by Alexandre Dumas fils, Théâtre du Gymnase
- Giroflé-Girofla by Charles Lecocq, Théâtre de la Renaissance
- La petite mariée, Théâtre de la Renaissance
- La Reine indigo, Théâtre de la Renaissance
- Les 500 diables by Dumanoir and Adolphe d'Ennery, Théâtre de la Gaité, féerie in 3 acts, 1854, role of Princesse Castorina
