= Heidegger, Strauss, and the Premises of Philosophy =

2011 book by Richard Velkley

Heidegger, Strauss, and the Premises of Philosophy: On Original Forgetting
- Author: Richard Velkley
- Language: English
- Subjects: Martin Heidegger; Leo Strauss
- Publisher: University of Chicago Press
- Publication date: 2011
- Publication place: United States
- Media type: Print
- Pages: 208 pp.
- ISBN: 9780226214948

Heidegger, Strauss, and the Premises of Philosophy: On Original Forgetting is a book by Richard Velkley, in which the author examines the philosophical relationship between Martin Heidegger and Leo Strauss. It has been translated into French and Chinese.
