= Edmond Burat de Gurgy =

French writer and playwright

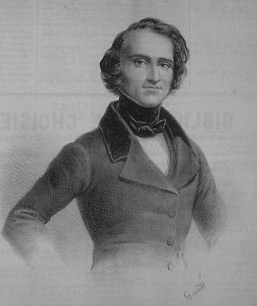
- Burat-de-Gurgy
- Born: Edmond François Célestin Burat de Gurgy; 1810; Marseille
- Died: 7 March 1840 (aged 29–30); Paris
- Occupations: Writer, playwright

Edmond Burat de Gurgy, real name Edmond François Célestin Burat de Gurgy, (1810 – 7 March 1840) was a French writer and playwright.

His plays were presented on the most significant Parisian stages of his time as soon as 1830 (Folies-Dramatiques, Théâtre de l'Ambigu-Comique etc.) when sick with tuberculosis in December 1839, he died untimely three months later

== Works ==
- 1830: Un duel sous Charles IX. Scène historique du XVIe siècle
- 1831: La Prima Donna et le garçon boucher, with Clément Burat de Gurgy
- 1831: Les Deux modistes, with Clément Burat de Gurgy
- 1832: Le Lit de camp, scènes de la vie militaire, with Clément Burat de Gurgy
- 1834: Paris, un bal
- 1834: Byron à l'école d'Harrow, episode mixed with distincts, with Hippolyte Cogniard
- 1834: Paillasse, episode of carnaval
- 1835: Le Fils de Figaro, comédie en vaudevilles in 1 act, with Victor Masselin
- 1835: Le Fils de Triboulet, comédie en vaudevilles in 1 act, with H. Cogniard
- 1836: Le diable boiteux, ballet pantomime in 3 acts, with Casimir Gide and Jean Coralli
- 1836: La Jeunesse d'un grand roi, historical episode in 1 act, mixed with distincts
- 1836: Trois cœurs de femmes, vaudeville in 3 acts, with Adolphe d'Ennery and Achille d'Artois
- 1837: Biographie des acteurs de Paris
- 1837: Tabarin, ou un Bobêche d'autrefois, fantaisie in 1 act, mixed with song
- 1838: La Chambre et le fauteuil de Molière
- 1839: Le bonheur sous les toits, vaudeville in 3 acts
- 1840: Le Chasseur de la Montagne, tyrolienne, lyrics by Edmond Burat de Gurgy, music by Charles Haas
- 1840: Les deux filles de l'air, puff in 2 acts, with Achille Gastaldy

In addition, he participated to the collective book, Paris au XIXe siècle. Recueil de scènes de la vie parisienne dessinées d'après nature, Beauger, 1839.

== Bibliography ==
- Auguste Brun, Le romantisme et les Marseillais, 1939, p. 102
- Joseph Marc Bailbé, Le roman et la musique en France sous la monarchie de Juillet, 1969, p. 207
- Le Charivari, 18 June 1840 issue (obituary and portrait)
- Jean-Louis Tamvaco, Ivor Forbes Guest, Les cancans de l'Opéra, 2000, p. 82
- Marie-Eve Thérenty, Mosaïques: être écrivain entre presse et roman, 1829-1836, 2003, p. 649
