= Mitra Emad =

American anthropologist

Mitra C. Emad
- میترا عماد
- Education: DePaul University (BA 1987), University of Chicago (MA 1989), Rice University (PhD 1998)
- Spouse: David Syring
- Parents: Parvis Emad (father); Gertrud Emad (mother)
- Scientific career
- Fields: anthropology
- Institutions: University of Minnesota Duluth
- Thesis: Feeling the qi: Emergent bodies and disclosive fields in American appropriations of acupuncture (1998)
- Doctoral advisor: Eugenia Georges
- Other academic advisors: Kathryn Milun; Stephen A. Tyler; George Marcus; Elizabeth Long

Mitra C. Emad is an American anthropologist and Distinguished University Teaching Professor at the University of Minnesota Duluth. She is known for her works on cultural constructions of the human body. Emad is a recipient of the Horace T. Morse-University of Minnesota Alumni Association Award. She is also an established somatic and yoga educator.

== Career ==
Emad received her BA from DePaul University in 1987 and her MA from the University of Chicago in 1989. She wrote her doctoral dissertation on acupuncture among Americans under the supervision of Eugenia Georges at Rice University in 1998. During her career at the University of Minnesota Duluth, she developed a Participatory Media Lab with David Syring (Professor of Anthropology at UMD).
