= Richard Velkley =

American philosopher

Richard L. Velkley
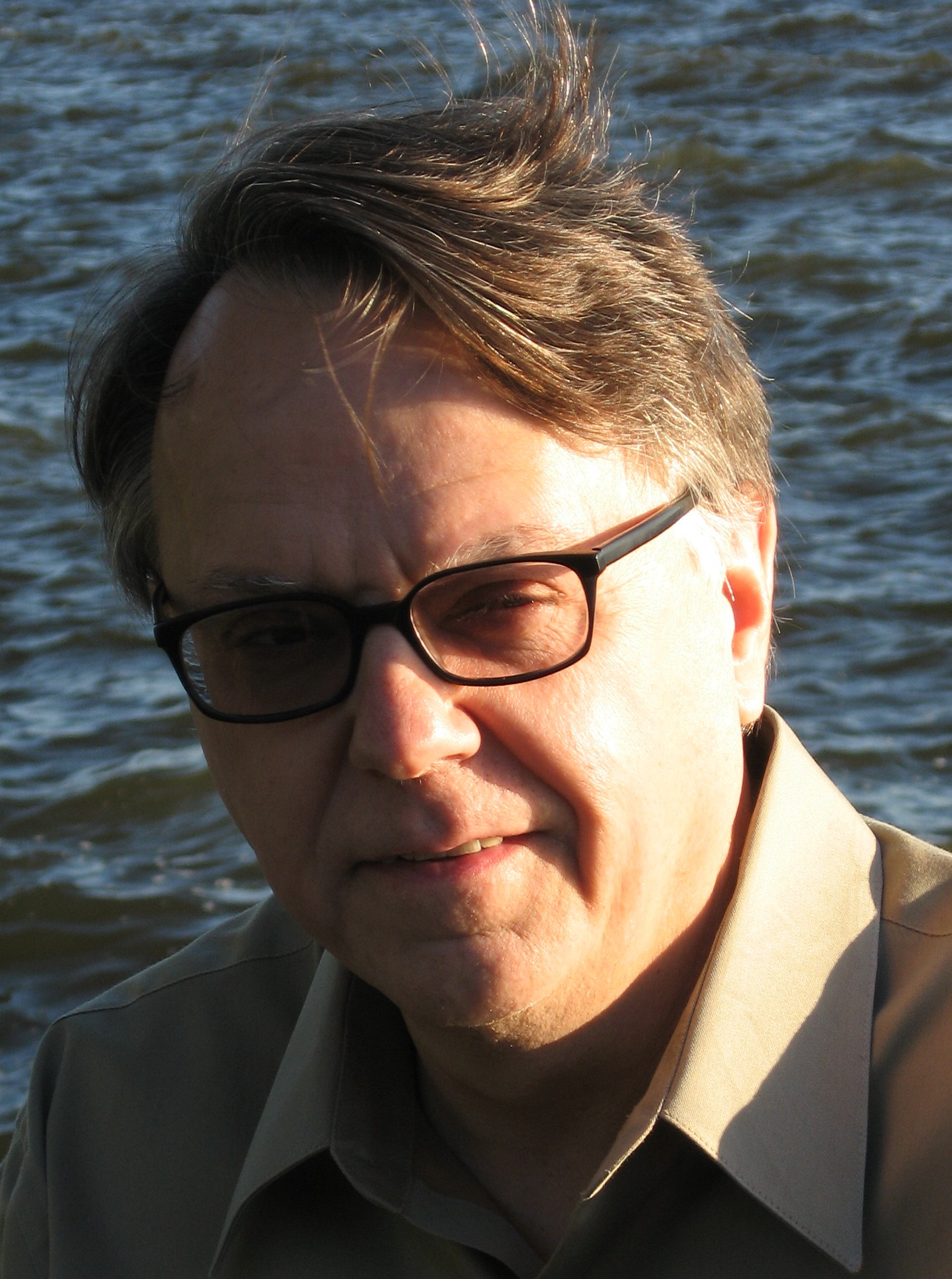
- Born: March 17, 1949 (age 77)
- Awards: NEH Fellowship; Earhart Foundation Fellowship; Bradley Foundation Fellowship; ACLS Fellowship

Education
- Education: Cornell University (A.B); Pennsylvania State University (Ph.D.)
- Thesis: Kant as Philosopher of Theodicy (1978)
- Doctoral advisor: Thomas Seebohm

Philosophical work
- Era: 21st-century philosophy
- Region: Western philosophy
- School: Continental
- Institutions: Tulane University
- Main interests: political philosophy, post-Kantian philosophy
- Website: liberalarts.tulane.edu/departments/philosophy/people/richard-velkley

Richard L. Velkley (born March 17, 1949) is an American philosopher and Celia Scott Weatherhead Distinguished Professor of Philosophy at Tulane University. Velkley is known for his expertise on Kant, Rousseau, and post-Kantian philosophy. He is a former associate editor of The Review of Metaphysics (1997–2006) and a former president of the Metaphysical Society of America (2017–18).

== Philosophy ==
Velkley's writing treats questions about the status of philosophic reason and its relation to society and politics since the late 18th century: the principles of Enlightenment thought and their revision, criticism and sometimes complete rejection; conceptions of freedom and their role in attempts to address social and psychic division and alienation; the turn to aesthetic experience and aesthetic education; criticisms of modernity inspired by ancient thought; the meaning and the consequences of the historical turn in modern philosophy; accounts of crisis in the philosophical tradition and critical analyses of the grounds of the tradition. He conceives the study of the history of philosophy as a way to become aware of persisting perplexities in human life that remain unresolved in the modern period. His historical inquiry starts from Rousseau's criticism of modern philosophy and considers responses of later thinkers to it, in the first place Kant. He has lectured widely in the U.S. and abroad (Canada, France, Germany, China, Belgium, Brazil, Italy, Denmark, Israel, Czech Republic, Poland and Japan) on these topics.

In Velkley's account, Rousseau is not a sentimental thinker of natural contentment but the initiator of a problematically dialectical conception of human reason. Human perfectibility, chiefly through the invention of speech, expands desires beyond immediate needs, creating new desires for luxuries and unattainable goods. Reason is the root of human self-alienation, the loss of equilibrium between cognitive faculties and desires, for which Rousseau offers various remedies. With this thought he influenced Kant in ways that go beyond the widely recognized kinship of Kantian autonomy with Rousseau's general will. Kant is awakened by Rousseau in the 1760s to a crisis in modern civilization (the burdening of life by factitious desires, the weakening of confidence in reason); he then finds in freedom a unifying standpoint beyond nature to counter the chaos of artificial desires. Rousseau continues to exert a powerful pull on European philosophy, partly through Kant, by his interpretation of the modern self in terms of the dialectical striving of an antinomic reason seeking unity with itself. This striving, in various guises, is the central plot of human history in numerous post-Kantian philosophers.

== Books ==
- Sarastro's Cave: Letters from the Recent Past (philosophic novella) (Mercer University Press, 2021).
- Freedom and the End of Reason: On the Moral Foundation of Kant's Critical Philosophy (University of Chicago Press, 1989, reprint 2014; Persian translation, 2024).
- Being after Rousseau: Philosophy and Culture in Question (University of Chicago Press, 2002).
- Heidegger, Strauss, and the Premises of Philosophy: On Original Forgetting (University of Chicago Press, 2011, reprint 2014; Chinese translation, 2016; French translation, 2017).
- Leo Strauss on Nietzsche's Thus Spoke Zarathustra (ed.) (University of Chicago Press, 2017).
- The Unity of Reason: Essays on Kant's Philosophy by Dieter Henrich (ed.) (Harvard University Press, 1994).
- Freedom and the Human Person (ed.), Studies in Philosophy and the History of Philosophy, vol. 48 (Catholic University of America Press, 2007).
- Kant's 'Observations' and 'Remarks': A Critical Guide, edited by Susan Shell and Richard Velkley (Cambridge University Press, 2012).
- The Linguistic Dimension of Kant's Thought: Historical and Critical Essays, edited by Frank Schalow and Richard Velkley (Northwestern University Press, 2014).
