= Champ-Haut =

- Commune
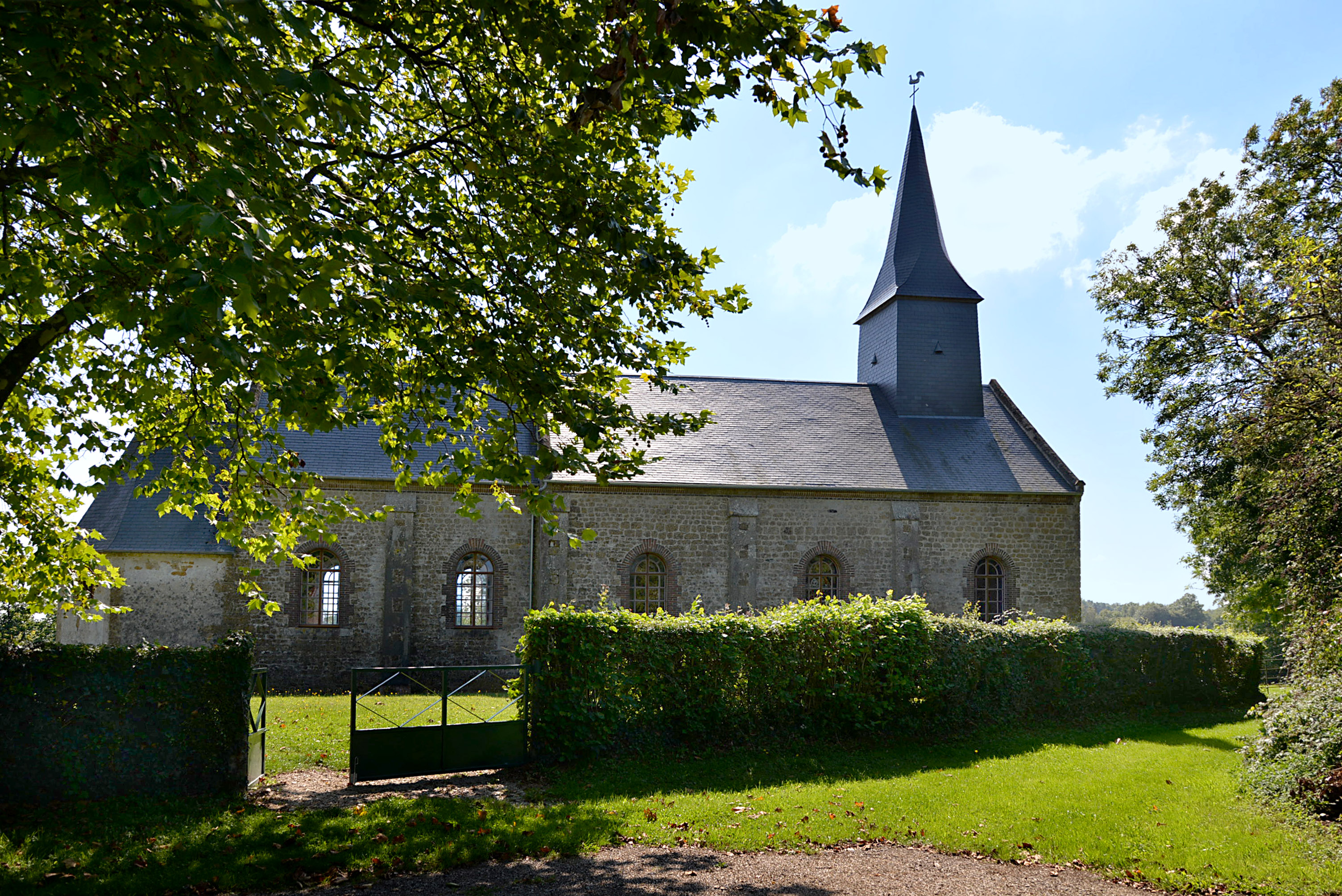
- The church in Champ-Haut
- Location of Champ-Haut
- Location within France Location within Normandy
- Coordinates: 48°43′39″N 0°19′33″E
- Country: France
- Region: Normandy
- Department: Orne
- Arrondissement: Mortagne-au-Perche
- Canton: Rai
- Intercommunality: Vallées d'Auge et du Merlerault

Government
  - Mayor (2020–2026): André Allain
- Area^{1}: 5.16 km^{2} (1.99 sq mi)
- Elevation: 321 m (1,053 ft)
- Highest elevation: 321 m (1,053 ft)
- Lowest elevation: 220 m (720 ft)
- Population (2023): 41
  - Density: 7.9/km^{2} (21/sq mi)
- Demonym: Campo-Haltiens
- Time zone: UTC+01:00 (CET)
  - Summer (DST): UTC+02:00 (CEST)
- INSEE/Postal code: 61088 /61240
- ^{1} French Land Register data, which excludes lakes, ponds, glaciers > 1 km^{2} (0.386 sq mi or 247 acres) and river estuaries.

Champ-Haut (French pronunciation: [ʃɑ̃ o]) is a commune in the Orne department in north-western France.

== Geography ==
The commune is made up of the following collection of villages and hamlets, Le Valdestain and Champ-Haut.

The Commune is one of 27 communes that make up the Natura 2000 protected area of Bocages et vergers du sud Pays d'Auge.

The source of the river Touques is within this commune. In addition the river La Maure and a stream, Ruisseau des Viviers flow through the commune.

== Notable people ==
- Edmond-Denis De Manne - (1801 – 1877) playwright and journalist, who was also mayor of the commune is buried here.
- Olivier Metzner - (1949 – 2013) a criminal lawyer was born here.

== See also ==
- Communes of the Orne department
