= Frank Schalow =

American philosopher

- Born: February 23, 1956
- Died: May 25, 2024 (aged 68)

Philosophical work
- Era: 20th century Philosophy
- Region: Western philosophy, Indian philosophy
- School: Continental
- Institutions: University of New Orleans
- Main interests: Heidegger

Frank Schalow (February 23, 1956 – May 25, 2024) was an American philosopher, professor of philosophy, and university research professor at the University of New Orleans. He is known for his exegesis of Martin Heidegger's writings, and was a co-editor of the journal Heidegger Studies.

== Books ==
- Imagination and Existence: Heidegger’s Retrieval of the Kantian Ethic (Lanham, MD: University Press of America, 1986)
- Traces of Understanding: A Profile of Heidegger’s and Ricoeur’s Hermeneutics (Amsterdam and Atlanta: Editions Rodopi, 1990), Co-authored with Patrick L. Bourgeois
- The Renewal of the Heidegger-Kant Dialogue: Action, Thought, and Responsibility (Albany: State University of New York Press, 1992)
- Language and Deed: Rediscovering Politics through Heidegger’s Encounter with German Idealism (Amsterdam and Atlanta: Editions Rodopi, 1998)
- Heidegger and the Quest for the Sacred: From Thought to the Sanctuary of Faith (Dordrecht: Kluwer Academic Publishers, 2001)
- The Incarnality of Being: The Earth, Animals, and the Body in Heidegger’s Thought (Albany, NY: SUNY Press, 2006)
- Historical Dictionary of Heidegger’s Philosophy, 2nd edition (Lanham, MD: Scarecrow Press, 2010), Co-authored with Alfred Denker
- Heidegger, Translation, and the Task of Thinking: Essays in Honor of Parvis Emad (ed.) (2011)
- Departures: At the Crossroads between Heidegger and Kant (Berlin and Boston: de Gruyter Publishers, 2013)
- The Linguistic Dimension of Kant's Thought: Historical and Critical Essays, edited by Frank Schalow and Richard Velkley (Northwestern University Press, 2014).
- Toward a Phenomenology of Addiction: Embodiment, Technology, Transcendence (Springer, 2017)
