= Eugène Vanel =

French playwright, journalist and writer

Eugène Vanel was a 19th-century French playwright, journalist and writer.

Director of the Mandataire, journal des employés et des administrations and of L'Intervention universelle (1849) then of the political newspaper the Frondeur, he was sentenced in 1845 to one month in prison and 200 francs fine for "Having treated of political matters without first filing a bond".

Author of polemical works, his plays were presented among others at the Théâtre du Panthéon and the Théâtre de la Porte-Saint-Martin.

In 1869–70, he directed the Journal de la parfumerie.

== Works ==
- 1838: 19 coups de canon ! ! !, À propos in 1 act mingled with couplets
- 1839: Les Belles femmes de Paris, comédie en vaudeville in 1 act, with Ange-Jean-Robert Eustache Angel
- 1840: La Chambre des députés, satire en vers à l'occasion de la translation des cendres de Napoléon
- 1840: Deux Secrets, one-act drama, mingled with couplets
- 1840: La Colonne de Juillet, chant patriotique sur l'air du Chant du départ
- 1840: L'Ombre de Napoléon, ou l'Arrivée de ses cendres, chant national sur l'air de la Marseillaise
- 1841: Le roi d'Yvetot, légende historique et burlesque
- 1841: Histoire populaire de tous les théâtres de Paris
- 1841: Histoire de la censure
- 1843: Pendu ou fusillé !, comedy mingled with singing, with Ernest Brisson
- 1844: Le 12 et le 13 juillet
- 1853: À Napoléon III, le tombeau de l'anarchie
- 1856: À l'enfant de France, naissance et Te Deume
