= Parvis Emad =

Iranian-American philosopher (1935–2023)

- پرویز عماد
- Born: September 4, 1935; Tehran, Iran
- Died: February 16, 2023 (aged 87)
- Spouse: Gertrude Josepha Schindler
- Children: Mitra, Mona, Eric
- Family: Mostafa Emad (father), Tahereh (Houman) Emad (mother)
- Awards: National Endowment for the Humanities (1985)

Education
- Education: University of Vienna (PhD, 1966)

Philosophical work
- School: Continental philosophy
- Institutions: DePaul University
- Main interests: Martin Heidegger

Parvis Emad (September 4, 1935 – February 16, 2023) was an Iranian-American philosopher and translator of Martin Heidegger's writings. He was the founder and co-editor of the journal Heidegger Studies. Emad was a professor emeritus at DePaul University.

== Bibliography ==
- Translation and Interpretation: Learning from Beitrage, with Frank Schalow, Zeta Books, 2012
- On the Way to Heidegger's Contributions to Philosophy, Madison, WI: The University of Wisconsin Press, 2007
- Heidegger and the Phenomenology of Values: His Critique of Intentionality, Walter Biemel (foreword), Tory Press, 1981
- Heidegger on Heraclitus: A New Reading (Studies in the History of Philosophy), Kenneth Maly (Author), Parvis Emad (Editor), Edwin Mellen Press, 1987

=== Translations ===
- Martin Heidegger, Mindfulness, co-trans. Thomas Kalary, London: Continuum Press, 2006
- Martin Heidegger, Contributions to Philosophy (From Enowning), co- trans. Kenneth Maly, Bloomington: Indiana University Press, 1999
- Martin Heidegger, Phenomenological Interpretation of Kant's Critique of Pure Reason, co- trans. Kenneth Maly, Bloomington: Indiana University Press, 1997
- Martin Heidegger, Hegel’s Phenomenology of Spirit, co-trans. K. Maly, Bloomington: Indiana University Press, 1988
