= Susan Shell =

American philosopher

Susan Meld Shell
- Born: March 24, 1948 (age 78)
- Spouse: Marc Shell
- Awards: NEH Fellowship, Bradley Foundation Fellowship, ACLS Fellowship

Education
- Education: Cornell University (A.B.), Harvard University (Ph.D.)

Philosophical work
- Era: 21st century Philosophy
- Region: Western philosophy
- School: German idealism
- Institutions: Boston College
- Main interests: political philosophy, Kantian philosophy

Susan Meld Shell (born March 24, 1948) is an American philosopher and Professor and Chair of the Department of Political Science at Boston College. She is known for her research on Kantian philosophy.

== Books ==
- Kant and the Limits of Autonomy (Harvard University Press, 2009)
- The Embodiment of Reason: Kant on Spirit, Generation and Community (University of Chicago Press, 1996)
- The Rights of Reason: A Study of Kant's Philosophy and Politics (University of Toronto Press, 1980)
- America at Risk: Threats to Liberal Self-Government in an Age of Uncertainty, edited by Susan Shell and Robert K. Faulkner (University of Michigan Press, 2009)
- Kant's 'Observations' and 'Remarks': A Critical Guide, edited by Susan Shell and Richard Velkley (Cambridge University Press, 2012).
