= Rachel Doody =

New Zealand footballer

Rachel Doody (born 11 November 1984) is a former association football player who represented New Zealand at international level.

Following her successful football career, Doody went on to join New Zealand's elite road cycling ranks in both the Women's Road Race and Time Trial.
