= Human Studies =

Academic journal

- Discipline: Humanities
- Language: English
- Edited by: Martin Endress

Publication details
- History: 1978–present
- Publisher: Springer Science+Business Media
- Frequency: Quarterly
- Impact factor: 0.582 (2017)

Standard abbreviations
- ISO 4: Hum. Stud.

Indexing
- CODEN: HUSTDT
- ISSN: 0163-8548 (print); 1572-851X (web)
- LCCN: 2004233218
- OCLC no.: 639076525

Links
- Journal homepage; Online archive

Human Studies is an international quarterly peer-reviewed academic journal of the humanities. It was established in 1978 and is published by Springer Science+Business Media.

Human Studies is dedicated primarily to take forward and enlarge the dialogue between philosophy and the human sciences. The journal addresses theoretical and empirical topics as well as philosophical investigations in different areas of the human sciences. Phenomenological perspectives and hermeneutical orientations within the social sciences, broadly defined, are the primary focus and frame for published papers. It is the official journal of the Society for Phenomenology and the Human Sciences. The editor-in-chief is Martin Endress (University of Trier). According to the Journal Citation Reports, the journal has a 2017 impact factor of 0.582.
