= Stephen A. Tyler =

American anthropologist (1932–2020)

- Born: 1932; Hartford, IA
- Died: April 2, 2020; Houston, TX
- Spouse: Martha G. Tyler
- Children: Allison Elisabeth Tyler
- Scientific career
- Fields: Anthropology, Linguistics
- Institutions: Rice University, University of California, Davis, Tulane University

Stephen A. Tyler (1932–2020) was an American anthropologist and Herbert S. Autrey Professor Emeritus of Anthropology and Linguistics at Rice University. He is known for his works on cultural anthropology.

== Life ==
Tyler was born in Hartford, Iowa in 1932.

An Air Force veteran of the Korean War, Tyler graduated from Simpson College with a bachelor's degree and Stanford University with a master's and Ph.D. He also studied the middle voice. In 1996, Tyler was interviewed by Scott A. Lukas for POMO Magazine. The article was called Beyond Alphabets: An interview with Stephen A. Tyler In this interview, he states he got the inspiration to become an anthropologist from reading Douglas Haring's 1949 textbook, Personal Character and Cultural Milieu, Gregory Bateson's 1958 book, Naven, and Ruth Benedict's 1934 book, Patterns of Culture.

Tyler was married to Martha and had a daughter named Allison.

== Employment ==
Tyler was an assistant professor of anthropology at the University of California, Davis from 1964 to 1967.

He was an associate professor at Tulane University in New Orleans, LA from 1967 to 1970.

In 1970, he became a member of the anthropology department at Rice University in Houston, TX. The department was newly formed and Tyler became the first head of the department at that time.

During his time as a professor, Tyler was also Associate Editor for American Ethnologist (1973–1976), Annual Review of Anthropology (1973–1992), Cultural Anthropology (1984–1993), and the Journal of Anthropological Research (1981–2010).

Tyler retired in 2010.

== Works ==
=== Books ===
1969 – Cognitive Anthropology. New York: Holt, Rinehart and Winston: ISBN 9780030732553

1969 – Koya: an outline grammar: Gommu dialect. Berkeley, CA: University of California Press.

1973 – India: An Anthropological Perspective. Pacific Palisades, California: Goodyear Publishing Company: ISBN 9780876200759

1978 – The Said and the Unsaid. New York: Academic Press: ISBN 9780127055503

1986 – Post-modern Anthropology: From Document of the Occult to Occult Document. Berkeley, CA: University of California Press.

1987 – The unspeakable : discourse, dialogue, and rhetoric in the postmodern world. Madison, WI: University of Wisconsin Press: ISBN 9780299112707

2011 – "Chapter 15: Emergence, Agency, and the Middle Ground of Culture: A Meditation on Mediation" in The Rhetorical Emergence of Culture by Christian Meyer and Felix Girke.

=== Articles ===
1965 – "Koya Language Morphology and Patterns of Kinship Behavior" in American Anthropologist

1966 – "Parallel/Cross: An Evaluation of Definitions" in Southwestern Journal of Anthropology

1966 – "Whose Kinship Reckoning? Comments on Buchler" in American Anthropologist

1966 – "Context and Variation in Koya Kinship Terminology" in American Anthropologist

1967 – "Social Organization" in Biennial Review of Anthropology

1968 – "Dravidian and Uralian: The Lexical Evidence" in Language (journal)

1969 – "The Myth of P: Epistemology and Formal Analysis" in American Anthropologist

1984 – "The Vision Quest in the West or What the Minds Eye Sees" in Journal of Anthropological Research

1985 – "Ethnography, intertextuality and the end of description" in The American Journal of Semiotics

1986 – "On Being out of Words" in Cultural Anthropology (journal)

1986 – "The Sorcerer's Apprentice: The Discourse of Training in Family Therapy" with Martha Tyler in Cultural Anthropology (journal)

1987 – "On writing-up/off as speaking-for" in Journal of Anthropological Research

1991 – "Presenter (Dis)play" in L'Esprit Créateur

1993 – "In other words: The other as inventio, allegory, and symbol" in Human Studies

1994 – "Mneme Critique of Cognitive Studies" in Language Sciences

1998 – "Them Others Voices Without Mirrors" in Paideuma
