= Heidegger Studies =

- Discipline: Philosophy
- Language: English, German, French
- Edited by: Parvis Emad, Friedrich-Wilhelm von Herrmann, Pascal David, Paola-Ludovika Coriando, Ingeborg Schüßler

Publication details
- History: 1985–present
- Publisher: Duncker & Humblot
- Frequency: Annually

Standard abbreviations
- ISO 4: Heidegger Stud.

Indexing
- ISSN: 0885-4580 (print); 2153-9170 (web)
- LCCN: 86-642176
- OCLC no.: 12641227

Links
- Journal homepage; Online access at Philosophy Documentation Center

Heidegger Studies is an annual peer-reviewed academic journal covering the thought of Martin Heidegger published by Duncker & Humblot. It was established in 1985 and publishes contributions in English, German, and French. The editors-in-chief are Parvis Emad, Friedrich-Wilhelm von Herrmann, Pascal David, Paola-Ludovika Coriando, and Ingeborg Schüßler. All issues are available online from the Philosophy Documentation Center.

== See also ==
- List of philosophy journals
