= Imed Trabelsi =

Tunisian businessman (born 1974)

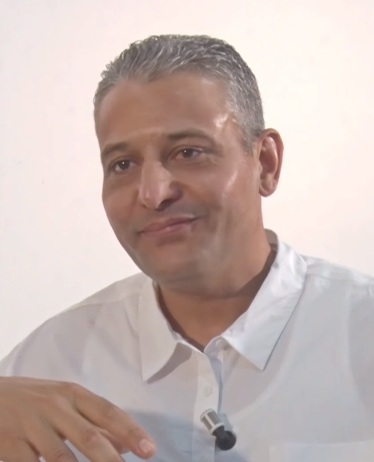
- Imed Trabelsi talks to a public audience about Tunisian Revolution, 21 May 2017
- Born: August 26, 1974 (age 51); Tunis
- Occupations: Businessman and Politician

Imed Trabelsi (Arabic: عماد الطرابلسي; born August 26, 1974) is a Tunisian businessman and politician. Trabelsi was formerly the mayor of La Goulette, Tunisia. Under Ben Ali's regime, Trabelsi controlled the construction and alcohol industry in Tunisia, in addition to operating a franchise of the French company Bricorama.

== Biography ==
Imed Tabelsi and Moaz Trabelsi (both nephews of Leïla Ben Ali), were accused of the 2006 theft of a yacht owned by the French businessman Bruno Roger, chairman of the company Lazard. Imed and Moaz were suspected after the yacht was found in Sidi Bou Said. Prosecutors brought the case to court in France, the French judge ruled the trial should take place in Tunisia. Both of the Trabelsi men were found to be innocent by a Tunisian judge. and were placed on an Interpol wanted list. The yacht was returned to its owner.

After President Zine El Abidine Ben Ali was dethroned from power and fled the country as a result of the Tunisian Revolution, Imed Trabelsi was prevented from leaving Tunisia by a pilot and was imprisoned in a "military hospital." His house in La Marsa was looted. Al Jazeera reported that Trabelsi had been killed on January 15.

Initial reports stated, that he had been killed by a mob while at the Tunisian airport, or stabbed by a fisherman in La Goulette, most reported that Trabelsi died in a military hospital after being stabbed. Later reports by the Tunisian government indicated that Trabelsi was alive and being questioned by the government. He appeared in court on April 20, 2011, for drug consumption charges and was awaiting sentencing and further prosecutions. The trial was postponed until May 7, with the judge who presided over Trabelsi's yacht theft trial being named to the case. In 2014, he began a hunger strike to protest against his placement in total isolation and the conditions of his detention, then he stayed in the hospital until his health improved. In 2015, he was sentenced to five years in prison, in a case of illegal granting of lands in Carthage. On August 18, 2023, the Court of Cassation validated the criminal reconciliation agreement concluded between Imed Trabelsi and the Truth and Dignity Authority (IVD). The Truth and Dignity Authority (IVD) was responsible for the reconciliation and compensation process on behalf of the Tunisian State between 2014 and 2018.
