= Terrence Doody =

American anthropologist (born 1943)

- Born: 1943
- Education: Cornell University (PhD)
- Awards: NEH and Mellon grants
- Scientific career
- Fields: literary critic
- Institutions: Rice University
- Thesis: (1970)

Terrence Doody (born 1943) is an American literary scholar and Professor Emeritus at Rice University. He is known for his works on the novel. He is a recipient of NEH and Mellon grants.

== Books ==
- Confession and Community in the Novel
- Among Other Things: A Description of the Novel
