= Edmond-Denis De Manne =

French playwright and journalist

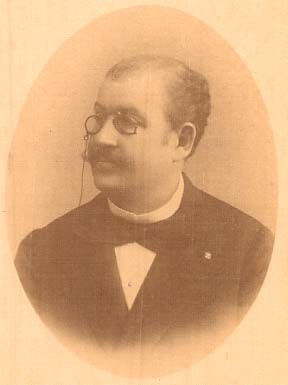
- Edmond-Denis De Manne
- Born: Jean Louis Edmond Saint-Edme De Manne; 18 August 1801; Paris, France
- Died: 6 May 1877 (aged 75); 8th arrondissement of Paris, France
- Resting place: Champ-Haut
- Occupations: playwright and journalist

Jean Louis Edmond Saint-Edme De Manne, known under the name Edmond-Denis De Manne, (18 August 1801 in Paris – 6 May 1877 in Paris) was a 19th-century French playwright and journalist.

De Manne was a member of the Société des auteurs et compositeurs dramatiques and mayor of Champ-Haut (Orne) where he is buried. In addition to his publications, he wrote numerous articles in the papers of his time. He also wrote under the pen names Armand Duplessis, Fernand de Lisle, Alexis Bartevelle, Edmond Nouel and Dupré.

== Publications ==
- 1820: Histoire d'un chien naufragé, then a pupil at royal college Henri IV
- 1821: Vers sur la naissance de SAR Mgr le duc de Bordeaux, signed Edmond de M.
- 1822: Parallèle de Talma et de Joanny
- 1822: La Peste de Barcelone, ou le dévouement des médecins français, written when the author was an employee at the King's library
- 1831: Un dimanche à Londres, ou Vive la France, comédie en vaudeville written with Tellier
- 1831: Le Mouchoir bleu, comédie en vaudeville written with M. Marguès
- 1834: Nouveau recueil d'ouvrages anonymes et pseudonymes
- 1835: Chansons, under the pen name Alexis Bartevelle;
- 1838: Une conquête !, one-act comédie en vaudeville, under his pseudonym
- 1844: À Molière, hommage de la postérité…
- 1835: Avec Mme… : Souvenirs, poésies
- 1838: Une conquête, comédie en Vaudeville
- 1842: Emery le négociant, three-act drama
- 1851: Le Château de Carrouges
- 1851: Le Désert et ses épisodes, translated from English
- 1852: Voisin de campagne, comédie en vaudeville
- 1853: Un laquais d'autrefois, one-act comédie en vaudeville, under his pseudonym
- 1864: Avant souper, comedy in 1 act in prose, under his pseudonym
- 1861: Galerie historique des portraits des comédiens de la troupe de Voltaire
- 1862: Nouveau dictionnaire des ouvrages anonymes et pseudonymes
- 1866: Galerie historique des comédiens de la troupe de Talma
- 1869: Galerie historique des comédiens de la troupe de Nicolet, available on Gallica;
- 1869: Esquisses historiques sur quelques localités de la Normandie
- 1870: Chansons
- 1876: Galerie historique de la Comédie Française
- 1877: Galerie historique des acteurs français
