= Imad Hawari =

Lebanese journalist (born 1979)

- عماد هواري
- Born: 17 May 1979 (age 47); Lebanon
- Occupations: Journalist, actor

Imad Hawari (born 17 May 1979; Arabic: عماد هواري) is a Lebanese journalist and actor. He worked for the Arabica News channel for many years. Hawari acted in 2010 in the Lebanese television series, A White Lie. He is also known as Emad al-Hawari and Imad Hawwari.

== Biography ==
Imad Hawari was born on 17 May 1979 in Beirut, Lebanon. Imad received his degree in media and journalism from Beirut University.

His career started in 1991, with acting in the film For Whom Love Sings (1991). He worked for the Arabica News channel from 2011 until 2017.

== Work ==
=== Television broadcast news ===
- Arabica News (2011–January 2017)
- Rotana Mousica (2002–2010), "Latest News"
- Radio Rotana Delta (2008), "Mazazik"
- Radio Rotana Delta (2010) "Beirut by Night"
- Lebanon TV, "Ghanili Ghaniya"

=== Radio broadcasts ===
- Radio Rotana Lebanon
- Radio Rotana Delta
- Radio El Noujoum

=== Acting ===
==== Film ====
- For Whom Love Sings (1991; Arabic: لمن يغني الحب)
- Love and Fate (1995; Arabic: الحب نصيب), directed by Hasan El-Saifi
- Women and Money (1996; Arabic: المرأة والمال), directed by Samir Al Ghussaini
- Love Under Guard (1998; Arabic: حب تحت الحراسة)
- Another Clacket (1998; Arabic: كلاكيت آخر), directed by Karim Diaa Eddin
- The Mountains When They Collapse (2002; Arabic: الجبال حين تنهار)
- And the Danger Will Pass (2001; Arabic: ويزول الخطر)
- A Day to Live and A Day to Die (2000; Arabic: يوم للحياة), directed by Mohamed El Nokaly
- Father's Secretary (2000; Arabic: سكرتيرة بابا, romanized: Secretairit Baba)
- Soraya's Eyes (Arabic: عيون ثريا), directed by Fouad Sharaf El Den

==== Television series ====
- The Storm Blows Twice (1995; Arabic: العاصفة تهب مرتين, romanized: Al A'sefa Tadreb Marratayn), directed by Milad Al Hashem
- (1995; Arabic: العصفورة), directed by Fouad Sharafeldin
- (1996; Arabic: شكتني ردينة), directed by Geneviève Atallah
- Burjuan Alley (1999; Arabic: حارة برجوان), directed by Ahmed Saqr
- Baba's Secretary (2000; Arabic: سكريتيرة بابا, romanized: Sikirtirat Baba), directed by Gaby Saad
- Tears of Justice (2000; Arabic: دموع العدالة), directed by Wesal Nehme (or Wisal Naama)
- When Mountains Collapse (2002; Arabic: الجبال حين تنهار), directed by Youssef Sharaf El-Din
- In the Presence of Absence (2008; Arabic: في حضرة الغياب) directed by Najdat Anzor
- The Other Meeting (2008; Arabic: اللقاء الآخر), directed by Milad Al Hashem
- A White Lie (2010; Arabic: كذبة بيضاء), directed by Lilliane Bustany
- Libra (Arabic: الميزان), directed by Waad Alama
- Extras (Arabic: كومبارس), directed by Gaby Saad
- Love Under Guard (Arabic: حب تحت الحراسة) directed by Mohamed El Nokaly
- O Ghali Alak Allah (Arabic: يا غافل الك الله), directed by Gaby Saad
- Heart of the City (Arabic: قلب المدينة), directed by Tarek Al Nahri
