= Journal of Anthropological Research =

- Discipline: Anthropology
- Language: English
- Edited by: Suzanne Oakdale

Publication details
- Former names: New Mexico Anthropologist, Southwestern Journal of Anthropology
- History: 1937–present
- Publisher: University of Chicago Press for the Department of Anthropology, University of New Mexico (United States)
- Frequency: Quarterly
- Impact factor: 0.647 (2016)

Standard abbreviations
- ISO 4: J. Anthropol. Res.

Indexing
- CODEN: JAPRCP
- ISSN: 0091-7710 (print); 2153-3806 (web)
- LCCN: 73645054
- OCLC no.: 14573998

Links
- Journal homepage; Online archive

The Journal of Anthropological Research is a quarterly peer-reviewed scientific journal covering anthropology. It was established in 1937 as the New Mexico Anthropologist, with its first issue published on March 13 of that year. At the beginning of 1945, Leslie Spier launched the journal's successor, the Southwestern Journal of Anthropology, and served as its editor until he died in 1961. The subsequent editor, Harry Basehart, changed the journal's title to its current one in 1973. It is published by the University of Chicago Press along with the journal's owner and copyright holder, the University of New Mexico. The current editor-in-chief is Suzanne Oakdale (University of New Mexico). According to the Journal Citation Reports, the journal has a 2016 impact factor of 0.647, ranking it 55th out of 82 journals in the category "Anthropology".
