= Gymnase-Enfantin =

Former entertainment venue

The Gymnase-Enfantin or Gymnase des Enfants was an entertainment venue formerly located near the Passage de l'Opéra (Galerie du Baromètre, leading to the Salle Le Peletier) in the 9th arrondissement of Paris. It had a capacity of 200 spectators. In 1840–1841 it was known as the Théâtre des Jeunes-Artistes and thereafter as the Théâtre des Jeunes-Comédiens.

== History ==
Inaugurated in 1829, the Gymnase-Enfantin (named in reference to the Gymnase-Dramatique) presented, as the name suggests, shows only played by children, a genre made popular in the 18th century by the Théâtre des Beaujolais. Several artists made there their debut such as Alphonsine or Clarisse Midroy.

In 1839, Auguste de Monval, dit Saint-Hilaire, became managing director. A victim of a fire 30 July 1843 and although very popular with families, the theatre definitively closed down. The troupe was then integrated into that of its rival, the Théâtre Comte. Eventually the building was rebuilt and became the Théâtre Moderne.

== Bibliography ==
- Paul Lacroix, Bibliothèque dramatique de M. de Soleinne, 1844, (p. 236-237)
- Henry Lecomte, Histoire des théâtres de Paris, H. Daragon, Paris, 1903
- Philippe Chauveau, « Théâtre Moderne », Les Théâtres parisiens disparus (1402-1986), éd. de l'Amandier, Paris, 1999 ISBN 2-907649-30-2
- Wild, Nicole ([1989]). Dictionnaire des théâtres parisiens au XIXe siècle: les théâtres et la musique. Paris: Aux Amateurs de livres. ISBN 9780828825863. ISBN 9782905053800 (paperback). View formats and editions at WorldCat.
