= Housing in Japan =

Various types of modern housing in Japan

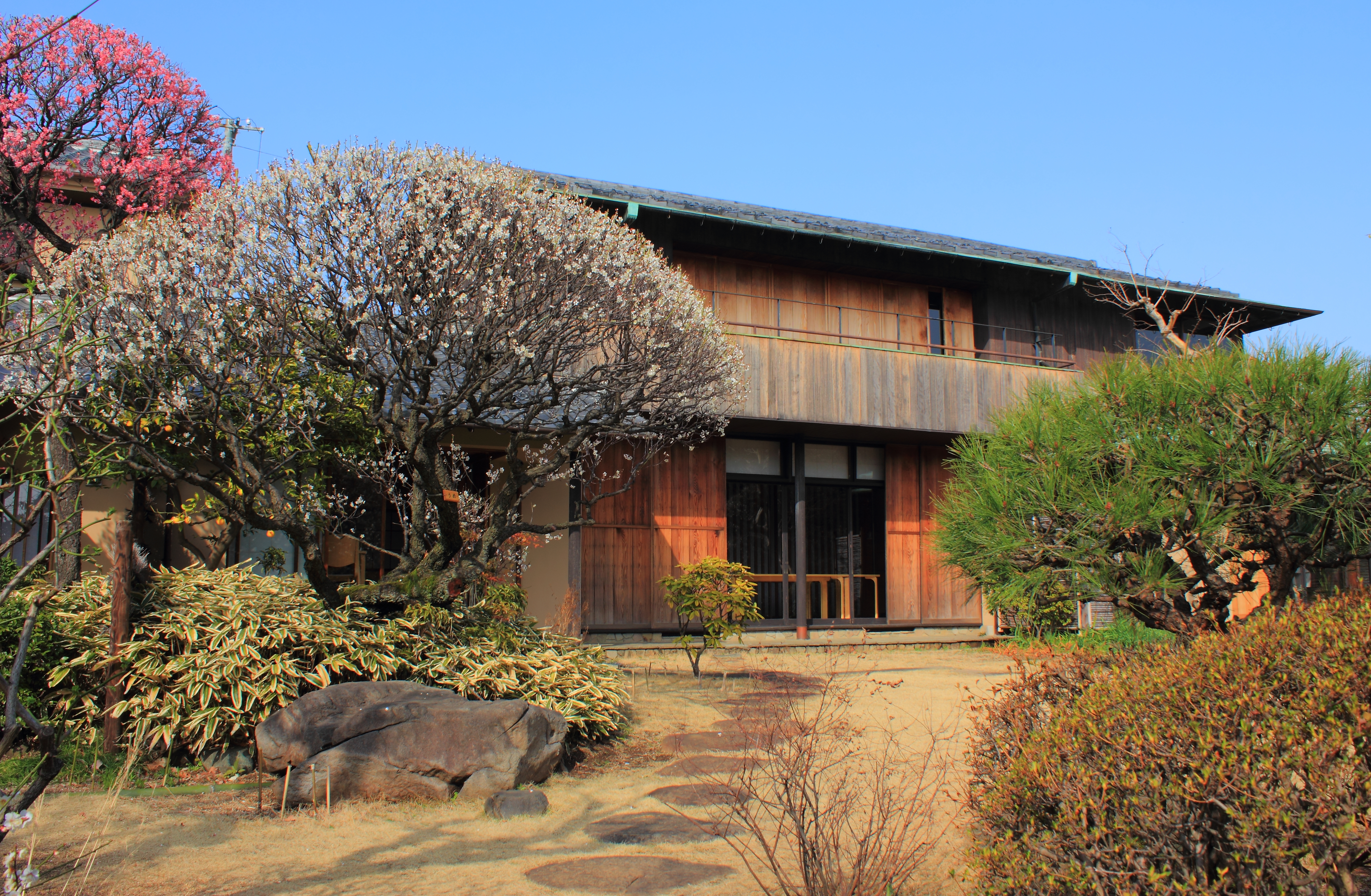
Traditional-style Sukiya-zukuri

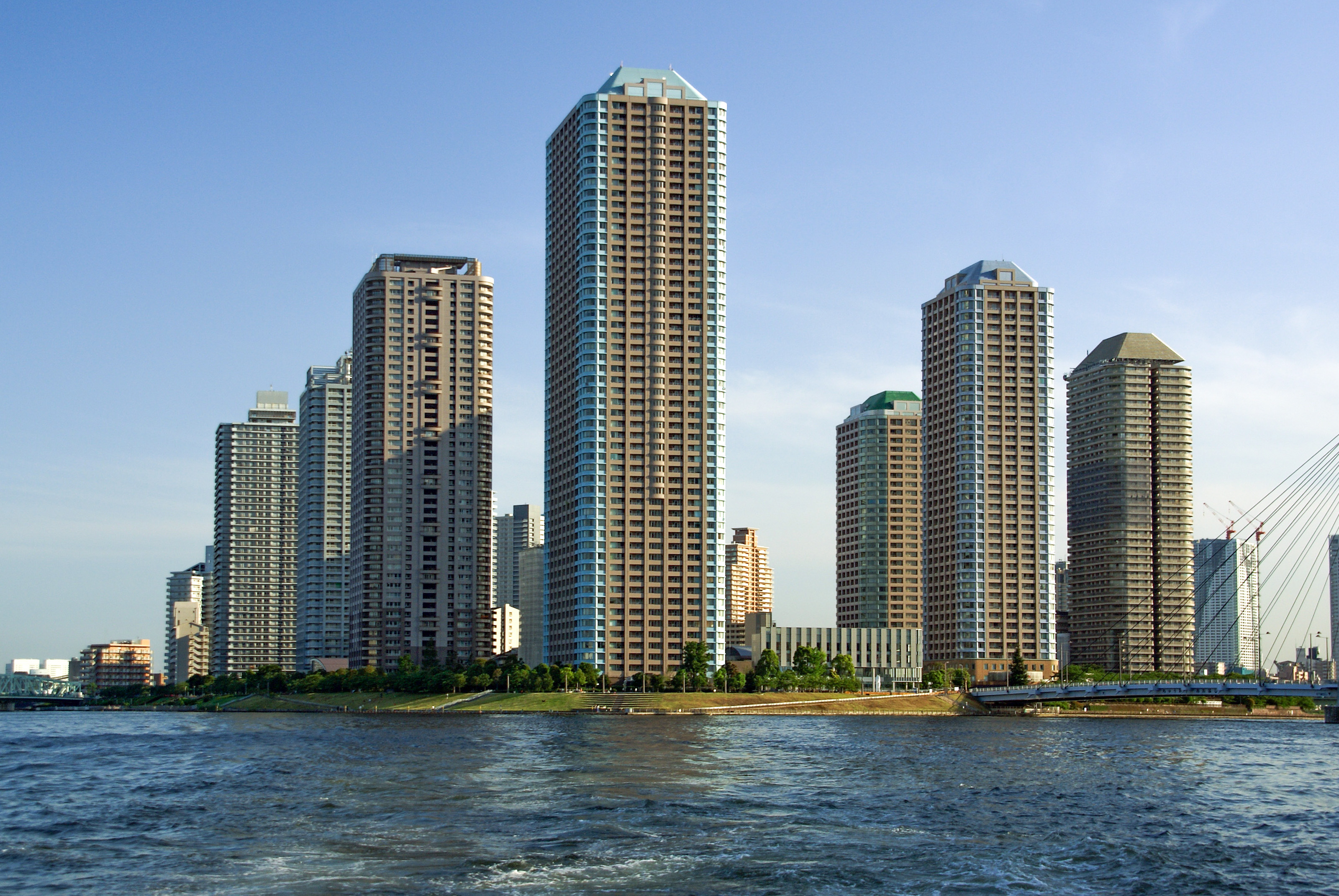
'Tower mansion' upper-middle-class condominiums in Tokyo

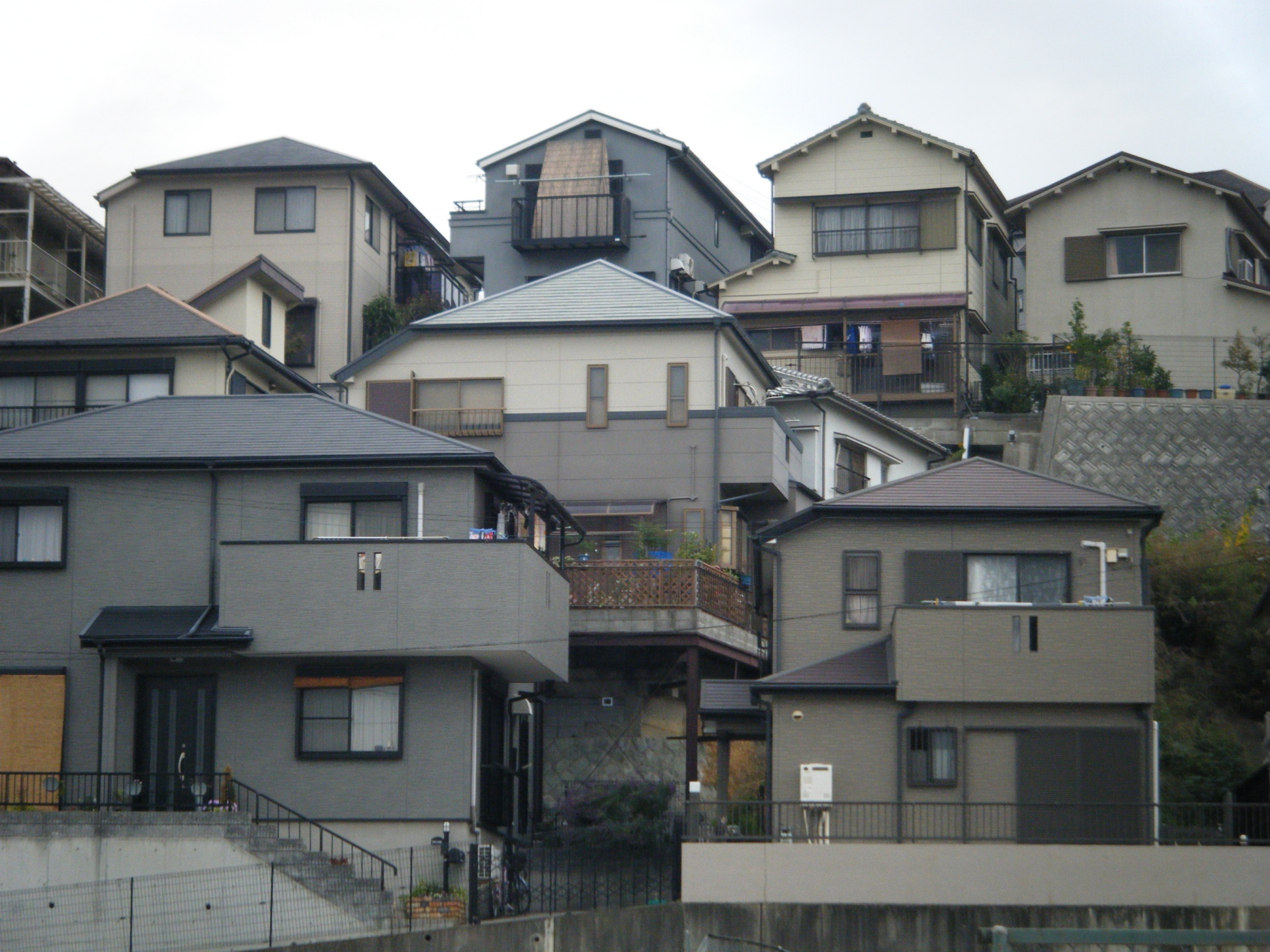
Densely built modern houses in suburban Kobe

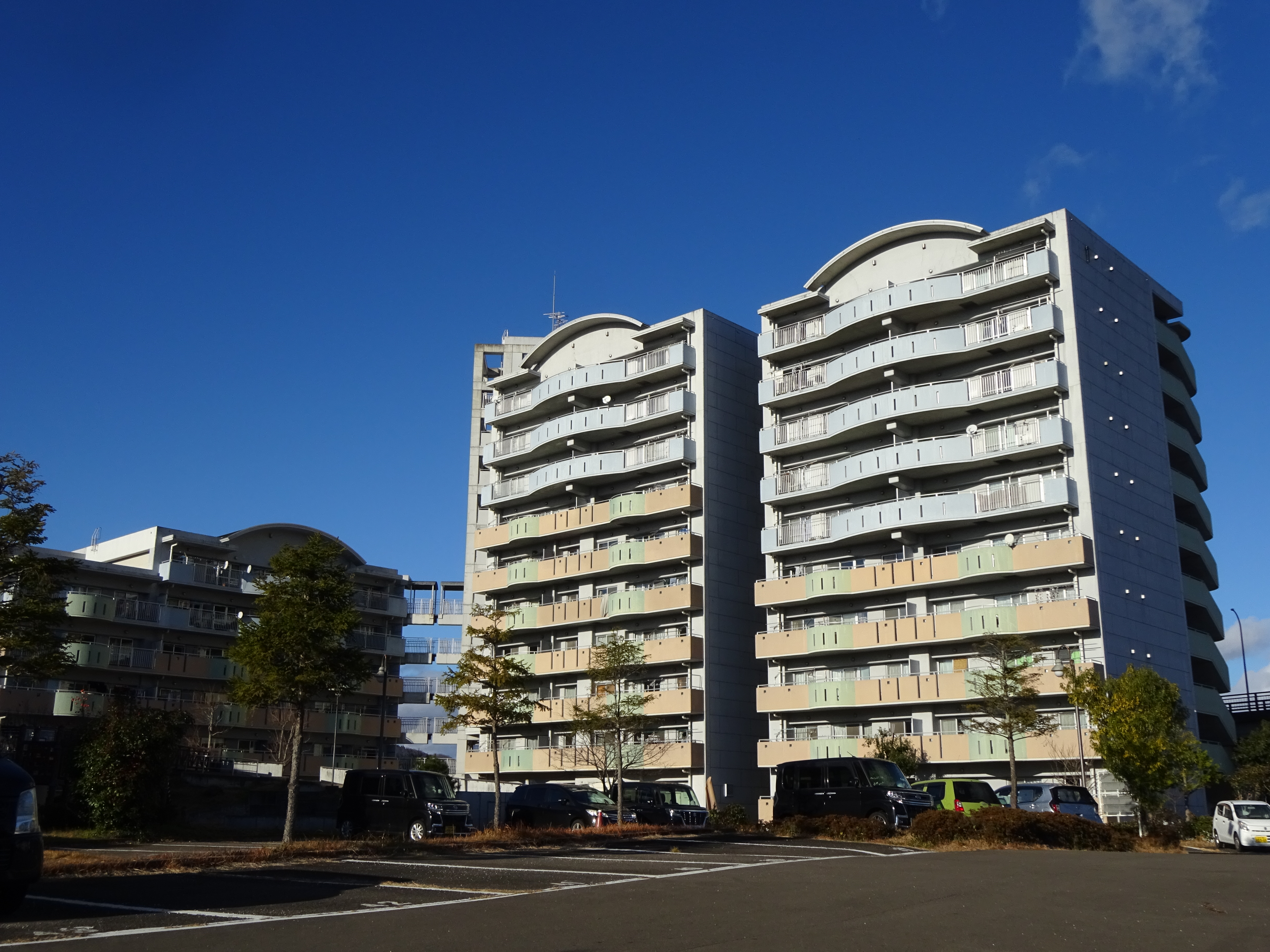
Public housing in Shibata, Miyagi

Housing in Japan includes modern and traditional styles. Two patterns of residences are predominant in contemporary Japan: the single-family detached house and the multiple-unit building, either owned by an individual or corporation and rented as apartments to tenants, or owned by occupants. Additional kinds of housing, especially for unmarried people, include boarding houses (which are popular among college students), dormitories (common in companies), and barracks (for members of the Japan Self-Defense Forces, police and some other public employees).

An unusual feature of Japanese housing is that houses are presumed to have a limited lifespan, and are often torn down and rebuilt after a few decades, generally twenty years for wooden buildings and thirty years for concrete buildings – see regulations for details. Renovating houses, rather than rebuilding them, is a relatively uncommon practice in Japan, though its prevalence is increasing, indicating that attitudes towards the use of older houses may be changing.

Japan is located in a seismically active region, and earthquake resistance is a major consideration in housing. The Building Standards Act sets minimum standards for building safety, and seismic design requirements have been strengthened over time, including a major revision in 1981. Post-disaster surveys after the 1995 Great Hanshin–Awaji Earthquake found that buildings constructed to older seismic standards generally suffered greater damage than those built to the 1981 standards. Many detached houses are wood-frame construction, in which seismic performance depends on factors such as the amount and layout of shear walls and bracing.

== Housing statistics ==
Figures from the 2012 Housing and Land Survey conducted by the Ministry of Internal Affairs and Communications indicate that Japan had 53,890,900 housing units at the time. Of these, 46,862,900 (86.9%) were occupied and 7,027,900 (13.0%) unoccupied. Of the occupied units, 28,665,900 (61.2%) were owned by the resident household. The average number of rooms per unit of housing was 4.77, the average total floor area was 94.85 square meters (28.69 tsubo; 1,021.0 sq ft) and the average number of people per room was 0.56. 45,258,000 units (96.6%) were used exclusively for living and 1,605,000 units (3.4%) were used both for living and commercial purposes. Of the units used exclusively for living, 10,893,000 (24.1%) were equipped with an automatic smoke detector. As of 2003, 17,180,000 housing units (36.7%) are classified by the Japan Ministry of Internal Affairs and Communication as being located in urban areas while 27,553,000 housing units (58.8%) are located in rural areas.

As in America, most Japanese live in single-family housing. During the postwar period, the number of multi-unit dwellings in Japan increased rapidly. In 1990, for instance, 60% of Japanese dwellings consisted of single-family homes, compared with 77% in 1958. Two years earlier, in 1988, 62.3% of the total housing units in Japan were single-family units and 37.7% were multiple-unit dwellings. That same year, a survey carried out by the Japanese economic planning agency showed that 62.3 per cent of the Japanese population owned a detached two-storeyed house.

In the 1980s, a new home in Japan cost 5-8 times the annual income of the average Japanese, and 2-3 times that of an average American. The typical loan term for Japanese homes was 20 years, with a 35% down payment, while in the United States it was 30 years and 25%, due to differing practices in their financial markets.

In 1973, according to one study, 65% of the population of Japan lived in detached houses, while 12% lived in attached houses and 23% in a flat or apartment. A survey conducted by the Management and Coordination Agency in 1983 found that there were 34.75 million occupied dwellings in Japan, of which 46.1% were built of timber, 31.3% of fireproof timber, and 22.6% of ferroconcrete or other nontimber materials. The same survey found that detached housing accounted for 64.3% off all housing in Japan, with the ratio falling in urban areas. In the 23 wards of Tokyo, for instance, multi-unit structures such as apartment houses accounted for 62.5% of all housing in those wards. In terms of tenure, 62.4% of housing in Japan consisted of owner-occupied dwellings, 24.3% of units leased by the private sector, 7.6% of units leased by the public sector, and 5.2% of housing for government workers and company employees.

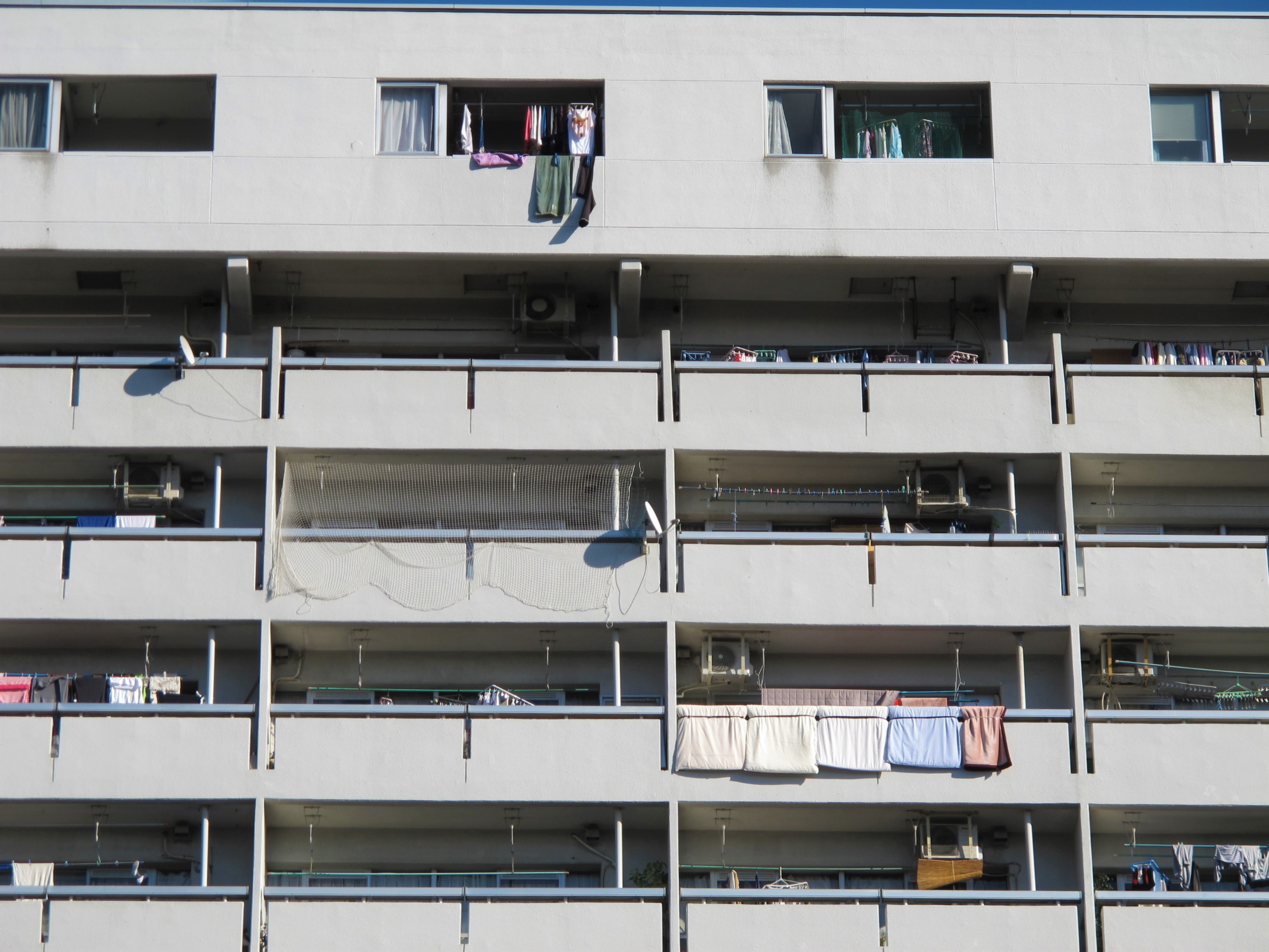
Balconies of a typical apartment building in Sapporo

According to a housing survey carried out in 1993, single-family homes accounted for 59.2% of all housing in Japan. In 1997, it was estimated that about 60% of Japanese lived in detached houses. In 1998, 52% of all dwellings in Japan were found to consist of detached houses owned by their residents, 36% were rented dwellings in apartment complexes, 8% were owned dwellings in apartments complexes, and 4% were rented detached houses. In 2005, 27,533,066 households (57.2% of private households) owned a detached house, while 19,014,478 households (39.5%) lived in apartment houses or flats. In 2008, it was estimated that six out of ten Japanese lived in single-family houses.

According to a survey conducted by the Ministry of Internal Affairs and Communications in 2008, around 7.56 million houses were empty. It was later estimated in 2019 that approximately 13.6% of buildings in Japan were vacant, referred to in Japanese as Akiya (Japanese: 空き家, lit. 'empty house'). Some of the properties are also referred to as jiko bukken (Japanese: 事故物件, lit. 'black property'), and are difficult for realtors to sell or let due to being associated with traumatic events such as murder, suicide, fatal accidents or certain undesirable locations. To combat this, schemes have been put in place by the Ministry of Land, Infrastructure, Transport and Tourism (MLIT) to promote the renovation and reoccupation of Akiya property, with estate agents maintaining special listings referred to as 'Akiya Bank' to facilitate the sales, renovation and renting of such property. While local Akiya Bank schemes have been in place since the 1990s, renewed interest in renovating property, as well as the advent of the internet, meant that a national scheme was put in place in the 2010s, which remains active to date. A 2024 survey by the Internal Affairs Ministry found that the number of Akiya properties amounted to 9 million homes, with around 13.8% of homes in Japan vacant.

== Danchi ==
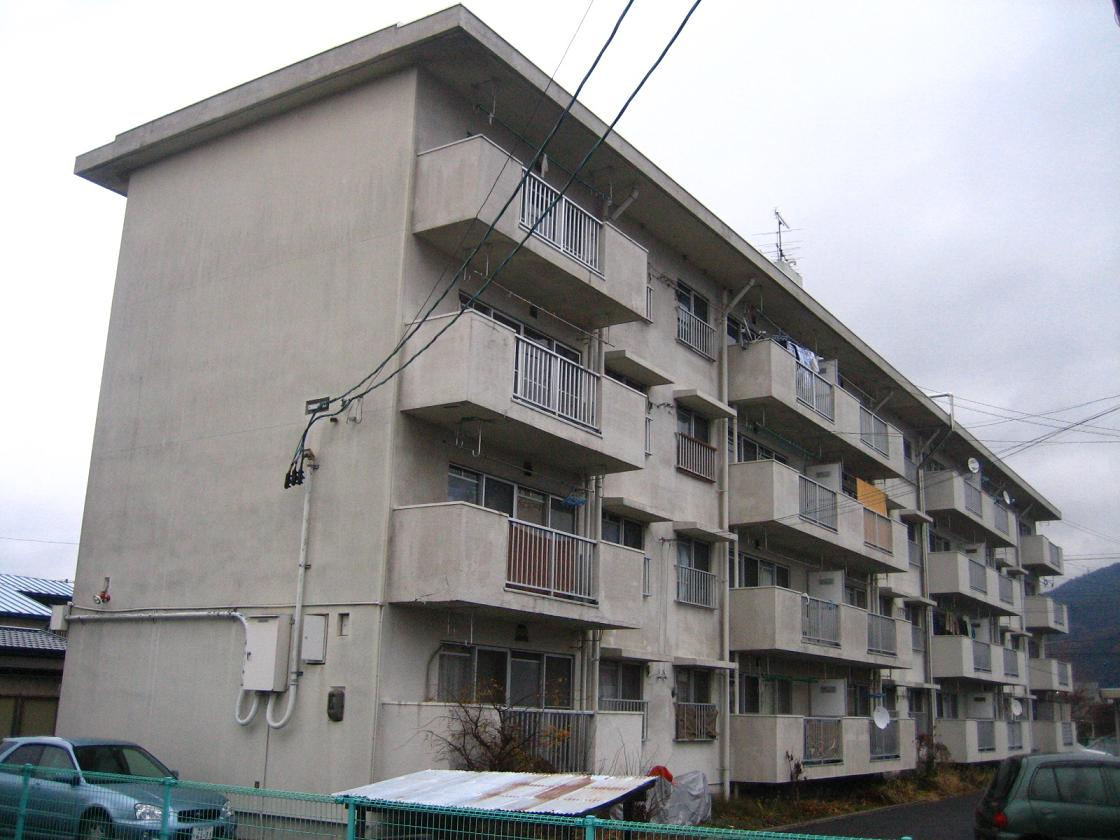
A danchi in Aizuwakamatsu, Fukushima built in the Shōwa period

Danchi (団地, lit. "group land") is the Japanese word for a large cluster of apartment buildings of a particular style and design, typically built as public housing by a government authority.

The Japan Housing Corporation (JHC), now known as the Urban Renaissance Agency (UR), was founded in 1955. During the 1950s, 60s, and 70s, the JHC built many danchi in suburban areas to offset the housing demand of the then-increasing Japanese population.

== Interior design ==
=== Traditional homes ===
Kusakabe House, built in 1879, Takayama

A traditional Japanese house does not have a designated use for each room aside from the entrance area (genkan, 玄関), kitchen, bathroom, and toilet. Any room can be a living room, dining room, study, or bedroom. This is possible because all the necessary furniture is portable, being stored in oshiire, a small section of the house (large closets) used for storage. In Japan, living room is expressed as ima, living "space". This is because the size of a room can be changed by altering the partitioning. Large traditional houses often have only one ima (living room/space) under the roof, while kitchen, bathroom, and toilet are attached on the side of the house as extensions.

Somewhat similar to modern offices, partitions within traditional Japanese houses are created by a variety of movable panels. One of the most common types is fusuma, sliding doors made from wood and paper, which are portable and easily removed. Fusuma seal each partition from top to bottom so it can create a mini room within the house. On the edge of a house are rōka, wooden floored passages, that are similar to hallways. Rōka and ima are partitioned by shōji, sliding and portable doors that are also made from paper and wood. Unlike fusuma, paper used for shōji is very thin so outside light can pass through into the house. This was before glass began to be used for sliding doors. Rōka and outside of the house are either partitioned by walls or portable wooden boards that are used to seal the house at night. Extended roofs protect the rōka from getting wet when it rains, except during typhoon season where the house gets sealed completely. Roofs of traditional houses in Japan are made of wood and clay, with tiles or thatched areas on top.

For large gatherings, these partitions are removed to create one large meeting room. During a normal day, partitions can create much smaller and more manageable living spaces. Therefore, kitchen, bathroom, toilet, and genkan with one multipurpose living space create one complete Japanese housing unit. However, the bathroom, toilet, and even kitchen can be communal. (See Sentō.) Therefore, the minimum Japanese housing arrangement, which is still possible to find if one is looking for the cheapest room to rent, consists of just genkan and one living room/space.

=== Modern homes ===
Housing is typically listed in real estate advertisements in the format of a number of rooms plus letter designators indicating the presence of common room areas, for example: 1R or 2LDK. R designating room, L for living room, D for dining room, and K for kitchen. In this format, the bathroom and toilet are not mentioned but are included with the exception of some very small 1R or 1Ks. L, D and K are not really separate and are part of or next to the kitchen. An LDK is bigger than a DK. The number before the letters indicates the number of additional multipurpose rooms. Often the rooms are separated by removable sliding doors, fusuma, so large single rooms can be created.

Additionally, advertisements quote the sizes of the rooms—most importantly, the living room—with measurements in tatami mats (jō (畳) in Japanese), traditional mats woven from rice straw that are standard sizes: 176 by 88 cm (69 by 35 in) in the Tokyo region and 191 cm by 95.5 cm in western Japan. "2DK; one six-tatami Japanese-style room, one six-tatami Western-style room" is an example.

In Japan, multiple-unit blocks are referred to as one of two types:

- Apaato (アパート） (or Apartment) for rented unit buildings, which are usually only a few stories in height, without a central secure entrance.
- Mansion (マンション) usually purchased type expensive buildings (but recently some have been rented due to large vacancies) with multiple floors, elevators, and a communal secure gate, with centralized postboxes; they are usually more sturdily built than apaato, normally of reinforced concrete (RC) construction.

Though commonly accepted standards for description exist, this is not a legal requirement; therefore, descriptions may not be entirely accurate.

=== Genkan ===
One characteristic of a Japanese home is the genkan, or entryway. It includes a small area, at the same level as the outside, where arriving people remove their shoes. As they take off their shoes, people step up onto a raised floor. They point the tips of their shoes to the outside. The rest of the residence is at the raised level of this floor. Adjacent to the lower floor is a shelf or cabinet called a getabako (geta box) in which people will place their shoes. Slippers for indoor use are usually placed there.

=== Kitchen ===
The modern Japanese kitchen features appliances such as a stove, a narrow fish grill (broiler), and an electric refrigerator. The stovetop may be built-in or may be a self-contained unit on a counter-top, and it is usually gas-burning, although recently induction heating (IH) stovetops have become popular. Common units of all types of stoves include two to four burners. Broilers designed for cooking fish are usually part of the stove and are located below, and unlike many Western-style grills, are not full width. Built-in ovens large enough to bake or roast are uncommon; in their place, table-top multifunction convection microwaves are used. Most kitchens have electric exhaust fans. Furnishings commonly include microwave ovens, hot water boilers, and electric toaster ovens. Built-in dishwashers are rare, although some kitchens may have small dishwashers or dishdryers. The kitchen includes running water, typically with hot and cold faucets/taps.

=== Bathroom ===
Japanese housing typically has multiple rooms for what in Western housing is the bathroom. Separate rooms for the Japanese toilet, sink, and ofuro (bathing room) are common. Small apartments, however, frequently contain a tiny single bathroom called a unit bath that contains all three fixtures. A small sink may also be built into the top of the toilet tank – there is a tap, with the top of the tank forming the sink, and the water draining into the tank – which runs during the flush cycle; this is particularly common in mid-20th century buildings. The room with the sink, which is called a clothes changing room, usually includes a space for a clothes-washing machine. The room containing the bathtub is waterproof with a space for washing, and often for showering, adjacent to (rather than in) the tub. As a result, bathwater is neither soapy nor dirty, and can be reused. Many washing machines in Japan come with an extension pipe to draw water from the tub for the wash.

Hot water usually comes from a gas or kerosene heater. The heater is usually located outdoors (at least in warm climates). Its gas supply may be from a municipal utility or from LP (Liquid Petroleum) tanks on site. The typical Japanese water heater is tankless and heats water on demand. One heater may supply both bath and kitchen. However, many homes have two or more heaters. Recently, electric water heaters have been introduced for home owners. These electric heaters heat the water in a tank overnight when electricity is cheapest, for use the following day.

=== Laundry ===
Modern homes in Japan will have a small washing machine, but most will not have a clothes dryer as most Japanese hang clothes out to dry on the balcony or in the bathroom, if it is heated. Laundromats are found throughout Japan. Many small apartments do not have room to place a washing machine or dryer. Likewise, only a small percentage of homes with washing machines have dryers. As such, during the rainy season or on rainy days, many people take their clothes to the laundromat to wash and dry them.

=== Washitsu ===
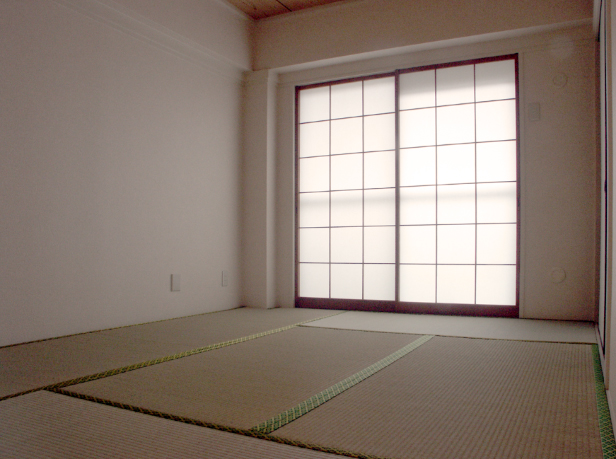
A tatami room with shoji

Many homes include at least one traditional Japanese styled room, or washitsu. It features tatami flooring, shoji rather than draperies covering the window, fusuma (opaque sliding vertical partitions) separating it from the other rooms, an oshiire (closet) with two levels (for storing futons), and a wooden ceiling. It might be unfurnished, and function as a family room during the day and a bedroom at night. Many washitsu have sliding glass doors opening onto a deck or balcony.

Other bedrooms, as well as living rooms, dining rooms, and kitchens, are in a Western style. They usually have modern synthetic floor coverings. Ceilings are typically also synthetic, and might be white or beige. Windows usually open by sliding laterally, although many kitchen windows open by tilting, with the bottom slanting outwards.

=== One-room mansion ===
A one-room mansion (wan rūmu manshon ワンルームマンション) is a Japanese apartment style in which there is only one small room (10 m^{2} or 3.0 tsubo or 110 sq ft in many cases) and usually a compact bathroom. It is the functional equivalent of the Western-style studio apartment. These units are most often rented by single individuals due to their extremely small size; it is difficult for more than one person to reside in them. Most of Japan's city apartment blocks have rooms such as these although family units (around 60 to 90 m^{2} or 18 to 27 tsubo or 650 to 970 sq ft in size) are more common, especially in the suburbs.

== Utilities ==
=== Heating ===
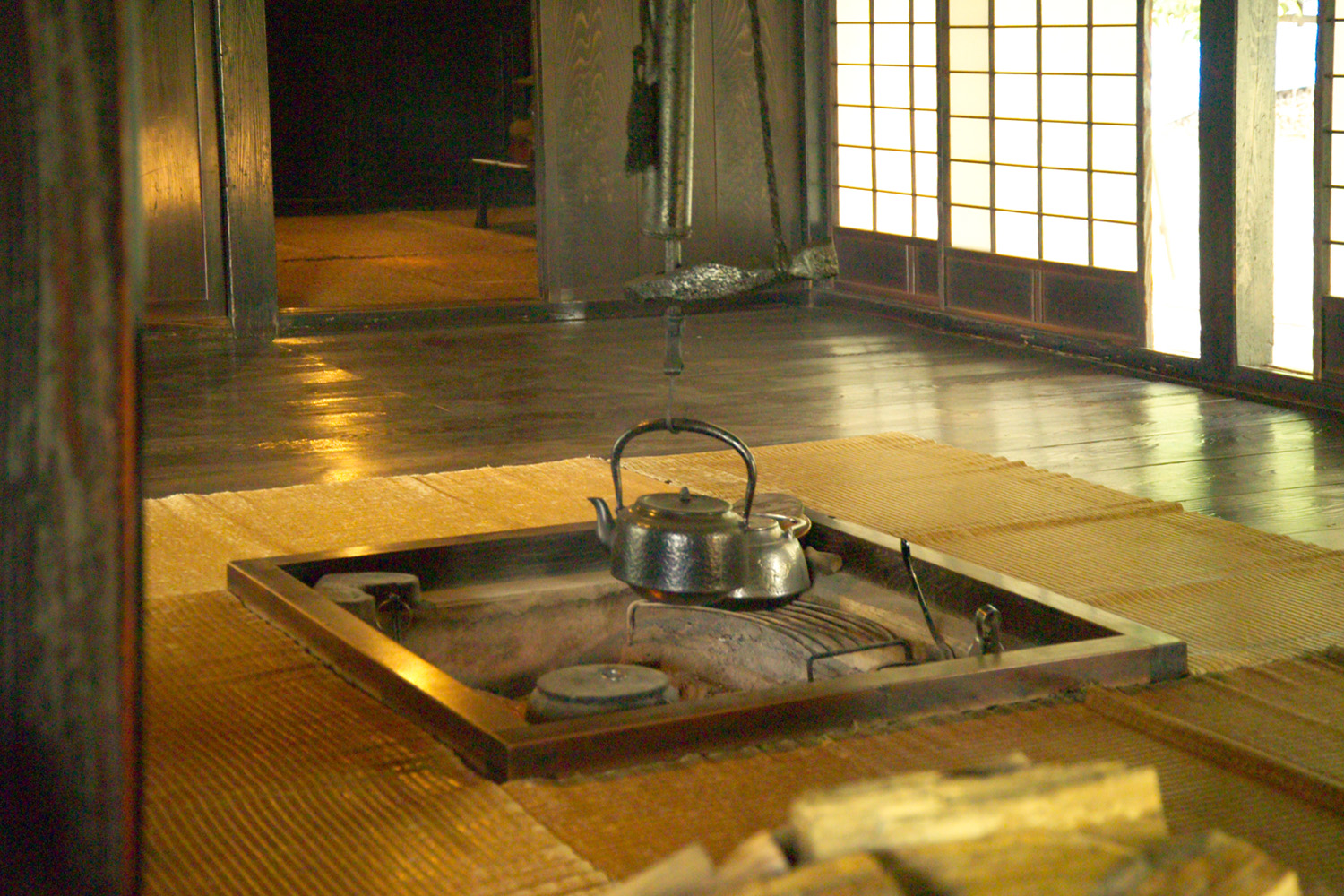
Hearth in a traditional Japanese house in Honshū

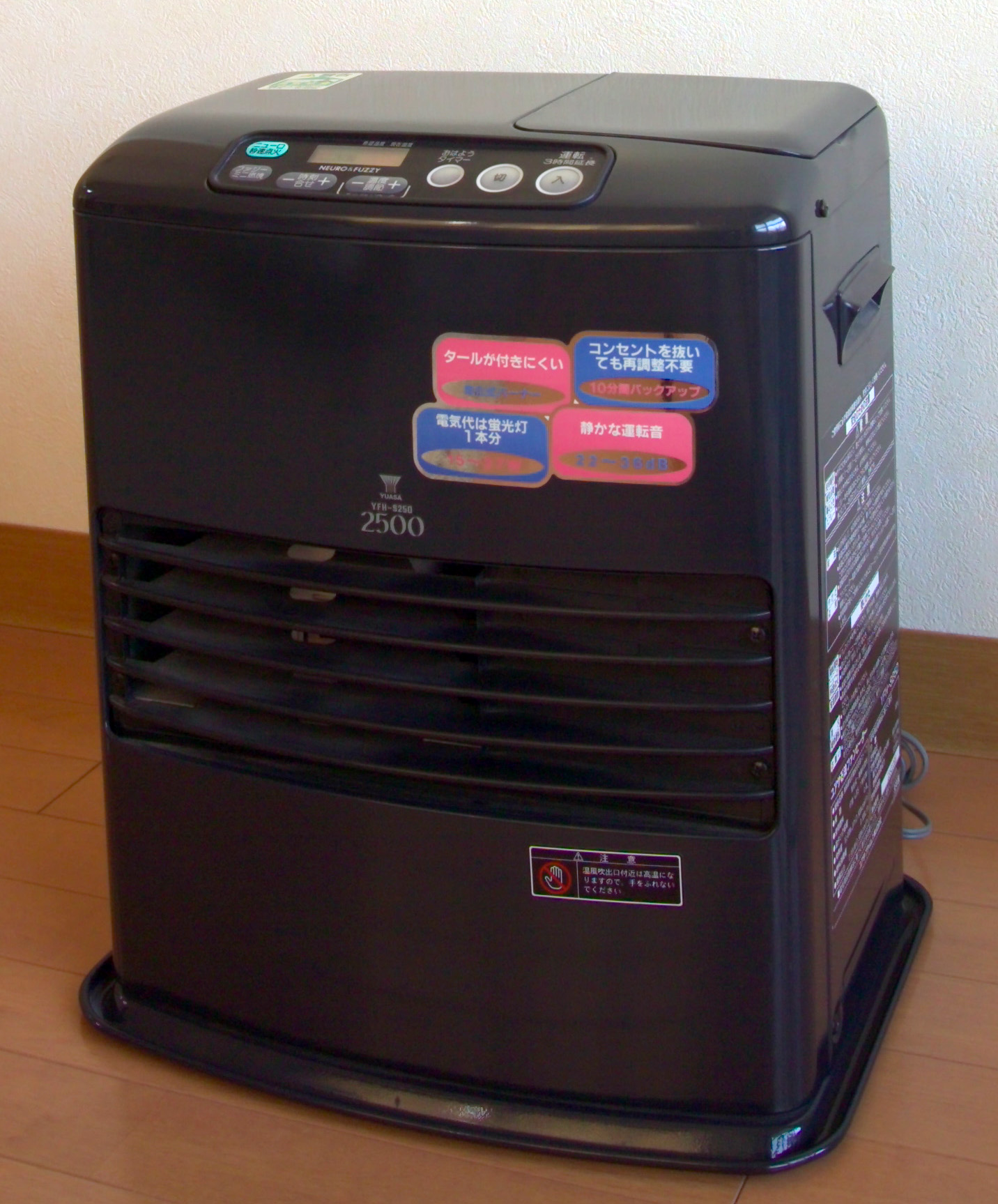
A modern kerosene space heater

Space heating rather than central heating is normal in Japanese homes. Kerosene, gas, and electric units are common. Apartments are often rented without heating or cooling equipment but with empty duct space run, allowing the installation of heat pump units. Occupants purchase appliances and take them when they move.

Traditional Japanese buildings do not use insulation, and insulation may even be omitted in modern construction, especially in the low-end apartments; nor is insulated glazing traditionally used in windows, with these being generally single-pane. This is not the case in Hokkaido and the northern part of Honshū, due to the cold winters there. Insulated and centrally heated homes in the northern part of Japan are warmer than many homes in warmer parts of Japan and often use double-pane glass. This is not the case for the newer buildings as they are insulated and built with insulated glazing.

The simplest kerosene burner has a tank for fuel, a mantle, and a control dial. Battery-operated electric ignition is a popular step up. The next rank has an electric fan to circulate hot air through the room. Many such units feature computer control of temperature. The computer can also turn them on and off on schedule. Gas heaters are popular, and many homes have gas outlets in rooms to accommodate portable units. Windows in many homes have vents to open to protect the occupants from excessive exhaust gas. Kerosene and gas units have safety features to turn off the fire and cut off the fuel supply when the heater receives a shake, whether from an accident or earthquake. These units usually shut off automatically after two or three hours to prevent carbon monoxide fumes from building up while the resident is sleeping.

Another type of kerosene heater functions similar to a radiator and consists of two parts. Kerosene fuel is stored in a tank and burned outside the home, and the flame heats a fluid that is circulated into the second unit inside the house. In this unit, fans blow across the tubes carrying the heated fluid, and the room is warmed as a result. This type of heater is popular since it reduces the fumes significantly and virtually eliminates the risk of carbon monoxide poisoning as well as the chance of a small child or pet accidentally injuring themselves.

Electric heat is typically delivered through heat pump units mounted on the ceilings or the walls, such as above the doors to the deck or balcony, rather than through baseboards. These heaters often do double duty as air-conditioners and are accordingly called eakon (エアコン). Thermostatic control and timers are available in most lines. The manufacturers of electric and electronic appliances produce these heaters.

In northern Japan, underfloor heating yukadanbō (床暖房) (lit. 'floor heater') is common, a type of radiating heater beneath the floor, where heated fluids are circulated to provide warmth. Underfloor heating is found in houses or condominiums in the warmer parts of Japan but not for apartments. The cost is expensive, so sometimes this type of heater is only installed in limited areas such as living rooms or a "clothes changing room". Electric carpets have become popular in recent years.

Toilet seats are frequently warmed by electric heat.

Finally, a traditional type of heater known as a kotatsu is still widely used today. The kotatsu can come in multiple forms, but the more common is as an electric heating element attached to the underside of a low table: The table is typically surrounded by a light duvet-like cloth to keep the heat in. This type of table is common in the washitsu.

=== Electricity ===
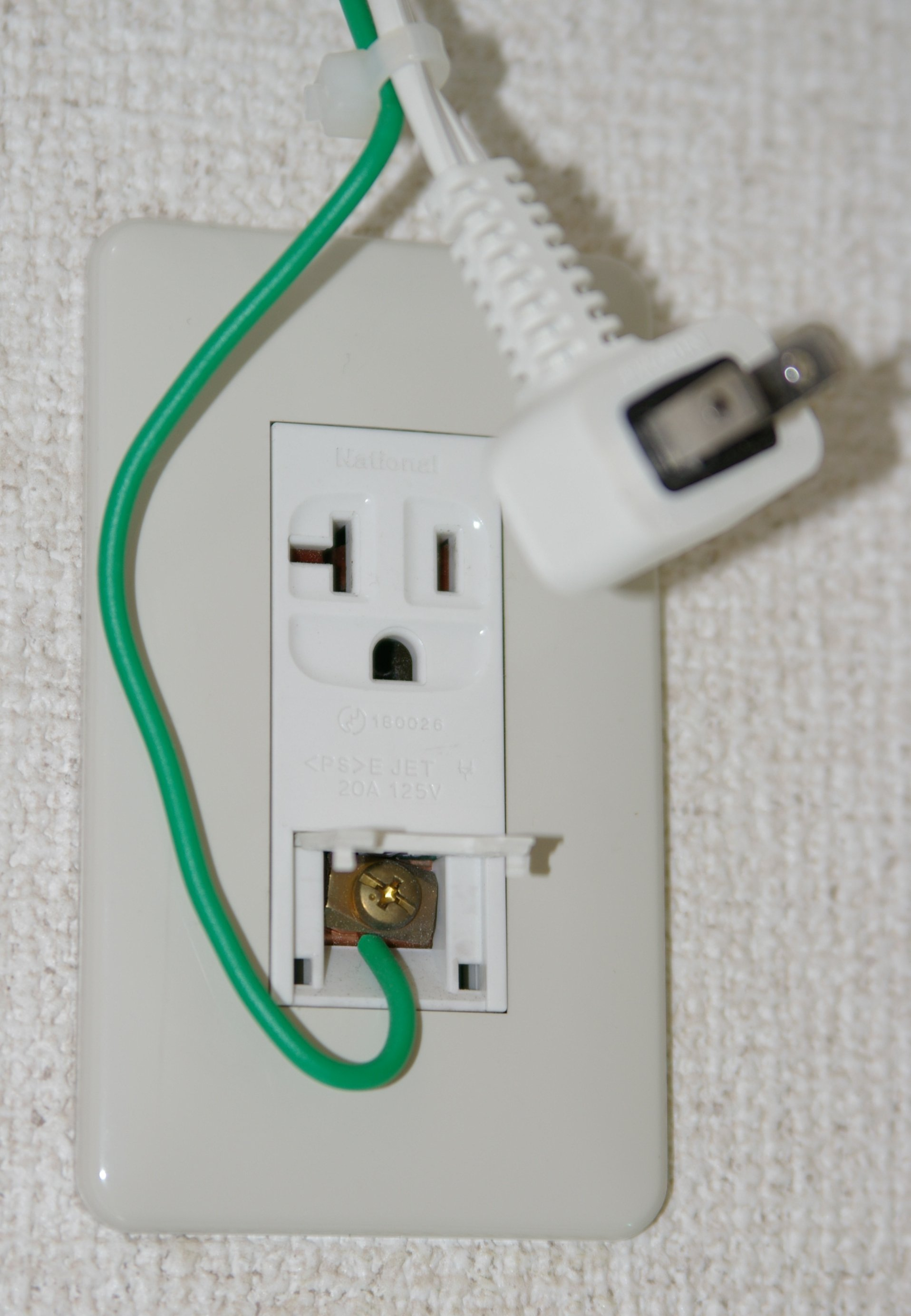
This outlet has a terminal for grounding an air conditioning unit.

Most Japanese dwellings are connected to the nation's power grid using a 3-wire system with standard phase-neutral voltage of 100 V. 100 V AC outlets are located throughout the home for general use. A few 200 V outlets may also exist for connecting appliances such as an induction heating stove or large air conditioner. The line frequency is 50 Hz in eastern Japan, and 60 Hz in the western part of the country. Circuit breakers of 30 to 60 amperes are typical for most electrical distribution boards.

Many domestic appliances operate properly at either frequency (auto-sensing). Outlets resemble those formerly used in the North America (see comparison), with two vertical slots. The older outlets are un-polarized and many sockets lack proper grounding. Outlets in the kitchen, toilet, and bathroom, as well as those supplied by the ceiling for air-conditioning units do usually have a third grounding terminal, either in the form of a 3-pin outlet or a covered bonding screw. Devices designed for use with water, such as clothes washers and heated toilet seats, often have a separate earth wire or earth ground pin. Cheater plug adapters are readily available to convert such 3-pin plugs and so allow their use in all types of 2-pin sockets.

Since 2005, new Japanese homes are required to have 3-pin earthed outlets for connecting domestic appliances. This rule does not apply for the outlets not intended to be used for domestic appliances, but it is strongly advised to have 3-pin outlets throughout the home.

100 V polarized outlet (JIS C 8303; 15 A 125 V)

3-pin grounded outlet (JIS C 8303 15 A 125 V)

3-pin high amperage outlet, typically used for air conditioners (JIS C 8303; 20 A 125 V)

200 V grounded outlet, typically used for stoves and larger air conditioners (JIS C 8303; 20 A 250 V)

=== Lighting ===
Lighting equipment, like heaters, is normally the provenance of the occupant. Many homes do not include built-in ceiling lights in the living, dining, and bedrooms. Instead, they have ceiling receptacles that provide both electrical connection and mechanical support for lighting equipment. There are four common types of ceiling connectors and these will generally also support the weight of the light fitting. Kitchens, bathrooms, corridors and genkan are likely to have built-in ceiling fixtures.

Lighting is generally by fluorescent lamps and LED lamps, and most frequently in living areas features a 4-way switch. The lamp has two separate circular fluorescent tubes, together with a nightlight (formally 常夜灯, informally a ナツメ球, natsume-kyū, "jujube-bulb" (so-named for the shape)), and the switch cycles between "both bulbs on", "only one bulb on", "night light only" and "off". Replaceable glow starters (formally 点灯管, informally グロー球 gurō-kyū "glow bulb") are common in older fixtures.

== Automobiles ==
Outside of the downtown areas of large cities, many Japanese people park their cars at or near their homes. Some single-family houses have built-in garages; others have carports or unsheltered spaces on the grounds. Apartment and condominium buildings frequently have parking lots, some occupying (for example) the first floor (i.e. at ground level) of the building, others outdoors. Elevator parking allows double use of limited space: one car parks below ground level, with an elevator raising it when needed; the other parks at ground level. More elaborate elevator arrangements are also in use. Residents also lease parking spaces at vacant lots in the neighborhood, generally on a monthly basis, called tsukigime chūsha (月極駐車; monthly parking).

== Construction ==
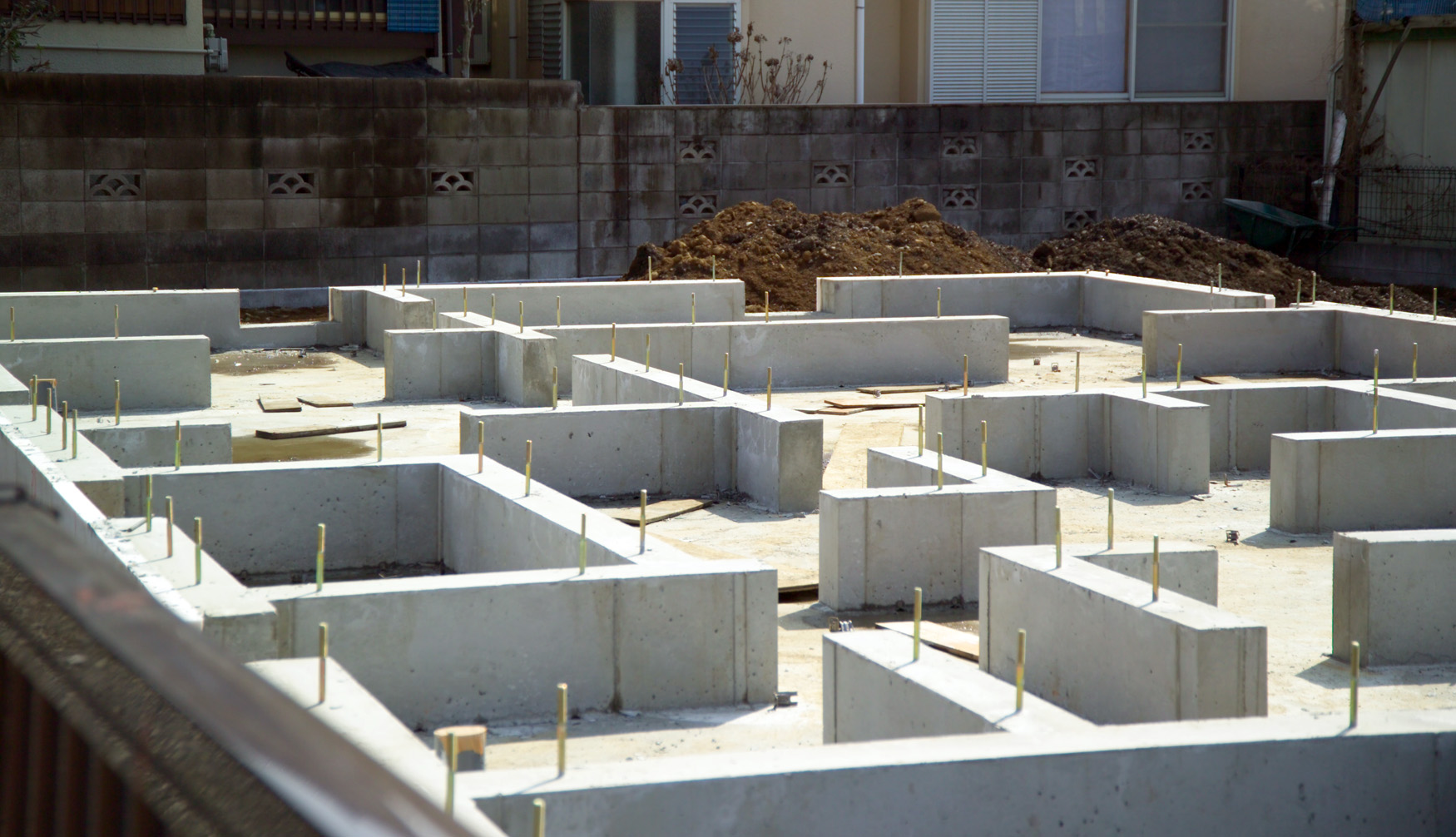
Foundation for a new house

Many single-family residences are constructed by nationwide manufacturers such as Matsushita (under the name PanaHome), Misawa Home, Mitsui, and Sumitomo Forestry. Some such companies maintain parks with model homes to show to prospective buyers. The builders of a condominium may open a unit to show prospective buyers; alternatively, they may construct a separate model room elsewhere. Makers of appliances similarly operate showrooms to display their products.

=== Construction materials ===
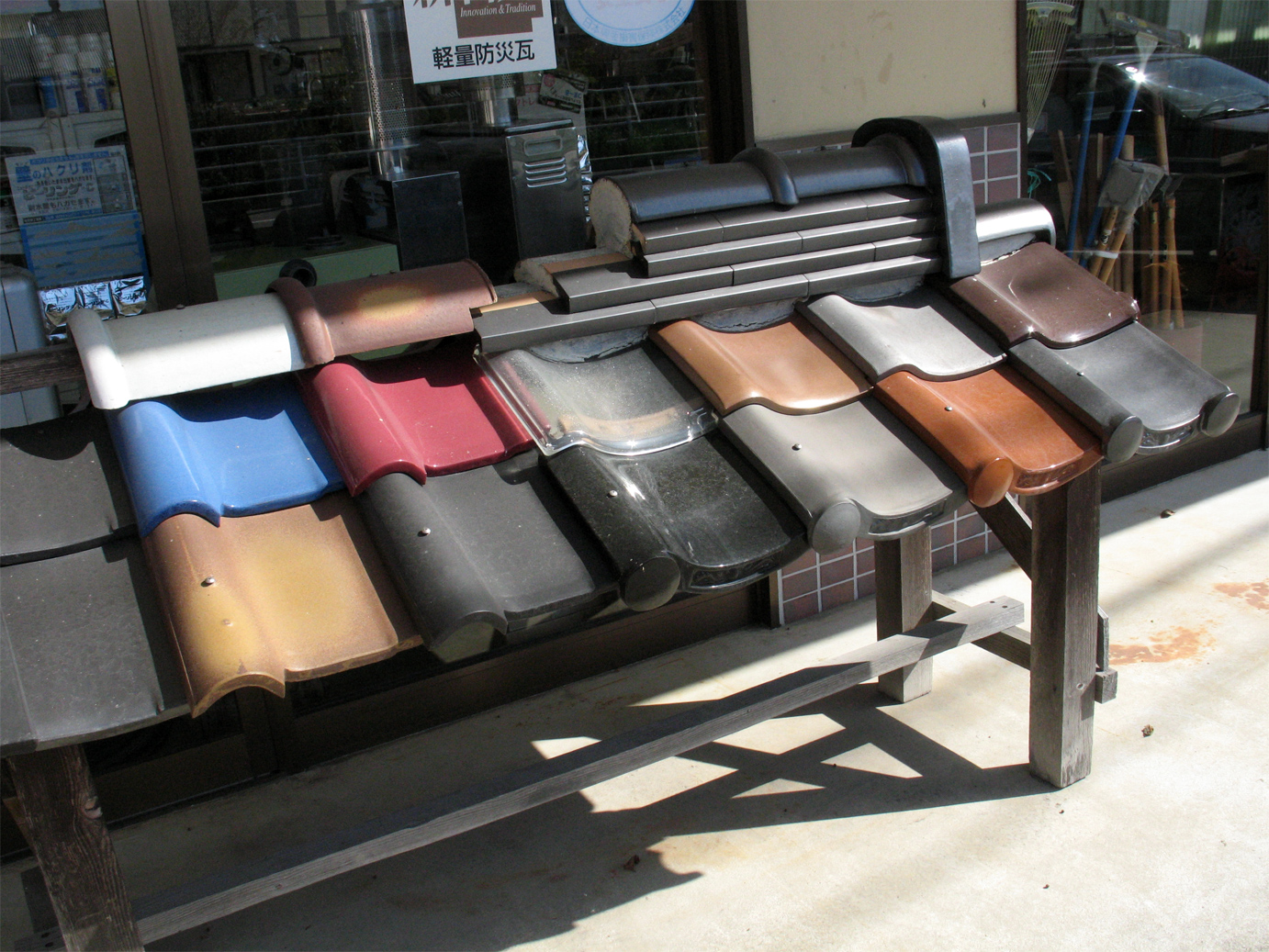
A retail display shows a variety of ceramic roofing tile styles.

For freestanding houses, wood frames are popular. Two-by-four construction is an alternative to the native style. Houses may be clad in siding or faced with ceramic tile. Interiors often have drywall, painted or with a wall covering. Tile is a common roofing material; it may be fired clay or concrete. Clay tiles often bear a color and a glaze.

Large buildings are typically constructed of reinforced concrete. Roofs coverings include asphalt and synthetics.

=== Housing regulations ===
The usual maximum allowed height of a wooden building in Japan is two stories; however, using some new technology, some three story wooden buildings are currently allowed (if they meet the building codes). Some wooden houses may have lofts, but these may not be used as bedrooms, only for storage space. Steel and concrete buildings may have more stories, but usually they only have two. Basements are uncommon in private homes but common in high-rise buildings.

The footage which can be built-upon is regulated according to a system involving two figures: building coverage ratio (建蔽率, kenpeiritsu) and floor area ratio (容積率, yōsekiritsu). Building coverage ratio is the ratio of the building footprint compared to the total area of the land. These two figures are often listed in advertisements for plots of land such as 70:400 (where 70 means the building coverage ratio is 70% and 400 is the floor area ratio or 400%). This would mean that a 4-story home could be built using 70% of the land. Thus, for a maximum allowable coverage ratio of 50%, the greatest building footprint allowed for a lot of 100m^{2} would be 50m^{2}. Floor area ratio is the total floor area of the house (excluding the roof and basement) as compared to the area of land the house is built upon; for a maximum FAR of 150%, the greatest possible total floor area for a house built on a 100m^{2} lot would be 150m^{2}. Both maximum values vary according to the location of the land and width of facing roadway, with more built-up areas with wider roads generally allowing greater maximum floorspace, and building coverage dictated by factors such as frontage, nearby roads, and construction materials. Additionally, the number of floors in a structure may be restricted, in order to avoid excessive blockage of light to neighboring properties.

The taxable value of a house is controlled by its building material. In Japan’s resale market, a common rule of thumb is that the value of a typical wooden detached house is treated as largely depreciated after about 20 years; for property taxation, the assessed value of buildings is reduced over time using age-based depreciation rates set in national valuation standards. Many real estate agents and appraisers use similar age-based depreciation rules of thumb as a rough guide when estimating a home’s building value. Although there are still some wooden homes almost 100 years old with thatched roofs and concrete buildings well over the 30 year depreciation price, taxing is based upon the above method.

=== Earthquake-proof construction ===
Japanese architects have developed technology that would reduce the damage of earthquakes, a natural disaster that occurs frequently in Japan. To reduce the shaking of buildings, architects would isolate the foundation of buildings from the ground. Construction workers would often install flexible pads under buildings to support them when an earthquake happens, or create a space under the foundation so it is not directly connected to the ground. This is also a reason Japanese houses use wood frames, since wood is a material that reduces earthquake shake.

== Living patterns ==
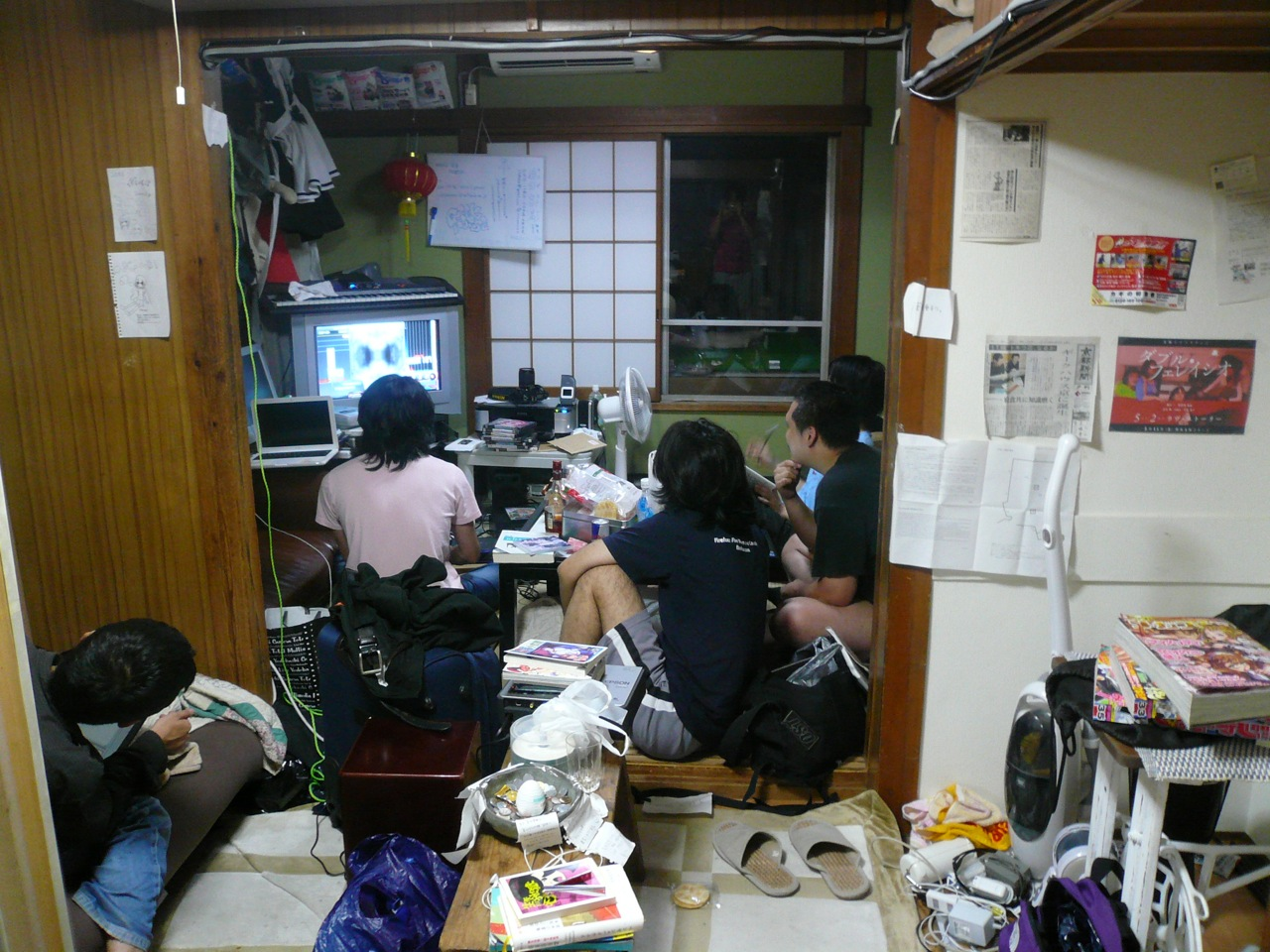
A shared house, 2010

Many young Japanese adults choose to live with their parents, rather than seeking a separate residence, a phenomenon known as parasite singles (パラサイトシングル). A 1998 survey by the Ministry of Health and Welfare indicated that about 60% of single Japanese men and 80% of single women between the ages of 20 and 34 lived with their parents.

After marriage, the young couple often live in the same house as their parents. A desire for some separation between the generations has led to the phenomenon of nisedaijūtaku (二世代住宅), literally "two generation housing", a single house which contains two complete separate living areas, one for the parents and one for the younger generation.

Conversely, in large metropolitan areas of Japan, it is no longer uncommon for young couples to co-habit in an apartment before they marry.

Traditionally, the elderly also continue to live with their children rather than being put into homes for the elderly. The responsibility for the parent usually falls onto the oldest male child or atotsugi (跡継ぎ). The number of elderly people living at home has led to a great demand for care products for home use, and also the so-called "barrier-free" housing, which contains fewer steps and obstacles for the elderly.

Apartment sharing between strangers is rare in Japan, most single people preferring to live in small sized individual apartments. However, in recent years, as Japan is undergoing demographic and socioeconomic change, it is becoming more common for young people to share apartments. Apartment designs are many and varied. An older pattern for single occupancy is a long thin, shoe-box shaped apartment, with a kitchen area and bathroom located often near the genkan and a living space/bedroom at the opposite end where a small balcony may be located.

Japanese companies and organizations often send their male employees to various locations throughout Japan. It is not always possible or desirable for the entire family unit to move near the employee's new job site. In this case, small apartments are rented by married men who then travel to the family home either every weekend, once every two weeks or once a month depending on the distance and the company policy.

== Home ownership ==
Because of the high cost of housing in major Japanese cities, many urban families and individuals rent apartments rather than owning their own home. In 2003, less than half of the living units in Tokyo were owned by the resident. On the other hand, rural areas tend to have much higher ownership rates. The highest rate in the country is Toyama Prefecture, with around 80% of all living units being owned by the resident.

The living space of houses and condominiums is larger than apartments. The average size of an owned residence in Japan is 121.7 m^{2} (36.8 tsubo; 1,310 sq ft). This varies wildly between major urban areas (Tokyo: 91.0 m^{2} or 27.5 tsubo or 980 sq ft) and rural areas (Toyama Prefecture: 178.4 m^{2} or 54.0 tsubo or 1,920 sq ft). The area of homes that are advertised for sale or rental is commonly listed in the Japanese unit tsubo (坪), which is approximately the area of two tatami mats (3.3 m^{2} or 36 sq ft). On diagrams of the house, individual room sizes are usually measured in tatami, as described above in the interior design section.

In recent years, condos and mansions have become more and more popular. Compared to 1983, when 64% of owned homes were single-family dwellings, and only 27% were condos, more recent statistics show that the latter make up around 40% of the category now.

As houses age, owners replace them. A common pattern is to rebuild on the same site. To accomplish this, the occupants move to a temporary residence. A contractor demolishes the old structure and builds a new one on the grounds. The residents can then return to the location. Not having moved, they enjoy the convenience of keeping the same address, telephone number, and utility accounts, as well as avoid the cost of purchasing new land. Because of the wooden construction and relatively short lifespan of Japanese houses, this is often considered cheaper than maintaining the old structure. As residential building regulations change, particularly in terms of setback requirements and coverage ratios, rebuilding on the same site can potentially result in a house significantly smaller than the original. To get around this, homeowners will sometimes demolish all but the minimum required by law to qualify as a "renovation" rather than a "rebuilding". This has been the source of some debate.

=== Foreign ownership ===
Japan does not impose legal restrictions on foreigners renting or buying property, and foreign nationals can acquire ownership in the same way as Japanese buyers, subject to standard transaction practices and documentation requirements. By contrast, some jurisdictions restrict foreign ownership of certain residential property types. For example, in Singapore, foreign persons generally require prior approval to purchase restricted residential property (including landed houses) under the Residential Property Act.

Non-resident buyers and owners may face additional administrative steps. For example, non-residents who acquire real property in Japan (or related rights) must submit a post-acquisition report via the Bank of Japan within 20 days after acquisition. In addition, reforms effective 1 April 2024 introduced “domestic contact information matters” for ownership registration applications: if the new registered owner has no address in Japan, the registration filing must include a domestic contact in Japan (name and address of one person/entity), or indicate that no domestic contact exists. Separately, some municipalities require non-resident property owners to appoint a tax agent (納税管理人) to receive tax documents and handle tax payments on the owner’s behalf.

== Home and apartment rental ==
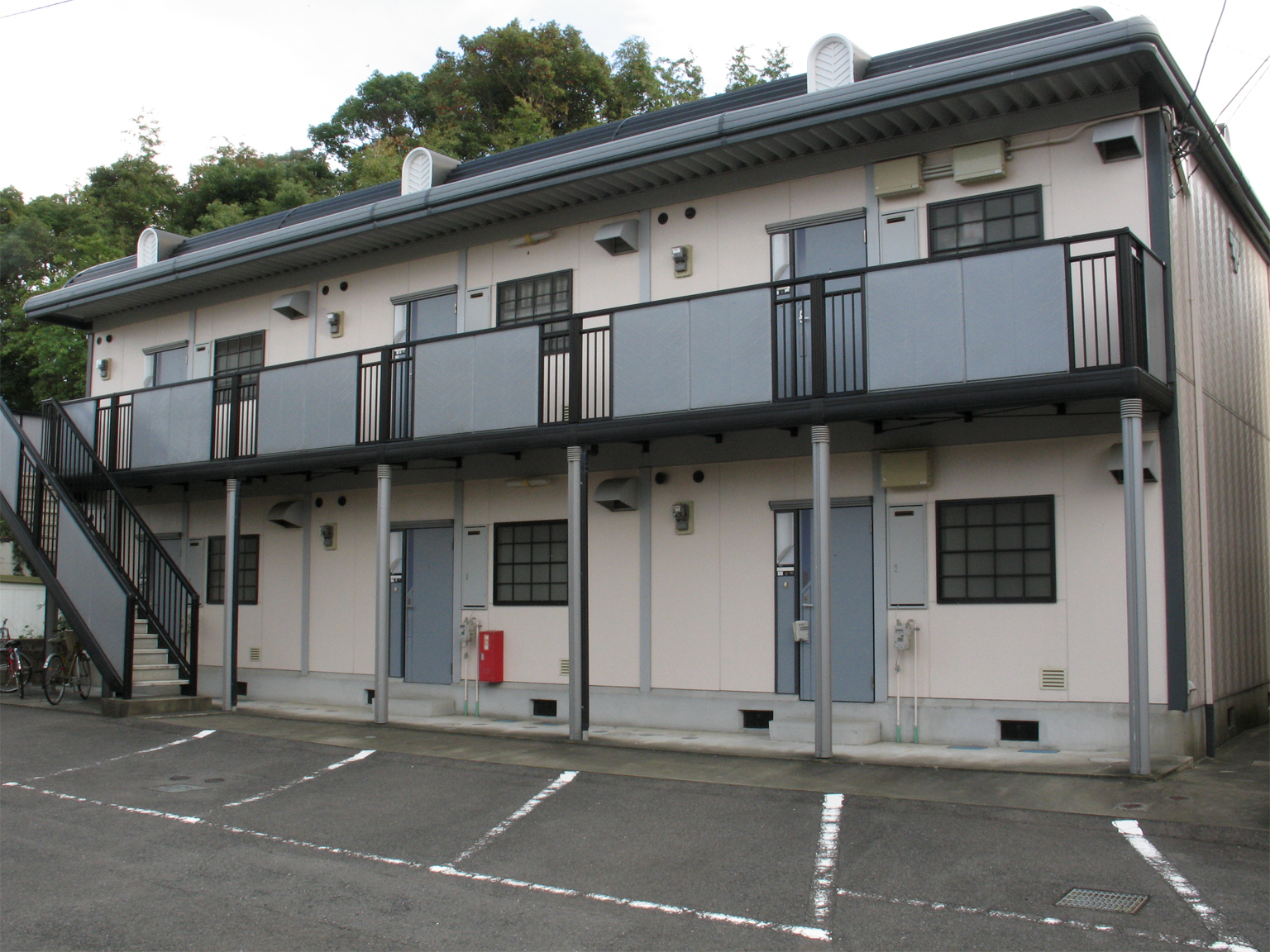
A two-story Japanese rental apartment building in Karatsu, Saga

To rent an apartment in Japan, would-be tenants visit real estate agents located in every neighborhood and browse through copies of apartments for rent. These usually have the layout of the apartment for rent and the costs to rent this apartment. If a would-be tenant is interested in a particular apartment, the agent contacts the landlord to see if the apartment is still available and whether a visit could be arranged. Typically, a renter cannot rent an apartment on her or his own, but is required to have a guarantor who promises to pay the rent if problems arise.

Traditionally, Japanese landlords collect both a damage deposit and "key money" before the renter takes occupancy, and the real estate agent is also paid a month's rent for services provided. Key money is a non-refundable payment to the landlord. In major cities like Tokyo and Osaka, key money is often a major expense in itself: up to six months' rent in many cases. In recent years many landlords have begun demanding smaller amounts of key money, equal to two or three months' rent or none at all. An industry of no-deposit apartments, called monthly mansion and weekly mansion, has also sprouted up in major cities: these generally charge higher rents than traditional leases, and may offer some hotel-style amenities such as linen service.

In Tokyo, a typical rental agreement is for two years for an ordinary tenancy agreement. At the end of the contract period, this agreement is re-negotiated, and the renter typically pays an additional month's rent as a fee. In many other cities, however, the two-year agreement is regarded simply as a minimum length of stay, and the rent does not normally change over the years. However, as buildings get older and more repairs are required, or as government tax rates go up, a rent increase does occasionally occur.

=== Guest houses ===
Foreigners in Japan renting apartments on their own often face discrimination from real estate agents or landlords who refuse to rent to foreigners. Some agents will explain to foreigners directly that it is difficult to rent to them. Finding a guarantor is also difficult for many foreigners. Living in a Guest House is one way to circumvent these problems. Sometimes referred to as "Gaijin Houses" (meaning foreign persons' house), Guest Houses come in a variety of shapes and sizes. They are designed to provide short-term accommodation at reasonable prices with a minimum of hassle. Usually aimed at foreign visitors, they are becoming increasingly popular with young Japanese seeking to break with the tradition of living with parents until, and sometimes after, marriage. While deposits are payable, in most cases they tend to be low and key money is not charged for these properties. A guest house will provide one room for sleeping, a shared kitchen and shared bathroom. Facilities like washing machines are usually coin-operated, but due to intense competition many landlords are seeking to provide as many free utilities as they can; free Internet is currently very common in Tokyo. Typically, foreigners and Japanese are finding it harder to find Guest Houses and have been opting for small "apaato"s instead.

== Company housing ==
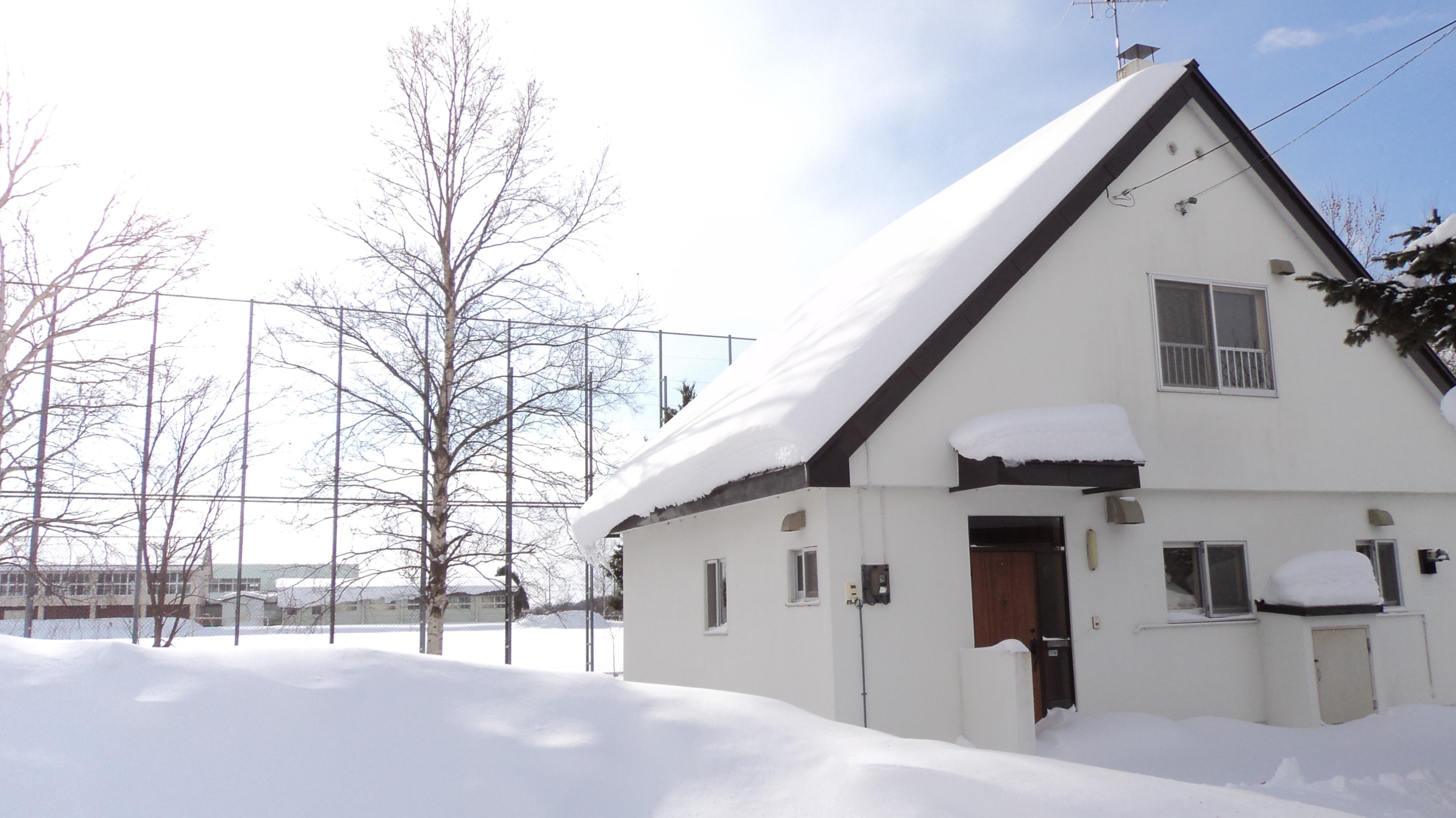
Company housing for teachers at the Yuni Junior High School (background) in Hokkaido

Many Japanese companies also maintain their own apartment buildings (called shataku) where young employees live when they first start working. Sometimes, the shataku is located near the company's office building. In other cases, the company may not own its own apartment complex, but hold an exclusive lease over one or more independent apartment buildings. In 2003, there were nearly 1.5 million shataku units in Japan.

Depending on the company policy, some shataku are one-room and only available to single people while other companies offer larger multi-room complexes available to married couples as well. Likewise, there may or may not be a maximum duration which you can lease the shataku, but that too is up to company policy. Some offer the room until the employee marries, others will only offer it for the first 3, 4, 5 or more years of employment. It varies from company to company.

== Traditional housing ==
A model of traditional house in Kyoto

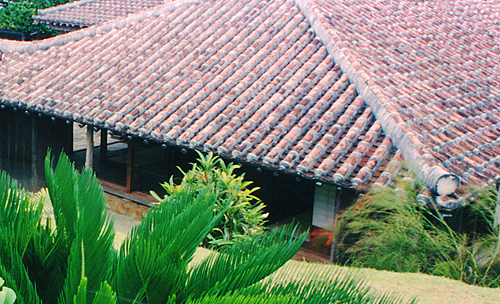
A traditional house in Okinawa Prefecture has the red tile roof characteristic of the region.

Historically, commoners typically lived either in free-standing houses, now known as minka, or, predominantly in cities, in machiya (町屋) or row-houses called nagaya (長屋). Examples are still visible in Kyoto. Additional dwelling patterns included the samurai residence, the homes of wealthy farmers (such as the village headmen), and the residences of Buddhist temples.

Wood was the material of choice for structures, while roofs could be thatch, cypress bark, tile, or bare wood. Raised floors were of wood, and might be covered with straw mats in places. Kitchens usually had dirt floors.

== Homelessness ==
The Ministry of Health, Labour and Welfare reported in 2003 that Japan had 25,296 homeless people. Osaka, Tokyo, and Aichi were the prefectures with the highest homeless populations, while the city of Osaka, the 23 special wards of Tokyo, and the city of Nagoya had 1750 or more (no other city had 850). The ministry found that about 41% lived in urban parks and 23% along river banks; streets and railway stations also had significant numbers.

== Gallery ==
Danchi

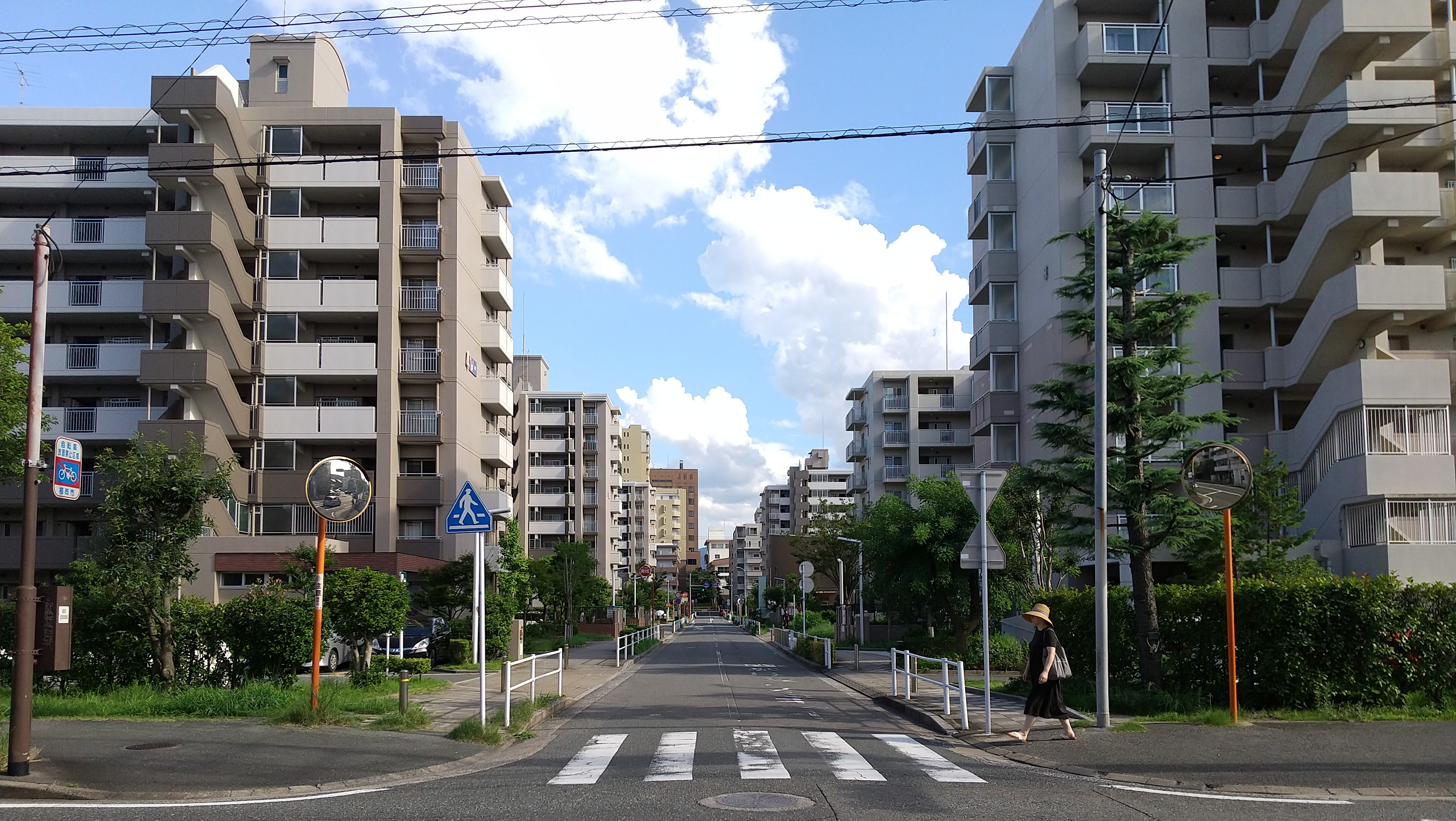

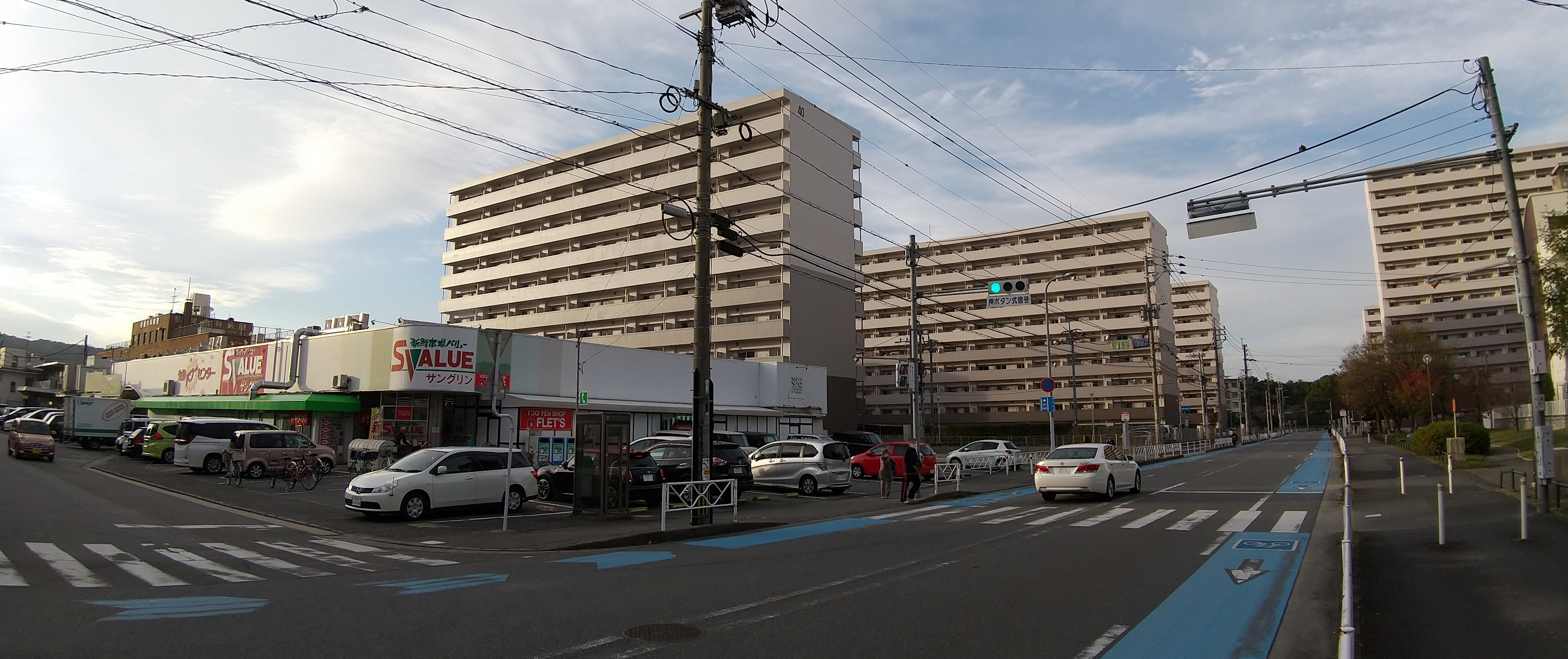

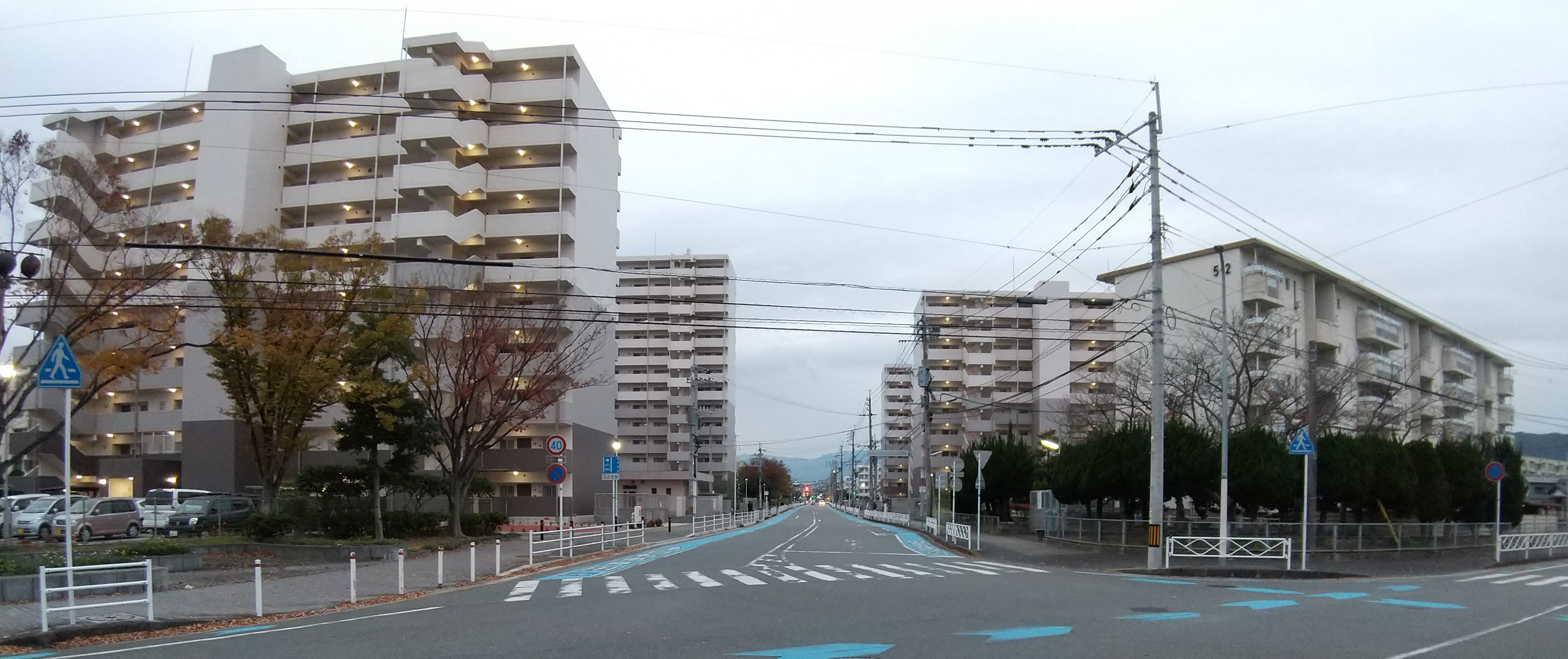

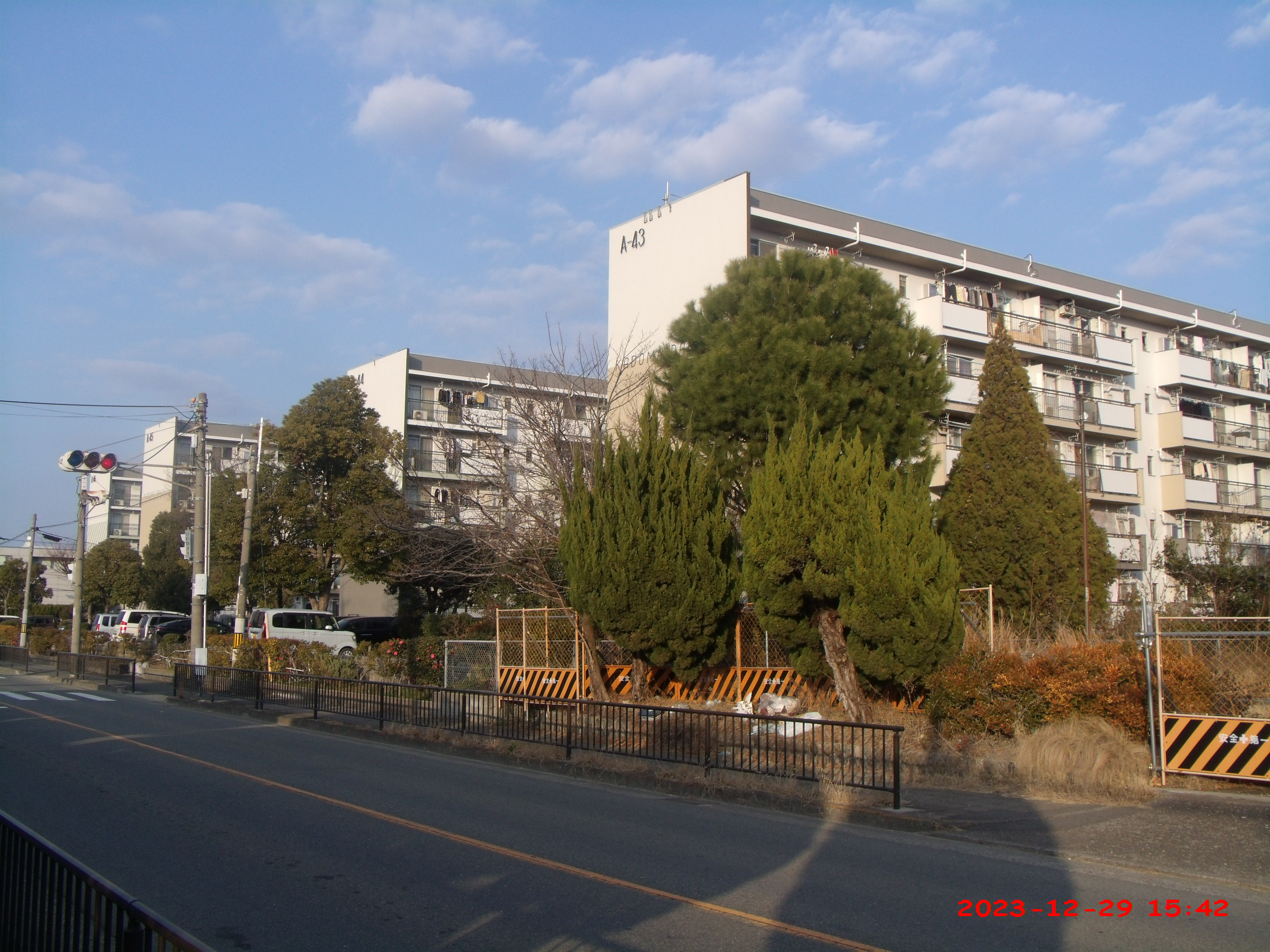

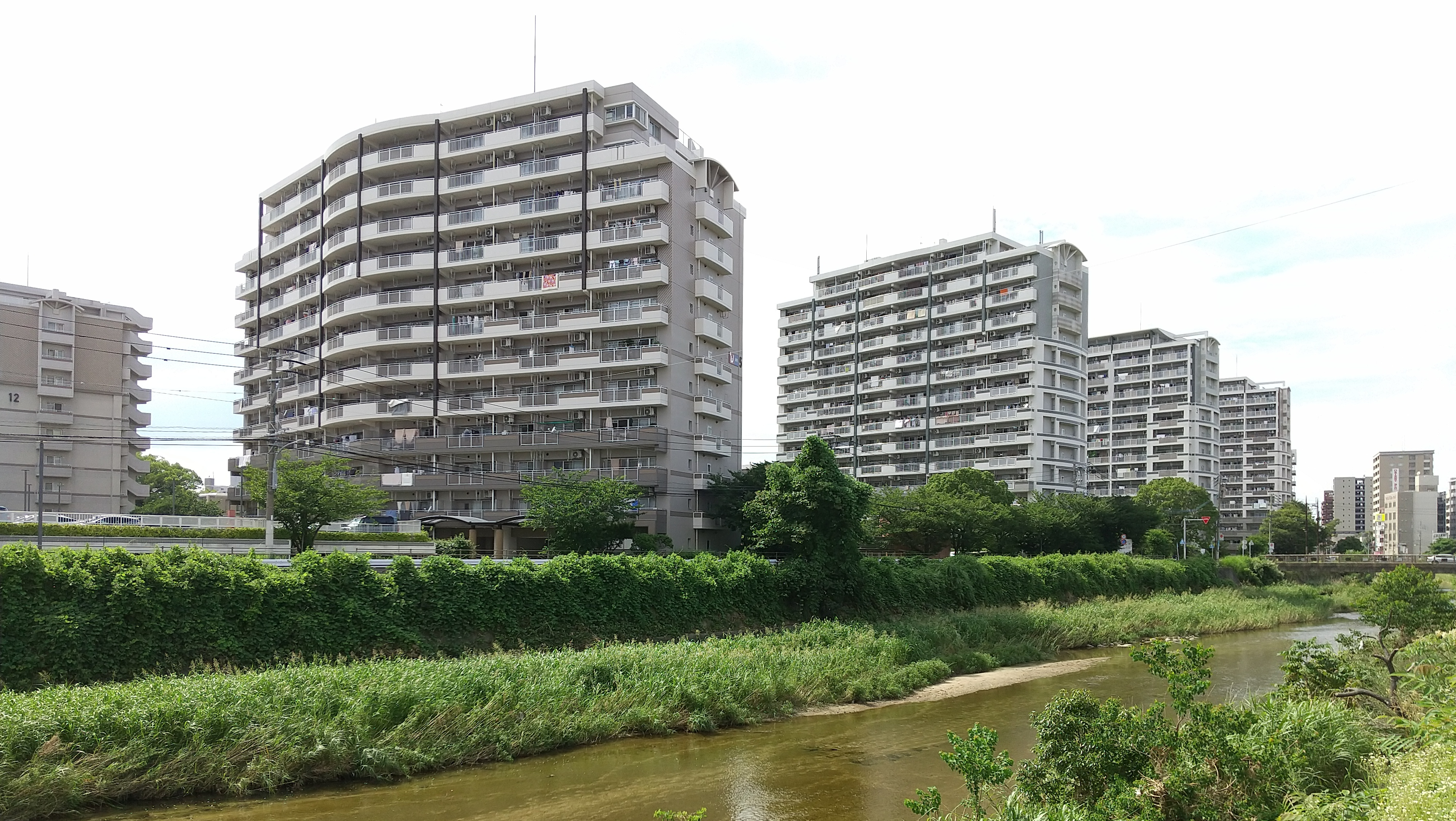

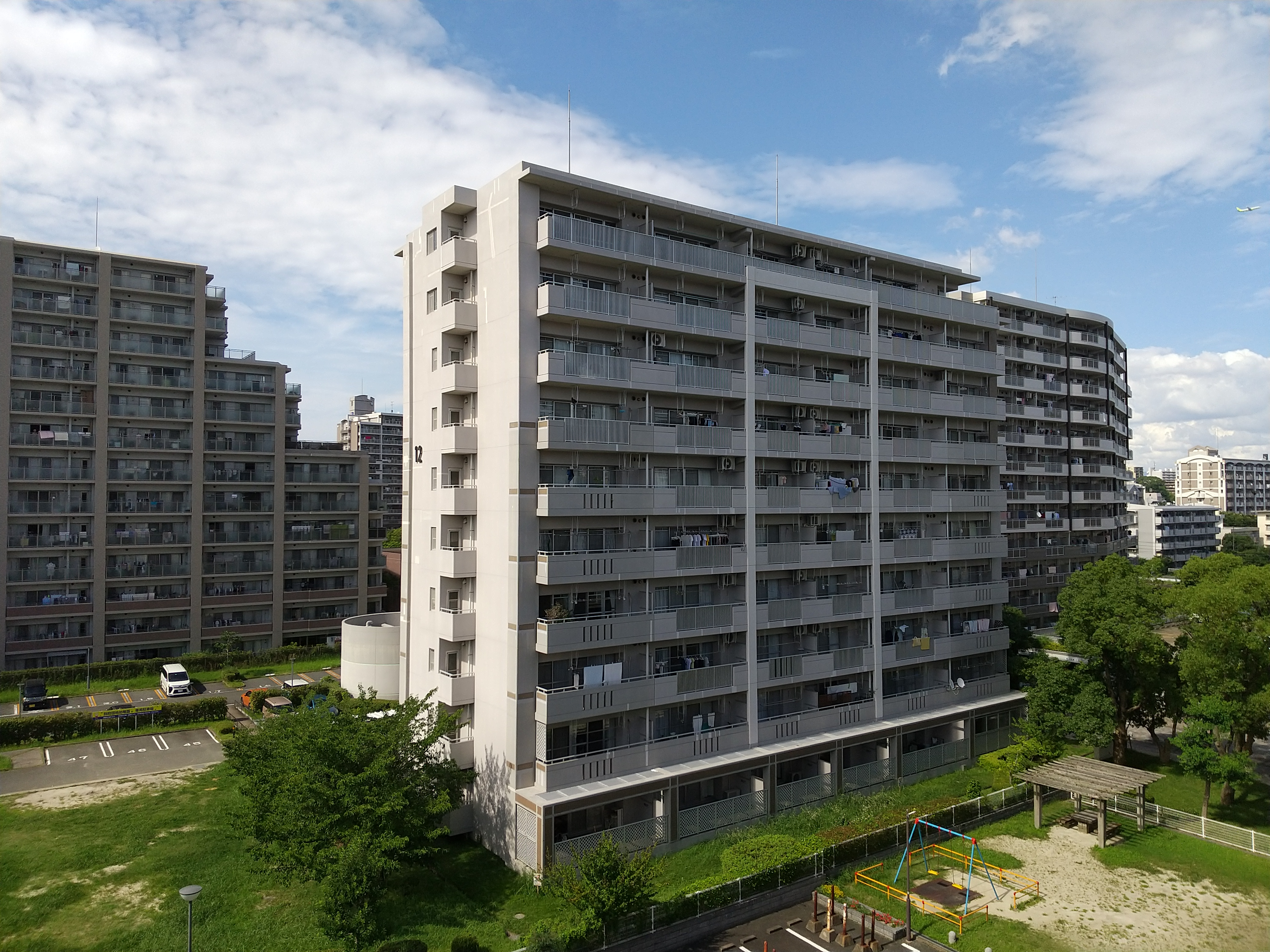

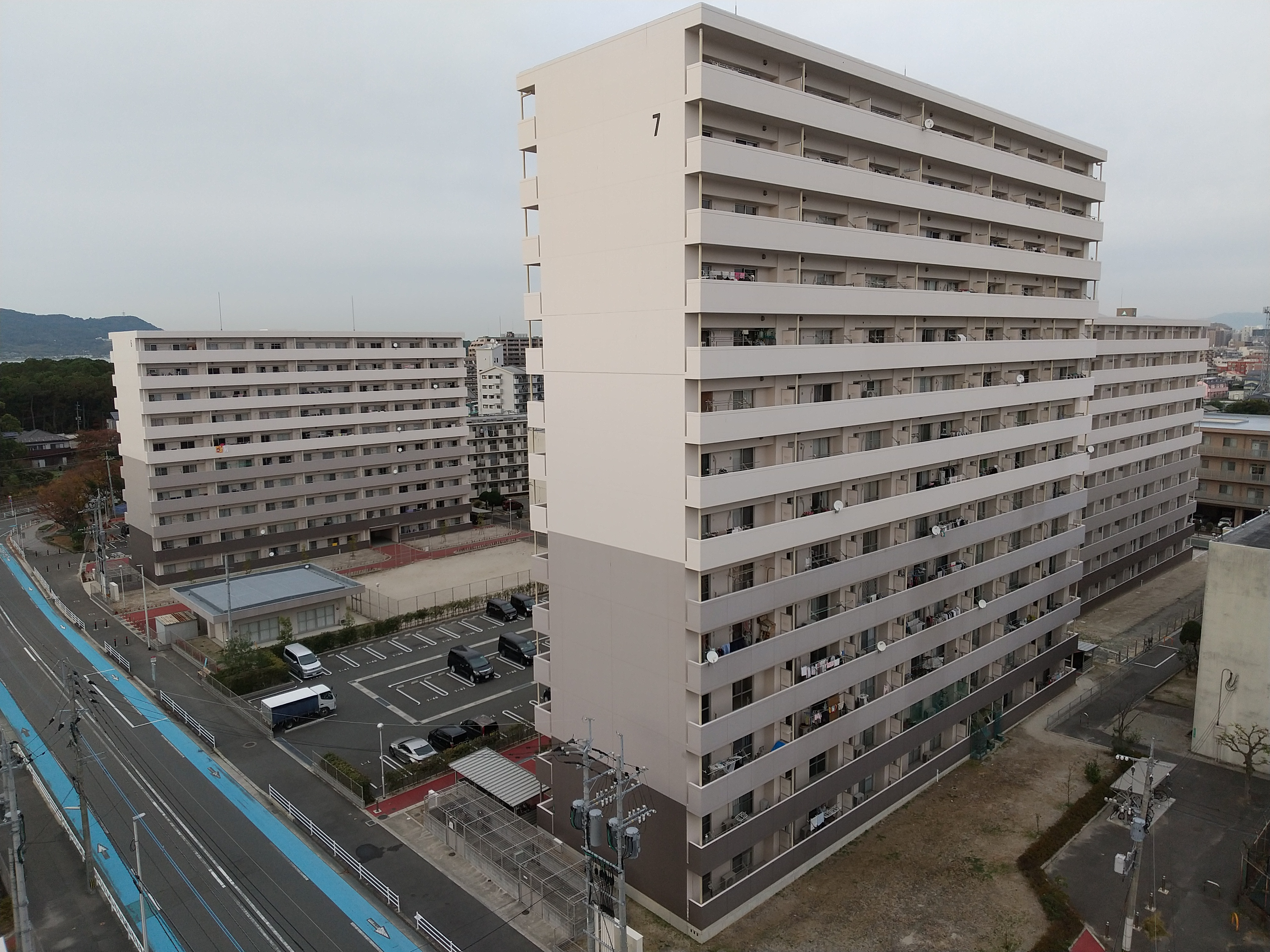

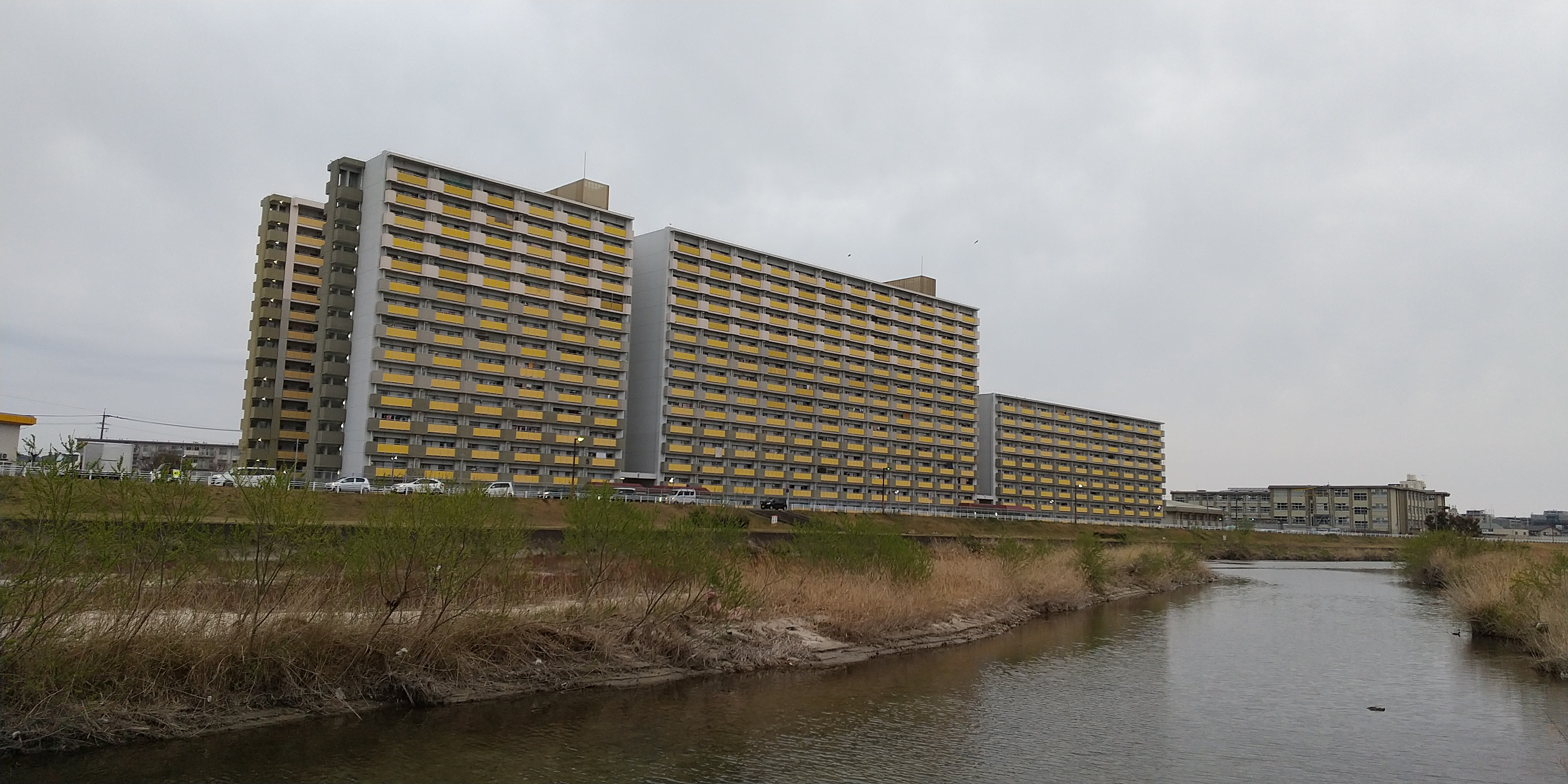

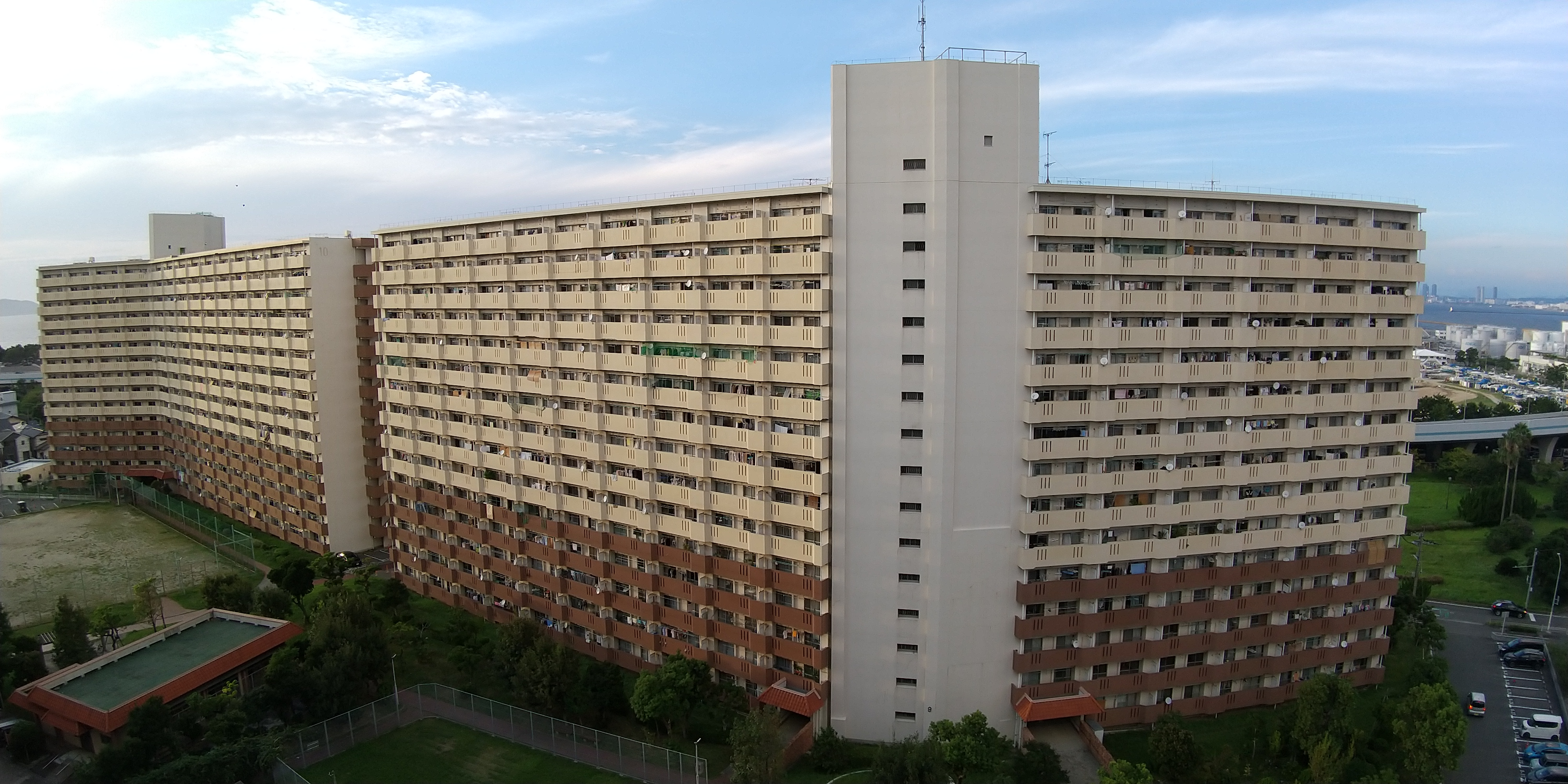

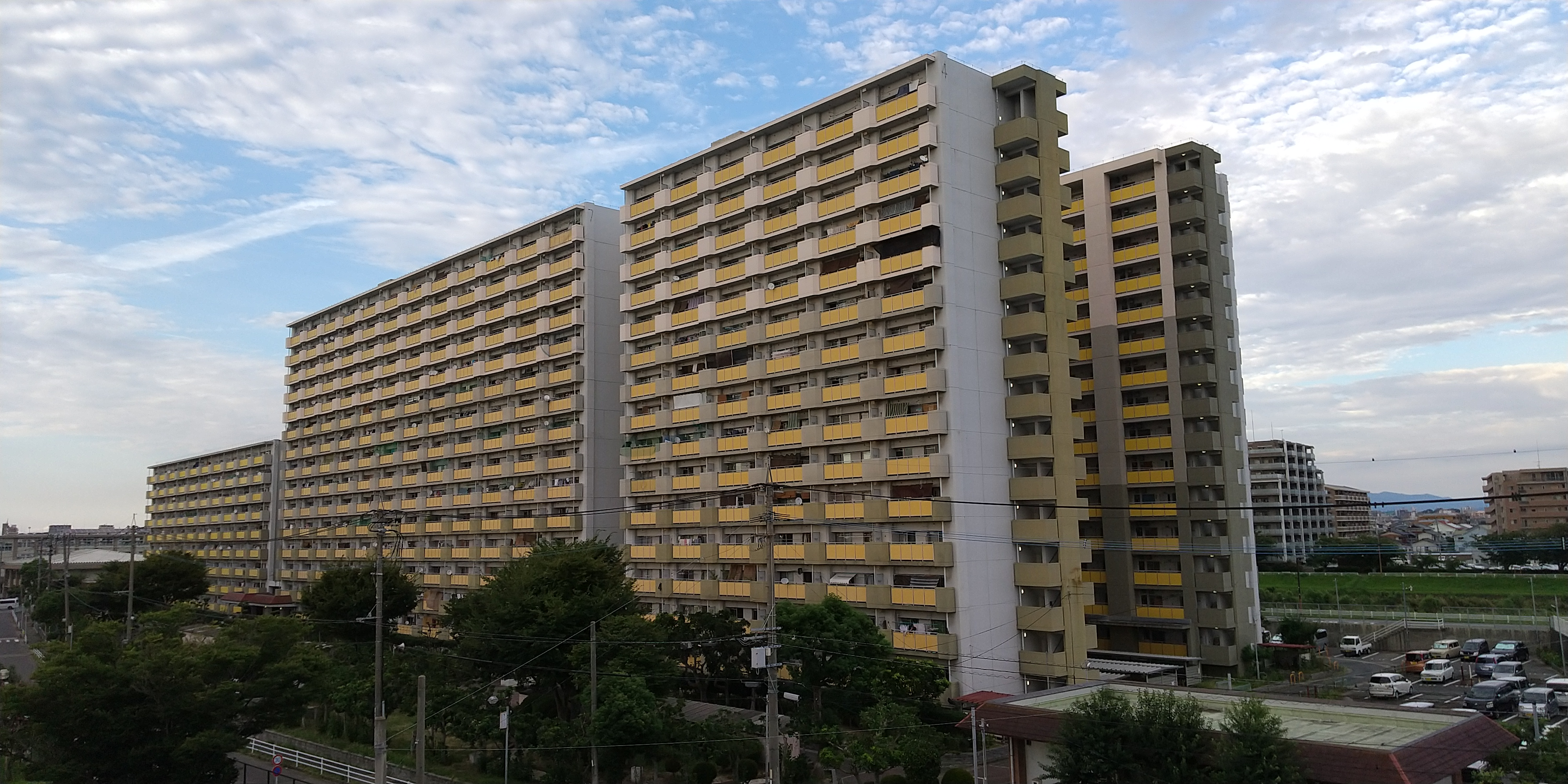

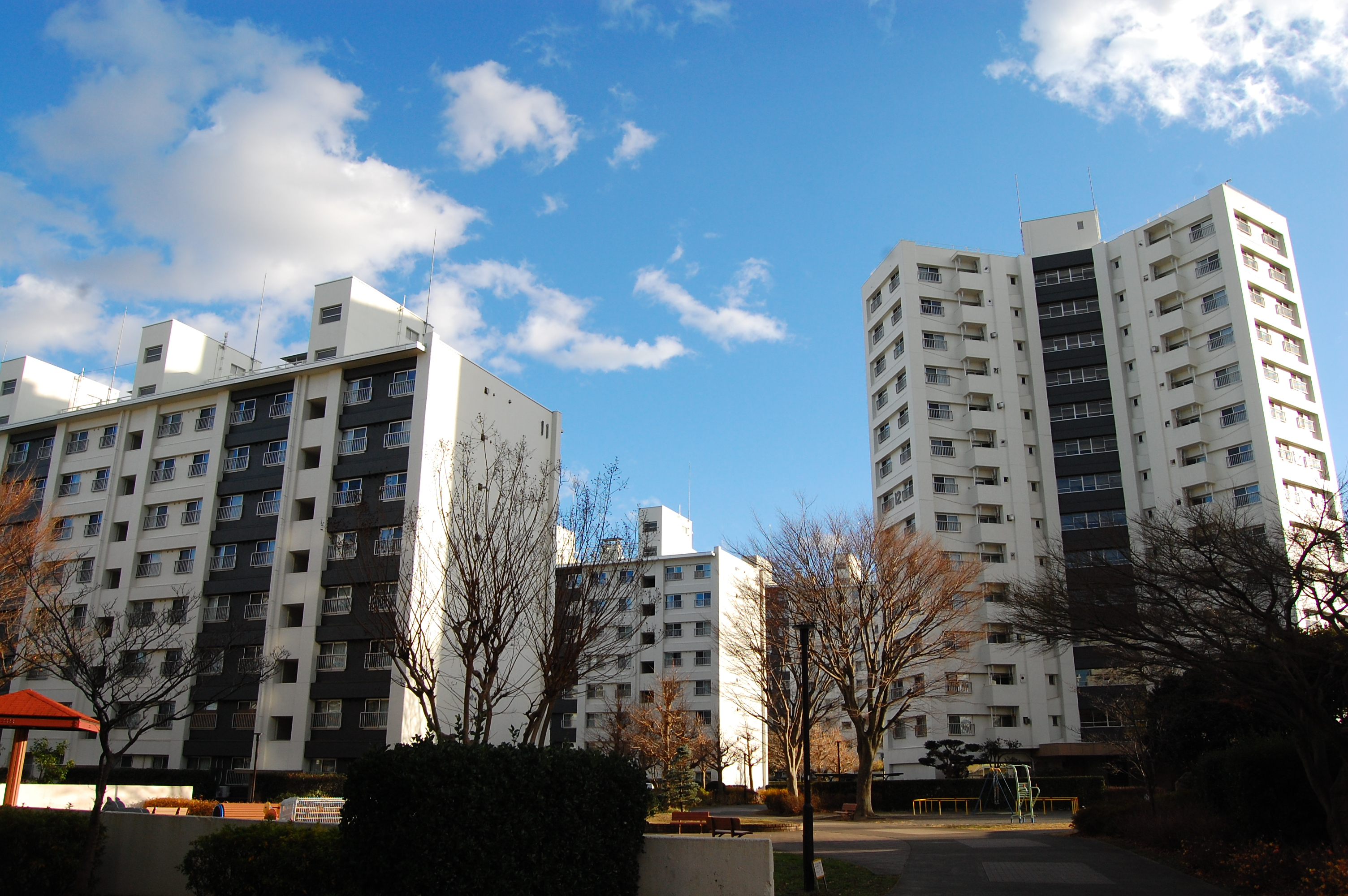

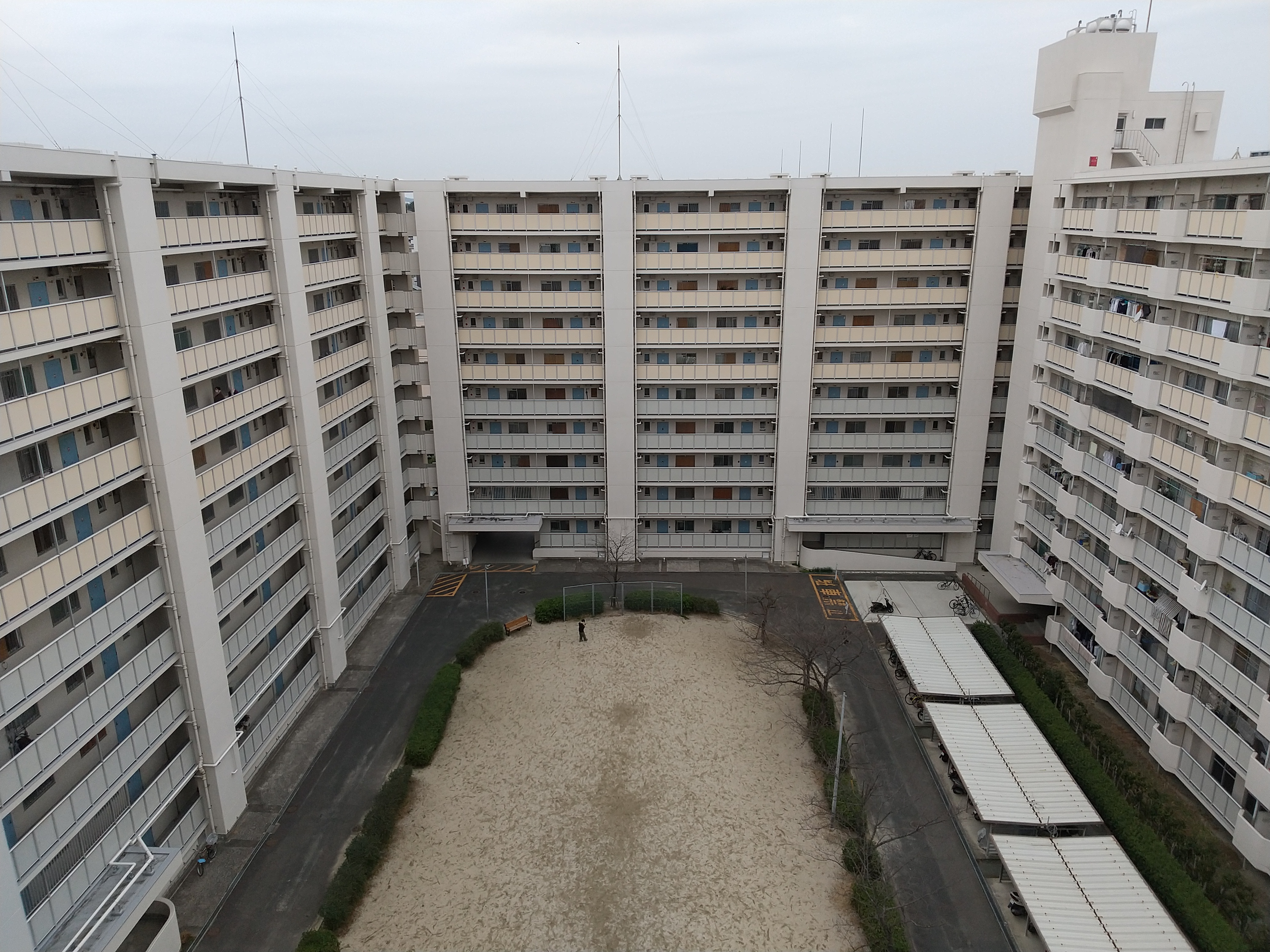

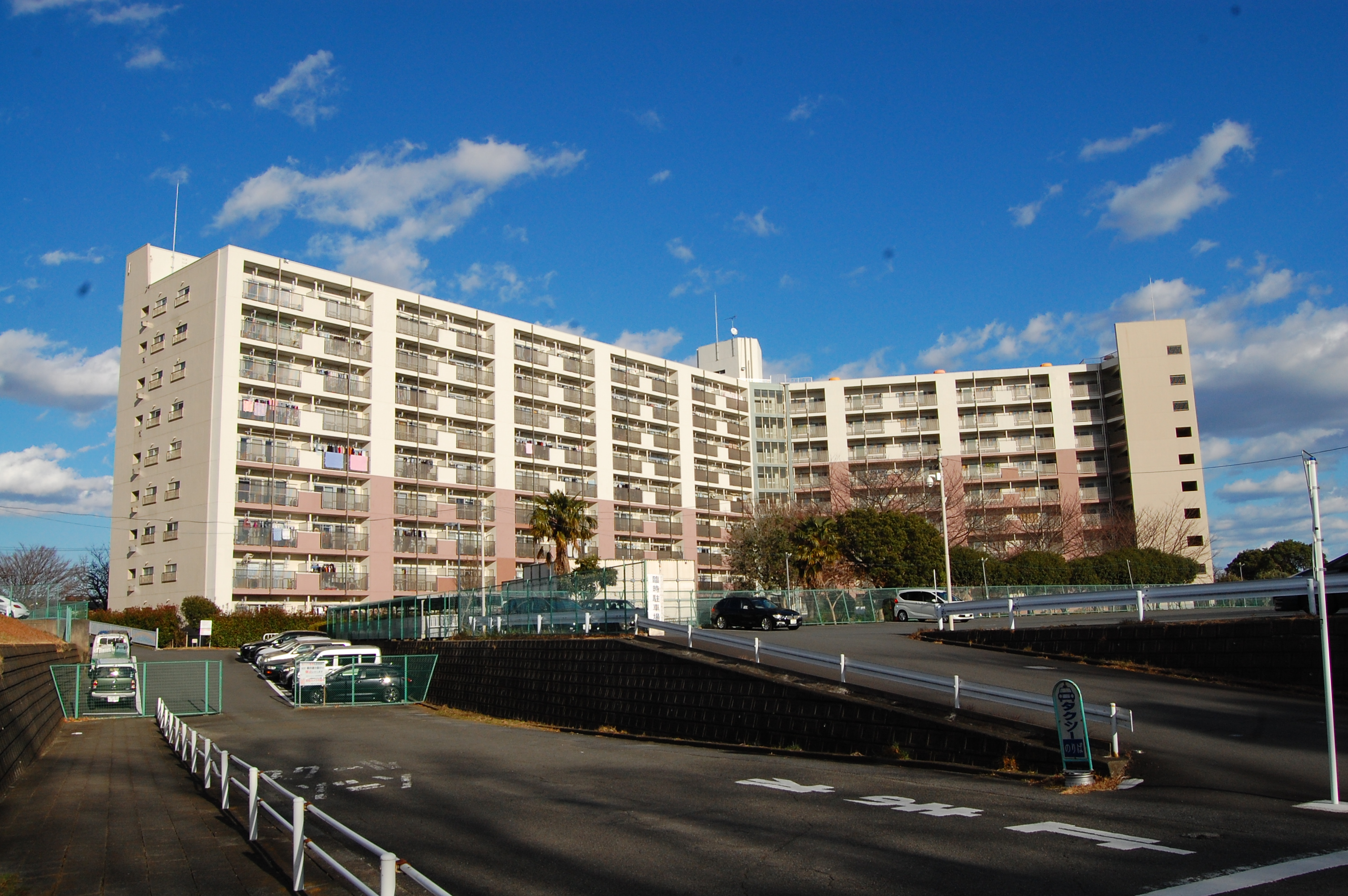

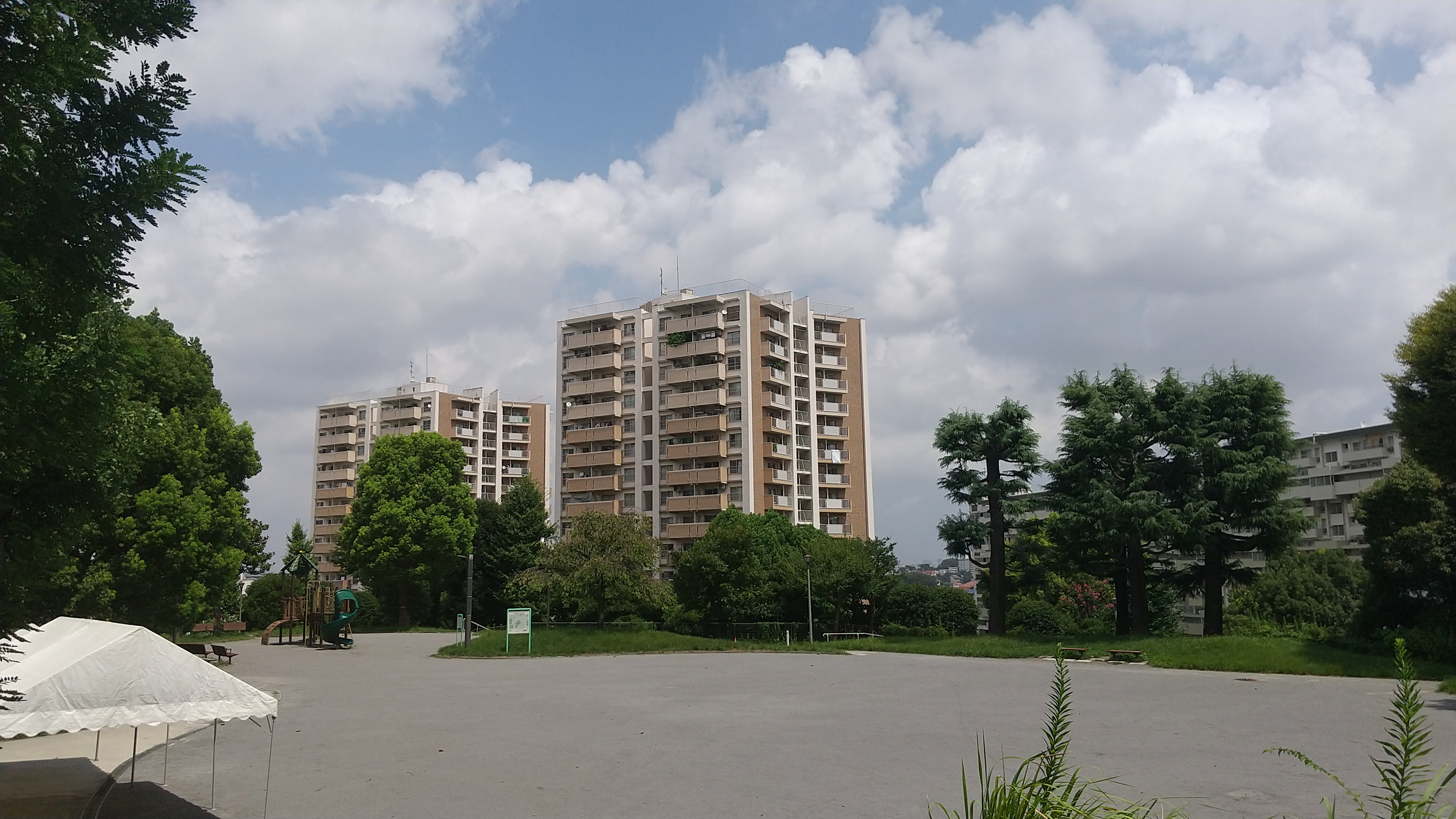

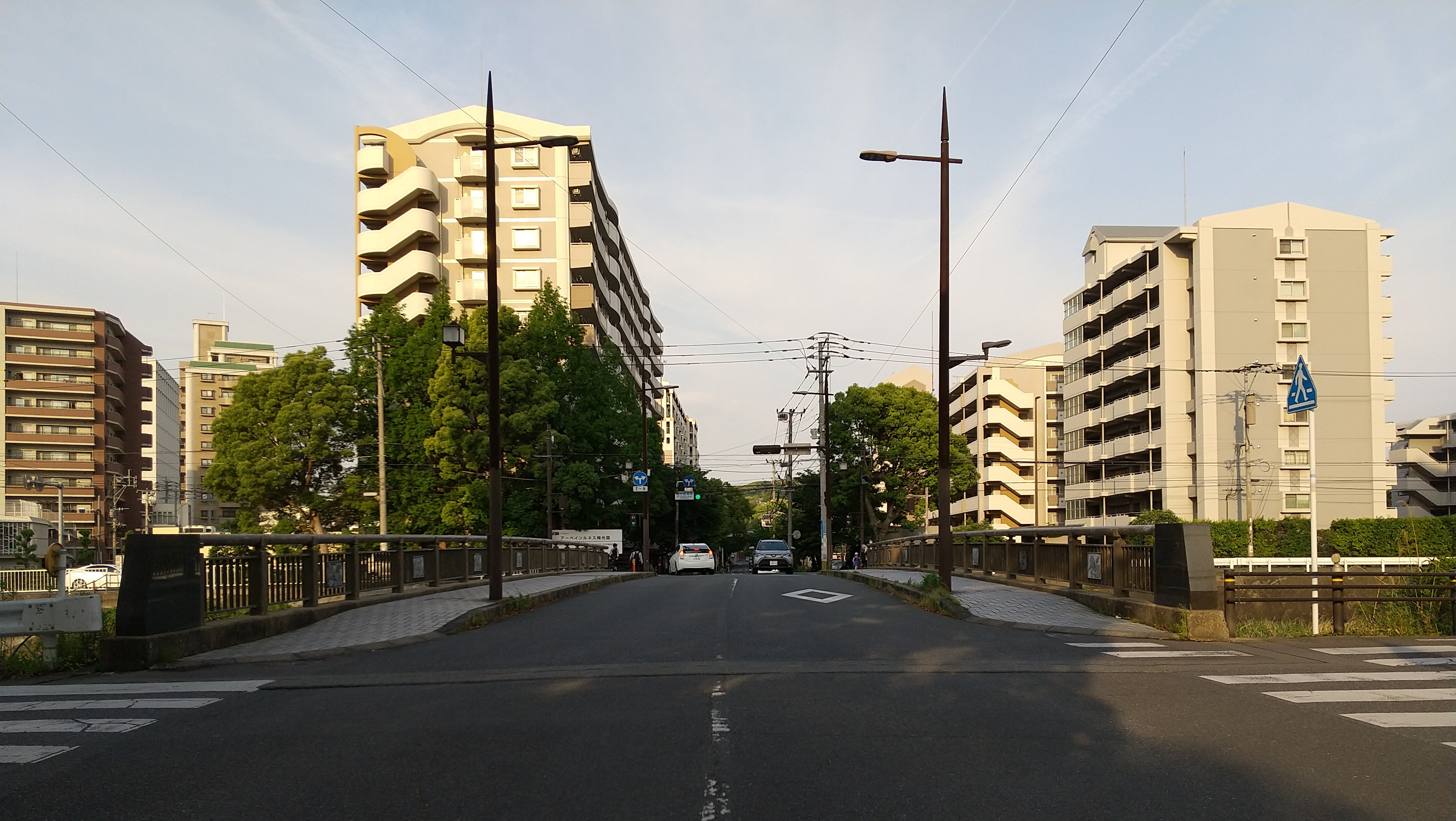

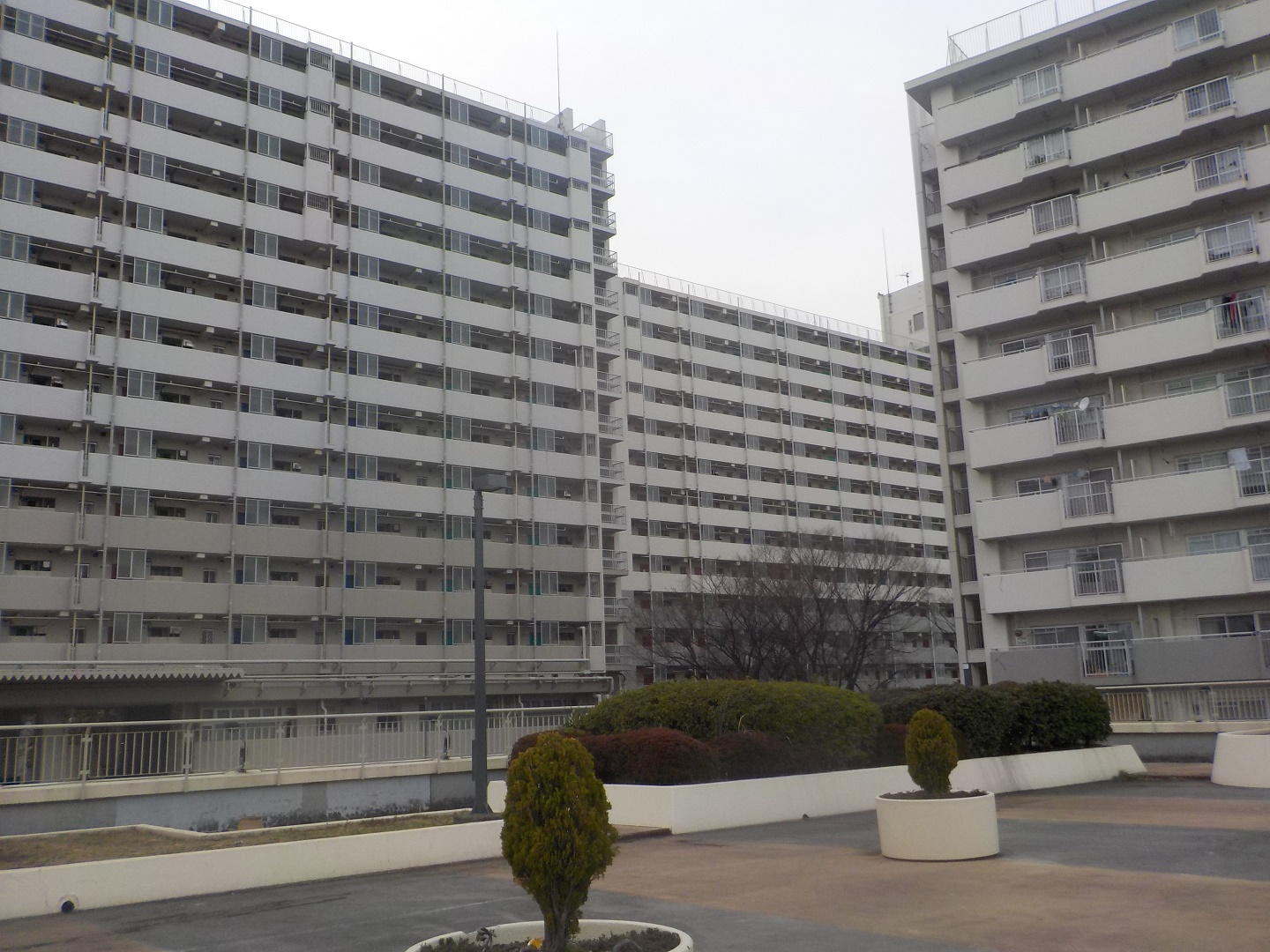

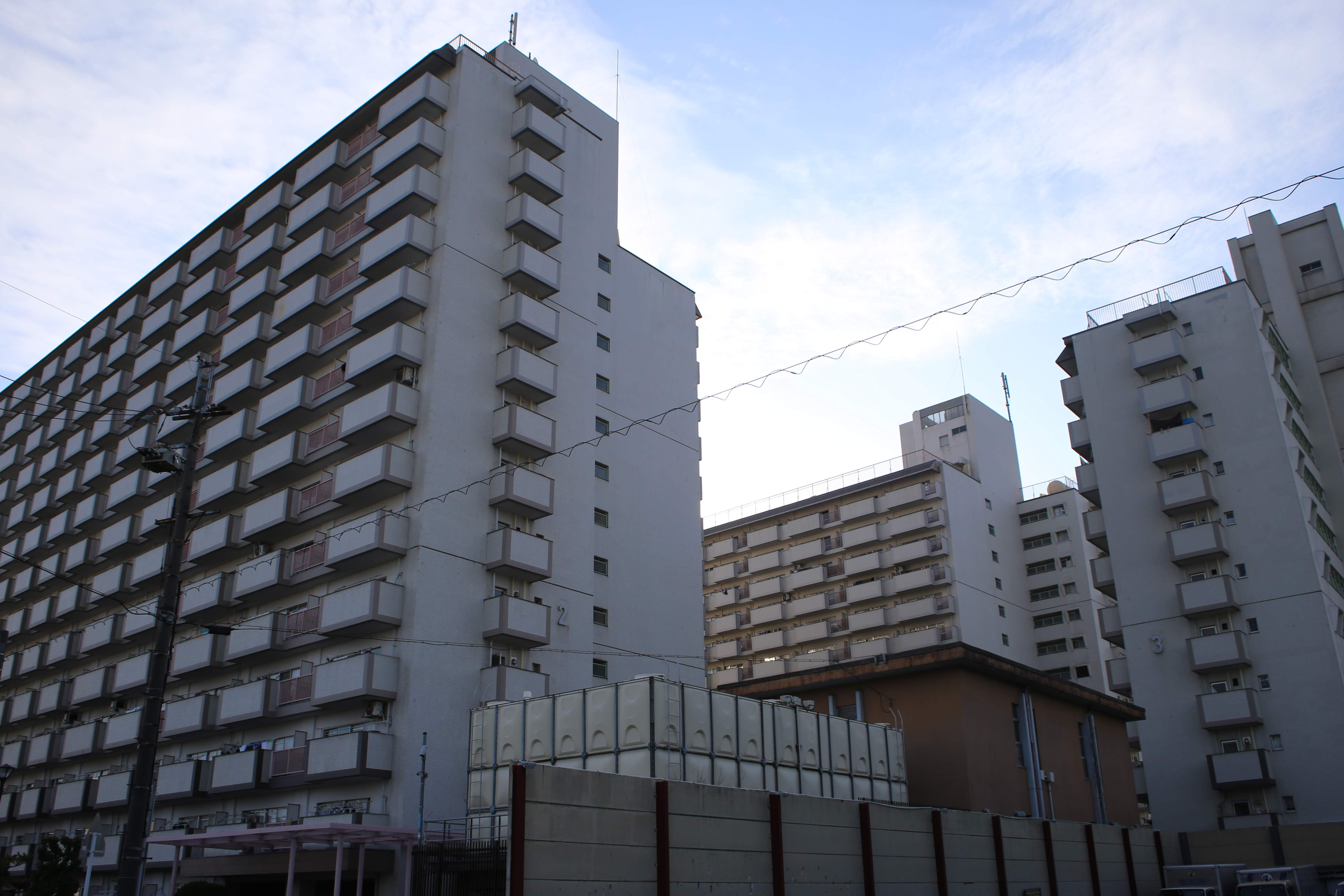

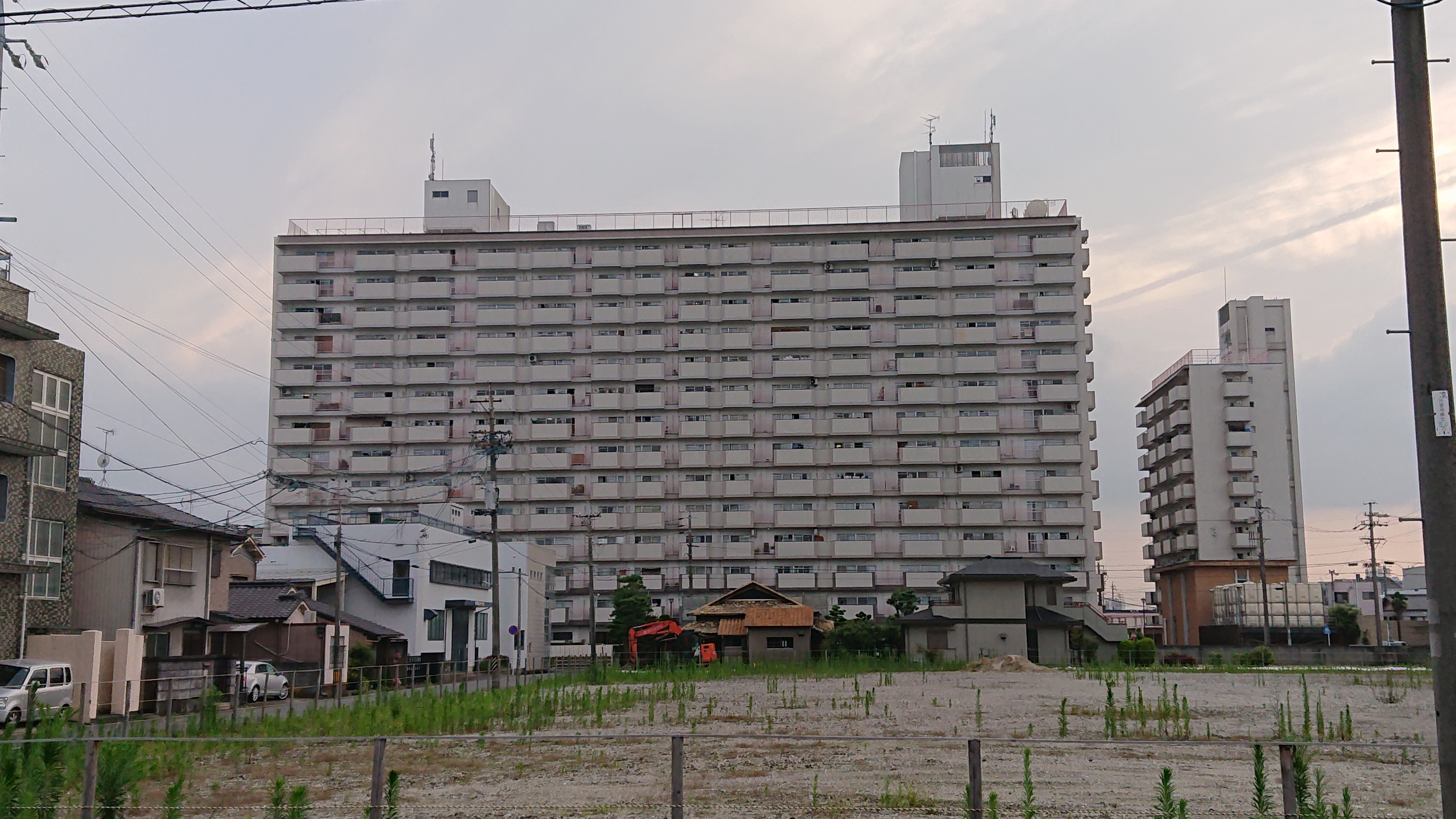

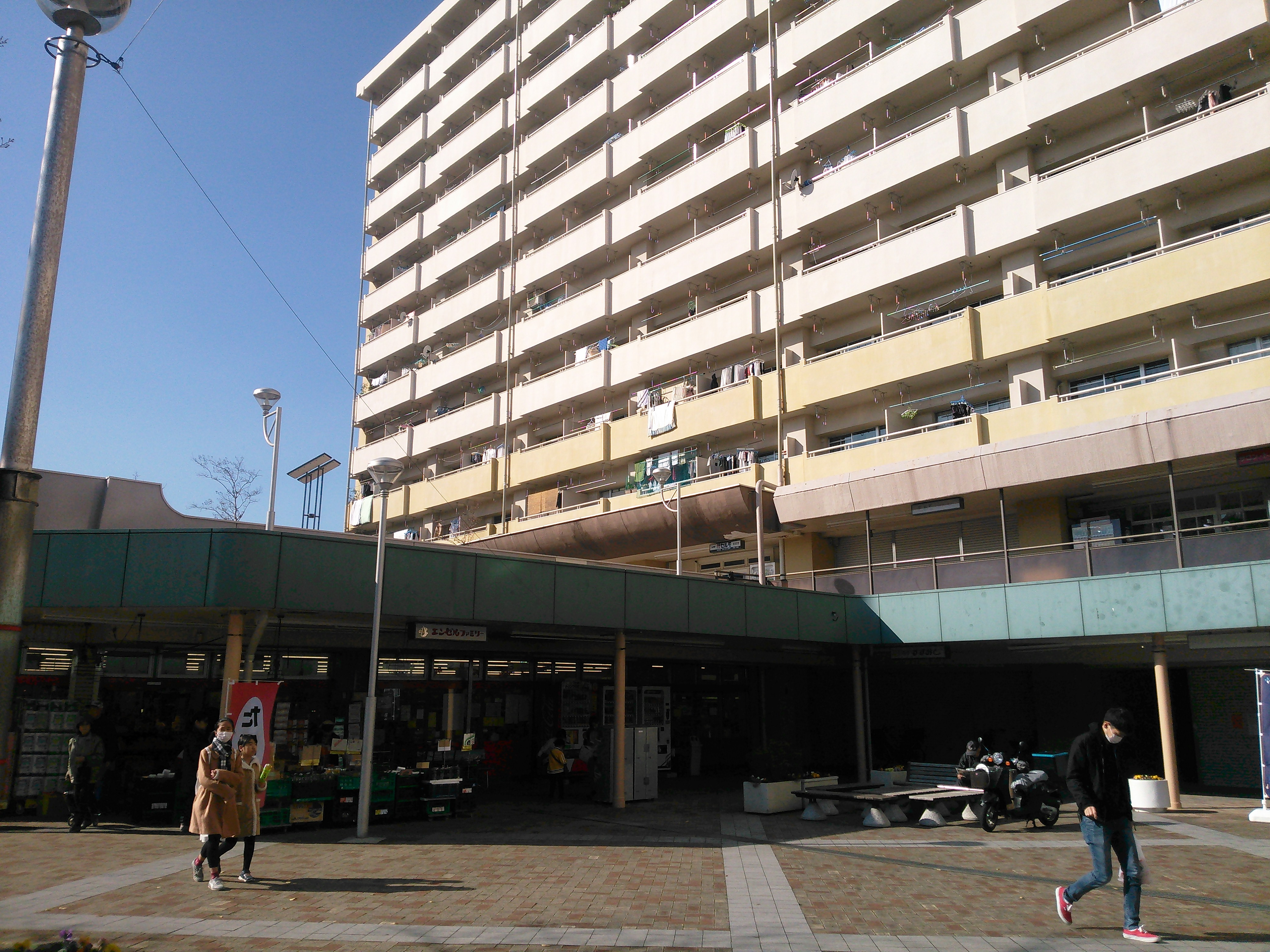

== See also ==
- Housing in China
- Housing in New Zealand
