= Louise de Maisonblanche =

French noblewoman (1676–1718)

- Baroness of La Queue
- Full name: Louise de Maisonblanche
- Known for: Illegitimate child of Louis XIV of France
- Born: 17 June 1676; Paris, Kingdom of France
- Died: 12 September 1718 (aged 42); La Queue-les-Yvelines, Kingdom of France
- Spouses: Bernard de Prez, Baron of La Queue
- Issue: 11
- Father: Louis XIV
- Mother: Claude de Vin des Œillets

Louise de Maisonblanche, Baronne de La Queue (17 June 1676 – 12 September 1718), was a French noblewoman, the illegitimate daughter of Louis XIV, King of France and his mistress, Claude de Vin des Œillets. She became the Baroness of La Queue by her marriage to Bernard de Prez.

== Life ==
Her father, Louis XIV in 1700/1701 on a portrait by Hyacinthe Rigaud

=== Early life ===
Louise de Maisonblanche was born on 17 June 1676 in Paris to Claude de Vin des Œillets, Mademoiselle des Œillets (1637–1687), the maid of honour (demoiselle de compagnie) or chambermaid (femme de chambre) of Françoise-Athénaïs de Rochechouart, Marquise of Montespan (1640 –1707). Madame de Montespan had been the maîtresse-en-titre (official mistress) of Louis XIV, King of France (1638–1715) for 9 years, during which he had relationships with other women as well, including Mademoiselle des Œillets. She was officially recorded as the daughter of former cavalry captain Philippe de Maisonblanche and his wife, born Lady Gabrielle de La Tour.

The supposed parents were fictitous, with the name being derived from Chateau de Maison Blanche in Gagny, a property owned by Philippe, Duke of Orleans and where several of his illegitimate children lived.

She was baptised with her god-parents being; François Quiquebeuf de Rossy, brigadier-general and knight of the military order of Saint-Louis and Marguerite -Françoise Morel.

Maisonblanche´s maternal grand-parents were the actors, Nicolas de Vin (also known as sieur des Œillets and Louise Faviot (d. 1670).

As Maisonblanche's mother was known to have had several lovers, the king always doubted her paternity, even after she had reportedly grown up to closely resemble him. He never recognised or legitimised her, and treated her poorly as an adult.

She was brought up in Paris by her mother and did not receive the same attention that the king's other illegitimate children (by Louise de La Vallière and Madame de Montespan) did. For a while, she lived at the Castle of Suisnes, where her mother died in 1687. Other sources state that her mother died while incarcarated for life by Louis in the general hospital of Tours, after her involvement in the Affair of the poisons.

After her mother´s death she was placed in the care of siblings François and Catherine Le Signerre in Mulcent. Francois was a priest (French: curé) in Montfort.

== Marriage and later life ==
Maisonblanche remained in Mulcent with the Le Signerres until the age of 20. On 17 April 1696, she married Bernard de Prez, Baron of La Queue, lieutenant of the regiment of Burgundy. The wedding's organisation was overseen by Alexandre Bontemps (1626–1701), first valet of the king's bedchamber (premier valet de la chambre du roi), who secured a dowry of 40 000 livres, silver, and jewels for the bride. This was close to nothing compared to the dowries of her legitimised half-sisters: when Marie-Anne de Bourbon (1666–1739) married in 1680, she received 1 million livres. So did Louise-Françoise de Bourbon in 1685, while Françoise-Marie de Bourbon (1677–1749) received 2 million livres and the Palais-Royal.

As the king did not want to recognise [Louise de Maisonblanche], he had her baptised and married under the false names given to her and assumed to be [those of] her father and mother, when she was married because she did not want to be a nun. (...) [Abbé de Brisacier] arranged (...) the conditions of this contract, the dowry of which was very small compared with the prince whose daughter she was.

— Charles-René d'Hozier,

Bontemps, the king's confidant for his domestic secrets arranged the marriage and stipulated [it] without declaring any father or mother (...) The woman resembled the king strongly, she was tall and, to her misfortune, she knew who she was and envied her three sisters who were acknowledged and so greatly married. She and her husband lived together very well and had several children who remained in obscurity. The son-in-law almost never appeared at court as the simplest officer (...)

— Louis de Rouvroy, Duke of Saint-Simon, Mémoires, Volumes 7-8,

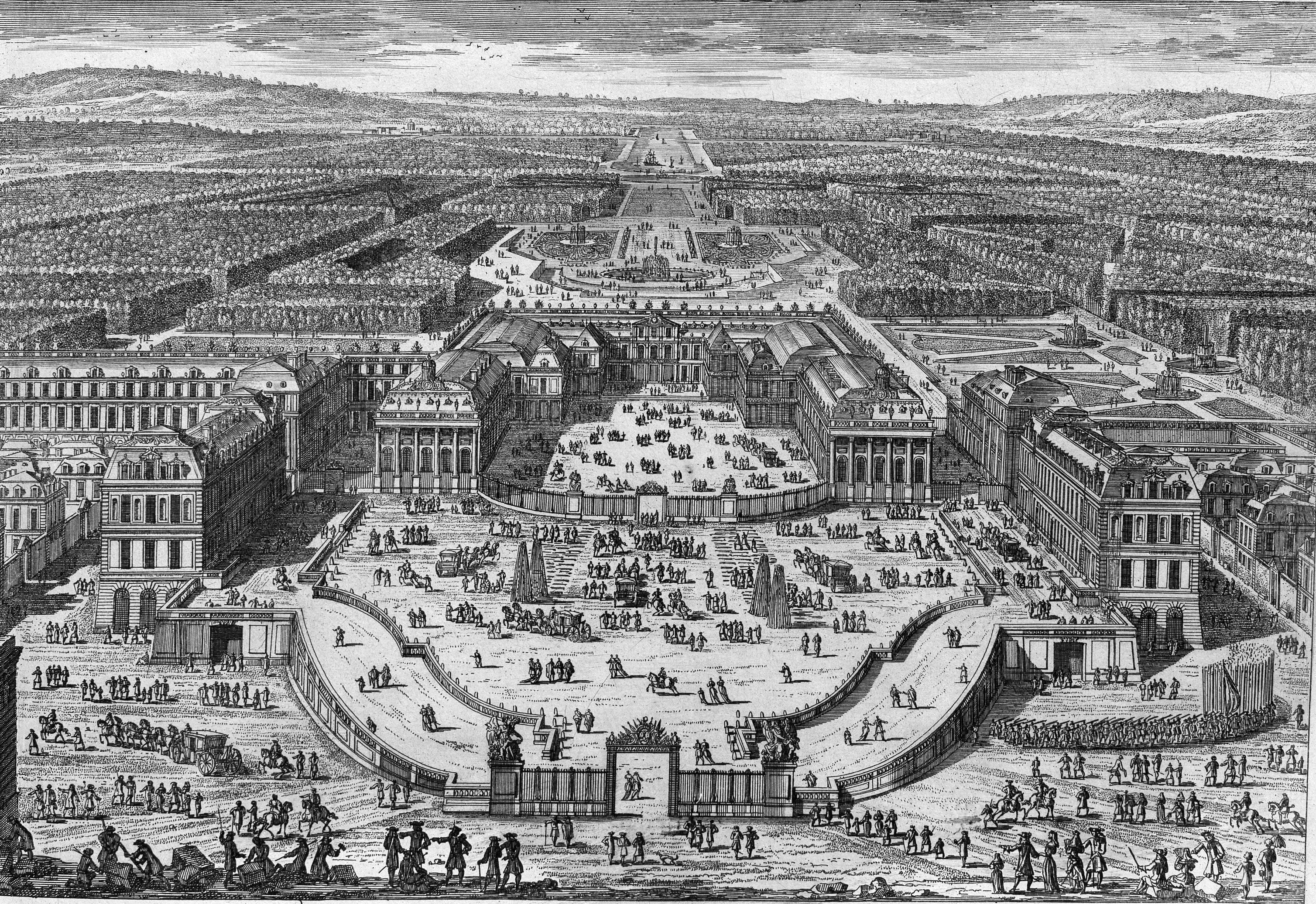
The Palace of Versailles around 1682, as depicted by Adam Perelle

Later, was appointed a member of the Gardes du Corps (Life Guards). As an adult, which allowed her to visit the Palace of Versailles, but she never frequented the court. She only ever went outside veiled in order to avoid scandals and keep people from noting her similarity to the king in appearance. She had 11 children by her husband, 6 of whom survived infancy. On their birth certificates, she was recorded as Dame Louise de Bourbon-Maisonblanche, fille naturelle du Roi ("Lady Louise of Bourbon-Maisonblanche, natural daughter of the King"). Two of her daughters, Charlotte-Angélique (1703–1723) and Louise-Catherine (1709–1756) attended the Maison royale de Saint-Louis in Saint-Cyr, Madame de Maintenon's boarding school for daughters of the nobility. In their school records, they were called petite-filles du Roi ("granddaughters of the King").

== Death ==
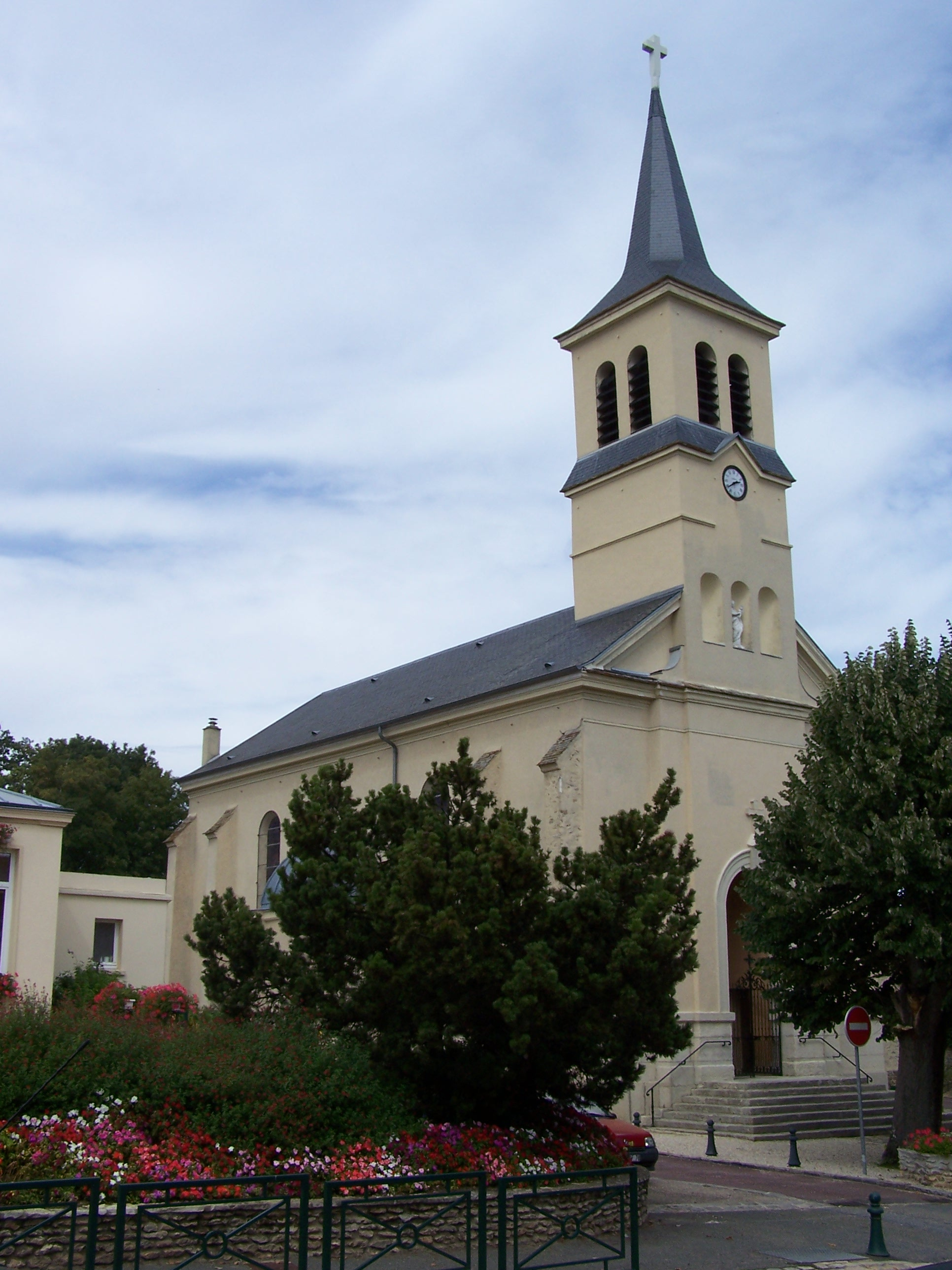
Burial place of Louise de Maisonblanche

Maisonblanche died of smallpox on 12 September 1718 at La Queue-les-Yvelines. and was buried in chapel of the church of Église Saint-Nicolas de La Queue-les-Yvelines in the parish of Galluis.

== Issue ==
Louise de Maisonblanche had 11 children by her husband, Bernard de Prez, Baron of La Queue, 6 of whom survived to adulthood:

1. Louise Renée de Prez (Montfort l'Amaury, 27 October 1699 – 1705), died at the age of 6
2. Louis Bernard de Prez (born and died Montfort l'Amaury, 17 March 1701), stillborn
3. Charlotte Angélique de Prez (Montfort l'Amaury, 11 October 1703 – 1723), died of hypothermia at the age of 19 or 20 after falling into a lake
4. Louis Charles Timothée de Prez (14 October 1704 – 1746), married Madeleine Marguerite Charlotte Soulaigre des Fossés and died after falling from a horse
5. A son, maybe Stanislas Henri de Prez (born and died Montfort l'Amaury, 4 September 1706), stillborn
6. Alexandre-Paul-Cyr de Prez (Montfort l'Amaury, 5 August 1708 – Neauphle le Vieux, 8 October 1777), first married Marie Jeanne de Malebranche on 3 February 1755, then Claude Marguerite Le Cousturier du Meny in 1763
7. Louise Catherine de Prez (La Queue-les-Yvelines, 16 June 1709 – 1756), married Timothée de Vaultier de Petitmont on 10 October 1745
8. Françoise de Prez (5 January 1711 – 1715), died of scarlet fever at the age of 3 or 4
9. Guillaume Jacques de Prez (Gallais, 15 November 1713 – La Queue les Yvelines, 5 October 1804), married Françoise Perrette Le Bœuf in 1754
10. Marguerite Françoise de Prez (Gallins-la-Queue, 15 May 1715 – Montfort l'Amaury, 1786)
11. Philippe Charles de Prez (Gallins-la-Queue, 8 August 1718 – February 1719), died at the age of 6 months
