= Roomsharing =

Sharing a bedroom

Roomsharing is where two or more people occupy a room, typically a bedroom. Roomsharing is the norm in some cultures, such as by Mayan families in rural Guatemala. In cultures where it is not normal, it may be comported out of viability, perhaps due to impoverishment.

== China ==
Due to high rental and housing costs in China, splitting a room and sharing a bed has become a budgeting trend.

== See also ==
- Family
