= Royal bastard =

Child of a reigning monarch born out of wedlock

Arms of the Duke of Grafton, an illegitimate son of Charles II, showing a baton sinister

A royal bastard is a child of a reigning monarch born out of wedlock. The king might have a child with a mistress, or the legitimacy of a marriage might be questioned for reasons concerning succession.

Notable royal bastards include Robert, Earl of Gloucester, son of Henry I of England, Henry FitzRoy, son of Henry VIII of England, and the Duke of Monmouth, son of Charles II. The Anglo-Norman surname Fitzroy means son of a king and was used by various illegitimate royal offspring, and by others who claimed to be such. In medieval England, a bastard's coat of arms was marked with a bend or baton sinister.

Notable fictional examples include Mordred, the villainous illegitimate son of King Arthur. Some fictional portrayals of royal bastards are less negative, such as the character of Philip the Bastard in William Shakespeare's King John.

== Ancient Rome ==
Unlike medieval royalty, the Romans were more concerned with continuity of family name than with bloodline. If a man recognized a child as his, this was accepted by law, and the issue of who the biological father was did not arise. Children not recognized could be exposed or brought up as a slave. For example, Emperor Claudius initially accepted a girl as his daughter, but later rejected her and had her exposed. Emperors often adopted their successors. There are no recorded examples of aristocrats in classical times accusing other aristocrats of being illegitimate, as was common in later periods.

Caesarion was possibly the illegitimate son of Julius Caesar by Cleopatra, which would also make him Caesar's only known child besides Julia.

== Belgium ==
A book published in February 2011 claimed that Albert II of Belgium has an illegitimate half-sister named Ingeborg Verdun, the daughter of King Leopold III and Austrian-Belgian ice skater Liselotte Landbeck.

In October 2020, the illegitimate daughter of Albert II of Belgium was legally acknowledged after DNA testing to be titled Princess Delphine of Belgium by the Belgian Court of Appeal. Ms Delphine Boël intends to change her surname to her father's Saxe-Coburg.

=== Flanders and Brabant ===
Older illegitimate children founded important family branches, as reported in the Trophées de Brabant: tome 1:

- House of Witthem, legitimised son of John II, Duke of Brabant.
- House of Brant, legitimised son of John III, Duke of Brabant.
- House of Glymes, legitimised son of John II, Duke of Brabant.
- House of Nassau-Corroy, legitimised son of Henry III of Nassau-Breda
- House of Dongelberghe, legitimised son of John I, Duke of Brabant.
- House of Mechelen, legitimised son of John I, Duke of Brabant.

== England, Scotland, Great Britain and the United Kingdom ==
=== English kings ===
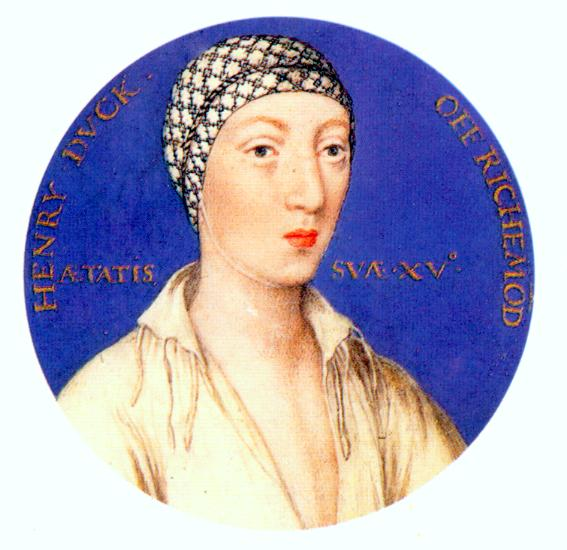
Henry Fitzroy was the illegitimate son of King Henry VIII by teenage mistress Elizabeth Blount.

==== Papal legates decree in 786 ====
In the Anglo-Saxon Heptarchy then Kingdom, descendants of kings were called aethelings, whether legitimate or not. When a kingship became vacant, a Witan would meet to name an aetheling as king. Papal legates visited the great hall of Offa of Mercia in 786 and decreed that an English king "must not be begotten in adultery or incest" and that "he who was not born of a legitimate marriage" could not succeed to the throne. It is likely no rule of succession had set as to bastardy before this decree.

==== Anglo-Saxon kings ====
Two Anglo-Saxon kings of England had sons who faced opposition to their succession seemingly based on the status of their mother. Leading figures in the kingdom refused to accept the succession of Æthelstan, eldest son of Edward the Elder. Some medieval chroniclers writing centuries later describe his mother, Ecgwynn, as a concubine or of low social status, while others portray her as a noble wife, and some modern historians have attributed the challenge to his succession as related to questions of the status of his mother. Edward the Martyr, eldest son of Edgar the Peaceful, likewise faced opposition due to the nature of his birth. A contemporary charter calls the king's later spouse his 'lawful wife' and seems to afford her son, Edmund, a higher status than his elder half-brother, Edward. Later chroniclers are contradictory, one making Edward an illegitimate child born to a nun, another calling his mother a noblewoman wed to his father. Scholarly opinion is divided whether Edward was born to an extramarital liaison or simply bore lesser status because his mother had not been consecrated as queen, unlike the powerful Ælfthryth, mother of his younger half-brothers.

==== Henry I ====
Henry I had about two dozen recognized illegitimate children, including Robert, 1st Earl of Gloucester, Sybilla of Normandy (wife of King Alexander I of Scotland), Maud FitzRoy (wife of Conan III, Duke of Brittany), Constance FitzRoy, Mabel FitzRoy, Alice FitzRoy, Gilbert FitzRoy, and Emma. "It might be permissible to wonder how it was that Henry I managed to keep track of all his illegitimate children, but there is no doubt that he did so," wrote historian Given-Wilson.

==== Stephen ====
Gervase de Blois (written variously, often in latest books Gervais of Blois), an illegitimate son of Stephen, was Abbot of Westminster from 1138 to c. 1157. Stephen had two other illegitimate children from the same mother – Ralph and Americ of Blois.

==== Henry II ====
Henry II had several illegitimate children, most notably Geoffrey, Archbishop of York and William Longespée, 3rd Earl of Salisbury (who inherited his earldom from his wife's father, William of Salisbury). William's mother was Ida de Tosny, while Geoffrey's may have been called Ykenai.

==== Richard I ====
Richard the Lionheart had at least one illegitimate child: Philip of Cognac, who died young (possibly in battle). He features as Philip the Bastard in Shakespeare's King John.

==== John ====
John had at least five children with mistresses during his first marriage to Isabelle of Gloucester, two of whom are known to have been noblewomen. He had eight or more others including Jeanne/Joan, Lady of Wales (wife of Llywelyn the Great) and Richard FitzRoy.

==== Henry IV ====
Henry IV had one known illegitimate child, a son named Edmund by an unknown woman. Edmund was born in 1401, after Henry overthrew his cousin Richard II but before his second marriage to Joan of Navarre occurred in 1403. Edmund took holy vows in 1412 (the year before his father's death), at which point he disappears from the historical record.

==== Edward IV of England ====
Edward IV had at least five illegitimate children, including Arthur Plantagenet, 1st Viscount Lisle (later Lord Deputy of Calais) by his mistress Elizabeth Lucy.

Perkin Warbeck closely resembled Edward IV and claimed to be his son Richard of Shrewsbury; it has been theorised that Perkin was one of Edward's illegitimate children.

Richard III acceded to the throne after Parliament declared his brother's marriage to Elizabeth Woodville invalid and thus all of their children illegitimate. This ruling, known as Titulus Regius, was decided on the grounds that Edward had allegedly been pre-contracted (which was considered to be legally binding) to marry another woman, Eleanor Butler (née Talbot), at the time of their marriage. Most historians consider this to be nothing more than a dubious pretext for Richard to usurp the throne from his nephews and it was quickly repealed under Henry VII as he had married Edward IV's eldest surviving child Elizabeth of York.

==== Richard III ====
Richard III had at least two illegitimate children: John of Gloucester (Captain of Calais for a time) and Katherine, second wife of William Herbert, 2nd Earl of Pembroke.

==== Henry VIII ====
Henry VIII had one acknowledged illegitimate child, Henry FitzRoy, 1st Duke of Richmond and Somerset. As he had many mistresses, historians put forward six other likely instances including the mercenary Thomas Stukley, the poet Richard Edwardes and two of Mary Boleyn's children.

His daughter Elizabeth was in then Catholic canon law illegitimate, as Henry had married her mother, Anne Boleyn having divorced Queen Catherine; it was lawful under his new Anglican legal system.

=== Scottish kings ===
- Máel Coluim mac Alaxandair (fl. 1124–1134) was an illegitimate son of Alexander I of Scotland (r. 1107–1124) who unsuccessfully claimed his throne.
- William the Lion (r. 1165–1214) had at least 6 illegitimate children, including Isabella Mac William.
- Alexander II's (r. 1214–1249) illegitimate daughter Marjorie married Alan Durward.
- Robert the Bruce (r. 1306–1329) had possibly six illegitimate children, including Robert Bruce, Lord of Liddesdale.
- Robert II (r. 1371–1390) had 13+ illegitimate children, including Thomas Stewart, later Bishop of St Andrews.
- Robert III (r. 1390–1406) at least two illegitimate children, including John, ancestor of the Shaw Stewart baronets.
- James II (r. 1437–1460) had an illegitimate son, John Stewart, Lord of Sticks (d. 1523).
- James IV (r. 1488–1513) had at least 5 illegitimate children with his mistresses, including Alexander Stewart, Archbishop of St Andrews, James Stewart, 1st Earl of Moray and Lady Janet Stewart, la Belle Écossaise.
- James V (r. 1513–1542) had at least 9 illegitimate children with his mistresses, including Lady Jean Stewart (by Elizabeth Bethune), Robert Stewart, 1st Earl of Orkney (by Euphemia Elphinstone) and James Stewart, 1st Earl of Moray (by Margaret Erskine).

=== Kings of Great Britain ===
==== Charles II ====
Charles II fathered at least 20 illegitimate children, of whom he acknowledged 14. The most famous of these was James Scott, 1st Duke of Monmouth, his son by Lucy Walter. After Charles' death, Monmouth led a rebellion against his uncle James II. Charles had no legitimate children who survived childhood.

When Nell Gwynn brought her first child to Charles, she told it, "Come hither you little Bastard and speak to your father!". Charles responded, "Nay, Nellie, do not call the child such a name", to which Gwynn replied "Your Majesty has given me no other name by which I may call him." Charles then named the child "Beauclerk" and bestowed the title "Earl of Burford".

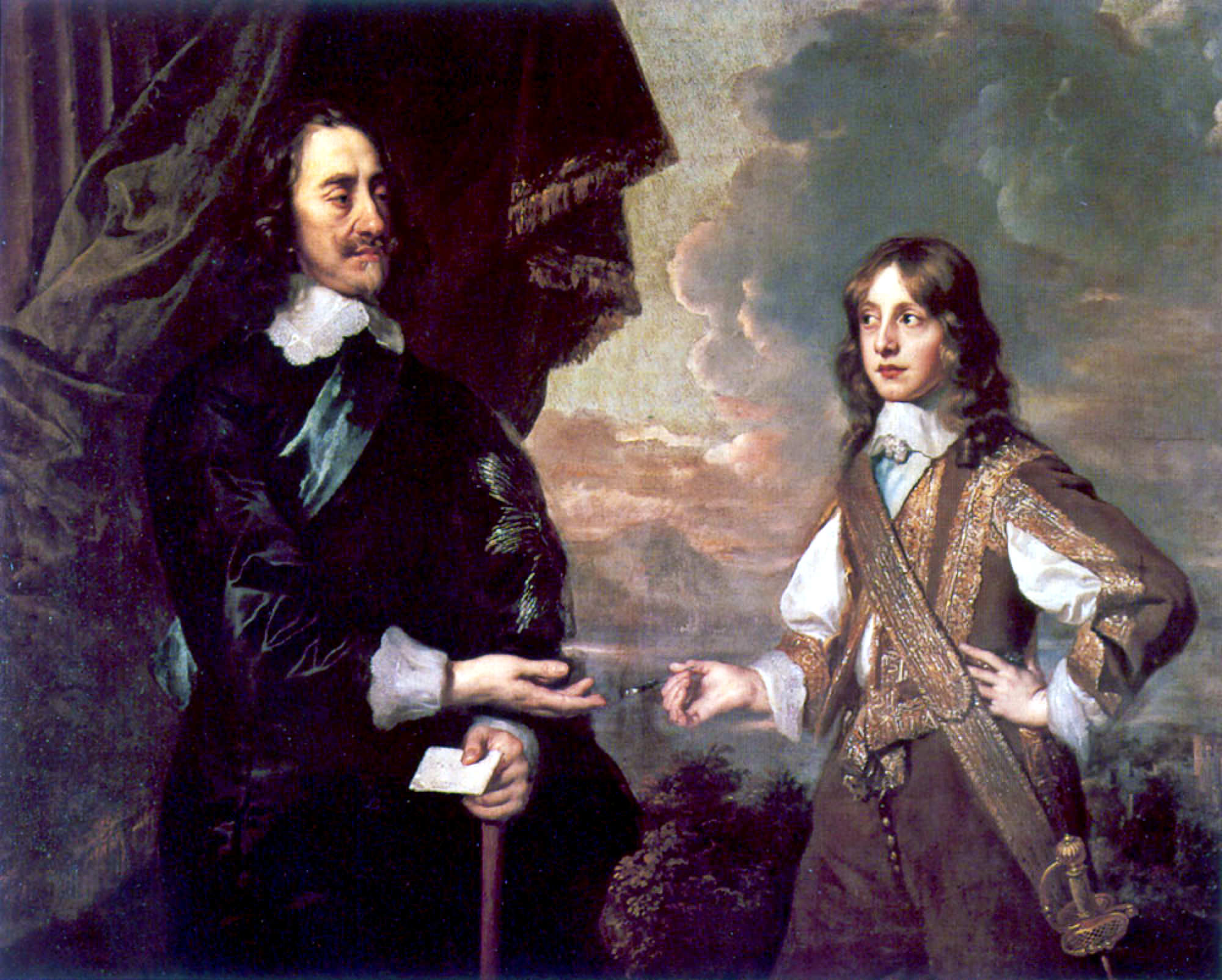
Charles I with his son, the future James II. Both James and his older brother Charles II were known for their numerous illegitimate children.

===== Illegitimate children of Charles II =====
By Lucy Walter (c.1630–1658):

1. James Scott, 1st Duke of Monmouth (1649–1685), found and executed nine days after skirmish of his forces' Battle of Sedgemoor.

By Elizabeth Boyle, Viscountess Shannon (1622–1680):

1. Charlotte FitzRoy, Countess of Yarmouth (1650–1684),

By Catherine Pegge

1. Charles FitzCharles, 1st Earl of Plymouth (1657–1680), known as "Don Carlo", created Earl of Plymouth (1675)
2. Catherine FitzCharles (born 1658; she either died young or became a nun at Dunkirk)

By Barbara Palmer, 1st Duchess of Cleveland (1641–1709)

1. Anne Lennard, Countess of Sussex (1661–1722). She may have been the daughter of Roger Palmer, but Charles accepted her.
2. Charles FitzRoy, 2nd Duke of Cleveland (1662–1730).
3. Henry FitzRoy, 1st Duke of Grafton (1663–1690). Ancestor of the Dukes of Grafton.
4. Charlotte Lee, Countess of Lichfield (1664–1717).
5. George FitzRoy, 1st Duke of Northumberland (1665–1716).
6. Lady Barbara FitzRoy (1672–1737). She was probably the child of the Duke of Marlborough. She was never acknowledged by Charles.

By Nell Gwyn (1650–1687):

1. Charles Beauclerk, 1st Duke of St Albans (1670–1726). Ancestor of the Dukes of St Albans.
2. James, Lord Beauclerk (1671–1680)

By Louise de Kérouaille, Duchess of Portsmouth (1649–1734)

1. Charles Lennox, 1st Duke of Richmond and Lennox (1672–1723). Ancestor of the Dukes of Richmond and Lennox.

By Moll Davis, courtesan and actress of repute:

1. Lady Mary Tudor (1673–1726)

==== James II and VII ====
James II and VII had 13 illegitimate children.

==== George I ====
George I had 3 illegitimate children by his mistress, Melusine von der Schulenburg, Duchess of Kendal, including Melusina von der Schulenburg, Countess of Walsingham.

=== Monarchs of the United Kingdom ===
==== William IV ====
William IV had 11 illegitimate children. They used the surname "FitzClarence", because he was Duke of Clarence.

==== Edward VII ====
Edward VII was claimed to be the natural father of the model Olga de Meyer. German comedian Hape Kerkeling claims to be his great-grandson from a liaison between Edward and his great-grandmother in Marienbad.

== France ==
Anthony, bastard of Burgundy was the illegitimate son of Philip the Good of Burgundy. He was known as le grand bâtard (the great bastard). He was legitimized by King Charles VIII in 1485.

=== Henri IV ===
Henri IV had many mistresses and illegitimate children. The children of Gabrielle d'Estrées are notable because the King may have signed a wedding agreement with their mother before her unexpected death in 1599.

- By Gabrielle d'Estrées
  - César, Duke of Vendôme, legitimized
  - Catherine Henriette, mademoiselle de Vendôme, legitimized
  - Alexandre, Chevalier de Vendôme, legitimized
- By Madame de Verneuil
  - Gaston Henri, Duke of Verneuil, legitimized
  - Gabrielle Angélique, mademoiselle de Verneuil, legitimized
- By Madame de Moret
  - Antoine, Count of Moret, legitimized
- By Charlotte des Essarts
  - Jeanne Baptiste, legitimized
  - Marie Henriette, legitimized

=== Louis XIV ===
Louis XIV had many mistresses and illegitimate children. Madame de Maintenon was their governess.

"The bastards", as they were called, were compared to mules, unnatural hybrids who should not reproduce. "No issue should come of such species," the king once said. Louis, nonetheless, found appropriate spouses for his illegitimate children.

As illegitimate children were considered impure, their mothers might attempt to purify them through pious behavior. Louise de La Vallière had six children by Louis XIV, including Marie Anne de Bourbon (1666–1739) and Louis de Bourbon (1667–1683). She repented by joining a Carmelite convent. There she wore a belt of iron spikes that cut into her flesh.

Church leaders denounced Madame de Montespan, Louis' best-known mistress, who had seven children by him. In 1675, Father Lécuyer refused to give her absolution. "Is this the Madame that scandalises all France?" he asked. "Go abandon your shocking life and then come throw yourself at the feet of the ministers of Jesus Christ."

The king's efforts to legitimize his illegitimate children showed his, "Olympian disdain for public opinion," according to one modern author. The edict of Marly, issued in July 1714, granted two of Louis' sons by Montespan the right to succeed to the French throne. This hugely unpopular decision led to a political crisis called the "bastard distortion" in 1714–1715. It was reversed by the Parliament of Paris in July 1717, after Louis had died.

- By Mademoiselle de La Vallière
  - Charles de La Baume Le Blanc
  - Marie Anne, mademoiselle de Blois, legitimized and married in the royal family
  - Louis, Count of Vermandois, legitimized
- By Madame de Montespan
  - Louis Auguste, Duke of Maine, legitimized and made dynast (1714-1715).
  - Louis César, Count of Vexin, legitimized
  - Louise Françoise, mademoiselle de Nantes, legitimized and married in the royal family
  - Louise Anne, mademoiselle de Tours, legitimized
  - Françoise Marie, mademoiselle de Blois, legitimized and married in the royal family
  - Louis Alexandre, Count of Toulouse, legitimized and made dynast (1714-1715)
- By Mademoiselle des Œillets
  - Louise de Maisonblanche

=== Louis XV ===
Like his great-grandfather, Louis XV had many mistresses and illegitimate children, but contrary to him, he never legitimized any of them.

- By Pauline Félicité de Mailly
  - Charles Emmanuel Marie Magdelon de Vintimille du Luc
- By Jeanne Perray:
  - Amélie Florimond de Norville
- By Marie-Louise O'Murphy
  - Agathe Louise de Saint-Antoine de Saint-André
  - Marguerite Victoire Le Normant de Flaghac.
- By Françoise de Chalus
  - Philippe Louis Marie Innocent Christophe Juste de Narbonne-Lara
  - Louis Marie Jacques Amalric de Narbonne-Lara
- By Marguerite Catherine Haynault
  - Agnès Louise de Montreuil
  - Anne Louise de La Réale
- By Lucie Madeleine d'Estaing
  - Agnès Lucie Auguste
  - Aphrodite Lucie Auguste
- By Anne Coppier de Romans
  - Louis Aimé de Bourbon, called the Abbot of Bourbon; he was the only one of the illegitimate children of Louis XV who was officially recognized.
- By Jeanne Louise Tiercelin de La Colleterie
  - Benoît Louis Le Duc

== Monaco ==
Prince Albert II of Monaco has two illegitimate children, Jazmin Grace Grimaldi and Alexandre Grimaldi-Coste.

== Portugal ==
King Peter I of Portugal had an illegitimate son, John, who became Grand Master of the Order of Avis, and following the childless death of his legitimate half-brother, King Ferdinand I of Portugal and the ensuing 1383–1385 Portuguese interregnum, he succeeded as King John I, founding the House of Avis that would rule Portugal for the next two centuries. John I had an illegitimate son, Afonso, who was named Duke of Braganza by his half-brother, the regent Peter, Duke of Coimbra. He thus founded the House of Braganza that in 1640 would successfully claim the Portuguese crown on the basis of this descent, and rule into the 20th century.

King Carlos I of Portugal allegedly had an illegitimate daughter who became one of the most famous and controversial royal bastards in the history of European royalty: Maria Pia of Saxe-Coburg and Braganza.

== Russia ==
Empress Catherine the Great (reigned 1762 to 1796) had an illegitimate child in 1762, Alexei Grigorievich Bobrinsky, who was born a few months before she took the throne. Catherine officially acknowledged him in a letter sent in 1781. Later, his half-brother Emperor Paul made him a count of the Russian Empire and promoted him to general-major. He married Baroness Anna Dorothea von Ungern-Sternberg and had issue that continues to this day.

== Spain ==
In 783, Mauregatus of Asturias, the illegitimate son of King Alfonso I of Asturias allegedly born to a Moorish serf, took the throne upon the death of his brother-in-law Silo of Asturias, reigning for about 5 years.

The will of Sancho III of Pamplona, who died in 1035, lands in the County of Aragon were left to his illegitimate son Ramiro, who would grow these holdings into the Kingdom of Aragon, and whose son Sancho Ramírez, became King of Pamplona. Ramiro's illegitimate son, also named Sancho Ramírez, was made Count of Ribagorza. King García Sánchez III of Pamplona, had an illegitimate son Sancho Garcés, and when King Alfonso the Battler died in 1134, grandsons of royal bastards Sancho Ramírez of Ribagorza and Sancho Garcés of Uncastillo were among the candidates for succession, with the latter being successful, becoming King García Ramírez of Navarre.

Alfonso VI, King of León and Castile, had a complex family born to multiple wives and mistresses, but only one son, Sancho, born to a fugitive Muslim mistress, Zaida of Seville. Sancho was named his father's heir in 1107, but was killed following a battle the next year. Alfonso's legitimate daughter Queen Urraca of León succeeded, but her rule in Portugal was challenged by her illegitimate half-sister, Theresa, Countess of Portugal, whose ambitions for independence were realized by her son, Afonso I of Portugal. Urraca herself, as queen regnant, would have two recognized illegitimate children by nobleman Pedro González de Lara, her main supporter against her former husband Alfonso the Battler.

In the 14th century, the English-allied King Peter of Castile would be overthrown by an alienated nobility in favor of his illegitimate half-brother, Henry of Trastámara, who thus became king as Henry II of Castile and was ancestor of the later royal family.

In the 16th century John of Austria (Spanish: Juan de Austria) was an illegitimate son of Holy Roman Emperor Charles V. In his last will of 1558, the Emperor officially recognized Juan as his son and put him to the service of his legitimate successor Philip II. He devoted his life to the service of his half-brother, King Philip II of Spain, and is best known for his role as the admiral of the Holy Alliance fleet at the Battle of Lepanto.

In 2003, Leandro Ruiz Moragas, an illegitimate son of King Alfonso XIII's, gained the right to call himself a prince.

== See also ==
- Colonial American bastardy laws
- Concubinage
- Consort
- Droit du seigneur
- Issue (genealogy)
- Legitimacy (family law)
- Primogeniture
- Royal descent
- Royal mistress
