= Bedroom =

Private room having at least one bed; used for rest or relaxation

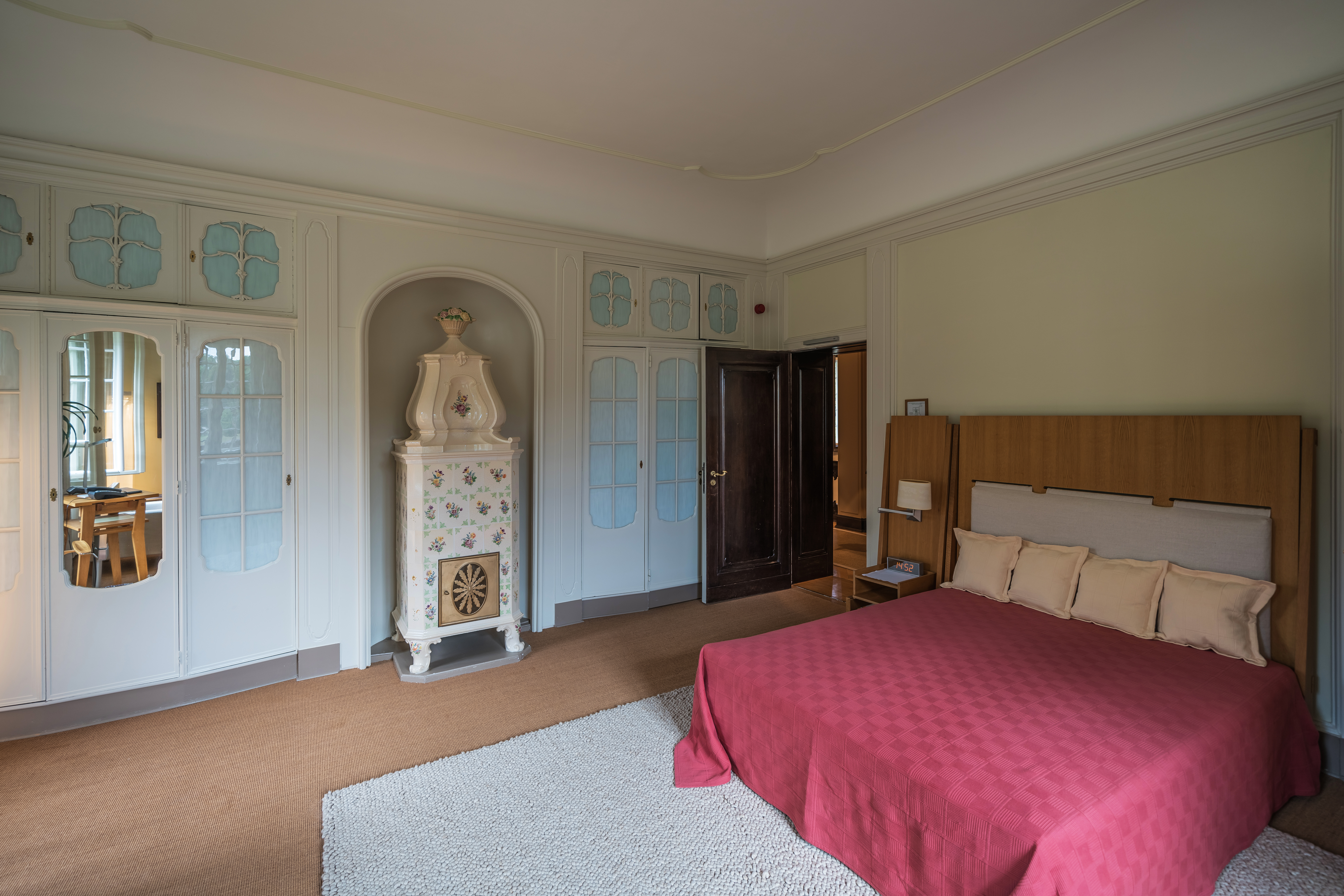
A bedroom in Germany

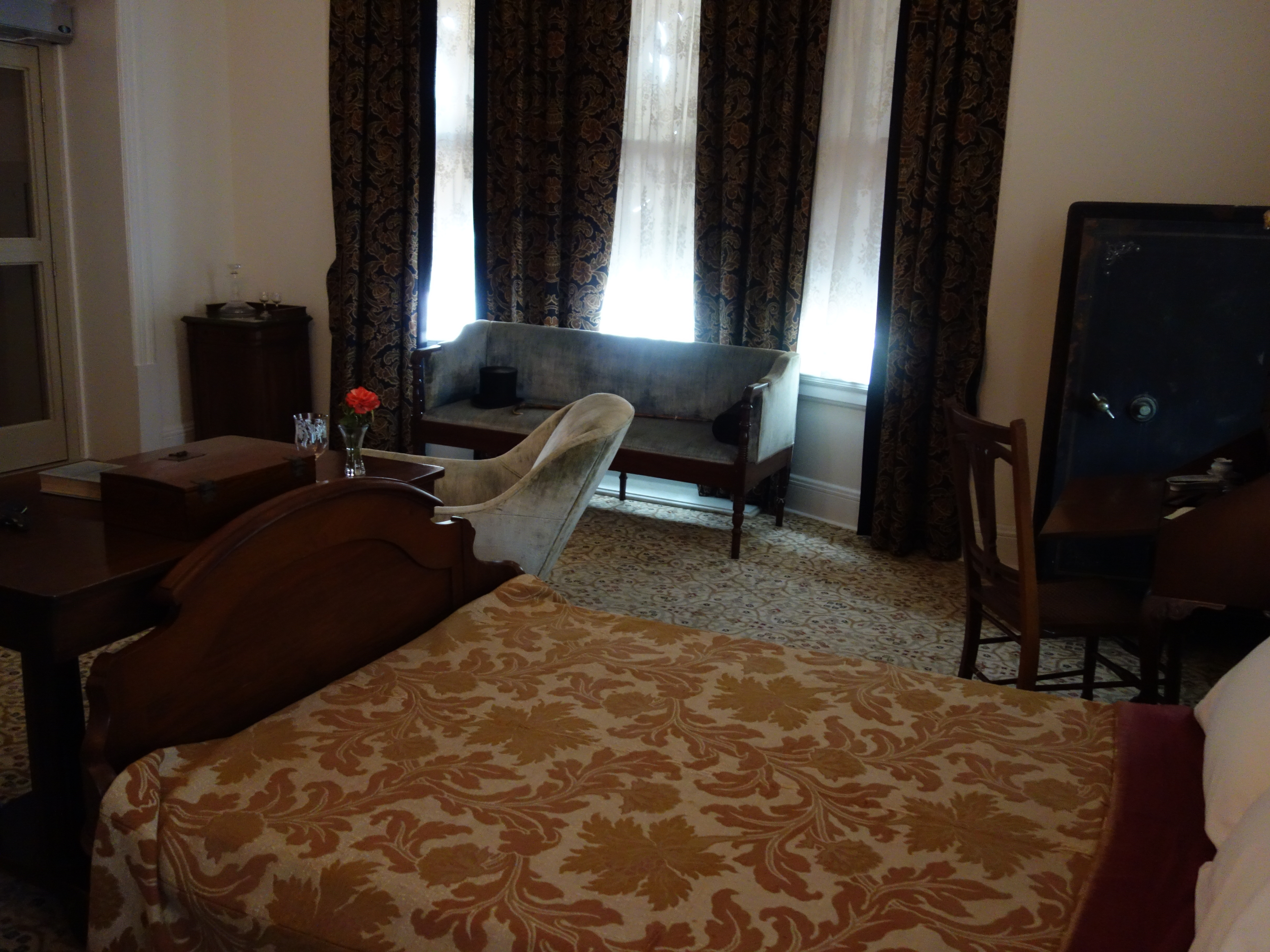
Bedroom in the Indian Mound Cottage at Jekyll Island

A bedroom or bedchamber is a room situated within a residential or accommodation unit, primarily used for sleeping. A typical Western bedroom contains as bedroom furniture one or two beds, a clothes closet, and bedside table and dressing table, both of which usually contain drawers. In dwellings with multiple stories, bedrooms are often on the upper floors. Beds range from a crib for an infant; a single or twin bed for a toddler, child, teenager or single adult; to bigger sizes like a full, double, queen, king or California king). Beds and bedrooms are often devised to create barriers to insects and vermin, especially mosquitoes, and to dampen or contain light or noise to aid sleep and privacy.

== History ==
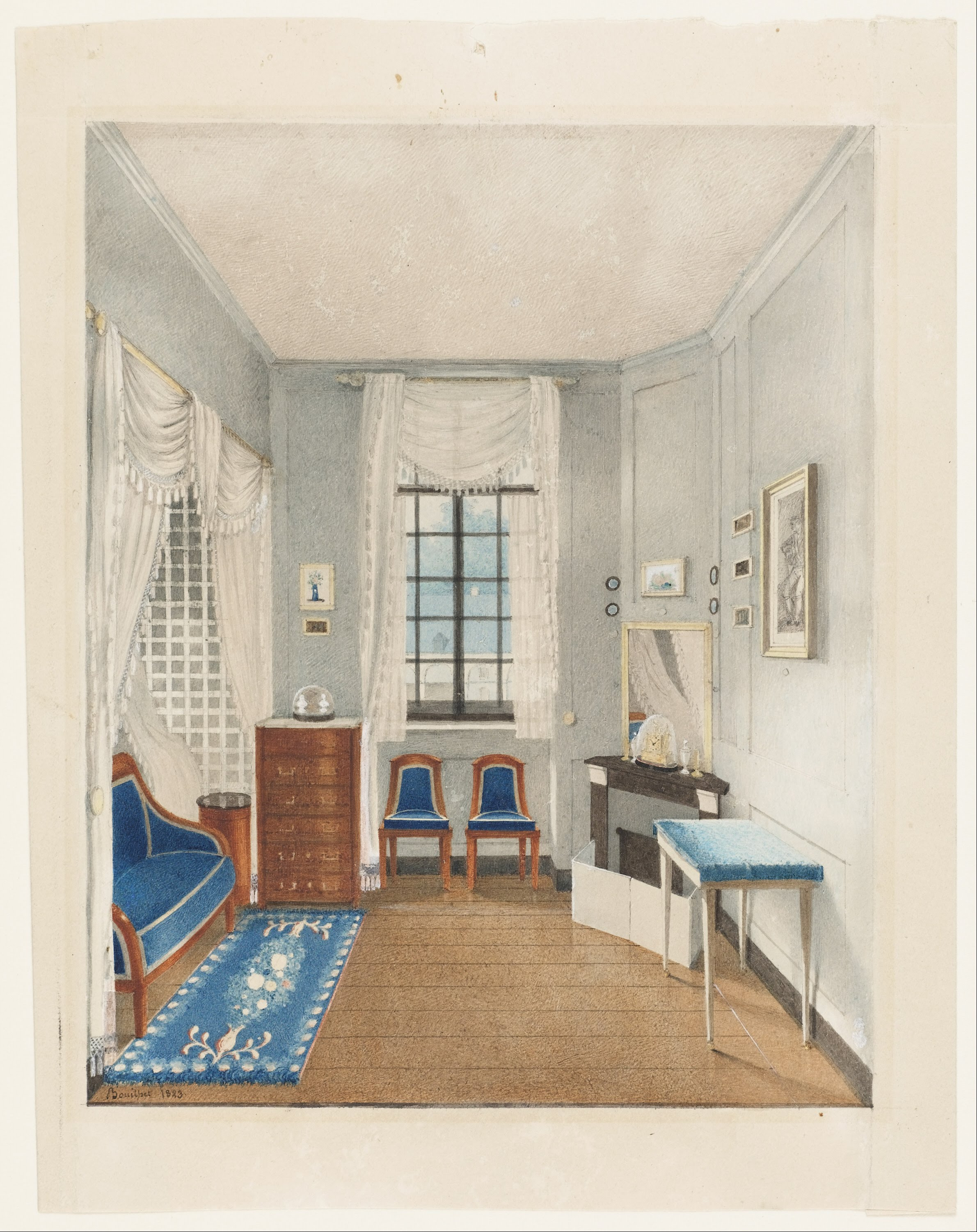
French bedroom, 1823

Bedroom in Arles, by Vincent van Gogh in October 1888, at the Van Gogh Museum of Amsterdam

In the 14th century, the lower class living in Medieval Europe slept on mattresses that were stuffed with hay and broom straws. Servants usually slept in various rooms, rolling up and putting away their bedding during the day. During the 16th century, mattresses stuffed with feathers started to gain popularity, with those who could afford them. The common person was doing well if he could buy a mattress after seven years of marriage. In the 18th century cotton and wool started to become more common.

The first coil spring mattress was not invented until 1871. The most common and most purchased mattress is the innerspring mattress, though a wide variety of alternative materials are available including foam, latex, wool, and even silk. The variety of firmness choices range from relatively soft to a rather firm mattress. A bedroom may have bunk beds if two or more people share a room. A chamber pot kept under the bed or in a nightstand was usual in the period before modern domestic plumbing and bathrooms in dwellings.

In larger Victorian houses it was common to have accessible from the bedroom a boudoir for the lady of the house and a dressing room for the gentleman. Attic bedrooms exist in some houses; since they are only separated from the outside air by the roof they are typically cold in winter and may be too hot in summer. The slope of the rafters supporting a pitched roof also makes them inconvenient. In houses where servants were living in they often used attic bedrooms.

== Furnishings ==
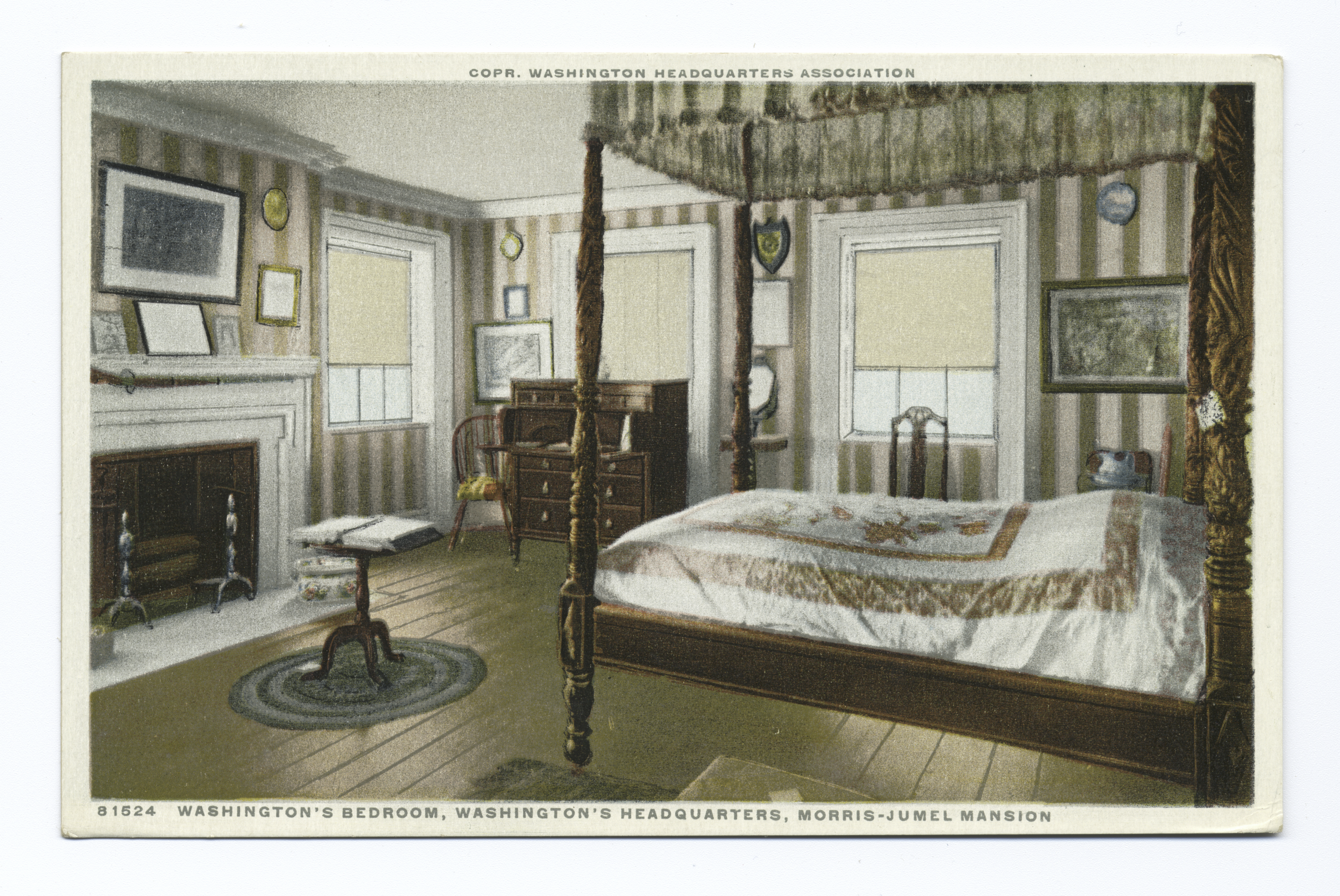
Bedroom from New York City

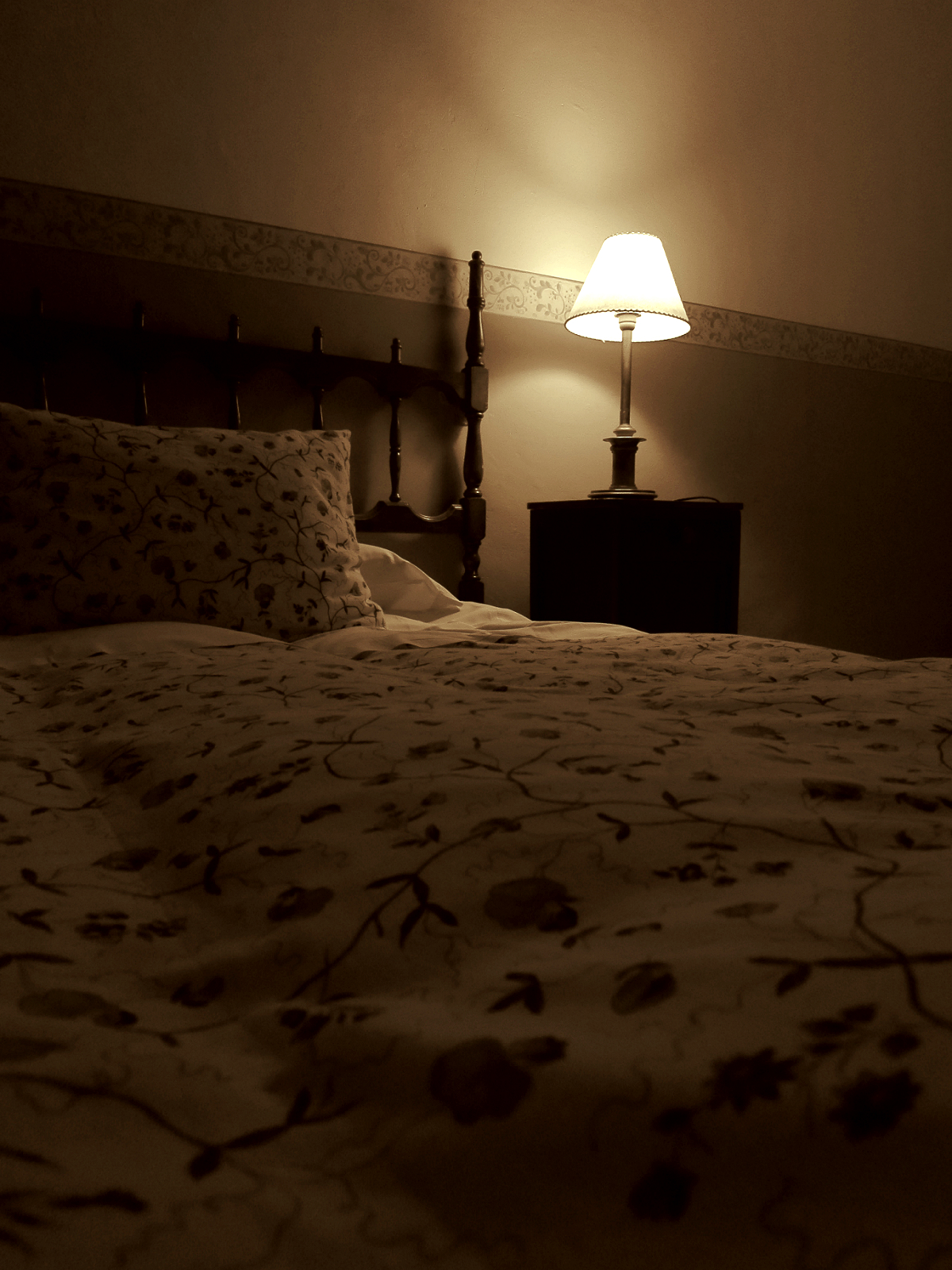
Bedroom at night in Puigcerdà (Cerdanya, Girona, Spain)

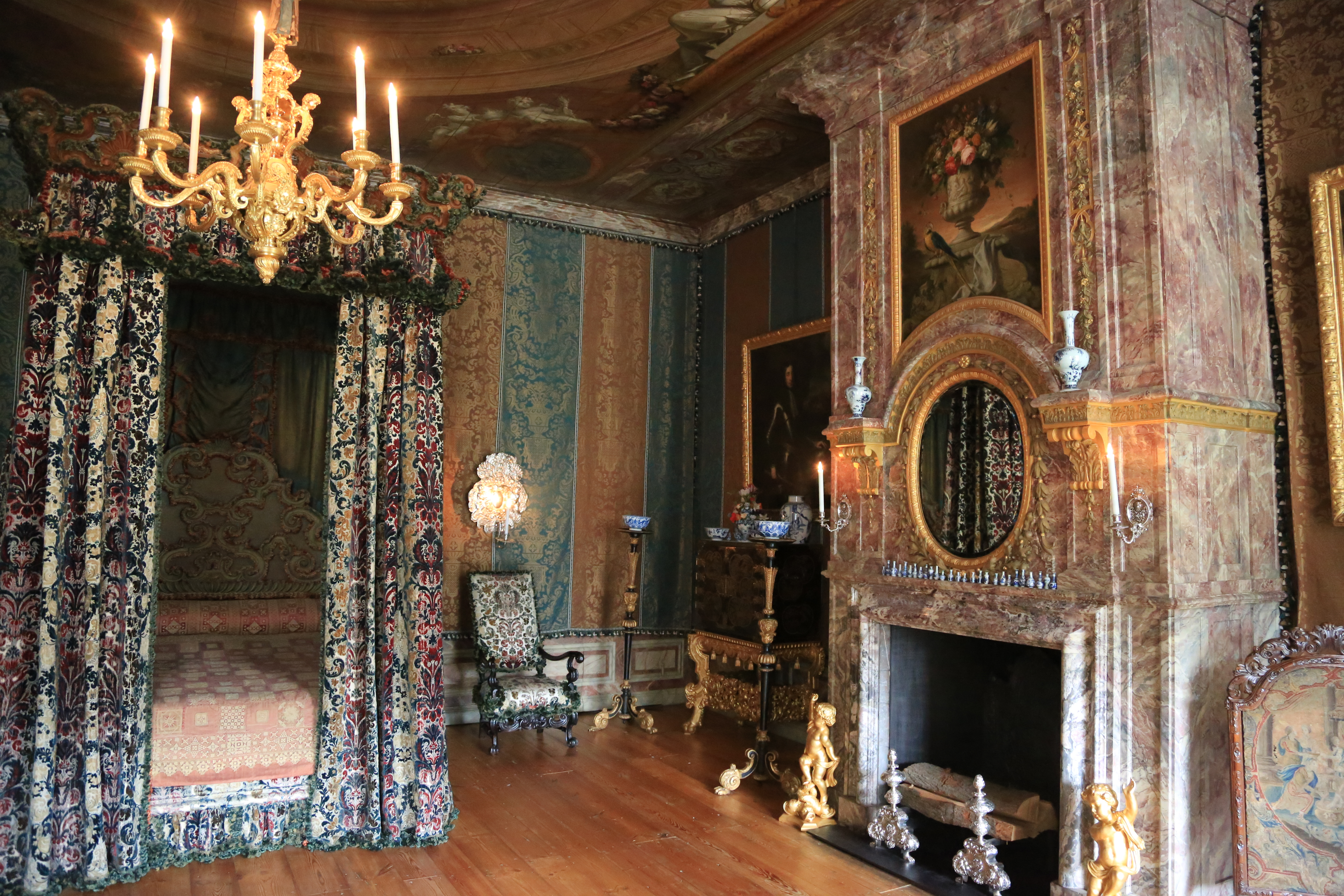
Queen Mary's bedroom in Het Loo Palace in Apeldoorn (the Netherlands)

Furniture and other items in bedrooms vary greatly, depending on taste, local traditions and the socioeconomic status of an individual. For instance, a master bedroom (also referred to as a "masters bedroom" in the Philippines) may include a bed of a specific size (double, king or queen-sized); one or more dressers (or perhaps, a wardrobe); a nightstand; one or more closets; and carpeting. Built-in closets are less common in Europe than in North America; thus there is greater use of freestanding wardrobes or armoires in Europe.

An individual's bedroom is a reflection of their personality, as well as social class and socioeconomic status, and is unique to each person. However, there are certain items that are common in most bedrooms. Mattresses usually have a bed set to raise the mattress off the floor and the bed often provides some decoration. There are many different types of mattresses.

Night stands are also popular. They are used to put various items on, such as an alarm clock or a small lamp. In the times before bathrooms existed in dwellings bedrooms often contained a washstand for tasks of personal hygiene. In the 2010s, having a television set in a bedroom is fairly common as well. 43% of American children from ages 3 to 4 have a television in their bedrooms. Along with television sets many bedrooms also have computers, video game consoles, and a desk to do work. In the late 20th century and early 21st century the bedroom became a more social environment and people started to spend a lot more time in their bedrooms than in the past.

Bedding used in northern Europe (especially in Scandinavia) is significantly different from that used in North America and other parts of Europe. In Japan futons are common.

In addition to a bed (or, if shared by two or more children, a bunk bed), a child's bedroom may include a small closet or dressers, a toy box or computer game console, bookcase or other items.

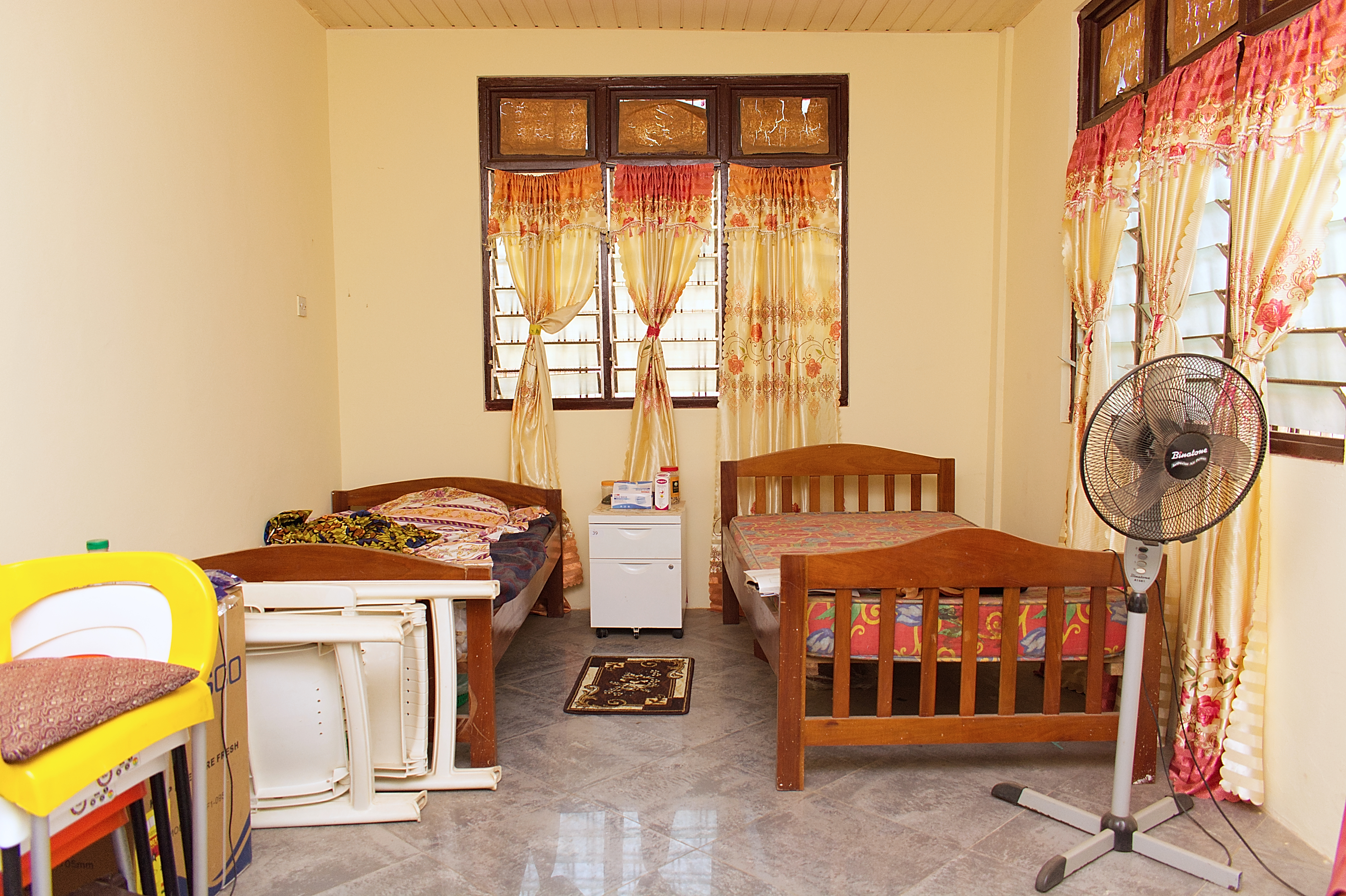
2 beds one room

== Modern bedrooms ==
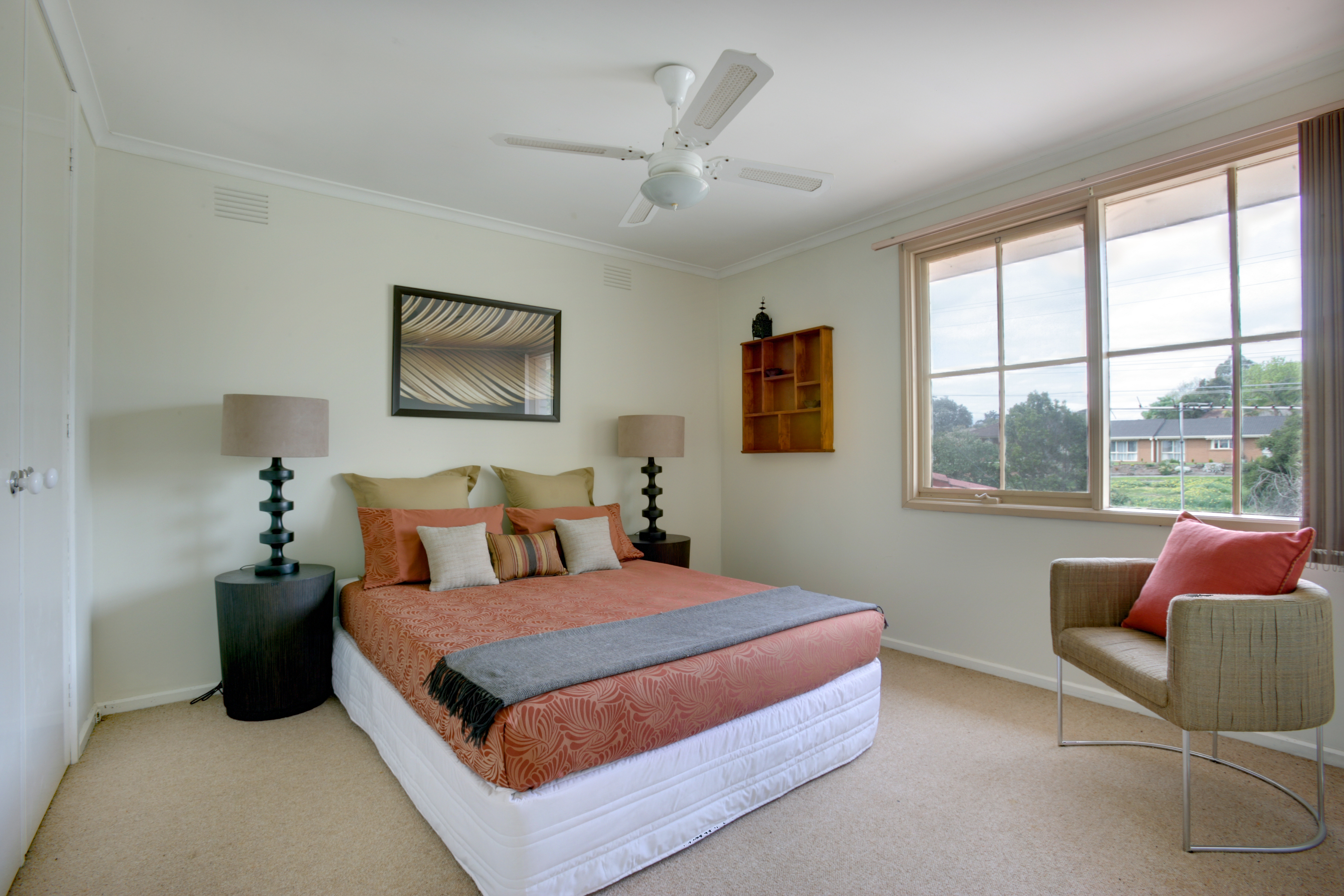
A modern Western bedroom in Australia

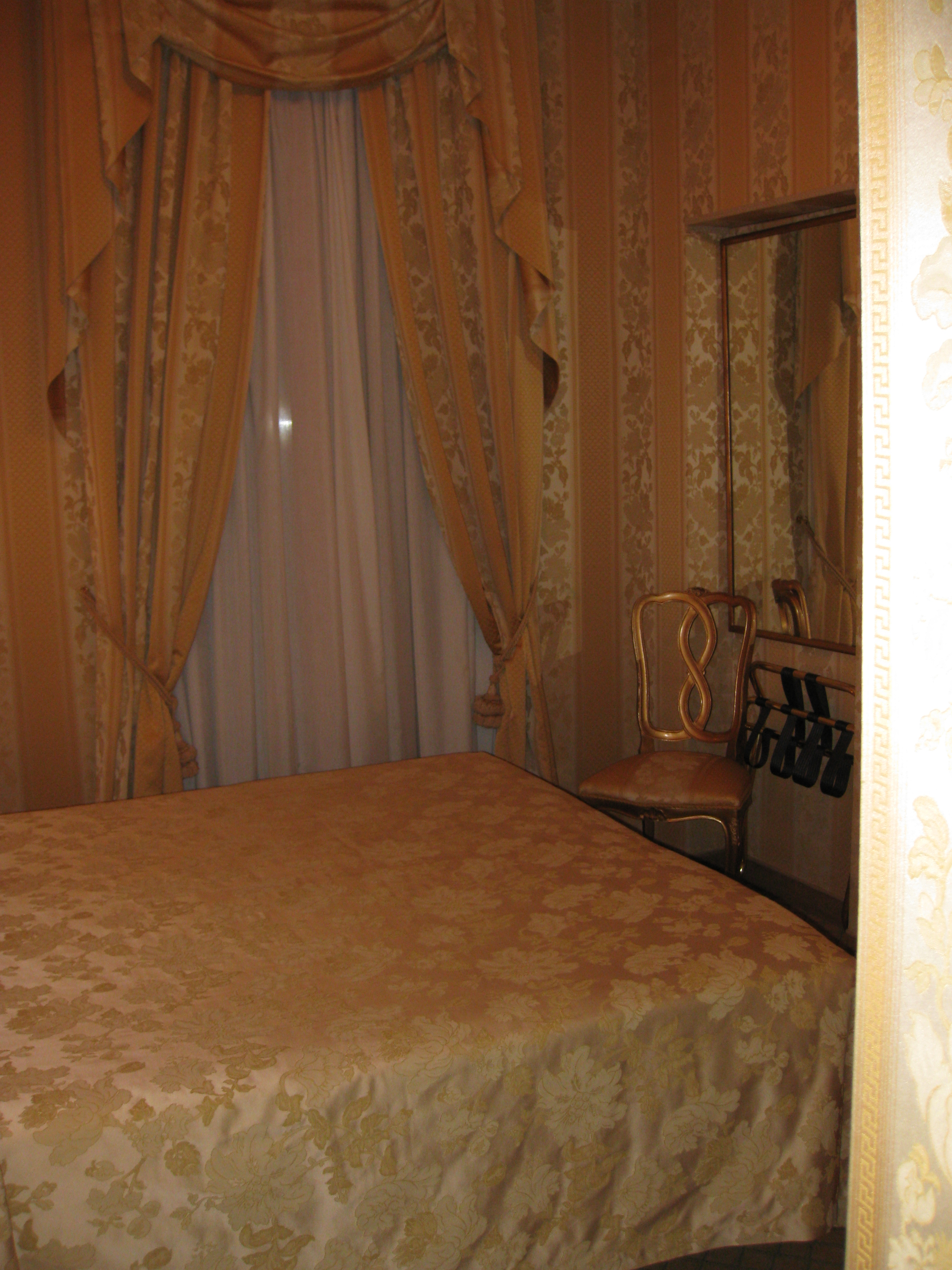
A hotel bedroom in Venice

Many houses in North America have at least two bedrooms—usually a master bedroom and one or more bedrooms for either children or guests.

There are basic features that a room must have in order to legally qualify as a bedroom such as a minimum size and ponts of egress. In many states, such as Alaska, and all other states, bedrooms are not required to have closets.

A closet by definition is a small space used to store things. In a bedroom, a closet is most commonly used for clothes and other small personal items that one may have. Walk in closets are more popular today and vary in size. However, in the past wardrobes have been the most prominent. A wardrobe is a tall rectangular shaped cabinet in which clothes can be stored or hung. Clothes are also kept in a dresser. Typically nicer clothes are kept in the closet because they can be hung up while leisure clothing and undergarments are stored in the dresser.

In buildings with multiple self-contained housing units (e.g., apartments), the number of bedrooms varies widely. While many such units have at least one bedroom—frequently, these units have at least two—some of these units may not have a specific room dedicated for use as a bedroom. (These units may be known by various names, including studio, efficiency, bedsit, and others.)

Sometimes, a master bedroom is connected to a dedicated bathroom, often called an ensuite or master bathroom.

== Culture ==
Bedrooms typically have a door for privacy (in some cases lockable from inside) and a window for ventilation. In larger bedrooms, a small desk and chair or an upholstered chair and a chest of drawers may also be used. In Western countries, some large bedrooms, called master bedrooms, may also contain a bathroom. Where space allows bedrooms may also have televisions and / or video players, and in some cases a personal computer.

== Around the world ==
=== Japan ===
In Japan, the notion of having a bedroom is much less important than it is in the West, especially as it pertains to having a private space for personal use. Indeed, having a unified house corresponds to having a unified family, a concept so important that areas are seldom personalized, even those pertaining to relationships. Everything is subject to the concept of primitive cohesion. This makes for flexibility in terms of the way various spaces are utilized: Each evening, the Japanese unroll their futon directly on their tatami mats, typically close to one another. They then put them away come morning in the oshiire. The unity of the household is also reinforced by the use of sliding partitions (shoji) lined with rice paper and insulating in every way.

Materially, the Japanese tatami room, as opposed to its Western counterpart (deemed The Western Room), has no door, bed, or even wall, making it barely detectable in space.

This room is typically situated towards the back of the home, close to the place dedicated to the family ancestors and opposite of the southern façade, the gardens, and the general exterior.

The second half of the twentieth century saw a considerable change in the bedroom style. Almost non-existent before World War Two, The Western Room continued to gain traction in new constructions to the point where there is a clear relationship between the age of a building and the presence of Western-style bedrooms. Cultural habits, however, have not shifted as rapidly.

In the most densely populated cities, there exists a type of hotel essentially consisting of stacks of individual rooms so cramped they hardly allow one to do more than lie down and sleep. These are called capsule hotels, and have spread to areas such as Singapore and Taiwan.

== See also ==
- Cabin (ship)
- Chambre du Roi
- Comforter
- Laundry room
- Nursery (room)
