= Michel Baron =

French actor and playwright

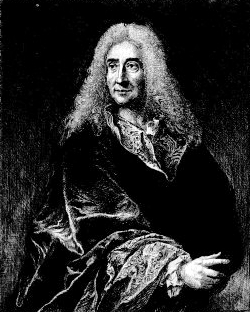
- Portrait by François Courboin
- Born: 8 October 1653; Paris, France
- Died: 22 December 1729 (aged 76); Paris, France
- Awards: Sociétaires of the Comédie-Française

Michel Baron (8 October 1653 – 22 December 1729) was a French actor and playwright.

== Life ==
His family name was originally Boyron. His father and mother were leading players, André Boiron and Jeanne Auzoult. He was born in Paris. He was orphaned at age 9, and joined the child company Petits Comédiens Dauphins at age 12, becoming its brightest star. Baron came to the notice of Molière, joined his troupe, and eventually became his protégé. He left the troupe after a conflict with Molière's wife, Armande Béjart, but rejoined in 1670. He played the role of Domitien in Pierre Corneille's Tite et Bérénice and played in Corneille's Psyché. He stayed with the troupe until Molière's death in 1673, when he joined the troupe at the Hotel de Bourgogne. This troupe merged with another in 1680 to become the Comédie-Française.

With Comédie-Française, Baron was the undisputed master of the French stage until his retirement in 1691. He created many of the leading roles in Jean Racine's plays, and in his own L'Homme à bonnes fortunes (1686), his most popular play, and La Coquette. He also wrote Les Enlèvements and Le Debauche, and translated and acted in two plays by Terence.

After retiring in 1691, Baron re-appeared in 1720 at the Palais Royal, and was very active. During his last years on stage, he regularly performed with Adrienne Lecouvreur. He died on 22 December 1729.

Barons's son Étienne Michel Baron (1676–1711) was also an actor. Etienne's son and two daughters all acted with the Comédie-Française.
