= Jeanne Auzoult =

French stage actress

Jeanne Auzoult, stage name Mademoiselle Baron (c. 1625–1662), was a French stage actress.

She was the daughter of actors Jean Auzoult and Jeanne de Creve, and married André Boiron (d. 1655) in 1641. She was the mother of the famous actor Michel Baron.

She was engaged in the Grands Comediens (Comédiens du Roi) at the Hôtel de Bourgogne in 1641–1662.

During her career, she was a successful, well known and popular actor, though her popularity has been attributed to her beauty rather than to her artistic abilities. According to Tallemant, Mlle Baron was "very pretty, not a marvelous actress, but a success thanks to her beauty".

She was described as "an outstanding interpreter of boys' parts", and was admired by Pierre Corneille.

She worked until her death and was replaced by the famous Alix Faviot, who was engaged in 1662 to replace her.
