= Levee (ceremony) =

Morning reception held by a sovereign or other high-ranking person

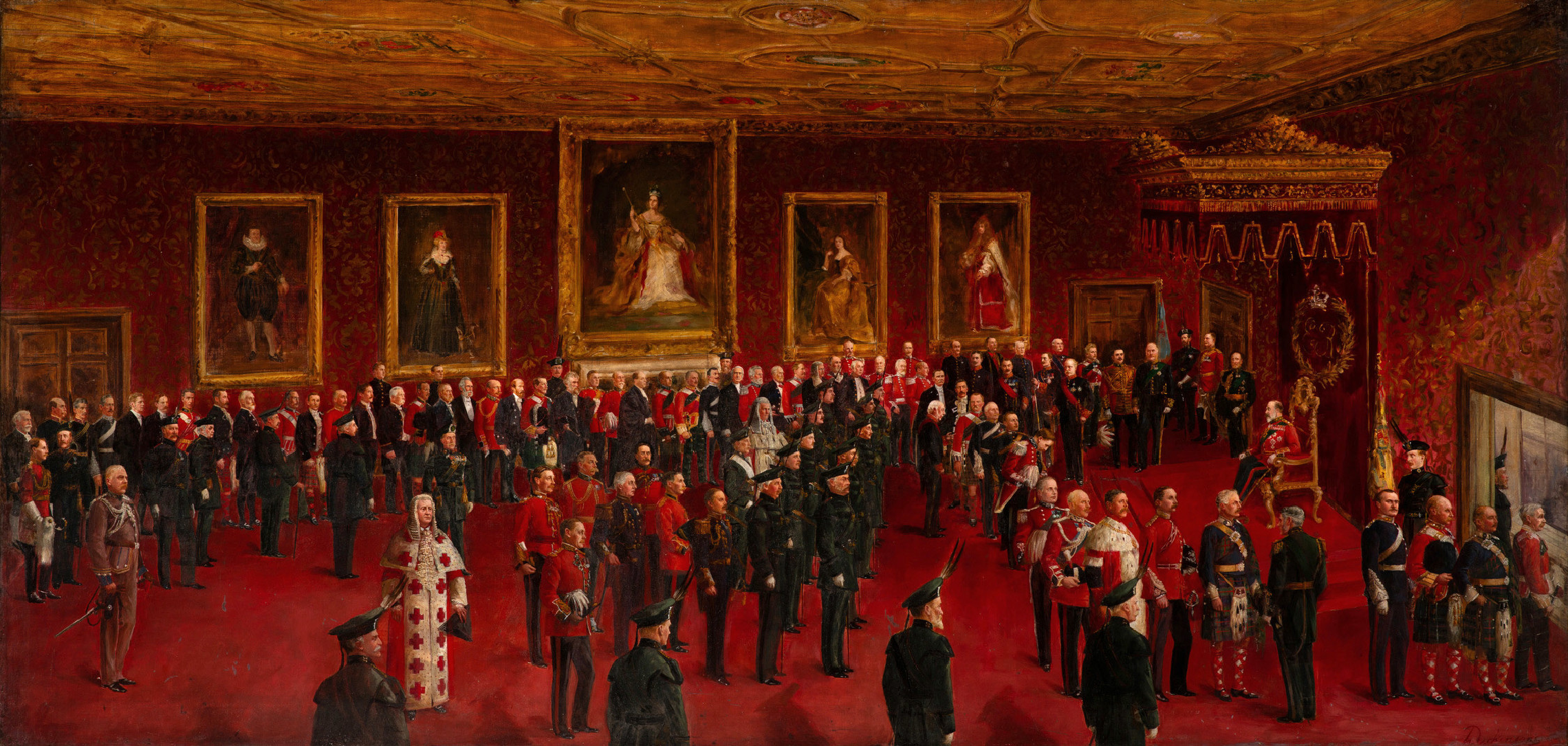
A Levée underway in the Palace of Holyroodhouse, 1903. King Edward VII is seated on the throne, the Royal Company of Archers stand guard.

The levee (from the French word lever, meaning "getting up" or "rising") was traditionally a daily moment of intimacy and accessibility to a monarch or leader, as he got up in the morning. It started out as a royal custom, but in British America it came to refer to a reception by the sovereign's representative, which continues to be a tradition in Canada with the New Year's levee; in the United States a similar gathering was held by several presidents.

== History ==
=== France ===
In Einhard's Life of Charlemagne, the author recounts the Emperor's practice, when he was dressing and putting on his shoes, to invite his friends to come in and, in case of a dispute brought to his attention, "he would order the disputants to be brought in there and then, hear the case as if he were sitting in tribunal and pronounce a judgement."

By the second half of the sixteenth century, it had become a formal event, requiring invitation. In 1563 Catherine de' Medici wrote in advice to her son, the King of France, to do as his father (Henry II) had done and uphold the practice of lever. Catherine describes that Henry II allowed his subjects, from nobles to household servants, to come in while he dressed. She states this pleased his subjects and improved their opinion of him.

This practice was raised to a ceremonial custom at the court of King Louis XIV. In the court etiquette that Louis formalised, the set of extremely elaborate conventions was divided into the grand lever, attended by the full court in the gallery outside the king's bedchamber, and the petit lever that transpired in degrees in the king's chamber, where only a very select group might serve the king as he rose and dressed. In fact, the king had often risen early and put in some hours hunting before returning to bed for the start of the lever. Louis's grandson, King Philip V of Spain, and his queen typically spent all morning in bed, as reported by Saint-Simon, to avoid the pestering by ministers and courtiers that began with the lever.

The king's retiring ceremony proceeded in reverse order and was known as the coucher.

The successors of Louis XIV were not as passionate about the monarch's daily routine and, over time, the frequency of the lever and coucher decreased, much to the dismay of their courtiers.

=== Great Britain ===
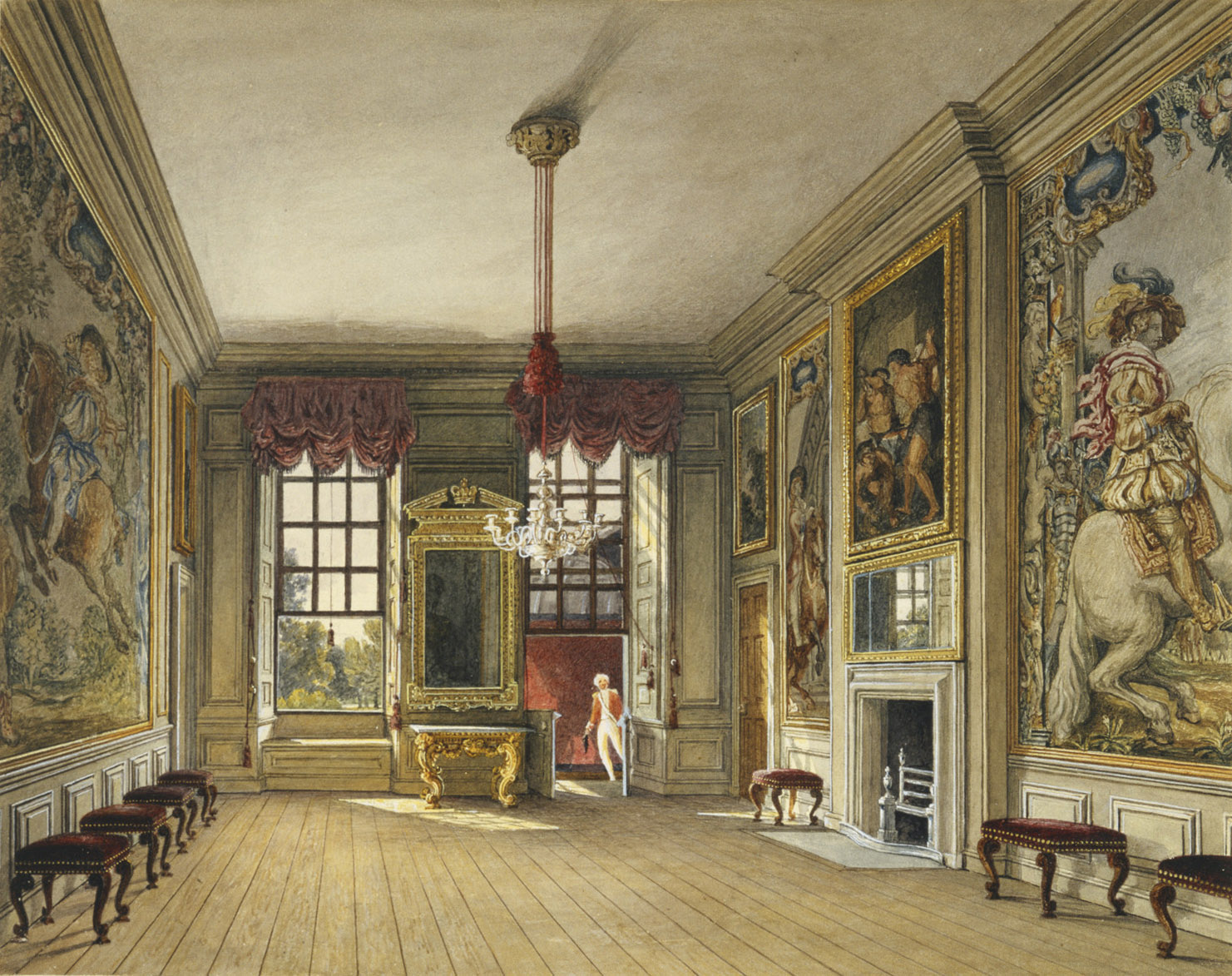
Charles Wild (1816) St James's Palace, Queen's Levee Room

When the court of Charles II of England adopted the custom, first noted as an English usage in 1672, it was called a levée. In the 18th century, as the fashionable dinner hour was incrementally moved later into the afternoon, the morning reception of the British monarch, attended only by gentlemen, was shifted back towards noon.

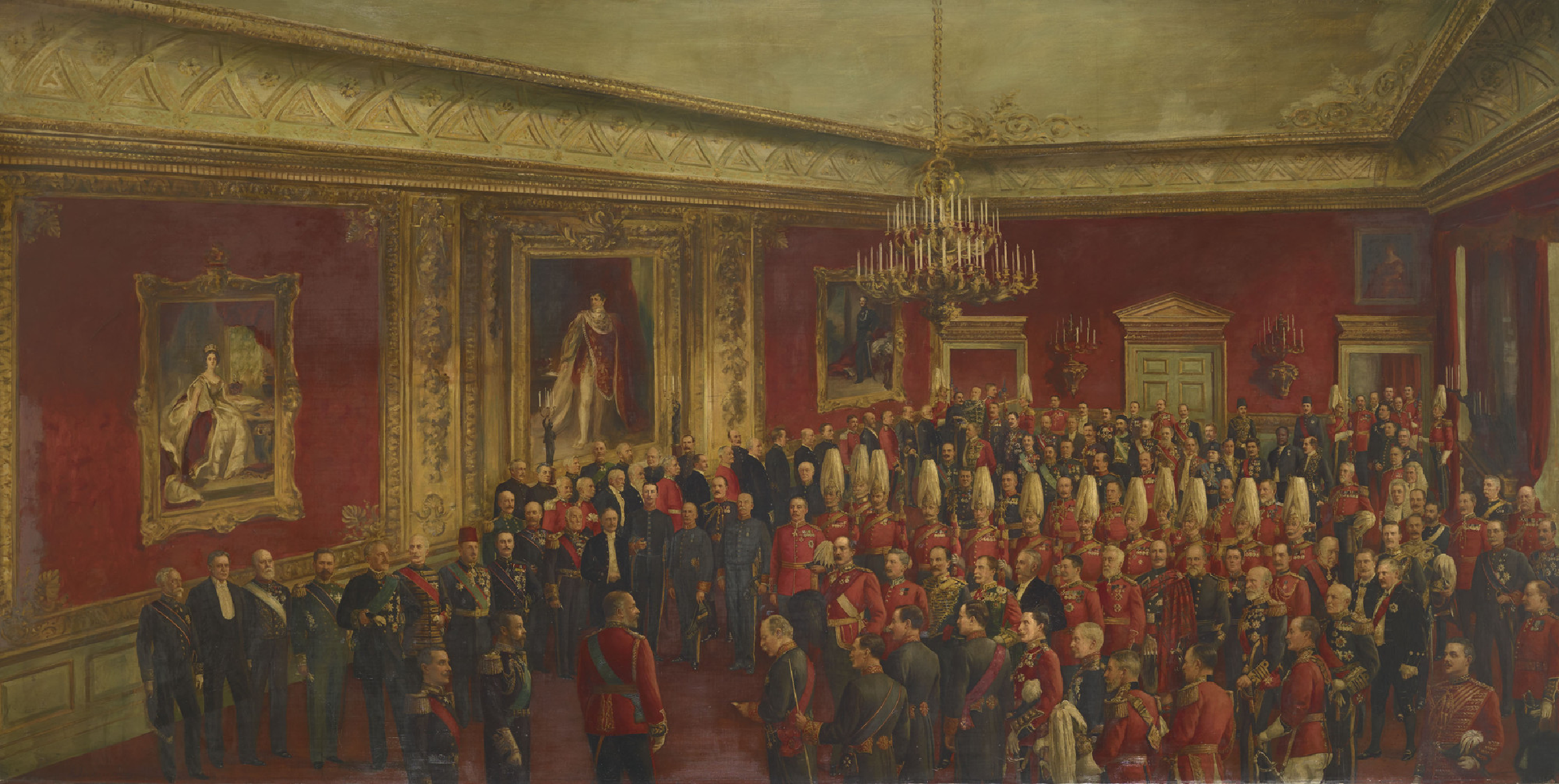
King Edward VII's first levee, held in the Throne Room of St James's Palace. The King stands in the foreground, with the Prince of Wales and Prince Carl of Denmark to his left.

The practice of holding court levées was continued by the British monarchy until 1939. These took the form of a formal reception at St James's Palace at which officials, diplomats, and military officers of all three armed services, were presented individually to the sovereign. A form of civil uniform known as Levée dress was worn by those entitled to it, or else naval or military uniform, or court dress. Participants formed a queue in the Throne Room before stepping forward when their names and ranks were called. Each then bowed to the king who was seated on a dais with male members of his family, officials of the Royal Household and senior officers behind him.

==== Levees in the British Empire and Commonwealth ====
Levée ceremonies were held by regal representatives of the British Empire, such as the Viceroy of India, the Lord Lieutenant of Ireland, governors general and state/provincial governors/lieutenant governors. The ceremonial event continues to be held in a number of Commonwealth countries. The New Year's levee is still held on New Year's Day in Canada, by the Governor General of Canada, the lieutenant governors, the Canadian Armed Forces, and various municipalities across the country.

=== United States ===
By the 1760s, the custom was being copied by the colonial governors in British America, but was abandoned in the United States following the American Revolutionary War. Beginning in 1789, President George Washington and First Lady Martha Washington held weekly public gatherings and receptions at the presidential mansion that were called levees. Designed to give the public access to the president and to project a dignified public image of the presidency, they were continued by John and Abigail Adams, but not by Thomas Jefferson. English writer Harriet Martineau, after witnessing a White House levee during the second term of Andrew Jackson's presidency, remarked on how egalitarian the levee was in every respect but one:

I saw one ambassador after another enter with his suite; the Judges of the Supreme Court; the majority of the members of both Houses of Congress; and intermingled with these, the plainest farmers, storekeepers, and mechanics, with their primitive wives and simple daughters. Some looked merry; some looked busy; but none bashful. I believe there were three thousand persons present. There was one deficiency,—one drawback, as I felt at the time. There were no persons of colour ... Every man of colour who is a citizen of the United States has a right to as free an admission as any other man; and it would be a dignity added to the White House if such were seen there.

Abraham Lincoln held a levee on New Year's Eve 1862.

== Louis XIV's lever ==
The ceremony at Versailles has been described in detail by Louis de Rouvroy, duc de Saint-Simon. Louis XIV was a creature of habit and the inflexible routine that tired or irritated his heirs served him well. Wherever the king had actually slept, he was discovered sleeping in the close-curtained state bed standing in its alcove, which was separated from the rest of the chambre du roi by a gilded balustrade. He was woken at eight o'clock by his head valet de chambre—Alexandre Bontemps held this post for most of the reign—who alone had slept in the bedchamber. The chief physician, the chief surgeon and Louis' childhood nurse, as long as she lived, all entered at the same time, and the nurse kissed him. The night chamberpot was removed.

=== Grande entrée ===
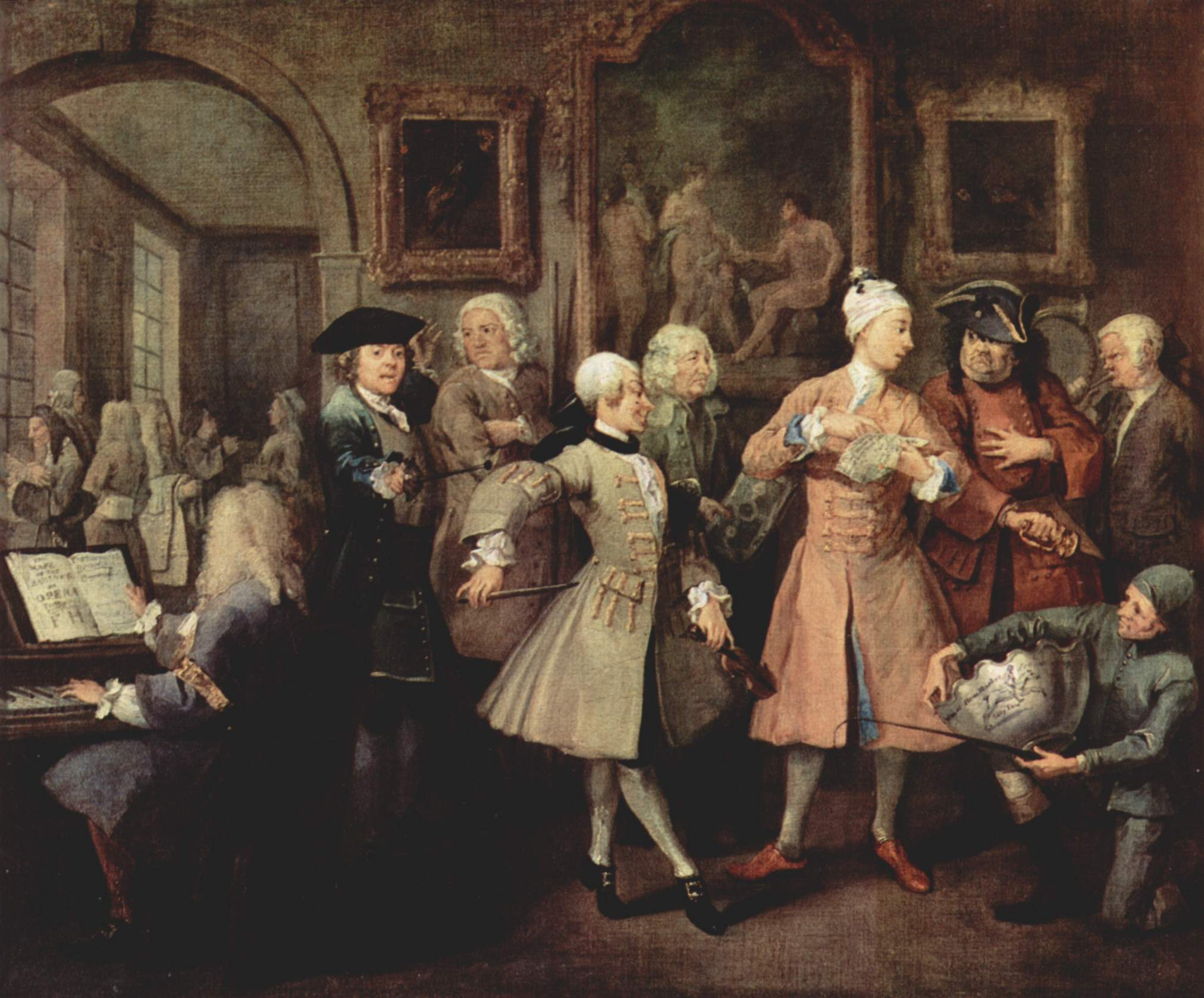
The second scene of William Hogarth's A Rake's Progress (1732–33) showing the wealthy Tom at his morning levée in London, attended by musicians and other hangers-on all dressed in expensive costumes. Surrounding Tom from left to right: a music master at a harpsichord, who was supposed to represent George Frideric Handel; a fencing master; a quarterstaff instructor; a dancing master with a violin; a landscape gardener Charles Bridgeman; an ex-soldier offering to be a bodyguard; a bugler of a fox hunt club. At lower right is a jockey with a silver trophy.

Then the curtains of the bed were drawn once again and, at a quarter past eight, the Grand Chamberlain was called, bringing with him the nobles who had the privilege of the grande entrée, a privilege that could be purchased, subject to the king's approval, but which was restricted in Louis' time to the nobles. The King remained in bed, in his nightshirt and a short wig. The Grand Chamberlain of France or, in his absence, the Chief Gentleman of the Bedchamber presented holy water to the king from a vase that stood at the head of the bed and the king's morning clothes were laid out. First, the Master of the Bedchamber and the First Servant, both high nobles, pulled the king's nightshirt over his head, one grasping each sleeve. The Grand Chamberlain presented the day shirt which, according to Saint-Simon, had been shaken out and sometimes changed, because the king perspired freely. This was a moment for any of those with the privilege of the grande entrée to have a swift private word with the king, which would have been carefully rehearsed beforehand to express a request as deferentially as possible while also being as brief as possible. The King was given a missal and the gentlemen retired into the adjoining chambre du conseil (the "council chamber") while there was a brief private prayer for the King.

=== Première entrée ===
When the King had them recalled, now accompanied by those who had the lesser privilege of the première entrée, his process of dressing began. Louis preferred to dress himself "for he did almost everything himself, with address and grace", Saint-Simon remarked. The King was handed a dressing-gown, and a mirror was held for him, for he had no toilet table like ordinary gentlemen. Every other day the King shaved himself. Now, other privileged courtiers were admitted, a few at a time, at each stage, so that, as the King was putting on his shoes and stockings, "everyone" – in Saint-Simon's view – was there. This was the entrée de la chambre, which included the king's readers and the director of the Menus Plaisirs, that part of the royal establishment in charge of all preparations for ceremonies, events and festivities, to the last detail of design and order. At the entrée de la chambre were admitted the Grand Aumônier and the Marshal of France and the king's ministers and secretaries. A fifth entrée now admitted ladies for the first time, and a sixth entrée admitted, from a privileged position at a cramped backdoor, the king's children, legitimate and illegitimate indiscriminately – in scandalous fashion Saint-Simon thought – and their spouses.

The crowd in the chambre du Roi can be estimated from Saint-Simon's remark of the King's devotions, which followed: the King knelt at his bedside "where all the clergy present knelt, the cardinals without cushions, all the laity remaining standing".

The King then passed into the cabinet where all those who possessed any court office attended him. He then announced what he expected to do that day and was left alone with those among his favourites of the royal children born illegitimately (whom he had publicly recognised and legitimated) and a few favourites, with the valets. These were less pressing moments to discuss projects with the King, who parcelled out his attention with strict regard for the current standing of those closest to him.

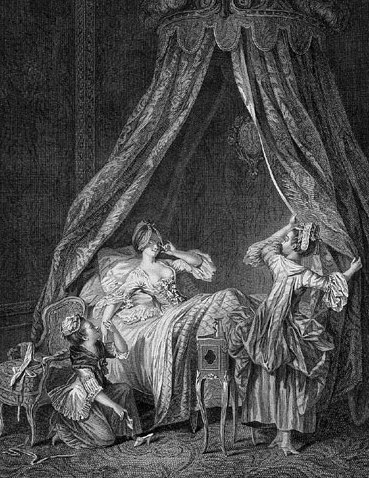
Le Lever, engraving by Louis Romanet (1742–1810), after Sigmund Freudenberg (1745–1801)

=== Grand lever ===
With the entry of the King into the Grande Galerie, where the rest of the court awaited him, the petit lever was finished, and with the grand lever the day was properly begun, as the king proceeded to daily Mass, sharing brief words as he progressed and even receiving some petitions. It was of these occasions that the King habitually remarked, in refusing a favour asked for some noble, "We never see him", meaning that he did not spend enough time at Versailles, where Louis wanted to keep the nobility penned up, to prevent them interesting themselves in politics.

== For the aristocracy ==
Among the aristocracy, the levée could also become a crowded and social occasion, especially for women, who liked to put off the donning of their uncomfortable formal clothes, and whose hair and perhaps make-up needed prolonged attention. There is a famous depiction of the levée of an 18th-century Viennese lady of the court in Richard Strauss's later opera Der Rosenkavalier, where she has her hair dressed while surrounded by a disorderly crowd of tradesmen touting for work or payment, and other petitioners, followed by a visit from a cousin. The second scene of William Hogarth's A Rake's Progress shows a male equivalent in 1730s London.

In the French engraving Le Lever after Freudenberg, of the 1780s, gentle social criticism is levelled at the lady of the court; that she slept without unlacing her stays, apparently, perhaps can be seen as artistic licence. Her maids dress her with deference, while the wallclock under the hangings of her lit à la polonaise appears to read noon.

== In popular culture ==
In Sofia Coppola's Marie Antoinette (2006), the levée of the French queen during the reign of Louis XVI is represented. In Maïwenn's Jeanne du Barry (2023), the levée of the French king during the reign of Louis XV is represented.
