= Alexandre Bontemps =

French nobleman and head valet of Louis XIV

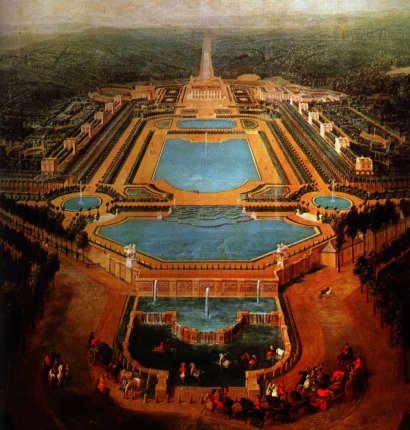
The Chateau of Marly, Louis's holiday home; one of Bontemps's responsibilities

Alexandre Bontemps (French pronunciation: [alɛksɑ̃dʁ bɔ̃tɑ̃]; 1626–1701) was the valet of King Louis XIV and a powerful figure at the court of Versailles, respected and feared for his exceptional access to the King. He was the second of a sequence of five Bontemps to hold the position of Premier valet de la Chambre du Roi ("First valet of the king's bedchamber") in uninterrupted succession between 1643 and 1766, when an early death, leaving no successor, broke the line. There were four head or Premier valets de chambre, of whom Bontemps became the most senior in 1665, and thirty-two valets.

== Life ==
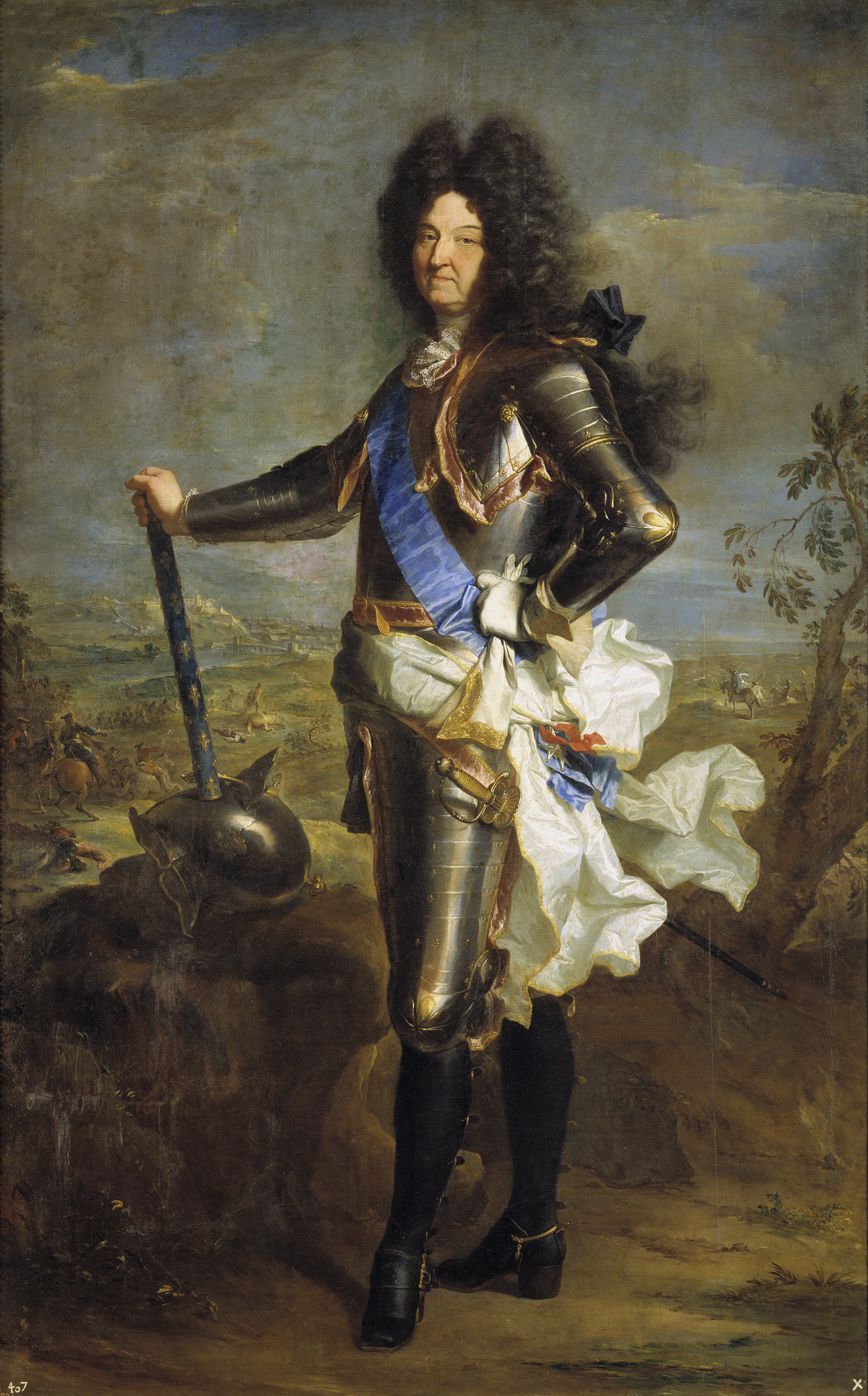
Louis XIV by Hyacinthe Rigaud

His father, Jean Baptiste Bontemps (1590–1659), had been surgeon to Louis XIII before becoming a Premier Valet in 1643. Alexandre succeeded him on his death in 1659, dying in office in 1701, by which time he was a count and marquis, holding several key offices controlling both the palaces and towns of Versailles and Marly, the Swiss Guard who guarded the King and his palaces, and the household of the Dauphin. He was thus a key figure in maintaining the security of the King, and managing his household. The Governorships of Versailles and Marly had been given to him in 1665 after the death of Jérôme Blouin (1610-1665), then the senior head-valet, and passed to Blouin's son in turn when Bontemps died. He was also a member of the Conseil du Roi (the Royal Council) and held a senior rank in the chivalric Order of Saint Lazarus.

He seems to have been an amiable figure, entirely devoted to Louis, who in turn trusted him as he did few others. He was twelve years older than the King. He was one of a small handful of witnesses to the secret second marriage of Louis to Madame de Maintenon. Saint-Simon speaks of "royal coaches (the kind without armorial bearings on the harness, such as Bontemps used for the King's private missions)" and says that "all the secret orders, the private audiences, the sealed letters to and from the King, in fact all the mysteries passed through his hands". Saint-Simon anecdotes have him arranging the marriage to an obscure country nobleman of an illegitimate daughter of Louis who, unlike many, he did not choose to acknowledge officially, and, in Louis's earlier years, leading a minor mistress enveloped in a cloak up the back stairs to the King's study for her assignation; the king having put the key on the outside of the door.

He emerges better than most from the Memoirs of Saint-Simon, whose father had been a friend of Bontemps. Saint-Simon asked him for advice on important issues, using him sparingly. The memoirist Choisy wrote that part of his success with Louis came from never asking him for favours, although Saint-Simon says that he "loved procuring favours solely for the pleasure of it ... great numbers of people, some of them highly placed, owed their fortunes to him, and he was modest almost to the point of breaking with them if they so much as mentioned it". The two statements are not incompatible, as Bontemps was in a position to ask favours from ministers and other powerbrokers. He says Bontemps was "rough and brusque in manner, yet respectful and always in his place.... His only skill lay in serving his master, and he was wholly intent on that... [he had been] influential for the past fifty years, and with the Court at his feet." He once greatly amused Louis, when asked how his wife was, by "replying mechanically with a shrug".

He used the Swiss Guards stationed around the Palaces and gardens to report on the behaviour of courtiers, including their church attendance, as well as political and sexual intrigues. As Intendant or Governor of Versailles, his control extended to the whole town outside the palaces, where many courtiers had houses.

== Premier valet ==
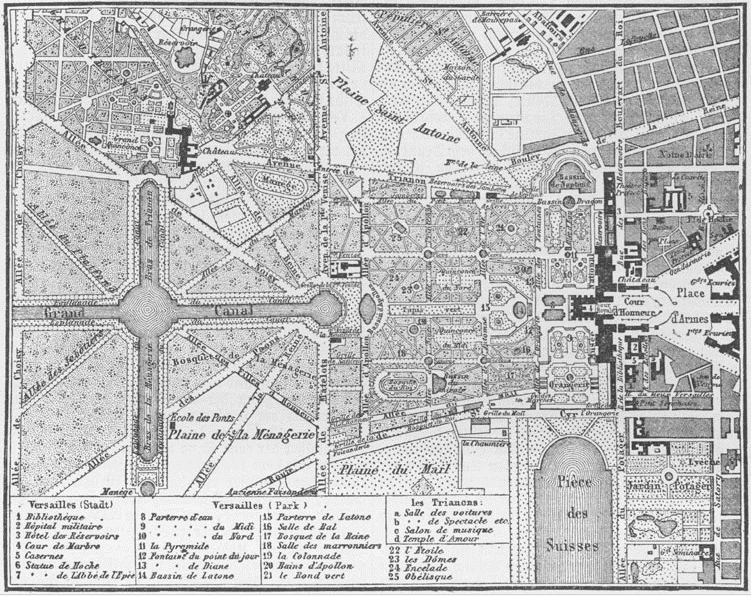
Plan of the Chateau de Versailles, in Bontemps' charge

The office of head valet dated back to a historically unwise complaint some generations back by the Gentlemen of the Bedchamber, always great nobles, against the more menial aspects of the role. Once established, the valets expanded in number and importance, somewhat at the Gentlemen's expense. One of their number was always a few steps from the King wherever he went, and the four Premiers, rotating quarterly, were alone able to, and presumably did, sleep at the foot of the royal bed.

In addition one of the ordinary valets was en poste by the King's bed all day, inside the balustrade that separated it, like an altar communion-rail, from the rest of the room. In the morning Levée and evening Coucher ceremonies, the Grand Chamberlain of France and Premier valet did the work, whilst the First Gentleman of the bedchamber (rotating annually among the four holders) had "the command of the room" (le commandement de la chambre). However, Saint-Simon explains carefully that if the First Gentleman of the year was absent, the Premier valet of the quarter was en commande of the ceremony, attended daily by about a hundred of the greatest courtiers – a significant point of prestige.

== Private life ==
Apart from a large apartment in the palace, and a separate house in Versailles, Bontemps had a "hôtel particulier" (townhouse) on the Île Saint-Louis in the centre of Paris, with thirty rooms and a staff of twelve. According to Saint-Simon, he copied his master with a secret second marriage to the mother of La Roche, head-valet to Louis's grandson, Philip V of Spain. The children of his first marriage married very well, and two generations later a Bontemps married an illegitimate son of the last Prince of Conti, a cadet branch of the Royal Family. Others married into the largest banking families in France. There is a portrait of the Comtesse de La Châtre, daughter of Louis XV's Bontemps head valet, by Elisabeth Vigée-Lebrun in the Metropolitan Museum of Art in New York, dated 1789, the last year of the Ancien Regime.

== In modern memory ==
- The City of Versailles has a "Rue Alexandre Bontemps".
- Bontemps, played by Stuart Bowman, has a large part (if sparing with words) in Versailles, the 2015 British-Franco-Canadian television series drama set around the construction of the palace.
- Bontemps is a leading character in the computer game Versailles 1685, where the player takes the part of a junior valet helping him to thwart a plot at Versailles.

== Sources ==
- Da Vinha, Matheu, Les Valets de chambre de Louis XIV, Perrin, 2004; ISBN 2-262-02135-X Online text in French
- "SS Memoirs" = Duc de Saint-Simon, ed & trans Lucy Norton; Historical Memoirs of the Duc de Saint-Simon, Vols 1–3, 1967–72, Hamish Hamilton, London.

This article is partly sourced from the French Wikipedia article "Bontemps".
