= La Queue-les-Yvelines =

Commune in Île-de-France, France

- Commune
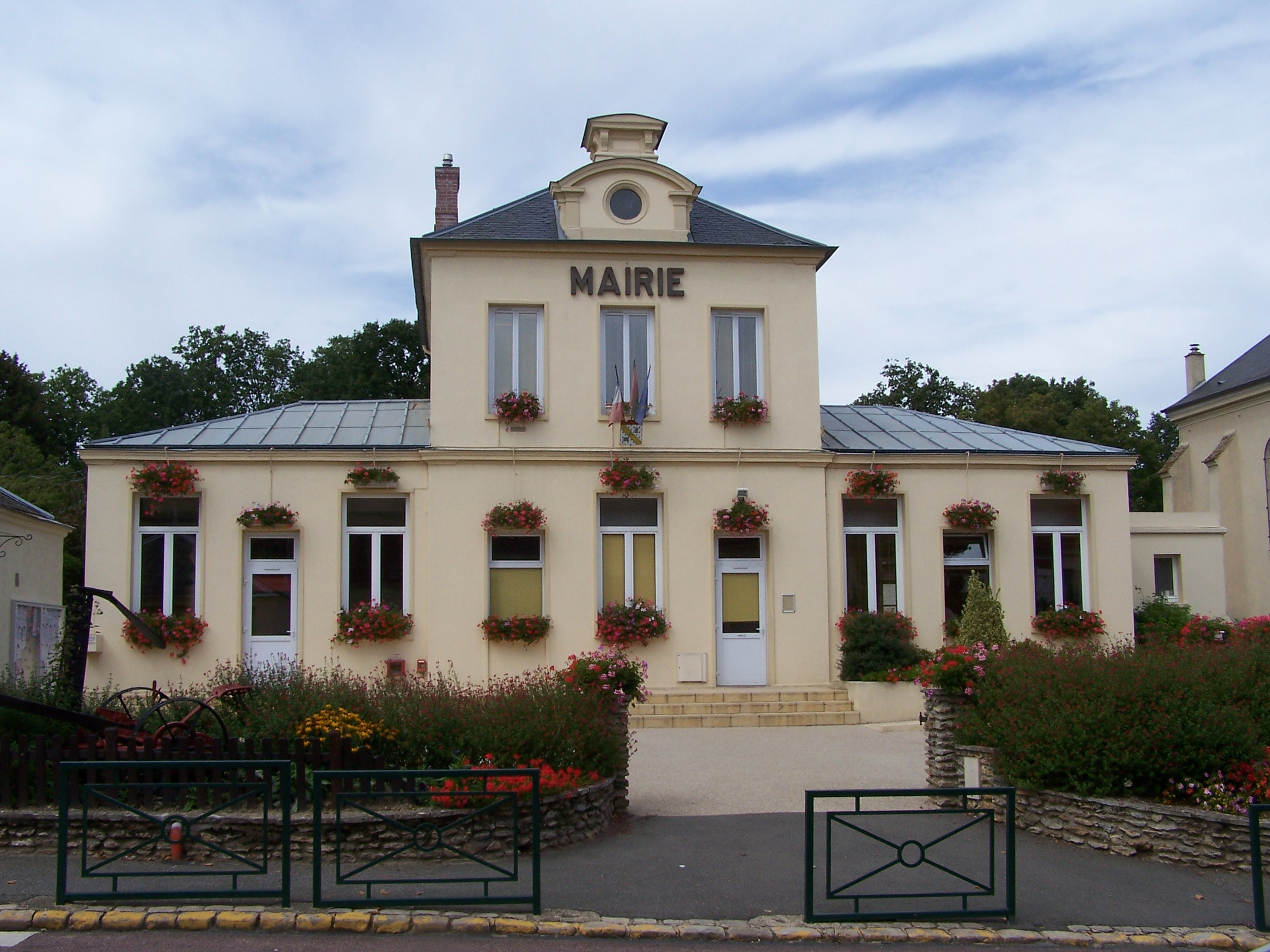
- Town hall

- Coat of arms
- Location of La Queue-les-Yvelines
- Location within France Location within Île-de-France (region)
- Coordinates: 48°48′22″N 1°46′10″E
- Country: France
- Region: Île-de-France
- Department: Yvelines
- Arrondissement: Rambouillet
- Canton: Aubergenville

Government
  - Mayor (2020–2026): Laurent Louesdon
- Area^{1}: 5.77 km^{2} (2.23 sq mi)
- Elevation: 180 m (590 ft)
- Highest elevation: 188 m (617 ft)
- Lowest elevation: 96 m (315 ft)
- Population (2023): 2,629
  - Density: 456/km^{2} (1,180/sq mi)
- Time zone: UTC+01:00 (CET)
  - Summer (DST): UTC+02:00 (CEST)
- INSEE/Postal code: 78513 /78940
- ^{1} French Land Register data, which excludes lakes, ponds, glaciers > 1 km^{2} (0.386 sq mi or 247 acres) and river estuaries.

La Queue-les-Yvelines (official spelling) (written as La Queue-lez-Yvelines by municipality) (French: [la kø le.z‿ivlin]) is a commune in the Yvelines department in the Île-de-France region in north-central France.

== Population ==
Historical population
Year	Pop.	±% p.a.
1968	908	—
1975	1,296	+5.21%
1982	1,753	+4.41%
1990	1,811	+0.41%
1999	1,844	+0.20%
2007	2,049	+1.33%
2012	2,168	+1.14%
2017	2,180	+0.11%
2023	2,629	+3.17%
Source: INSEE

== People ==
- Louise de Maisonblanche, Baroness of La Queue, illegitimate daughter of Louis XIV and Claude de Vin des Œillets died here in 1718.

== See also ==
- Communes of the Yvelines department
