= Nando (architecture) =

Japanese furniture

A nando (納戸 (なんど)) is a space in houses in Japan used for storing clothing, furniture, and other items that are not used on a daily basis. According to Japan's Building Standards Act (建築基準法), it refers to spaces that do not meet the criteria for living rooms.

== Origin ==
In the shinden-zukuri architectural style of the Heian period, there was a closed space called nurigome (塗籠), surrounded on all sides by earthen walls, with almost no openings other than the entrance doors. This is depicted in the 14th-century scroll painting "Bokie" (慕帰絵). While the nurigome was also used as a bedroom, it became known as "nando" due to its use in storing valuables, as "nando" means "storeroom".

Afterward, the nurigome remained as sword rooms in imperial palaces, and as a formality in samurai residences until the Edo period, but they were never used as bedrooms and were instead used as storerooms for valuables. The practice of creating a closed-off section in a dwelling to store things gradually spread to commoners, leading to the term "nando" being used to refer to such spaces.

== Naming and usage ==
According to regulations certified by the Fair Trade Commission and applied by Japan's Real Estate Fair Trade Council Federation, spaces that do not meet the criteria for living rooms under building standards, due to insufficient openings (such as windows) resulting in inadequate lighting and ventilation, or low ceiling height, are designated as "nando".

In real estate, the initial "S" from "service room" or "spare room" is used to denote nando in floor plans. For example, floor plans including rooms that do not fulfill the requirements for "3LDK" (three bedrooms, living room, dining room, and kitchen) might be labelled as "2SLDK" (two bedrooms, "spare room" or nando, living room, dining room, and kitchen). This is done with the aim of appealing to potential buyers, indicating that while these spaces cannot be classified as living rooms due to regulations, they may still be used as living spaces if overlooking deficiencies such as insufficient lighting. This serves to differentiate them from spaces like oshiire, which are clearly designated for storage only. Alternatively, they may be labelled as "utility space", "utility room", or "multipurpose room".

In households with few rooms, spaces measuring around 3 to 4.5 tatami mats are often used as children's rooms or studies.

Additionally, the traditional use of these spaces as bedrooms has continued even after they became known as "storerooms". In some rural areas of Japan, these spaces might still be referred to as bedrooms.
