= Colonial American bastardy laws =

Illegitimacy in early America

Colonial America bastardy laws were laws, statutes, or other legal precedents set forth by the English colonies in North America. This page focuses on the rules pertaining to bastardy that became law in the New England colonies of Massachusetts, Connecticut, and Pennsylvania from the early seventeenth century to the late eighteenth century. The colonies established many laws based on a combination of old English common law and their religious faith. European settlers established rules to guide society upon their arrival in North America. Many of these rules strongly resembled the established guidelines set forth by England. Although the laws differed initially in their creation and enforcement, by the late eighteenth century, the New England colonies and the colony of Pennsylvania had altered their laws pertaining to bastardy to be mirror images of the laws in effect in England.

== Criminal act of bastardy defined ==
A bastard is defined as a "(child) born out of wedlock or of adultery, illegitimate". In other words, a bastard is any child that is born from the result of a sexual encounter between a man and a woman who are not married to each other; if either party is married, the couple has committed adultery. In the eyes of the law, any child conceived by a couple that was not legally married was a bastard child. Bastard children were also known as illegitimate children, meaning that they legally had no standing in society. English and colonial America also had laws governing sexual activity between individuals. If two people had sexual intercourse without being married, then they had committed the crime of fornication. Typically, fornication and bastardy laws went hand in hand; in most instances, a case of bastardy did not exist without individuals having committed fornication. Regardless of conception, a bastard child fell under the governing rules of the land's bastardy laws. After a bastard child's birth, a trial for fornication or adultery usually followed. In England, churches saw a bastard child as the probable outcome for any case of fornication or adultery. Depending on location, bastardy laws appeared differently as each colony had separate rules on the subject. However, each colonial law regarding fornication, adultery, and bastardy took shape from the old English common law.

== Bastardy in English common law ==
Common law refers to decisions that apply throughout a region. A judge or magistrate decides on a particular case, then that decision becomes the basis for future decisions on similar cases. In England, evidence of common law existed as early as the tenth century. By 1135, most of the legal language used in legal decisions had appeared within the country.

By the mid-1070s, ecclesiastical courts heard cases that involved bastardy. Bastard children, according to English common law, were filius nullius, which meant that they were no one's child. They could not make any claim on their parents for support, nor was anyone indebted by law to take care of them. In public opinion, bastards had extremely low social standing.

Depending on the social and economic status of a bastard's parents, the bastard's situation could be drastically different. The bastards of wealthy and influential figures were, in many cases, taken care of by their birth mothers and given financial support by their fathers. The bastard children of lower families had to rely on relations for survival. In the worst cases, the "fatherless poor" lived off the charity of monasteries and municipalities that could lend aid. The monastery provided food and shelter, while the municipality handled the money pious people gave the poor. Towns also raised money for the poor.

In 1531, the first statute in England regarding bastardy came into existence. This law, known as Henry VIII's Old Poor Law, defined who bastards were and what their treatment was. Bastards were defined as a "Fatherless Poor Man's Child." Around 1531 in London, Christ's Hospital was built with specific instructions to provide care for bastard children. Under Tudor rule, bastards were the community's responsibility as they were no one's child yet still required care. By 1574, the large number of bastard children began to overload the monasteries and municipalities that were responsible for them. In that year, another statute regarding bastards allowed justices to issue bastardy orders that ordered that the reputed father of the bastard child pay the parish for the child's care. Thus began a new common law precedent that required that the father of a bastard child, once legally determined, be financially responsible for their child. Further Poor Law decrees came in 1563, 1572, 1576, 1579, and 1601. Within the new rules, municipalities gained the power to raise poor rates, select Collectors for the Poor and Guardians of the Poor, and to stop any illicit action within the governing body of a charitable organization.

While under common law, bastard children still held the filii nullius label, they often became "children of the parish" or "children of the borough," as those institutions became the ones responsible for the children's well-being. Further Acts of 1575 and 1609 declared that the mother of any bastard child would face corporal punishment or be placed in an English "House of Correction." Under English common law, the burden of taking care of any illegitimate child frequently fell on a church or the community in which the bastard lived. Only near the beginning of the seventeenth century did fathers of bastard children start having to be responsible for illegitimate children. English common law focused intensely on the legal issues surrounding bastard children and thus created bastardy rules on those principles. In the New England colonies and the colony of Pennsylvania, the old English common law earned respect and a place in establishing the rules of the colonies. Still, the colonists added new elements to their new legal system.

== Bastardy in the New England and Pennsylvania colonies ==
=== The establishment of law in the colonies ===
During the seventeenth century, when settlers started establishing permanent settlements in North America, decisions needed to be made concerning how the new legal system would work. The people who established the New England colonies came to the new world so they could create a new society that fashioned itself on the rules and teachings of their religion. The Puritans who founded the colonies of Connecticut and Massachusetts created many rules that had a basis in the Puritan faith. However, differences occurred within each colony as to the application of the law. For example, laws created in Massachusetts or Connecticut differed from laws created in Pennsylvania. Some of the differences in the rules within colonies came from the fact that different groups with different ideological backgrounds founded each colony. The Puritans founded the New England colonies, while the Quakers, led by William Penn, founded the colony of Pennsylvania. Due to the strong religious background of these colonies, colonists sought changes and improvements to the English common law. In many situations, the colonists would use a particular aspect of common law to build the foundation of a legal principle. Still, the details, such as the wording, implementation, and enforcement of said law fell to the colonists. The colonists did not want a carbon copy of English common law, as many left England and Europe in dispute of those laws, nor did the colonists decide upon a single, unified set of laws to govern the colonies as a large group. The colonies sought the means to create a legal system that looked out for each colony's interests. If English common law coincided with what the colonists wanted, then the law remained unaltered. However, if the common law did not represent all of what the colonists wanted, they sought the freedom to change laws to something that best suited them.

=== Women's rights/position under common law in colonies ===
Married women during colonial times in America fell under the English governance rule of feme covert. This meant that a married woman had no separate legal identity from that of her husband. A woman's wages, children, clothes, inheritances, and even her body fell under the control of her husband. Despite the feme covert status, women still had dealings with the legal system in colonial America. In the colony of Connecticut, women, because of the Puritan influence within the colony, still affected the law and courtroom decisions. Women contributed to court cases as witnesses, litigants, and criminal defendants. This was not the case in all colonies in North America but serves as proof that although women did not have nearly as many rights as their male counterparts, they still played a role in deciding how cases, including bastardy, were ruled.

=== The crime of bastardy ===
Men and women had equal roles in creating a situation where bastardy laws had to be enforced. All cases of bastardy heard before colonial courts were the direct result of an act of adultery or fornication. Early in colonial history, men took more responsibility for an act of fornication or a bastardy charge. Women before the courts claimed that they engaged in sexual activity with men and explained to the courtroom that if somehow they ended up pregnant, the man would marry them, thus preventing the birth of a bastard child. A child being born out of wedlock automatically resulted in a trial to determine who the father was and who and how the bastard would be cared for. To catch fornicators, one had to find either the couple committing the act or the couple had to confess their sin immediately. Someone seeing a pair engaged in fornication was rare. Thus, court cases often relied on confessions to bring about charges in a case of bastardy. By 1668, in the Massachusetts colony and others, the government enforced the practice of having midwives interrogate women during childbirth. It was believed that women endured so much anguish during birth that they would not lie and would truthfully confess to their sin of fornication and reveal who the baby's father was. Either the pregnant women would willingly tell someone that she had a bastard son, and then she would name the father, or a midwife would ask the mother to tell whether or not her child was legitimate. Bastardy cases in the colonies involved women of high, low, and middle standing, similar to England. Once a bastard child was born, women could not deny a charge of adultery or, more commonly, a charge of fornication.

The baby was undeniable proof that an illicit sexual act took place. Where the courts did have trouble was in determining who the father of the bastard was. While the courts believed women to be truthful during their childbirth confession, they were not always entirely. A woman could name a man who was later revealed not to be the baby's father. Such situations resulted in disputed paternity suits. In some cases, men asked women to deny their involvement and charge another man. While the courts initially relied on confessions to make judgments in bastardy cases, as it became apparent that the confessions could be dishonest, the courts gradually came to trust evidence-based claims more so than testimony-based claims. In the latter half of the eighteenth century, this trend reflected a growing shift in colonial courts as a movement away from more faith-based rules and towards law grounded more in English common law.

In the 1650s, when the colonial courts reached a verdict in cases of adultery or fornication, the guilty parties had to pay fines ranging from forty shillings to ten pounds and were publicly struck with a whip six to fifteen times. By the 1680s, the fine usually amounted to forty shillings, or ten whip blows. These punishments became standard procedure by 1692. From 1639 to 1666, in Connecticut, if a father did not willingly come forward to acknowledge his illegitimate child, the mother of the bastard received a public whipping. The thought was that the male would not stand idly by and watch the mother of his child receive such harsh punishment and public humiliation. Not all individuals who committed acts of fornication and bastardy ended up in front of a court. To avoid the penalties and shame of having a bastard child, men and women took different steps to prevent pregnancy while engaging in sexual behavior.

Over the eighteenth century, many colonial courts practiced greater regulation of women's sexuality and focused fornication prosecutions almost entirely on women.

=== Attempts to conceal crimes of bastardy ===
In colonial times, it was difficult to hide a pre-marital pregnancy. Even during cases of disputed paternity, one irrefutable fact was that a baby had been born and legally had no father. Men could avoid the label of "father" if the pregnant woman chose to hide or conceal the truth from her midwife or the courts. Trying to avoid the bastardy or fornication laws seemed the easiest way to avoid the stigmas attached to being guilty of fornication and bastardy. Both parents or each parent individually could flee the region. The reputed father had the option of arranging a private settlement with the mother to avoid publicly being a bastard's father.

Abortions, concealing births, tricked marriages, and bribery were used to help conceal crimes of bastardy. Other methods of preventing bastardy existed but were not widely used. Birth control existed within colonial America, but due to a lack of understanding of human anatomy, attempts at avoiding pregnancy during this time often failed. Coitus interruptus, which meant that the male withdrew before ejaculating, was not a useful method of birth control. Nor were barrier methods of contraception. Condoms existed, but males used them to prevent the spread of sexually transmitted diseases. People during the seventeenth and eighteenth centuries did not understand that condoms had other uses, such as a method to prevent pregnancy.

Males and females also made promises of abstinence, but that also did not always work as it should. To avoid bastardy, the couple had the option of engaging in infanticide, the intentional murder of a baby. Parents who engaged in infanticide used it as an absolute last resort to cover up a pre-marital pregnancy. In Pennsylvania, infanticide, defined legally, was concealing the death of a bastard child. There were laws in place against infanticide in each colony. However, establishing that infanticide took place proved difficult. Instances such as a child being stillborn or the jury of a court understanding a single mother's plight made cases of infanticide tough to prosecute. Options did exist for colonists to attempt to escape from bastardy and fornication charges, although many of those choices led to less-than-desirable outcomes.

=== Evolution of bastardy laws in the New England and Pennsylvania colonies ===
Bastardy laws existed in English common law and the colonies' laws. Colonial law, though, tried to establish a balance between common law and religious faith. As time passed, the legal precedents shifted, and the religious themes and tones within the law disappeared in favor of more legal terminology. By the late eighteenth century, bastardy cases became exclusive to courts and heard by judges and juries. Statutes in the colonies, similarly to in England, held that the reputed father, once determined, had to contribute financially to the bastard child. As the law evolved from 1690 to 1740, the burden of proof in any case changed from witness testimony to evidence presented in court. As the eighteenth century progressed, more and more faith aspects of law creation and enforcement began to fade away in the New England and Pennsylvania Colonies. The establishment of a basic system for regulating bastardy cases came in 1705 and went largely unchanged until 1828. This system essentially put into official writing the implementation and enforcement of bastardy laws before 1705. The bastardy case needed presentation before the court, the paternity needed a decision, and then child support was given to the appropriate figures.

The legal precedents created here faced evolution as colonial America changed. As in England, as rural towns gave way to urban cities, laws such as bastardy needed to be refined to fit the conditions of the colonies. As cities grew, the responsibility for bastards shifted from being solely the mother's responsibility to being the community's ward as well. The almshouse, a place for bastards to go and receive care, opened in Philadelphia in 1767. Its goal was to assist mothers and bastards without parents. Other groups, such as the Overseers of the Poor, came into prominence in the 1760s in Philadelphia. Overseers of the Poor functioned as the colonial version of England's Guardians of the Poor. The Overseers of the Poor's job included providing aid for those in need, including bastard children. Situations where the mother and father of the bastard could provide financial support and shelter for their bastard child were ideal; it often did not prove to be the case. Someone else needed to be responsible for bastards and others in need.

Closely resembling England's Guardians of the Poor, groups such as the Overseers of the Poor's job included ensuring fathers paid financial support to mothers or those in charge of the bastard child. Through the 1760s and the 1770s, the Overseers of the Poor regulated bastardy. The courts made decisions on bastardy cases and left the enforcement of any ruling given to the Overseers of the Poor. By 1767, the Overseers of the Poor documented all cases of bastardy that they dealt with, thus making sure that no bastard child or other individual in need went unnoticed. The Overseers of the Poor's primary goal was to regulate child support, not hand out punishments for sexual crimes committed by the parents.

That task still fell on the courts to take care of, but by the end of the eighteenth century, the courts had stopped prosecuting sexual behavior crimes. The weekly support payment for bastard children in the time shortly before the Revolutionary War broke out was approximately three shillings, or seven pounds and sixteen shillings per year. The father was not legally obligated to give any financial compensation to the mother, only the bastard child. That amount was hardly enough to take care of a child adequately, but it still provided mothers and the Overseers of the Poor a monetary amount to work with. If the amounts collected by the Overseers of the Poor were not enough, mothers and bastard children had the option of going to the almshouse, although many did not unless the situation was dire.

== See also ==
- Children of the plantation
- Issue (genealogy)
- Legitimacy (family law)
- Marriage of enslaved people (United States)
- Primogeniture
- Royal bastard
