= Claude de Vin, Mademoiselle des Œillets =

Mistress of Louis XIV (1637–1687)

Claude de Vin
- Mademoiselle des Œillets
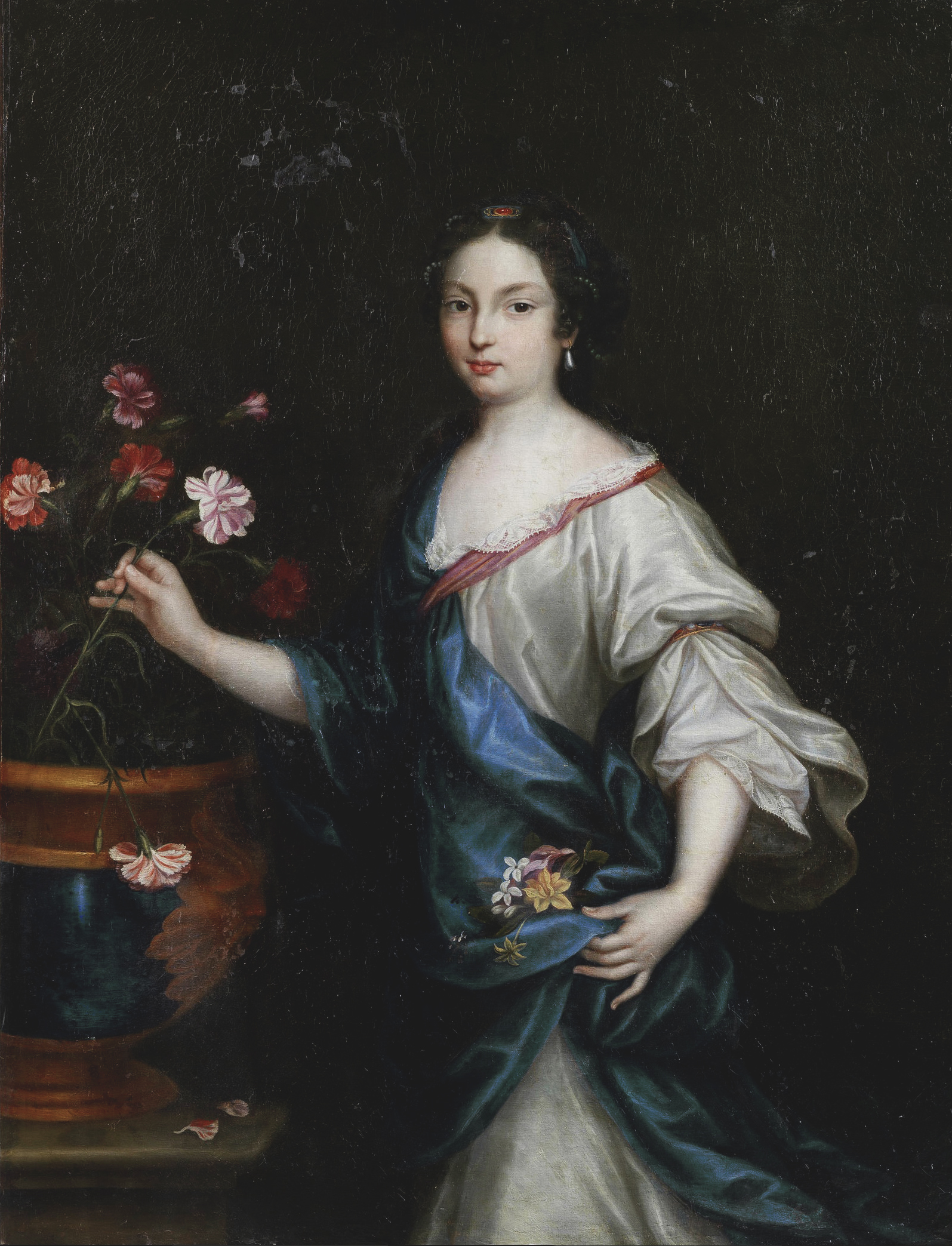
- Portrait by Mignard
- Full name: Claude de Vin
- Born: 1637; Provence, France
- Died: 18 May 1687 (aged 50); Rue Montmartre, Paris, France
- Issue: Louise, Baroness of La Queue
- Father: Nicolas de Vin
- Mother: Louise Faviot

Claude de Vin, Mademoiselle des Œillets styled and known as Mademoiselle des Œillets (French: [dɛz‿œjɛ]; 1637 in Provence – 18 May 1687 in Paris), was a mistress of King Louis XIV of France and the companion of the official royal mistress and favourite Madame de Montespan. She was known for her involvement in the famous Affair of the Poisons (1679–1680).

Daughter of the actors Nicolas de Vin and Louise Faviot.

She became the trusted lady's companion of Montespan before 1669. During the Affair of the Poisons, she was said to have made more than fifty visits to the poisoners. she was pointed out as the replacement of Montespan in the black masses. She was protected from any persecution by the monarch and his minister Jean-Baptiste Colbert, but the affair implicated Montespan and ruined the latter's relationship with the king.

Madamoiselle des Œillets retired from court in 1678 to a comfortable life in her Paris residence and country estate, the Château de Suisnes until her death.

1. She had a child by the king, Louise de Maisonblanche (17 June 1676 – 12 September 1718), later "Baroness of La Queue" by marriage. The king never recognised her as his daughter.
