= Oshiire =

Japanese furniture

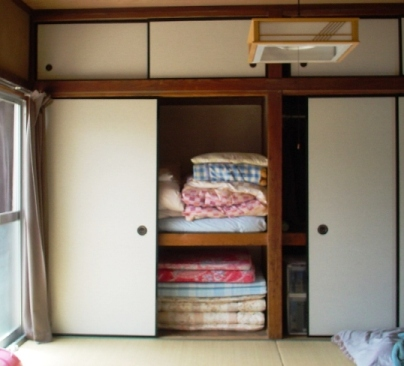
An oshiire, in which folded futons can be seen

An oshiire (押入れ, おしいれ) is a traditional Japanese closet. Its doors generally slide open. It was originally used to store futons during the day to allow full use of the room's floorspace.

== Origin and description ==
The term "oshi-ire" comes from two verbs, "osu", meaning "to push", and "ireru", meaning "to put inside".

Oshiire are of relatively recent origin, as they only gradually appeared during the second half of the Edo period. Previously, most Japanese people slept on hard surfaces, gathering in the smallest room of traditional houses of the time, the "nando", to keep warm. Straw was placed on the floor for comfort, and when the temperature was uncomfortably cold, people would sleep in straw sacks.

Bedding then developed thanks to cotton, the use of which became widespread in the 17th century. It was at this time that the need arose for greater storage space within the house itself, at least for those who could afford it.

Considering their role in storing futons and bedding, oshiire are very large, much larger than Western closets, which are primarily used for clothing. In general, an oshiire is closed by fusuma (sliding doors). In principle, an oshiire is the size of a tatami mat and is divided horizontally in two across the middle.

== Usage ==
Oshiire are found in washitsu (rooms with Japanese-style furnishings) as futons are not typically used in Western-style rooms.

Furthermore, it is not customary in Japan to leave bedding in the room during the day, therefore the futon is usually laid outside to dry and then stored in the oshiire. To store it, the futon is folded into thirds. Once the bedding is stored, the room can be used for other purposes, such as entertaining friends, dining, or watching television.

In addition to the futon, the oshiire is also used to store makura (pillows), sheets, blankets, and zabuton (sitting cushions).
