= Alix Faviot =

French actress

Alix Faviot, known under the stage name of Mademoiselle Des Œillets (1620–1670), was a French stage actress.

== Life ==
Her parents and background are unknown. She married Nicolas de Vis (or de Vin), sieur Des Œillets, sometime before 1637, when they became the parents of Claude de Vin des Œillets. It has been suggested by Jean Lemoine that she and her spouse were engaged at the Théâtre du Marais in the 1630s, but this has not been documented. She is likely to have been active as an actor in the provinces before coming to Paris.

=== Career ===
She was engaged at Théâtre du Marais in 1649–1662 and the Hôtel de Bourgogne (theatre) in 1662–1670. She was first documented in 1649 when she was described as a widow living in the rue Vieille-du-Temple in Paris near the Théâtre du Marais, where she is likely to have been employed at the time. She is clearly documented as engaged at the Théâtre du Marais in 1660.

In February 1662 she played the role of Viriate in Pierre Corneilles Sertorius at the Théâtre du Marais, which may have been written to feature her and became a great success, establishing her fame from then on. After the success she left the Théâtre du Marais for the Hôtel de Bourgogne, where she played the same successful role of Viriate in Sertorius in the 1662–63 season. She was engaged to replace Jeanne Auzoult (Mlle Baron).

Pierre Corneille also followed her to the Hôtel de Bourgogne: when asked by the Marais to write a new play, that he could not offer anything so soon, but "I will be delighted to take my turn at the Hotel from time to time...and I cannot fail the friendship of Queen Viriate, to whom I am so obliged". Instead, he wrote the Sophonisbe for Mlle Des Œillets, who performed the title role at the Hôtel de Bourgogne to great success in the 1663-64 season. Her performance was described by Donneau de Vise:

"This role, which is the most predominant in the play, is played by Mlle des Œillets, who is one of the premier actresses in the world, and who maintains the great reputation that she has enjoyed for a long time. I will not eulogize her, because I could not eulogize her enough. I will be content only to say that she plays this role divinely, better than can be imagined; that M. Corneille has to be obliged to her for it, and that if you go to see this play only to see this inimitable actress, you will leave completely satisfied."

She was known for her interpretations of roles in plays by Corneille (such as Sophonisbe in Sophonisbe) and Racine (such as Agrippine in Britannicus). She was considered the best tragic actress of the 1660s, during which created the leading roles in several tragedies of Pierre Corneille (Sertorius, Sophonisbe, Otto) and Jean Racine. One of her best-known parts was the innocent princess Hermione in Racine’s Andromaque (1665–66).

== Legacy ==
She was as famed in her time as her contemporaries Mlle Du Parc, Mademoiselle Molière and Mlle Champmesle, but she was never the object of any scandal and her fame, therefore, disappeared after her death. She has been referred to as "the most accomplished actress of the period", but was forgotten after her death and less known in history.

Her contemporary Marie-Angelique Du Croisy, Mlle Poisson, described her as "a very excellent and even charming actress, although ugly, not young, and very thin but, in spite of all that, very pleasing". Raymond Poisson included her in his comedy Le Poete basque, in which a baron, Basque, comes to the theatre hoping to see “Dalidor [Floridor] who does marvels,” and "also La Zeuillets [Des Œillets] said to be without parallel. Although she doesn’t have great beauty, it’s said that the listener is enchanted by her".

In his letter epitaph after her death, Raymond Poisson wrote:

And it justly could be said of her
That she was not as beautiful in the light of day
As she was in the light of the candles;
But without inspiring love,
And neither young nor beautiful,
She charmed all the court.
