= Chambre du Roi =

La Chambre du Roi (French pronunciation: [la ʃɑ̃bʁ dy ʁwa]), "the king's bedchamber") has always been the central feature of the king's apartment in traditional French palace design Ceremonies surrounding the daily life of the king—such as the levée (the ceremonial raising and dressing of the king held in the morning) and the coucher (the ceremonial undressing and putting to bed of the king)—were conducted in the bedchamber.

In 17th century France under the absolutism of Louis XIV, the bedchamber became the focal point—physically as well as ideologically—of the palace of Versailles. However, the bedchamber—and more particularly the bed—played a singular role in French cultural history during the Ancien Régime.

While a throne has been associated with most European monarchies as a symbol of temporal authority, in France of the Ancien Régime, the throne was virtually non-existent. The only time that a throne, per se, was used during the Ancien Régime was during the king's coronation—as which time it was known as the chaise du sacre—and was used only for the ceremonies of anointing and crowning of the king. During the Ancien Régime, the true symbol of royal authority was the bed.

On the morning of the king's coronation one of the high-ranking ecclesiastic and one of the high-ranking secular peers of the realm (respectively, usually the archbishop of Laon and the duke of Burgundy; however, this varied depending on the internal politics at the time of the coronation) would arrive at the door of the king's bedchamber in the Palais de Tau (the archiepiscopal palace at Reims). The ceremony of the waking king would ensue: the peers would knock on the door of the king's bedchamber and ask, "We have come for the king." "He is not here," would be intoned from behind the door. The question would be placed twice more; the reply to the third time the question was asked, would be, "He is not here, he is risen." At which point, the door opened and the peers saw the king, fully dressed in his coronation robes, reclining on the bed. The two peers would then ceremonially lift the king to his feet and escort him to the cathedral for the coronation.

Monarchial rule in France under the Ancien Régime was autocratic and the king's will was obeyed, by and large, universally in the realm. However, there were occasions in which royal authority was challenged—namely with the Parlements. During the Ancien Régime, France was divided into jurisdictions which presided—in the name of the king—over legal issues. The Parlement of Paris was the oldest and held sway over the provincial parlements. When royal edicts needed to be officially registered, they were sent to the Parlement of Paris (or provincial parlements, depending on the issue at hand). If the parlement judged the edict not to be in the interest of the state, it would refuse to register the edict. In such cases, the king would appear in state and would preside over a ceremony in which he would impose his will on parlement to force registration of the edict. This ceremony was call a lit de justice—bed of justice. Rather than the king sitting on a throne, he would recline on a bed-like piece of furniture in order to preside over the ceremony.

The bed as a symbol of royal authority was further emphasized in that the bed was always placed in an alcove that was separated by a decorative balustrade. Entry into the alcove behind the balustrade was strictly forbidden, unless authorized by the king. Additionally, during the Ancien Régime, court etiquette demanded that when one passed in front of the king's bed, reverence had to be paid: women deeply curtsied; men removed their hats and bowed. Furthermore, when the king died, a full-sized effigy would be placed on the bed and displayed publicly for two weeks, until the king's body had been interred in the royal crypt at the Basilica of Saint Denis.

In many respect, the chambre du roi and the bed represented the unbroken continuation of the monarchy. For while the corporeal aspect of the king died, the spiritual—which is to say the soul of the king and, by association, that of the state—passed unbroken to the successor.
