= Madeleine Lemeine =

French stage actress

Madeleine Lemeine, stage name Mademoiselle Beaupré (c. 1598 – 1655), was a French stage actress.

She was the daughter of a merchant from Chatres-sous-Montlhery in the Ile-de-France. In 1623, she married the actor Nicolas Lion, stage name Beaupré: at the time of her marriage she was described as majeure, that is of legal age, and therefore over the age of 25. Her spouse was active in the provinces while she performed in Paris. In 1644 it was noted that she was “separee de biens avec lui”, that is legally separated.

She was engaged in the Grands Comediens (Comédiens du Roi) at the Hôtel de Bourgogne, which was opened in 1628. In 1632, she and five other actresses of the theatre are identified. Other actresses of the theater were Mlle Valliot, Mlle Bellerose, Mlle Le Noir and Mlle Beauchateau.

Mlle Beaupre and Mlle Valliot are described as the two principal star actresses of the theatre. The repertoire of the theatre are documented and clearly show that roles for women are provided for in the plays, but it is not confirmed which actor played which role. They appear to have been known for farce and breeches roles. They are known to have played the two major roles as the wives of Gaultier and Boniface in the farce La Comedie des comediens by Gougenot.

Mlle Beaupre is noted in an incident from 1649 described by Tallemant. According to Tallemant, Mlle Beaupre performed at the Théâtre du Marais when she came in to conflict with a young actress:

“‘I can see, Mademoiselle,’ said Mlle Beaupre´, ‘that you want to see me sword in hand.’ And so saying, she went to fetch two blunted swords. The girl took one, thinking it was a joke. Mlle Beaupre´, angry, wounded her in the neck and would have killed her.”

She was apparently wealthy, as she is noted to have loaned 10,333 livres, 8 sous to the owners of the Marais in 1647.
