= Elisabeth Dispannet =

French actress

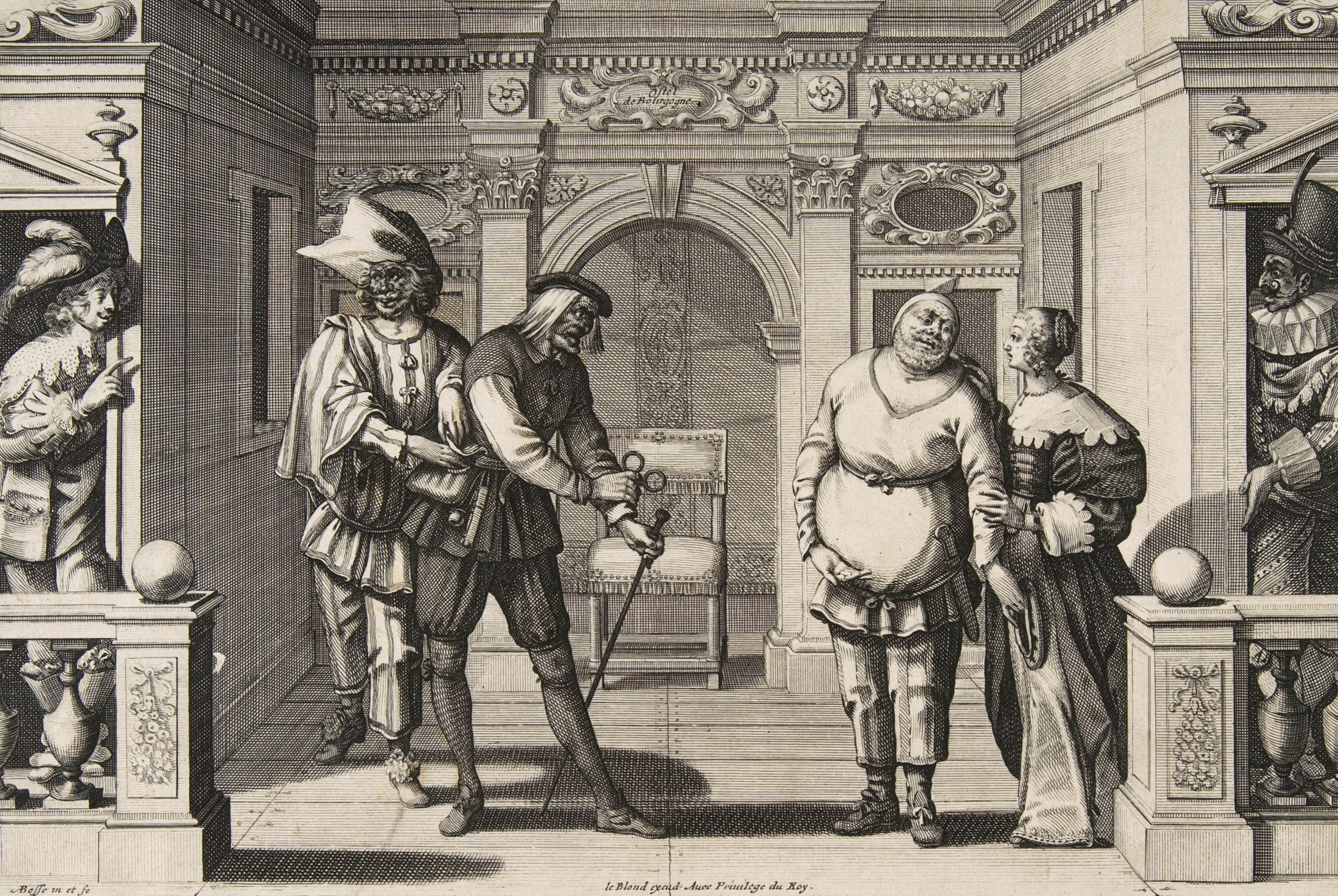
Abraham Bosse, Actors at the Hotel de Bourgogne 2, ca. 1633–34. The woman is likely Elisabeth Dispannet.

Elisabeth Dispannet, stage name Mademoiselle Valliot (fl. 1632 – ?), was a French stage actress.

Her background is not known. She is known to have married in 1620 to the actor Jean Valliot, who is known to have been active in 1614–1627 and then probably died, as she is known to have been an independent widow during her period of fame in Paris in the 1630s.

She was engaged in the Grands Comediens (Comédiens du Roi) at the Hôtel de Bourgogne, which was opened in 1628. In 1632, she and five other actresses of the theatre are documented. Other actresses of the theater were Mlle Beaupré, Mlle Bellerose, Mlle Le Noir and Mlle Beauchateau.

The contemporary chronicle writer Tallemant described the Parisian actresses of the 1630s. He referred to Mlle Bellerose as a “good actress”, Mlle Valliot as “as beautiful a person as one could see,” Mlle Le Noir as a "as pretty a little person as one could find", Mlle Baron as "very pretty, not a marvelous actress, but a success thanks to her beauty", and Mlle Beaupré as "old and ugly".

Mlle Beaupré and Mlle Valliot are described as the two principal star actresses of the theatre. The repertoire of the theatre are documented and clearly show that roles for women are provided for in the plays, but it is not confirmed which actor played which role. They appear to have been known for farce and breeches roles. They are known to have played the two major roles as the wives of Gaultier and Boniface in the farce La Comedie des comediens by Gougenot in 1632–33.

Abraham Bosses famous engraving of Les Farceurs de l'Hoˆtel de Bourgogne of the three great comic stars of the company, Gros-Guillaume, Gaultier-Garguille, and Turlupin, also shows a young woman with one hand on Guillaume's arm, distracting Gaultier, who failed to notice Turlupin stealing his purse. This likely portrayed an actress of the theatre, likely Mlle Valliot, who plays the “femme de Gaultier” in Gougenots play.

She had a love affair with the fifteen years younger abbé Armentiéres, who later became the marquis d’Armentiéres, and who reportedly financed her and supported her after she left the stage and retired.
