= Hôtel de Bourgogne =

Hôtel de Bourgogne may refer to:

- Hôtel de Bourgogne, a former residence in Paris of which only the Tour Jean-sans-Peur survives
- Hôtel de Bourgogne (theatre), a former theatre in Paris
- Hôtel de Bourgogne (Luxembourg), the official residence and office of the Prime Ministers of Luxembourg
