= Mlle Le Noir =

French actress

Isabelle Mestivier (or more rarely Elizabeth Mestivier), stage name Mademoiselle Le Noir (fl. 1631 – fl. 1647), was a French stage actress.

== Life ==
She is first mentioned in 1631. She was the daughter of the actor Francois Mestivier (fl. 1622). On an unknown date, she married the actor Charles Le Noir (fl. 1618), who was active in the same travelling theatre company as her father.

=== Career ===
She was engaged in 1631 the troupe of Charles Le Noir and Guillaume Des Gilberts/Mondory, which was later to become the Théâtre du Marais. Pierre Corneille wrote plays for the theatre, and all but one contained two female roles, the “premiere” and “heroine” role. Between 1629 and 1634, only two actresses were employed by the theatre and able to play these roles, Mlle Le Noir (Isabelle or Elizabeth Mestivier) and Mlle de Villiers (Marguerite Béguin), it has often been assumed that he wrote the plays with them in mind. They performed a range of genres, tragicomedy, pastoral as well as comedy. However, it is seldom documented which of them played which part in the plays. In December 1634, she was one of six actors to join the Hôtel de Bourgogne (theatre) on the king's command.

She was a popular actress, which was said to have "delighted everyone with her liveliness and her pleasing little ways". She was also a talented stage artist, and played a part of the reintroduction of tragedy on the French stage. While it is seldom documented who played which part in the theatre of the 1630s, she is likely to have played the title role in Sophonisbe by Jean Mairet, which restored tragedy to the Paris stage in 1634.

The contemporary chronicler Tallemant described the Parisian actresses of the 1630s. He referred to Mlle Bellerose as a “good actress”, Mlle Valliot as “as beautiful a person as one could see,” Mlle Le Noir as a “as pretty a little person as one could find,” Mlle Baron as “very pretty, not a marvelous actress, but a success thanks to her beauty,” and Mlle Beaupré as “old and ugly.” Tallemant claimed that the playwright Jean Mairet wrote several starring roles for Mlle Le Noir on the order of Mairet's patron comte de Belin, “and the troupe was comfortable with that.” There is however nothing to indicate that Le Noir had an affair with Belin, as has sometimes been claimed.

=== Later life ===
She retired from the stage in 1637, when her spouse was murdered. The same year, her spouse had acquired a house, and while not rich, she was well off enough to be able to support herself and her five children as a widow. Her son Francois Le Noir, stage name La Thorillière, became an actor and the central figure of an acting family famous in contemporary Paris.
