= Montfleury =

Montfleury may mean:

- the stage name of Zacharie Jacob, a French actor and playwright of the 17th century
- the stage name of Antoine Jacob, a French actor and playwright, son of Zacharie
- a castle in Aosta
- part of the city of Tunis
- convent to which Mme de Tencin was confined against her will in 1708
- fictional character in Cyrano de Bergerac
