= Alexandre Hardy =

French dramatist (c. 1570/1572 – 1632)

Alexandre Hardy (c. 1570/1572 – 1632) was a French dramatist, one of the most prolific of all time. He claimed to have written some six hundred plays, but only thirty-four are extant.

== Biography ==
He was born in Paris, and seems to have been connected most his life with a troupe of actors (the "Comédiens du Roi") headed by the actor named Valleran Lecomte, whom he provided with plays; Hardy may have toured the provinces and even acted with this company (his participation with this troupe is attested from 1611, but may have begun far earlier). Valleran Lecomte's troupe gave performances in Paris from 1598 to 1600 at the Hôtel de Bourgogne, and again from 1606 to 1612. At the death of Valleran, the troupe was headed by the actor Bellerose (Pierre Le Messier), and the troupe would gain exclusive rights to the Hôtel de Bourgogne in 1629. Because of his difficult relations with Bellerose, in 1627 Hardy started writing for a rival troupe of actors (the "Vieux Comédiens du Roi") around Claude Deschamps which performed at the Théâtre du Marais.

Hardy's numerous dedications never seem to have brought him riches or even patrons. His most powerful friend was Isaac de Laffemas (d. 1657), one of Cardinal Richelieu's most unscrupulous agents, and he was on friendly terms with the poet Théophile de Viau, who addressed him in some verses placed at the head of his Théâtre (1632), and Tristan l'Hermite had a similar admiration for him. Hardy's plays were written for the stage, not to be read; and it was in the interest of the company that they should not be printed and thus fall into the common stock. Hardy wrote quickly, often adapting plays from French, foreign and classical sources (Ovid, Lucian, Plutarch, Xenophon, Quintus Curtius Rufus, Josephus, Miguel de Cervantes, Jorge de Montemayor, Boccaccio, François de Rosset).

In 1623 Hardy published les Chastes et Loyales Amours de Théagène et Chariclée, a tragicomedy in eight "days" or "dramatic poems", and in 1624 he began a collected edition of his works, Le Théâtre d'Alexandre Hardy, parisien, of which five volumes (1624–1628) were published, one at Rouen and the rest in Paris.

Hardy's extant plays are as follows:

Twelve tragedies:

- Didon se sacrifiant - the suicide of Dido
- Scédase ou l'Hospitalité violée - drawn from Plutarch: two young nobles of Sparta rape and kill two girls of the country while the girls' father is away; their father is unable to obtain justice and commits suicide.
- Panthée
- Méléagre
- La Mort d'Achille - the death of Achilles
- Coriolan - the story of Coriolanus
- Mariane
- La Mort de Daire - the death of Darius
- La Mort d'Alexandre - the death of Alexander the Great
- Timoclée ou la Juste Vengeance
- Lucrèce - drawn from Lope de Vega: a married man learns that his wife is committing adultery from the courtesan of her lover, and he kills his wife and rival, but is himself killed.
- Alcméon ou la Vengeance féminine - an adultery leads to murder.

Four plays variously listed as tragedies or tragicomedies:

- Procris ou la Jalousie infortunée - the story of Procris
- Alceste ou la Fidélité
- Ariadne ravie - the story of Ariadne's kidnapping by Theseus.
- Aristoclée

Ten tragicomedies:

- Arsacome
- Dorise
- Frégonde
- Elmire ou l'Heureuse Bigamie
- Gésippe - drawn from Boccaccio: a young man has his friend replace him in the marriage bed.
- Phraarte - drawn from the translation of Giovanni Battista Giraldi's Cent excellentes nouvelles (Paris, 1583)
- Cornélie
- La Force du sang - drawn from Miguel de Cervantes: a girl is raped anonymously by a young noble in Toledo and she gives birth to a son; seven years later this son is recognized by the young noble's family and the couple is married.
- Félismène - drawn from a Spanish source
- La Belle Egyptienne - drawn from a Spanish source

Three "dramatic poems":

- Les Chastes et Loyales Amours de Théagène et Chariclée - based on the ancient Greek novel by Heliodorus of Emesa.
- Le Ravissement de Proserpine par Pluton - the story of Prosperpina kidnapped by Pluto.
- La Gigantomachie

Five pastorals:

- Alphée, ou la justice d'amour (considered the best of his pastorals)
- Alcée
- Corinne
- Le Triomphe d'Amour
- L'Amour victorieux ou vengé

The titles of twelve more of Hardy's plays are also known.

According to the Encyclopædia Britannica Eleventh Edition (paraphrasing), Hardy's importance in the history of the French theatre has been frequently overlooked. Up to the end of the sixteenth century medieval farce and spectacle dominated the popular stage in Paris. The French Renaissance tragedy of Étienne Jodelle and his followers had been written for the learned, and in 1628 when Hardy's work was nearly over and Jean Rotrou and Jean Mairet were on the threshold of their careers, very few literary dramas by any other author other than Robert Garnier and Antoine de Montchrestien are known to have been produced.

Hardy educated the popular taste, and made possible the dramatic activity of the seventeenth century. He had abundant practical experience of the stage, and modified tragedy accordingly, maintaining five acts in verse, but suppressing the chorus (except in his earliest plays), limiting monologues (although monologues reappear in his later plays), and providing the action and variety which was denied to the lyrical drama of the Renaissance. He was a popularizer of the tragicomedy. His tragedies are close to the Senecan model (although at times they echo medieval morality plays), but Hardy was unconcerned with Renaissance or classical dramatic theory (Aristotle, Horace), the three unities (Hardy's plays feature many locations and extend past 24 hours) or the rules of "bienséance" (his plays openly portray rape and murder and often feature non-noble characters). Hardy's verse style is sometimes convoluted and awkward and he shows a certain love of rare or erudite words (both of these stylistic habits would be condemned by François de Malherbe in the same period); for these reasons later critics have called Hardy unreadable. It is impossible to know how much the dramatists of the seventeenth century were indebted to him in detail, since only a fraction of his work is preserved, but generally Hardy may be credited with developing a French theater of action. He died in 1632 of the plague.
