= Marguerite Béguin =

French actress

Marguerite Béguin, stage name Mademoiselle de Villiers (fl. 1627–1670), was a French stage actress.

She was the aunt of the actor Francoise Petit, Mlle Beauchamps. She married actor Claude Deschamps; it is unknown when, but she was his second spouse and it must have been after 1624, when he married his first wife Francoise Olivier.

She is first mentioned in 1627. She was engaged in the troupe of Mondory in the Théâtre du Marais in 1629, and then at the Hôtel de Bourgogne (theatre). Pierre Corneille wrote plays for the theatre, and all but one contained two female roles, the “premiere” and “heroine” role. Between 1629 and 1634, only two actresses were employed by the theatre and able to play these roles, Mlle Le Noir (Isabelle or Elizabeth Mestivier) and Mlle de Villiers (Marguerite Béguin), it has often been assumed that he wrote the plays with them in mind. They performed a range of genres, tragicomedy, pastoral as well as comedy. However, it is seldom documented which of them played which part in the plays. In 1637, she did play the premiere-role of Chimene in Le Cid.

The contemporary chronicler Tallemant noted that she had an affair with Henry II, Duke of Guise, archbishop of Rheims, who wore yellow silk stockings under his soutane because she liked the color yellow. Later, Tallemant describes her in the 1650s as "not too beautiful", and "an excellent person in her profession" and implicates she was the equal to Mondory.

She retired in 1660.
