= Pierre du Ryer =

French dramatist

Pierre du Ryer (c.1606 – 6 November 1658) was a French dramatist.

== Life and works ==
Du Ryer was born in Paris in about 1606. His early comedies are loosely modelled on those of Alexandre Hardy, but after the production of the Cid (1636) he became an imitator of Pierre Corneille; this was the period when he produced his masterpiece Scévole, probably in 1644 (the date generally given is 1646). Alcione (1638) was so popular that the abbé d'Aubignac knew it by heart, and Queen Christina of Sweden is said to have had it read to her three times in one day.

Du Ryer was a prolific dramatist. Among his other works were Saül (printed 1642), and a comedy, Les Vendanges de Suresnes (1635 or 1636). He died in Paris in 1658.
