= Antoine Jacob =

French actor

Antoine Jacob (1639, in Paris – 1685, in Aix), known as Montfleury, was a French actor, playwright and a rival of Molière.

== Life and works ==
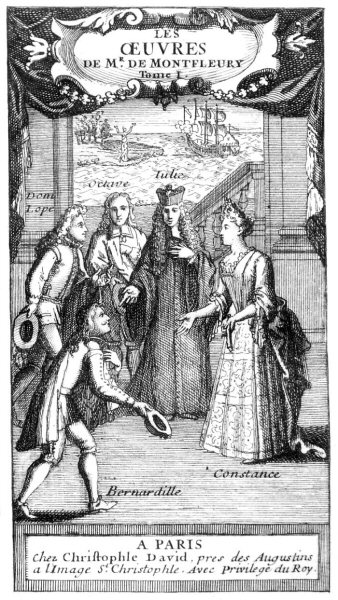
The characters of La Femme juge et partie from a posthumous edition

Antoine Jacob was the son of Zacharie Jacob, who was the first to adopt Montfleury as a stage name and had achieved great fame as an actor and playwright himself. Both were associated with the Hôtel de Bourgogne theatre troupe, an institution supported by King Louis XIV, and Antoine was to marry Marie-Marguerite de Soulas, daughter of the comedian Floridor in same troupe in 1665.

Antoine worked as a lawyer at first and turned to drama in 1660. His first productions, Le Mariage de rien (The void marriage) and Les Bestes raisonnables (The Reasoning Beasts), were the kind of one act farces that were fashionable at the time. The latter allowed him to satirise contemporary society. On the isle of Circe, Ulysses encounters the beasts she has transformed from humans: an ass that was once a doctor, a lion that had been a valet, a female doe and a horse, all of whom denounce the decadence of the times and resist being changed back. For the ass there are asses everywhere,

Asses in the town square, asses in the suburbs,
Asses in the provinces, asses proud at court,
Asses browsing in the meadows, military asses trooping,
Asses tripping it at balls, asses in the theatre stalls.

To drive the criticism home, in the end it is only the horse, formerly a courtesan, who is willing to return to her former state.

His first play to bring him to notice, however, was another satirical one-act verse drama, The Impromptu of the Hôtel de Condé (1663), written as a tit-for-tat response to one by Molière that had mocked his father Zacharie. The latter would subsequently deepen the feud, shortly before his own death, by accusing Molière of incest. Antoine went on to make his name as a playwright with La Femme juge et partie (1669), which ran simultaneously with Tartuffe and was accorded the respect of an equal work by contemporaries, although Montfleury remained committed to the situational comedy of Spanish theatre styles while Molière was recreating the Italian comedy of manners in a French mold.

Having produced a play more or less annually between 1660 and 1678, he turned tax collector in Provence with such success that in 1684 he was recalled to Paris to receive the post of Farmer General but died on the journey.

In 1999 there appeared Lovers and Executioners, an English-language adaption by the American playwright John Strand of La Femme juge et partie
