= Floridor =

French actor (died 1671)

Josias de Soûlas, known as "Floridor", Sieur de Prinefosse (c.1608-14 August 1671) was a French actor.

== Biography ==
He was born in Brie early in the 17th century, the son of a gentleman of German family who had moved to France, married there, and become a Roman Catholic. The son entered the French army, but after being promoted ensign, quit the army for the theatre, where he took the name of "Floridor." His first Paris appearance was in 1640. Three years later he was called to the company at the Hôtel de Bourgogne, where he played all the leading parts in tragedy and comedy and became the head of his profession. He was a man of superb physique and excellent carriage, with a flexible and sonorous voice, and manners of rare distinction and elegance, He was much liked at court, and Louis XIV held him in particular esteem.

The actor and playwright Noël Lebreton de Hauteroche succeeded him as head of the troupe at the Hôtel de Bourgogne.

== Family ==
His daughter was Marie-Marguerite de Soûlas, who married fellow actor and comedy writer Antoine Jacob in 1665.
