= Noël Lebreton de Hauteroche =

Noël Lebreton, sieur de Hauteroche (Paris, 1617 – Paris, 14 July 1707), was a French actor and playwright who died blind.

The son of a bailiff in Parlement, Hauteroche fled to Spain in order to escape a marriage that was to be imposed on him and became a comedian in Valencia. He played in Germany and founded his own company in Paris in 1654, then joined the Théâtre du Marais the same year and passed to the Hôtel de Bourgogne in 1660. In 1671, he succeeded Floridor as director of the troupe.

Representing the third tragic roles, he was noted for the skill with which he told stories. At the same time he composed comedies and was among the emulators of Molière. Without rising to the creation of characters or the painting of manners, his talent was to skillfully build a plot and sow the dialog with pleasant traits.

Retired from stage in 1684, he then experienced his greatest success as a playwright. L’Amant qui ne flatte point, in five acts, in verse (1668), Les Apparences trompeuses (1673), and L'Esprit follet (1684) were among his most popular plays.

Three of his plays, Crispin médecin, in three acts, in prose (1670), le Deuil, in one act, in verse (1680), le Cocher supposé, in one act (1684) remained quite some time in the repertoire.

His other plays include le Souper mal apprêté, in one acte, in verse (1670); les Apparences trompeuses ou les Maris infidèles, in three acts, in verse (167); Crispin musicien, in five acts, in verse (1674); les Nobles de province, in five acts, in verse (1678); la Barrette, in five acts, in prose (1680); la Dame invisible, in five acts, in verse (1685); le Feint Polonais ou la Veuve impertinente, in three acts, in prose (1686); les Bourgeoises, in five acts, in verse (1691), play imitated from Les Précieuses ridicules.

De Hauteroche was among the first actors in the troupe of the Comédie-Française (see Troupe of the Comédie-Française in 1680).

== Sources ==
- Gustave Vapereau, Dictionnaire universel des littératures, Paris, Hachette, 1876, p. 977
