= Zacharie Jacob =

French actor and playwright

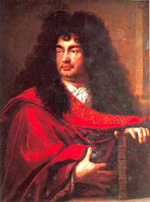
Montfleury, work attributed to Lebrun. Collection Comédie-Française

Zacharie Jacob (died 1667), known as Montfleury, was a famed French actor and playwright of the 17th century.

Jacob was born in Anjou during the last years of the 16th century. He was enrolled as one of the pages to the duc de Guise, but he ran away to join some strolling players, assuming the stage name of Montfleury. About 1635, he was a valued member of the company at the Hôtel de Bourgogne, and he was in the original cast of the Cid (1636) and of Horace (1640). Richelieu thought highly of him, and when in 1638, Montfleury married the actress Jeanne de la Chalpe (d. 1683), the cardinal desired the ceremony to take place at his own country house at Rueil.

He was the author of a tragedy, La Mort d'Asdrobal, performed in 1647. His son, Antoine Jacob, who was also known as Montfleury (often "Montfleury fils"), was a rival of Molière and Cyrano de Bergerac. Both father and son feuded with Molière. Zacharie was mocked for his girth in a Molière play, to which Antoine responded with one mocking Molière. Shortly before his death, Zacharie denounced Molière to King Louis XIV as having committed incest, a rumor which has never gone away.

Montfleury died in Paris from the rupture of a blood-vessel, while playing the part of Orestes in Andromaque, in December 1667. It is believed that a metal belt he used to support his enormous belly was the cause.
