= Mademoiselle Dennebault =

Françoise Jacob de Montfleury, stage name Mademoiselle Dennebault (1642 – 1708), was a French stage actress.

She was engaged at the Molière's company in 1661. She became a Sociétaires of the Comédie-Française in 1680. She retired in 1685.

She played the tragic heroines Junie (Britannicus, 1669) and Aricie (Phèdre, 1677) by Racine, in the comedies of her brother Antoine de Montfleury, as well as breeches roles of La Femme juge and La Fille capitaine.
