= Hôtel de Bourgogne (theatre) =

Former theatre in Paris, France

Coordinates: 48°51′51″N 2°20′53″E

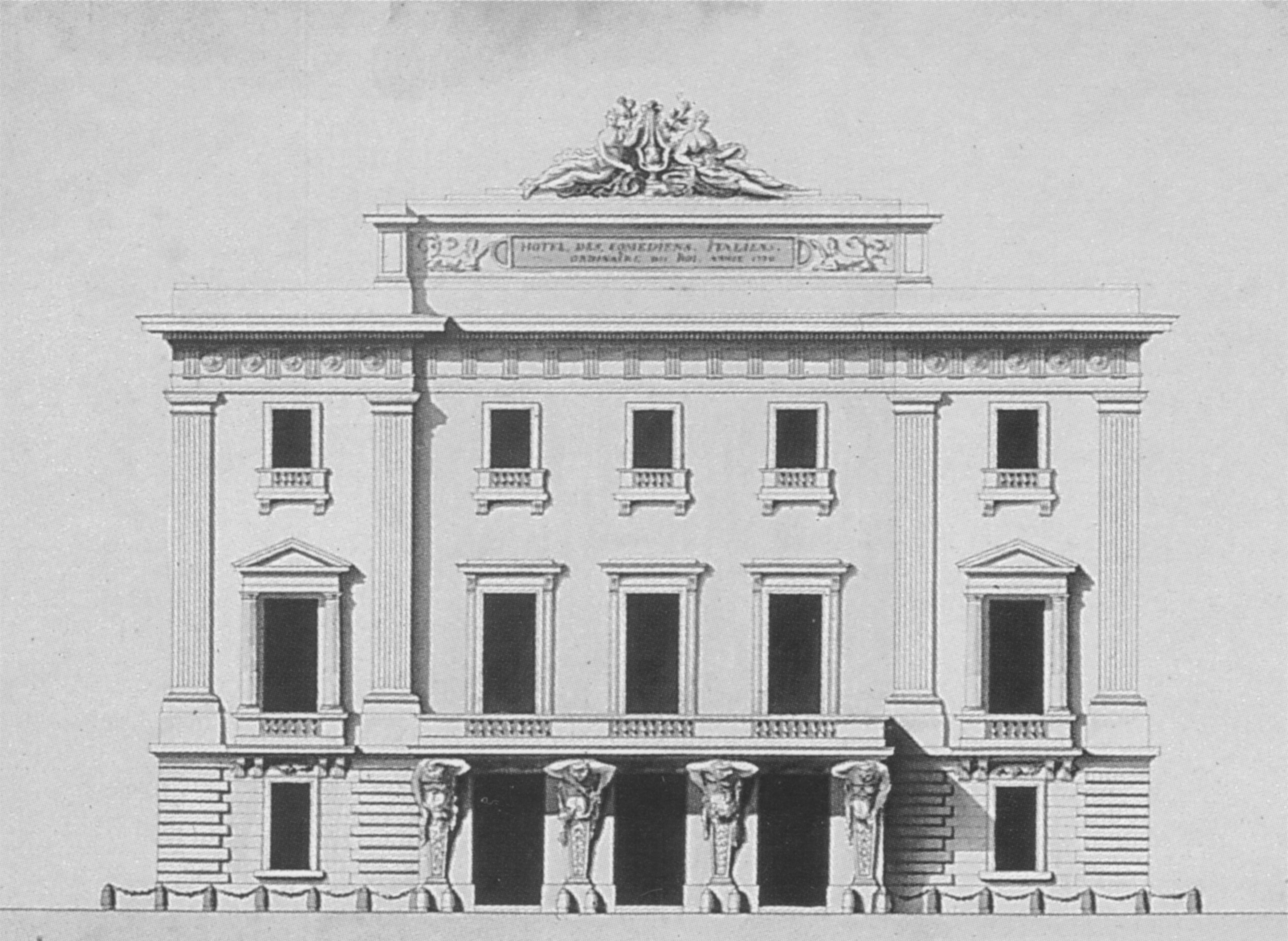
The Hôtel de Bourgogne in the 18th century

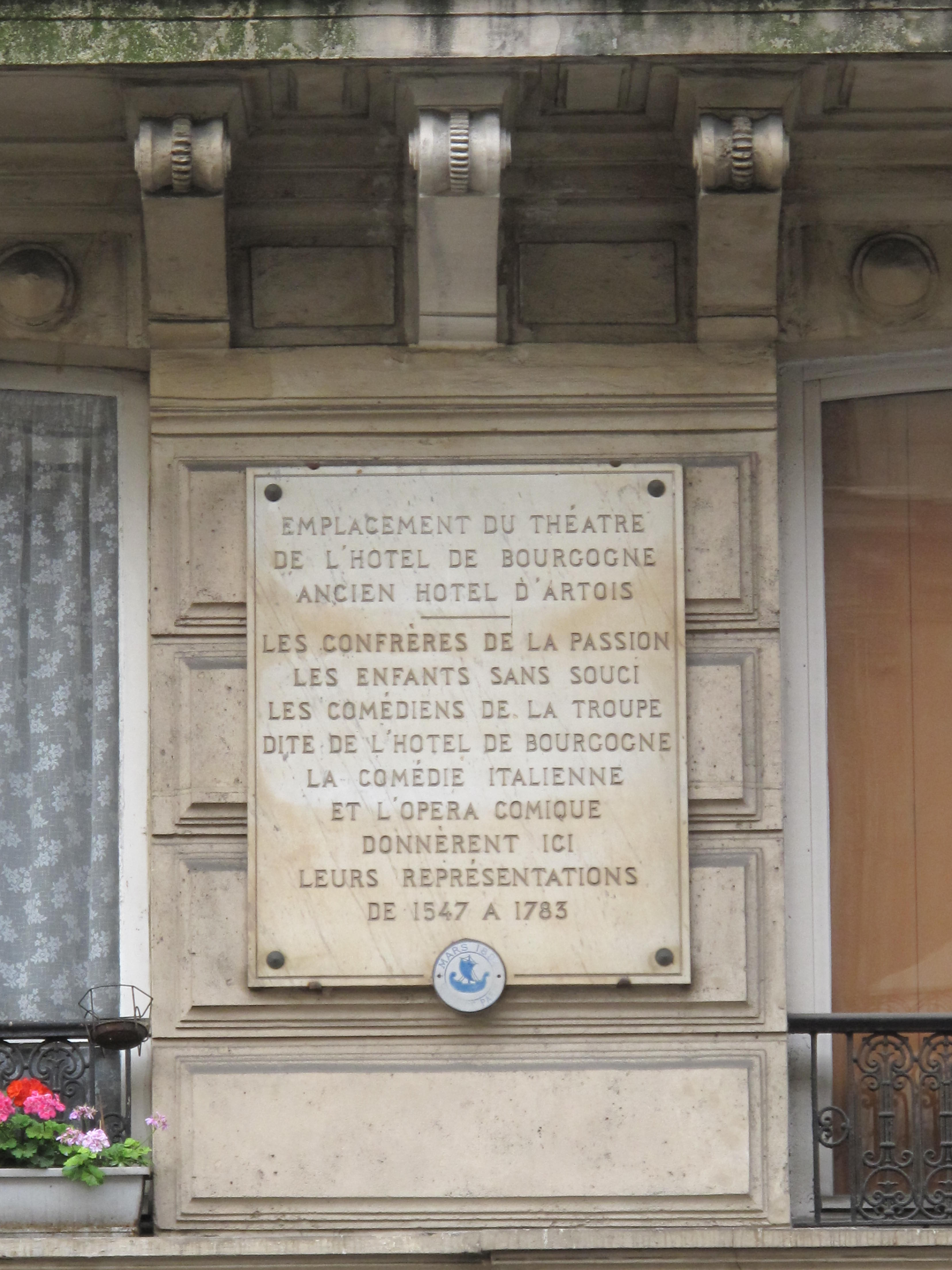
Plaque near the location of the former theatre of the Hôtel de Bourgogne

Hôtel de Bourgogne (French pronunciation: [otɛl də buʁɡɔɲ]) was a theatre, built in 1548 for the first authorized theatre troupe in Paris, the Confrérie de la Passion. It was located on the rue Mauconseil (now the rue Étienne Marcel in the 2nd arrondissement of Paris), on a site that had been part of the residence of the Dukes of Burgundy (the former Hôtel de Bourgogne). The most important French theatre until the 1630s, it continued to be used until 1783, after which it was converted to a leather market and eventually totally demolished.

The Confrérie performed farce and secular dramas, but lacking great success, began renting the theatre to itinerant acting companies, including Italian commedia dell'arte troupes, who introduced the characters Harlequin and Pantalone, as well as burlesque. In 1628, a French company, the Comédiens du Roi, became permanently established and performed many of the classics of French theatre, including Andromaque and Phèdre by Jean Racine.

In 1680, the Comédiens du Roi moved to the Guénégaud Theatre, merging with that theatre's resident French troupe (descendants of the troupe of Molière and the troupe from the Théâtre du Marais) to form the Comédie-Française. The Guénégaud's company of Italian actors moved to the now unoccupied Hôtel de Bourgogne and became known as the Comédie-Italienne. The Comédie-Italienne gradually began to perform plays in French, merged with the Opéra Comique of the Théâtre de la Foire in 1762, and moved to the Salle Favart in 1783, after which the theatre at the Hôtel de Bourgogne permanently closed.

== Confrérie de la Passion ==
In 1548, the society of the Confrérie de la Passion ("Brotherhood of the Passion"), having lost their previous theatrical space at the Hôtel de Flandre, built a new theatre on the grounds of the Hôtel de Bourgogne, the former residence (hôtel particulier) of the Dukes of Burgundy. The theatre is believed to have been long and narrow, 102 feet (31 m) by about 42 feet (13 m), and the depth of the stage, about 43 feet (13 m). The floor of the auditorium was mostly taken up by the pit, where the audience stood. At the back was a steep tier of benches on a base of about 10 feet (3.0 m). There were two levels of boxes, seven on each side and five at the back for a total of 38.

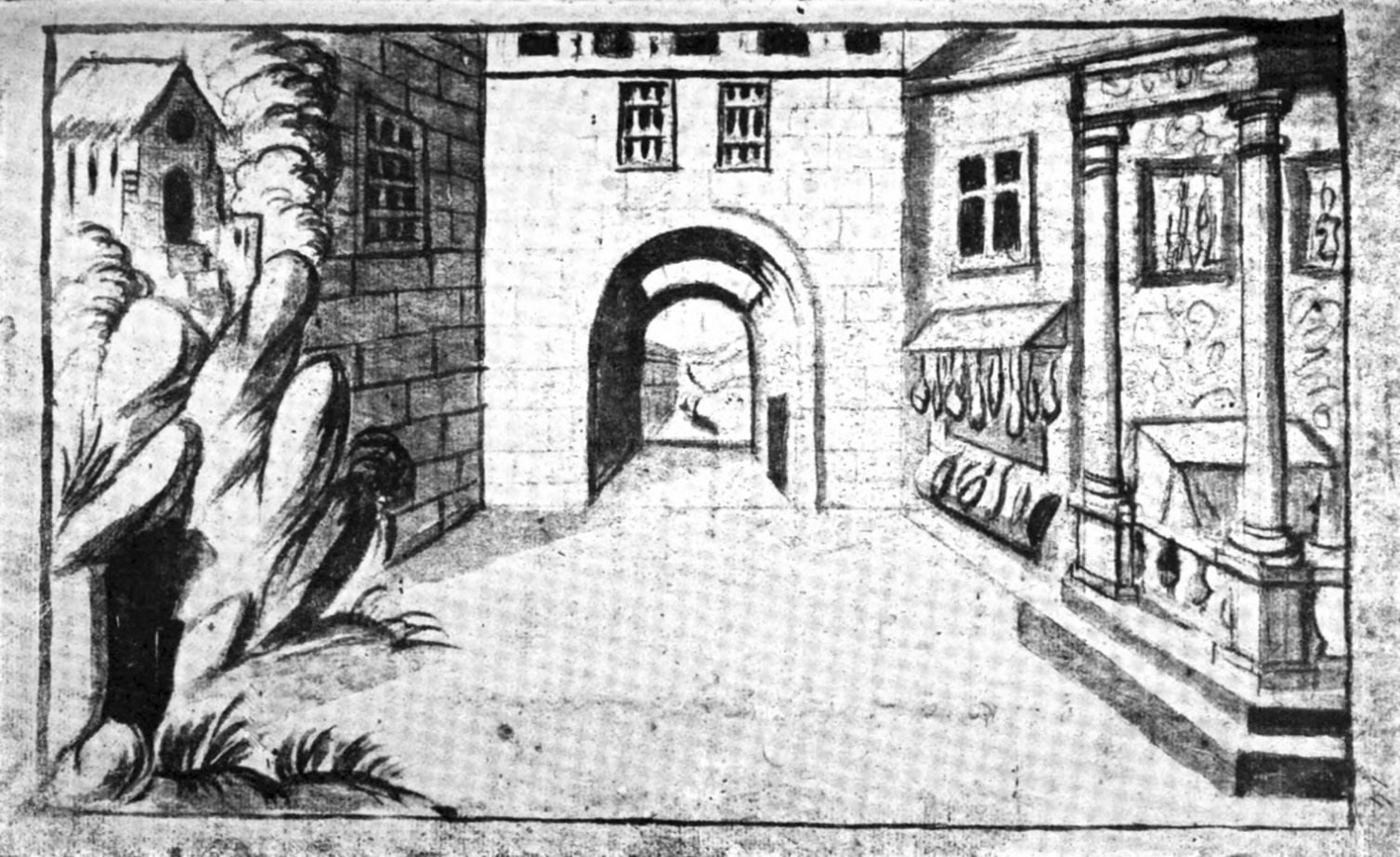
An example of décor simultané, the setting for Pierre du Ryer's tragicomedy Lisandre et Caliste, first performed c. 1630 at the Hôtel de Bourgogne

In 1402 the Confrérie had received a monopoly on the performance of religious mystery plays. Rival companies arose presenting satire and other types of comedy, and finding that these groups were attracting larger audiences than their own, the Confrérie responded by adding comic scenes and burlesques to their religious mysteries. Eventually this mix of the sacred and the profane came to be regarded by some as sacrilegious. After their new theatre was completed, the Confrérie petitioned the parliament of Paris for permission to commence performances. Although the parliament passed a decree of 17 November 1548 in their favor which prohibited all other groups from performing plays in Paris or its vicinity, it also prohibited the Confrérie from presenting the Passion or any other sacred subject.

The medieval mystery plays had originally been performed outdoors and employed the "multiple setting" (referred to as décor simultané in French), in which scenery representing 'mansions' or 'houses' was present simultaneously to either side of the main playing space. Although not used in England, the custom of multiple settings was adapted at the Bourgogne "in a cramped and curved indoor version which forced the actors to declaim downstage." This method of presentation was retained there up to the early 17th century.

By the end of the 16th century, the Confrérie's audience for farces and secular drama had declined, and they began to rent the theatre to itinerant, French and foreign theatrical troupes. The Italian troupe I Gelosi is known to have performed in the theatre. Agnan Sarat appeared there as early as 1578, and the English company of Jean Thays is believed to have been at the Bourgogne twenty years later.

== Comédiens du Roi ==
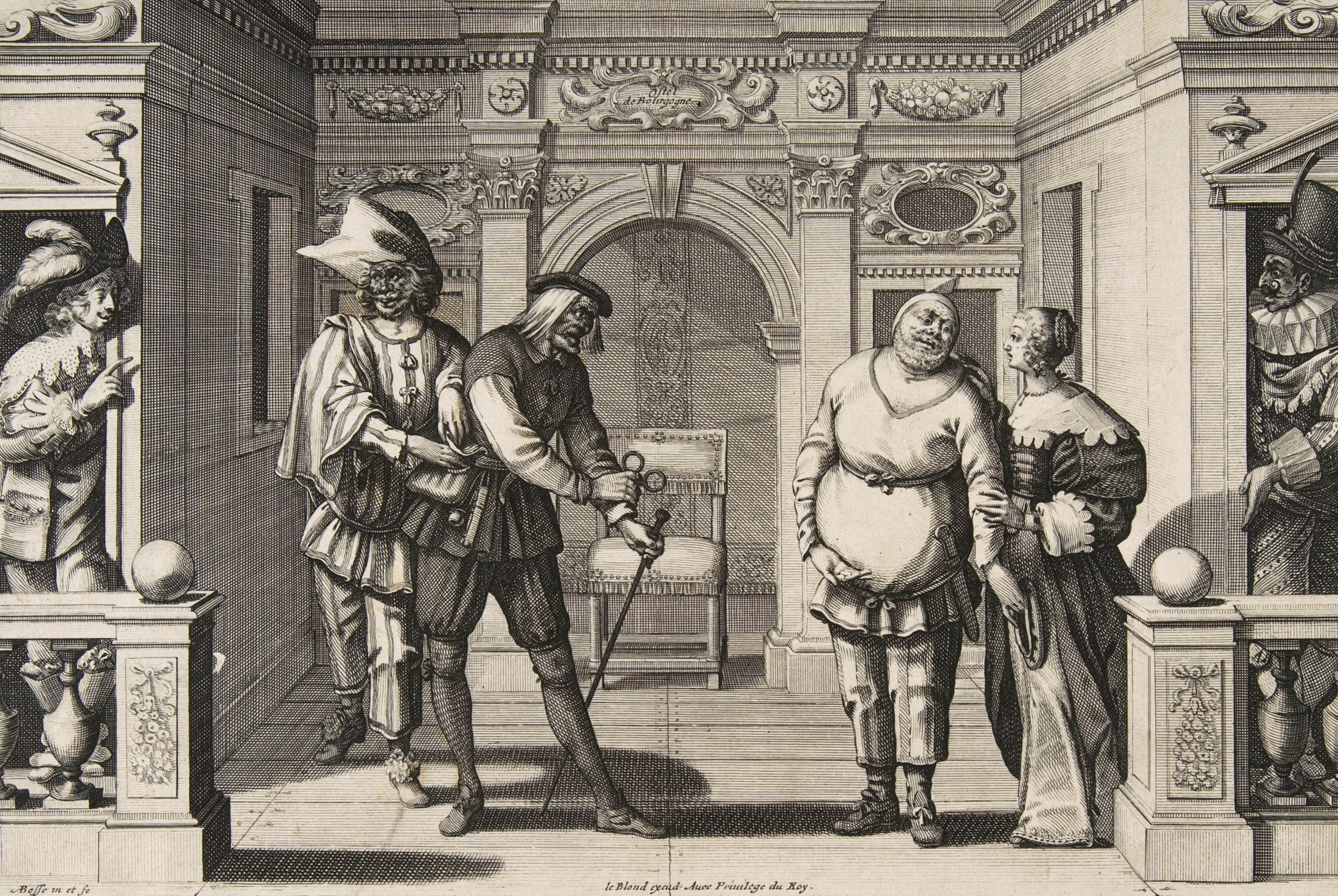
Stage set at the theatre of the Hôtel de Bourgogne. The chair indicates an interior. The characters portrayed show that a comedy is in progress. They are from left to right: "the watching Frenchman"; the celebrated comic actors: "wild-faced" Turlupin, "true" Gaulthier, Gros-Guillaume; a lady (possibly the actress Mlle Valliot); and a Spaniard (identified by his ruff). Turlupin is stealing Gaultier-Garguille's purse. The Frenchman and lady are dressed in fashionable contemporary costume. Engraving by Abraham Bosse (1634).

=== Early history ===
The Comédiens du Roi of Valleran Le Conte and Adrien Talmy arrived in 1599. Because of frequent money problems, Valleran's group could only appear intermittently at the Hôtel de Bourgogne and often toured the provinces. They were particularly associated with the works of Alexandre Hardy. The actor Bellerose joined Valleran's troupe in 1610, but subsequently (1619, 1620) also appeared with other groups in the provinces. The actor Gros-Guillaume joined Valleran in 1610, and became his co-director in 1612. Subsequently Gros-Guillaume became the sole director. From 1615 he worked closely with the actors Gautier-Garguille and Turlupin (also called Belleville). The trio were the preeminent farceurs on the Paris stage until about 1633. From about 1622 Bellerose returned and became an important member of the troupe, succeeding Gros-Guillaume as director upon the latter's death in 1634. Bellerose continued in that position until 1647.

From about 1622 to 1629 the theatre was shared with a rival troupe patronized by the Prince of Orange. Among its members was the tragedian Montdory. Montdory had previously appeared with Valleran's company in 1612 and would later join with Charles Lenoir in 1634 to found the Théâtre du Marais. The appearances of the Prince of Orange's troupe at the Bourgogne produced conflicts with the Comédiens du Roi, and the latter sometimes resorted to playing outside the theatre, blocking the public from entering to see their competitors. An act of the king's council of 29 December 1629 exclusively installed the Comédiens du Roi at the Bourgogne for three years. Montdory's troupe leased a succession of tennis courts in the Marais until they settled in their final tennis court, the Théâtre du Marais on the rue Vieille-du-Temple, in 1634.

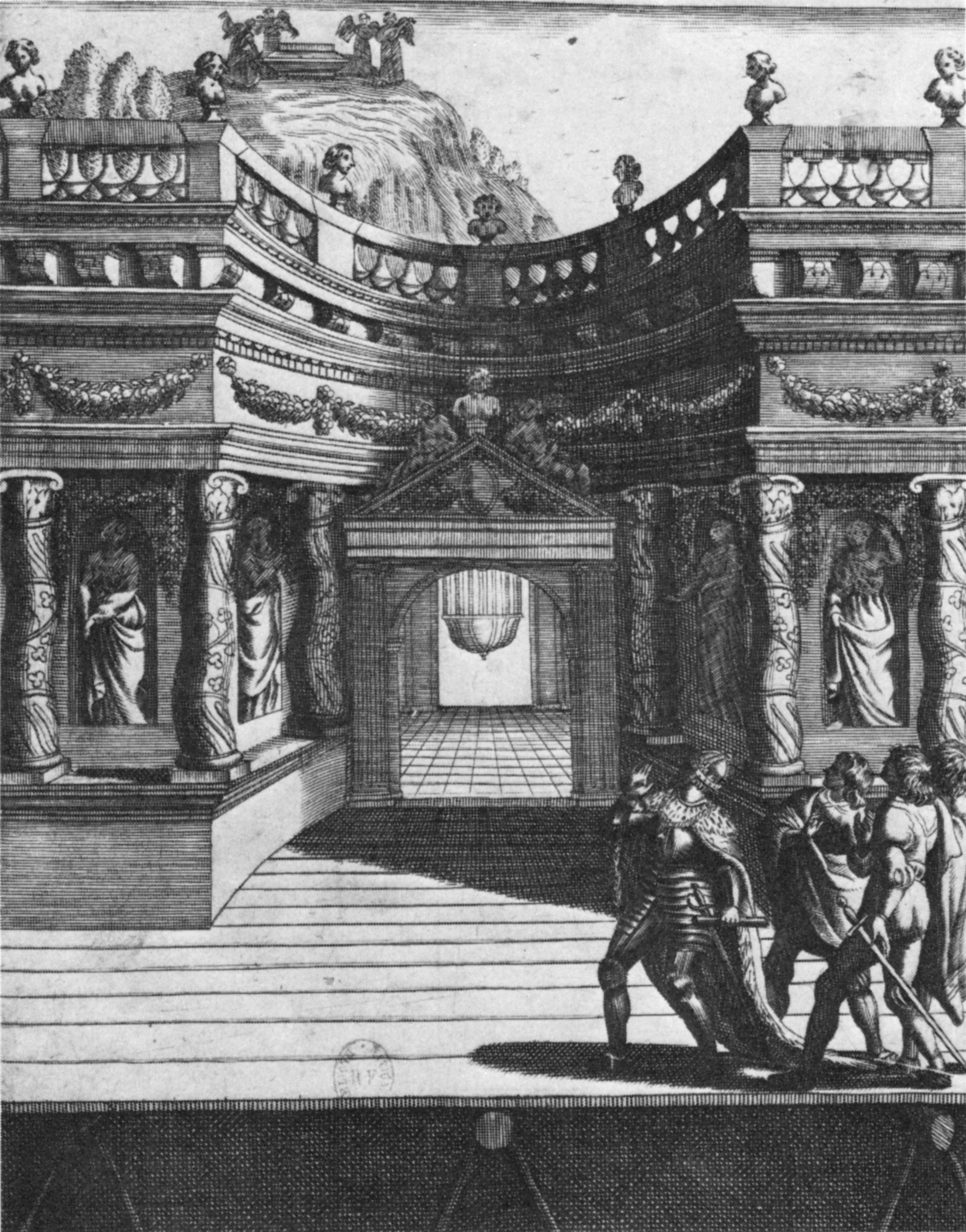
Setting for Act 5 of Le Martyre de Sainte Catherine by Jean Puget de la Serre, first produced in 1643 at the Hôtel de Bourgogne and a possible example of the use of the théâtre supérieur

=== Competition with the Marais ===
After Montdory's founding of the Théâtre du Marais, intense rivalry between the two companies caused the Comédiens du Roi to engage in costly disputes with both their chief playwright, Jean Rotrou, and the leaseholders of the Bourgogne. Nevertheless, under the leadership of Bellerose the troupe became the recipient of royal patronage and began to produce plays that had been introduced at the Marais. Like the Marais, the Bourgogne had a théâtre supérieur, a second stage raised above the main platform sometimes used for action in the heavens, although the one at the Bourgogne may have been removable. In 1647 the company was able to refurbish the Bourgogne theatre, using the renovated Marais theatre as a model. Later that same year Bellerose sold his share of the company "for an unprecedented sum" to his brother-in-law, the actor Floridor, who left the Marais to become the leading actor with the Comédiens de Roi. Floridor also brought the playwright Pierre Corneille, who gave the company the first-performance rights for his new plays.

=== Competition with Molière ===
By 1649 the Comédiens du Roi had become so successful, they were referred to as "les grands comédiens" in contrast to the troupe of the Marais, who were called "les petits comédiens". In 1658 the principal actors included Floridor, Villiers (Claude Deschamps), Montfleury (Zacharie Jacob), and Beauchasteau (François Chastelet), along with their wives: Marguerite Baloré, Marguerite Béguin, Jeanne de la Chappe, and Madeleine de Pouget. All the actors attended Molière's command performance given that year at the Louvre after his troupe's arrival in Paris from the provinces. They clearly recognized that Molière represented a serious challenge to their dominance, which had grown even more with the decline of the Marais after 1653. Concerned about the future, the troupe at the Bourgogne quickly added two new actors, Hauteroche (Noël Breton) and Belleroche/Crispin (Raymond Poisson).

The competition ignited with a quarrel over Molière's The School for Wives, produced at the Palais Royal theatre in 1662. Donneau de Visé's Zélinde (1663) was primarily a literary critique of Molière's play, but Edmé Boursault's Portrait de peintre (1663) attacked Molière's moral character and insinuated Molière had committed incest with his recent marriage to Armande Béjart. Molière's reply to Donneau de Visé was his La Critique de l'École des femmes (1663), but he refused to reply in kind to Boursault's disrespectful attack, and instead staged L'Impromptu de Versailles (1663), a parody of the acting styles of the main players at the Bourgogne.

Further competition ensued in 1665, when both companies produced different comedies with the same title, La Mère coquette: Molière's text was by Donneau de Visé and the Bourgogne's, by Philippe Quinault. Neither play was very successful. Molière staged Jean Racine's Alexandre le grand et Porus at the Palais-Royal in December and the Bourgogne responded with a revival of the abbé Claude Boyer's Porus, ou la générosité d'Alexandre. Although Racine's was clearly the better play and was doing well, for some reason he decided to approve a performance at the Bourgogne by the Comédiens du Roi. This caused a serious rift between Racine and Molière, and all of Racine's subsequent plays were premiered by the Comédiens du Roi. The last of the duels between the two companies came in 1670, when the Bourgogne produced Racine's Bérénice on 21 November and Molière, at the Palais-Royal, Pierre Corneille's Tite et Bérénice on 28 November. Both plays were initially very successful, although Racine's has been the more popular with time.

By the end of 1671 the composition of the Comédiens du Roi had significantly altered. Villiers had retired, and Floridor, Montfleury, and Beauchasteau had died. Also departed were the wives of Montfleury and Villiers, and the Mlles Bellerose and Baron. New to the company were Brécourt (Guillaume Marcoureau) and his wife (Étiennette Des Urlis), Champmeslé (Charles Chevillet) and his wife (Marie Desmares), La Fleur (François Juvenon), Poisson's wife (Victorine Guérin), and the outstanding tragic actress Mlle Dennebault (Françoise Jacob, the daughter of Montfleury). These new company members felt less competitive with Molière, some of them having already been his associates.

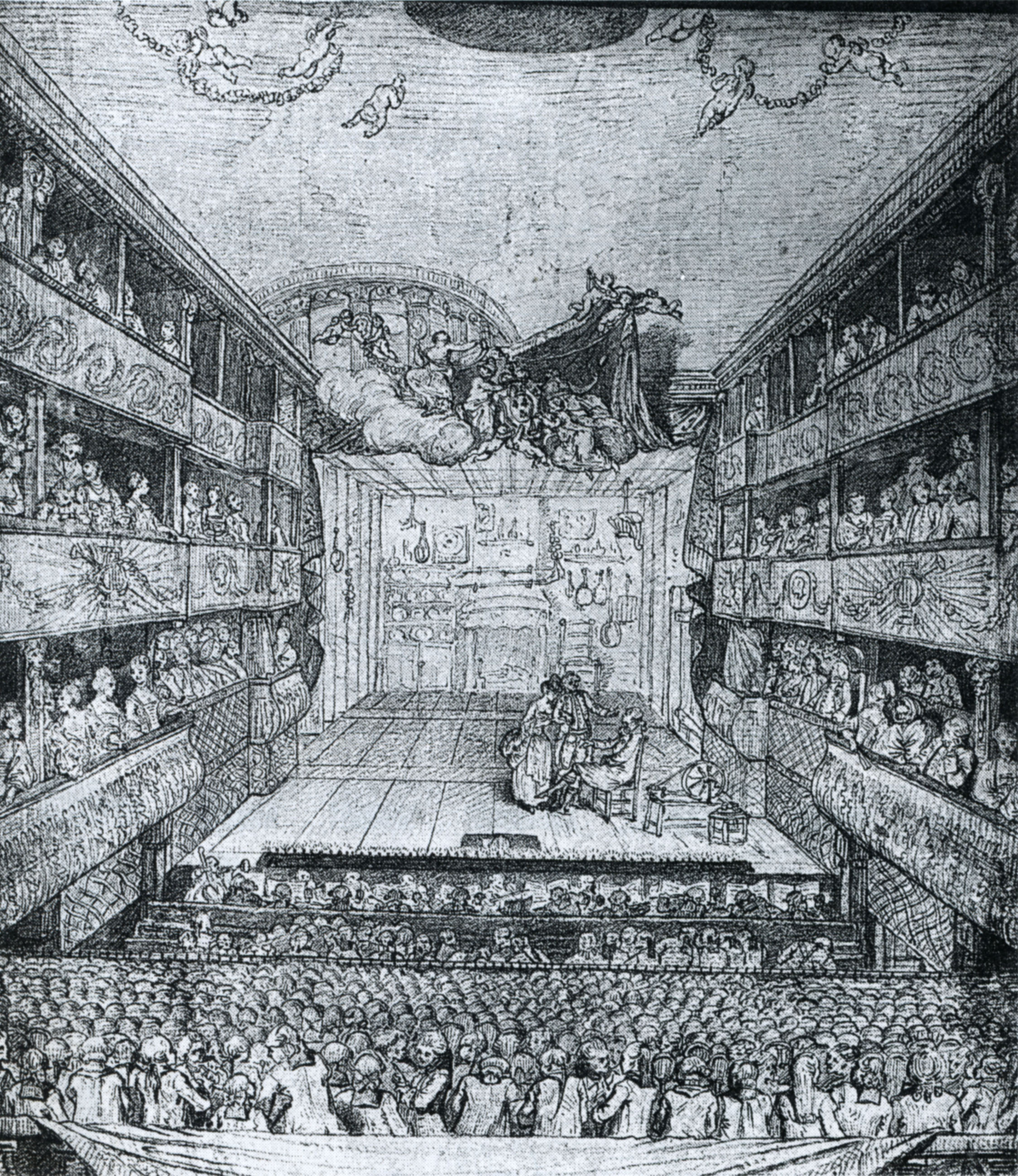
Drawing of the interior of the theatre of the Hôtel de Bourgogne by Pierre A. Wille, the younger (1767).

After Molière's death in 1673, during the Easter break, four actors from Molière's troupe, La Thorillière, Baron (Michel Boyron), and Beauval and his wife (Jeanne Olivier-Bourgignon), departed that company and joined the troupe at the Bourgogne. The struggling troupe from the Marais joined the remnants of the troupe of Molière and moved to the Théâtre Guénégaud. Seven years later in 1680, after La Thorillière had died, Louis XIV ordered the troupe of the Bourgogne to abandon their theatre and join the troupe at the Guénégaud, forming the Comédie-Française.

== Comédie-Italienne ==
With the merger of the Comédiens du Roi and the troupe of the Guénégaud in 1680, the Comédie-Italienne, which had been sharing the Guénégaud with the Troupe du Roi, moved to the now unoccupied Hôtel de Bourgogne. They continued to perform there until 1697, when they produced La Fausse prude. Louis XIV saw the play as a satirical attack on his mistress Madame de Maintenon and ordered the Italians to return to Italy.

After Louis' death in 1715, the Italians were invited back to France by the regent Philippe II, Duke of Orléans, and performed at the Palais-Royal from 18 May 1716 until the Hôtel de Bourgogne had been renovated. They returned to the Bourgogne later that year and continued to perform there until 1762, when the company was merged with the Opéra-Comique of the Théâtre de la Foire. The combined company opened at the Bourgogne on 3 February 1762 and continued to perform in the theatre until 4 April 1783, after which they moved to the new Salle Favart.

The Hôtel de Bourgogne was replaced by a leather market in 1784.

== Bibliography ==
- Banham, Martin (1995). The Cambridge Guide to the Theatre. Cambridge: Cambridge University Press. ISBN 9780521434379.
- Brockett, Oscar G.; Hildy, Franklin J. (2008). History of the Theatre, tenth edition. Boston: Pearson. ISBN 9780205511860.
- Clarke, Jan (1998). The Guénégaud Theatre in Paris (1673–1680). Volume One: Founding, Design and Production. Lewiston, New York: The Edwin Mellen Press. ISBN 9780773483927.
- Deierkauf-Holsboer, S. Wilma (1968). Le théâtre de l'Hôtel de Bourgogne. I. 1548–1635. Paris: A.-G. Nizet. OCLC 542919.
- Deierkauf-Holsboer, S. Wilma (1970). Le théâtre de l'Hôtel de Bourgogne. II. Le théâtre de la troupe royale, 1635–1680. Paris: A.-G. Nizet. OCLC 542919.
- Forman, Edward (2010). Historical Dictionary of French Theater. Lanham: The Scarecrow Press. ISBN 9780810849396.
- Gaines, James F. (2002). The Molière Encyclopedia. Westport, Connecticut: Greenwood Press. ISBN 9780313312557.
- Hartnoll, Phyllis, editor (1983). The Oxford Companion to the Theatre. Oxford: Oxford University Press. ISBN 9780192115461.
- Hervey, Charles (1847). The Theatres of Paris, revised edition. Paris: Galignani. London: John Mitchell. View at Google Books.
- Howarth, William D., ed. (1997). French Theatre in the Neo-Classical Era 1550–1789. Cambridge: Cambridge University Press. ISBN 978-0-521-10087-8 (digital reprint, 2008).
- Lancaster, Henry Carrington (1966). A History of French Dramatic Literature in the Seventeenth Century. Part I: The Pre-Classical Period 1610–1634. New York: Gordian Press. ISBN 9780877520603. OCLC 46954285, 344580. Originally published in 1929.
- Powell, John S. (2000). Music and theatre in France, 1600-1680. Oxford: Oxford University Press. ISBN 9780198165996.
- Roy, Donald (1995). "Hôtel de Bourgogne" in Banham 1995, pp. 498–499.
- Scott, Virginia (2000). Molière: A Theatrical Life. Cambridge: Cambridge University Press. ISBN 9780521782814.
- Wild, Nicole ([1989]). Dictionnaire des théâtres parisiens au XIXe siècle: les théâtres et la musique. Paris: Aux Amateurs de livres. ISBN 978-0-8288-2586-3. ISBN 978-2-905053-80-0 (paperback). View formats and editions at WorldCat.
- Wiley, W. L. (1973). "The Hotel de Bourgogne: Another Look at France's First Public Theatre", Studies in Philology, vol. 70, no. 5, pp. 1–114. JSTOR 4173826.
