= Isaac de Laffemas =

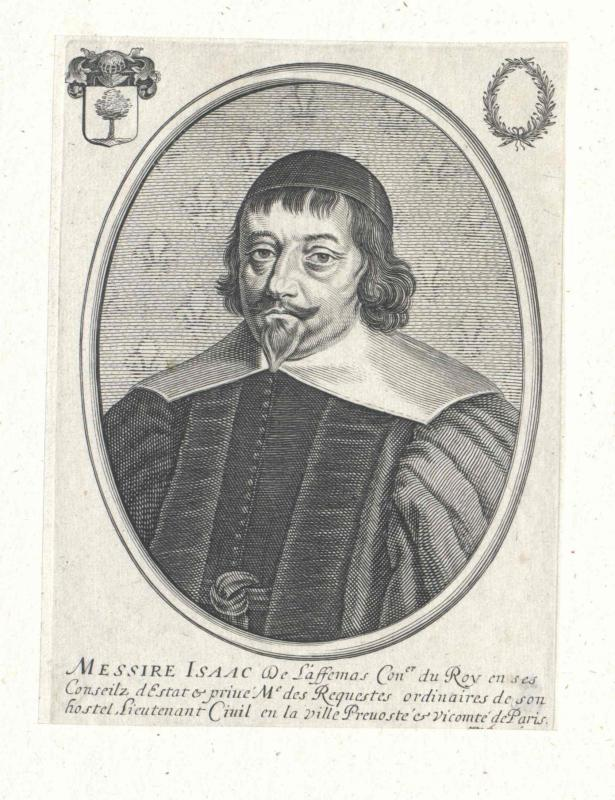
Anonymous, Isaac de Laffemas, 17th-century engraving

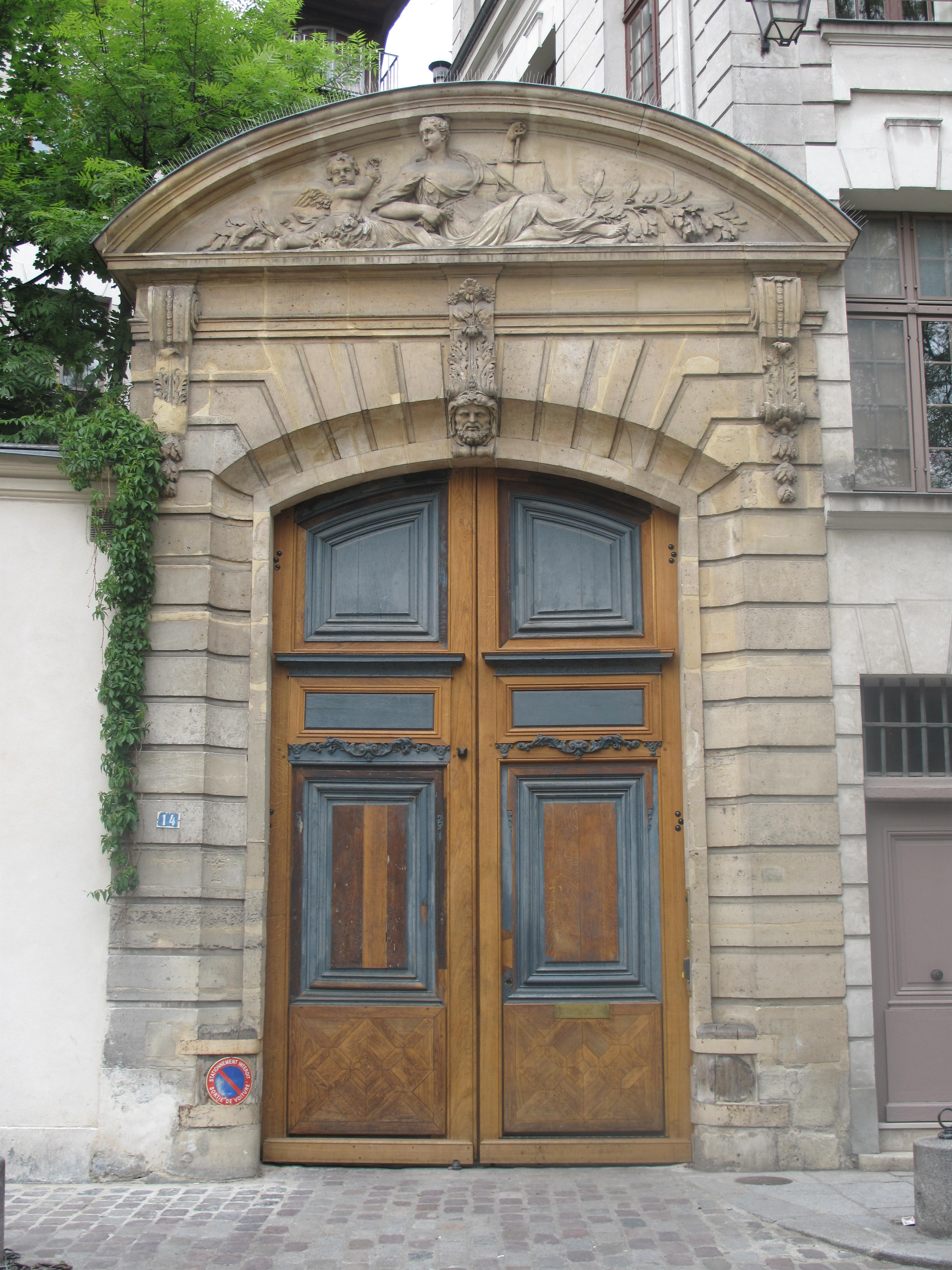
Entrance of hôtel de Laffemas, rue Saint-Julien-le-Pauvre, in Paris.

Isaac de Laffemas (c. 1587 – 16 March 1657, in Paris) was a 17th-century French poet and playwright, lieutenant civil de la prévôté de Paris.

== Biography ==
The son of Barthélemy de Laffemas and Marguerite Lebret, Isaac de Laffemas was first attracted to the theater while his father, Comptroller General of Trade, faced the biggest problems of the regulation of manufacturing and development of sericulture.

A poet and playwright, he wrote several mazarinades.

He composed a theatre play, L'Instabilité des félicités amoureuses, or La Tragi-Pastorale des amours infortunés de Phelemas et de Gaillargeste, published in Rouen in 1605.

Outside the literary field, he also published a Histoire du commerce de France enrichie des plus notables faicts de l'antiquité et du trafic en pays étrangers chez Pierre Pautonnier in 1604.

== Legacy ==
Tallemant des Réaux who had been in conflict with him recognized that he never stole in his intendances.

In Marion Delorme, Victor Hugo recalls its very dark reputation:

Demon, I have seen in thee eyes the sinister flame of this ray of Hell that lit up your soul.

== Descendants ==
Isaac de Laffemas had six children from two marriages including:

- first marriage, with Jeanne de Haultdessens :
  - Guichard de Laffemas, who died a conseiller at the Parlement of Metz in 1701;
  - Laurent de Laffemas, a priest, died in 1655;
  - Jeanne de Laffemas, who married Charles de Fitte, baron de Soucy;
  - Catherine de Laffemas, married to Germain de Courtin, seigneur de Tanqueux, conseiller-secrétaire du roi;
- second marriage, with Charlotte Béquet :
  - Maximilien de Laffemas, seigneur de Saint-Vaucourt, maître d'hôtel du roi;
  - Charlotte de Laffemas, who first married Nicolas Le Sage, seigneur de Sainte-Honorine, conseiller au parlement de Paris, then Guillaume de Beauvais, seigneur de Limeuil, conseiller aux requêtes of the Parlement of Paris, mother of:
    - Nicole-Charlotte Le Sage de Sainte-Honorine, who married Octavien Ondedei, count of Vézelay, in 1656, mother of:
      - Maria Bernarda Ondedei (1661-1751), who married Orazio Albani (1652-1712), brother of Pope Clement XI, mother of:
        - Carlo Albani (1687-1724), prince of Soriano;
        - Annibale Albani, cardinal.

== Publications ==
- Isaac de Laffemas, L'histoire du commerce de France, enrichie des plus notables antiquitez du trafic des païs estranges, 1606
