= Mademoiselle Beauval =

French actress

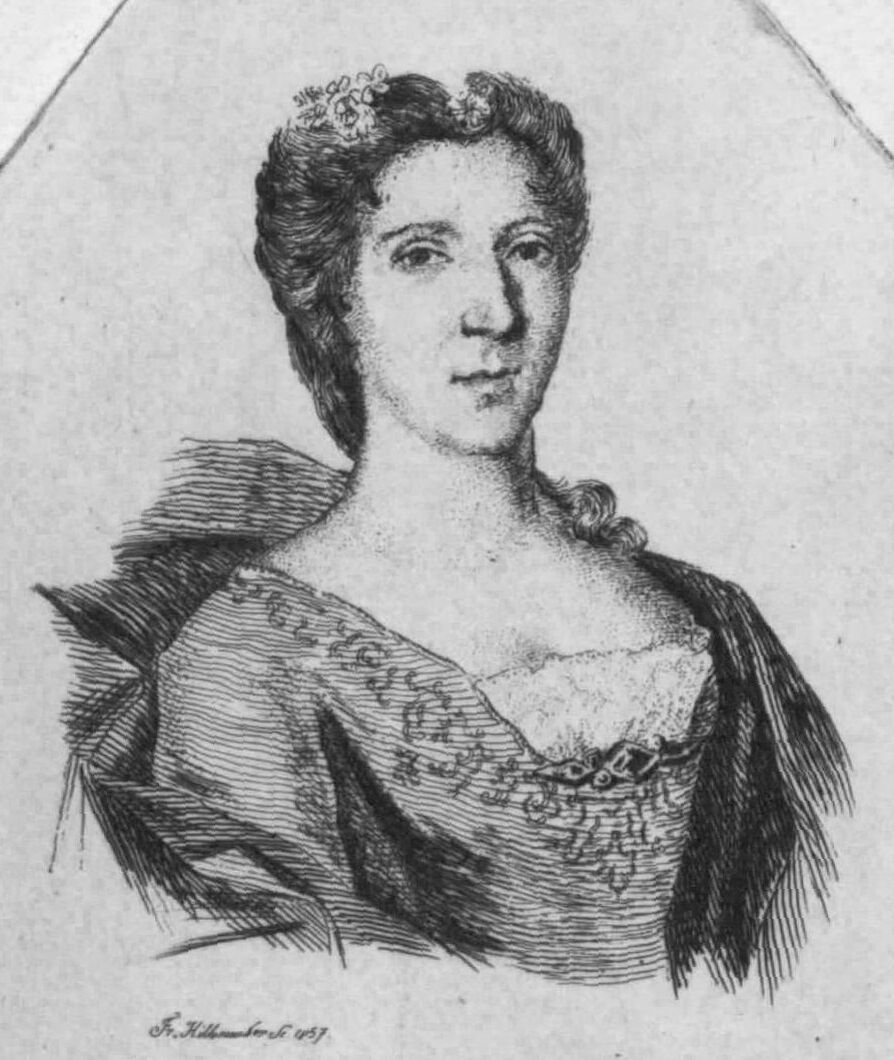
Jeanne Olivier Bourguignon in 1908

Jeanne Olivier Bourguignon, stage name Mademoiselle Beauval (1648 – 1720), was a French stage actress.

She was engaged at the Molière's company in 1670. She became a Sociétaires of the Comédie-Française in 1680 and retired in 1704. She was a famous soubrette.
