= Tour Jean-sans-Peur =

Coordinates: 48.864284°N 2.34809°E

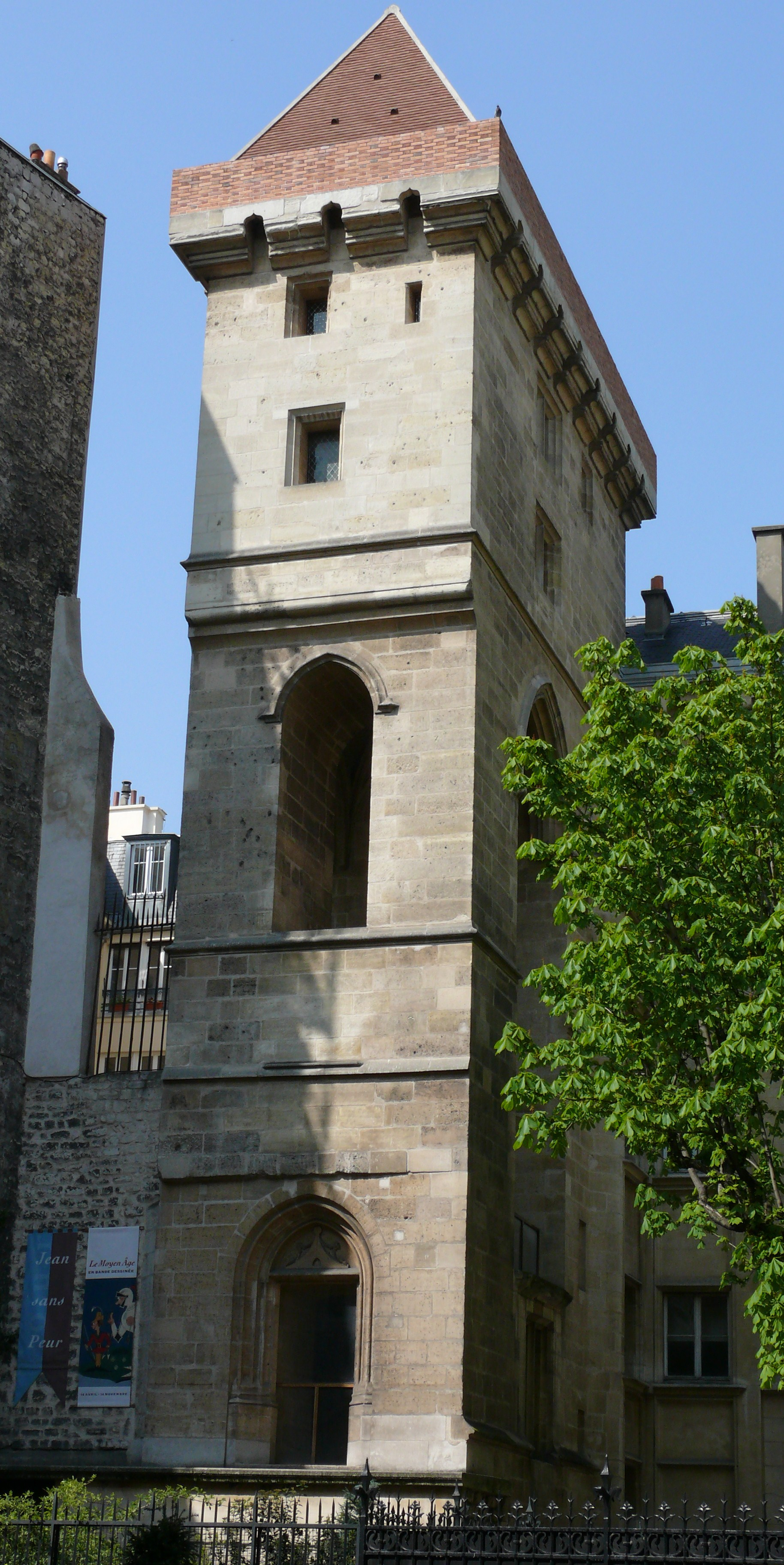
Tour Jean-sans-Peur

The Tour Jean-sans-Peur or Tour de Jean sans Peur (French pronunciation: [tuʁ də ʒɑ̃ sɑ̃ pœʁ], Tower of John the Fearless), located in the 2nd arrondissement of Paris, is the last vestige of the Hôtel de Bourgogne ([otɛl də buʁɡɔɲ]), the residence first of the Counts of Artois and then the Dukes of Burgundy. The tower contained bed chambers and the grand stairway of the original residence, which stood next to it. It was completed between 1409–1411 by Jean sans Peur. The original hôtel occupied about a hectare of land, the boundaries of which are now marked by the rues Étienne Marcel, Montorgueil, Saint-Sauveur, and Saint-Denis. The tower itself is located at 20 rue Étienne Marcel, in the courtyard of an elementary school. It is one of the best surviving examples of medieval residential architecture in Paris. The tower is open to the public and presents changing expositions on life in the Middle Ages.

== History ==
=== The Hôtel d'Artois ===
The first hôtel particulier or manor, on the site was built by the Counts of Artois, whose domains included most of northern France and Flanders. In 1270, Robert II, Count of Artois, the nephew of king Louis IX, known as "Saint Louis", bought several houses and about a hectare of land in the northern part of the city, adjacent to the wall of Philippe Auguste, the first city wall of Paris, which had been built between 1190, and 1290. Part of the land was outside the wall, the other part within Paris. As the city grew, a new wall built by Charles V, completed in 1383, brought the entire property within the city limits. Little is known about this first hôtel, which was largely rebuilt by its later owners.

=== Residence of Dukes of Burgundy ===
In 1369, the hôtel passed to Philip the Bold, the Duke of Burgundy, by his marriage to Marguerite, the Countess of Flanders and of Artois. The records of the concierge of the house show that between July 1371, and Easter 1375, he carried out important construction works, including the building of a tower. After Philip's death in 1404, it became the property of Jean de Bourgogne, better known as Jean sans Peur, or John the Fearless.

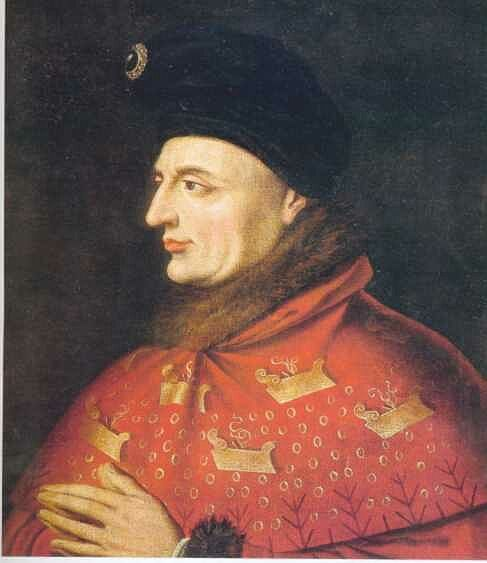
Jean sans Peur

The construction of the tower took place during the Hundred Years' War (1337–1453), when the kings of France and England fought for supremacy in France. Paris was also a battleground of the Armagnac–Burgundian Civil War (1404–1435). Beginning in 1392, king Charles VI suffered increasingly from madness, and two branches of the royal family fought over who would rule the country: the Armagnacs, supporters of the king's brother, Louis d'Orléans, and the Burgundians, led by his cousin, the new Duke of Burgundy, Jean sans Peur. On November 23, 1407, just as it appeared that the Armagnacs had triumphed, Louis d'Orléans was murdered on the street by men in the pay of Jean sans Peur. In 1408, Jean quickly regained favor by leading a successful military campaign in Flanders, and was forgiven by the king, who made him the guardian of his heir, the dauphin, Louis, Duke of Guyenne.

To celebrate his triumph and to display his wealth and power, between 1409, and 1411, Jean built a palatial new residence, attached to a tower, which contained both a grand spiral staircase which gave access to the main building, a large hall and, at the top of a separate narrow winding stairway, to private chambers. The Chronicle of Enguerrand de Monstrelet (c. 1400-1444) reported: "In this time a force of workers made for John a strong chamber of well-crafted stone, in the form of a tower, and there he slept at night. This tower had the advantage of keeping him safe.". The records of his concierge show that the additions to the hôtel, costing 10,000 livres, were made between February 1409 and May 1411, requiring the Duke to obtain several loans from wealthy Parisians. Although the base of the tower may have been built by his father, the upper part was probably built by Jean sans Peur.

From 1409 to 1413, Jean sans Peur conducted his fight against the Armagnacs from his fortified residence. He had his own unofficial militia, called the Cabochiens, made up of butchers, knackers and other workers of the powerful butcher corporation Grande Boucherie Saint-Jacques. However, the opposition to his rule grew so strong that he was forced to flee Paris in 1413. He returned in triumph in 1418, but in 1419, he was murdered by his opponents on the bridge of Montereau, under the eyes of the new Dauphin, the future Charles VII.

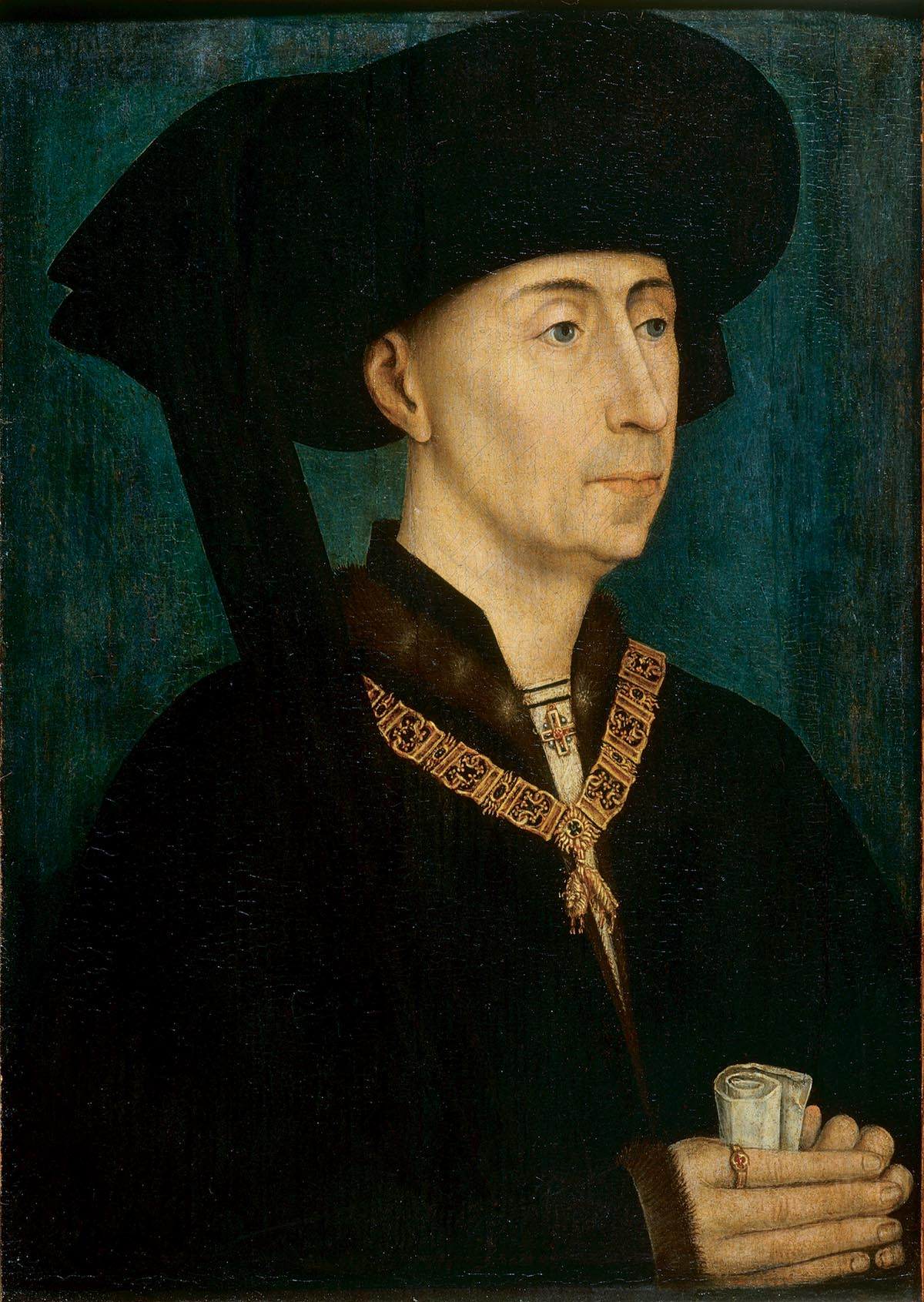
Philip the Good by Rogier van der Weyden (about 1450)

The residence was inherited by his son, Philip the Good, but the new Duke spent very little time there, dividing his time between his palaces in Dijon, Brussels, Lille, and other cities in his duchy. During his reign, Burgundy reached to the height of its glory; he greatly expanded its territory, conquering most of the Netherlands and buying the Duchy of Luxemburg. During one campaign, his soldiers captured Joan of Arc, and handed her over to the English, who were his allies at the time. He was a famous patron of the arts, commissioning works from Jan van Eyck and other Flemish masters, and he spent a large portion of the Duchy's income on gold cloth, silk and other fabrics for his wardrobe. He only returned permanently in 1461, after an absence of twenty-six years, when king Louis XI returned to Paris. Thereafter, he entertained lavishly, holding banquets under a large tent of velours and silk erected in the garden. On these occasions, the walls of the tower were decorated from tapestries from Arras, in his province of Flanders. The old city wall of Philippe Auguste, was still in good condition and was connected to the tower by a doorway on the first floor, still visible. According to one chronicle of the time, Philippe le Bon was able to travel from the tower to the Hôtel de Soissons, near Les Halles, without setting foot on the city streets.

After his death in 1467, the duchy and house became the property of his son, Charles the Bold, though the new duke never lived in the house. He chose to live in the Tour de Nesle, a fortified residence on the left bank across the Seine from the Palais de la Cité, which had been given to him by Louis XI. The new duke allied himself first with the King of France, then conspired against him. Charles the Bold was killed in battle against the army of the Duke of Lorraine and the Swiss in January 1477. He had no sons, and the title of Duke of Burgundy died with him. Louis XI took possession of the province of Burgundy, and of the Hôtel de Bourgogne.

=== The Renaissance and the first Paris theater ===
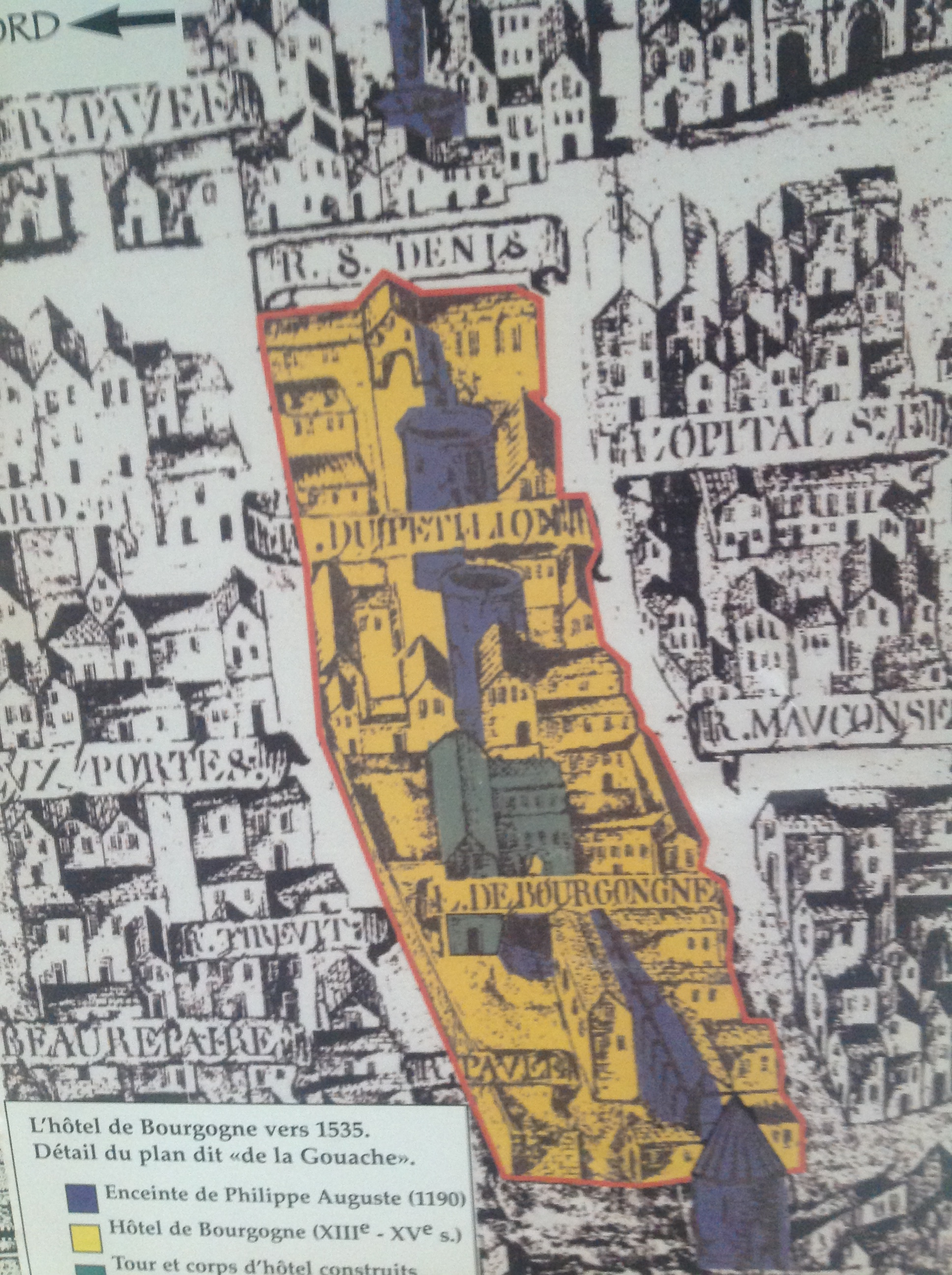
De la Gouache map of Paris showing the wall of Philippe Auguste and the hôtel de Bourgogne in about 1535

The kings of France had no need for an additional residence in the city. In 1539, Francis I gave the hôtel to one of his allies, Diego de Mendoza, but four years later changed his mind and sold the property. It was divided into twenty lots, separated by a new street, rue Françoise (named after the King François I, now rue Française). In 1543, the tower and surrounding lots were purchased for 5200 livres tournois by a Paris merchant named Jean Rouvert, who had pioneered industry of floating lumber down the Seine to Paris.

In 1548, he sold a parcel of the land measuring 16 by 17 toises on rue Mauconseil to the first authorized theater troupe in Paris, the Confrérie de la Passion. A theater building, often simply called the Hôtel de Bourgogne, was constructed. It was the first permanent theater building in Paris and was used until 1783, after which it was replaced by a leather market. Only the outer walls were preserved. In 1866, the old building was torn down to make way for the construction of rue Étienne Marcel.

=== Ruin and restoration ===
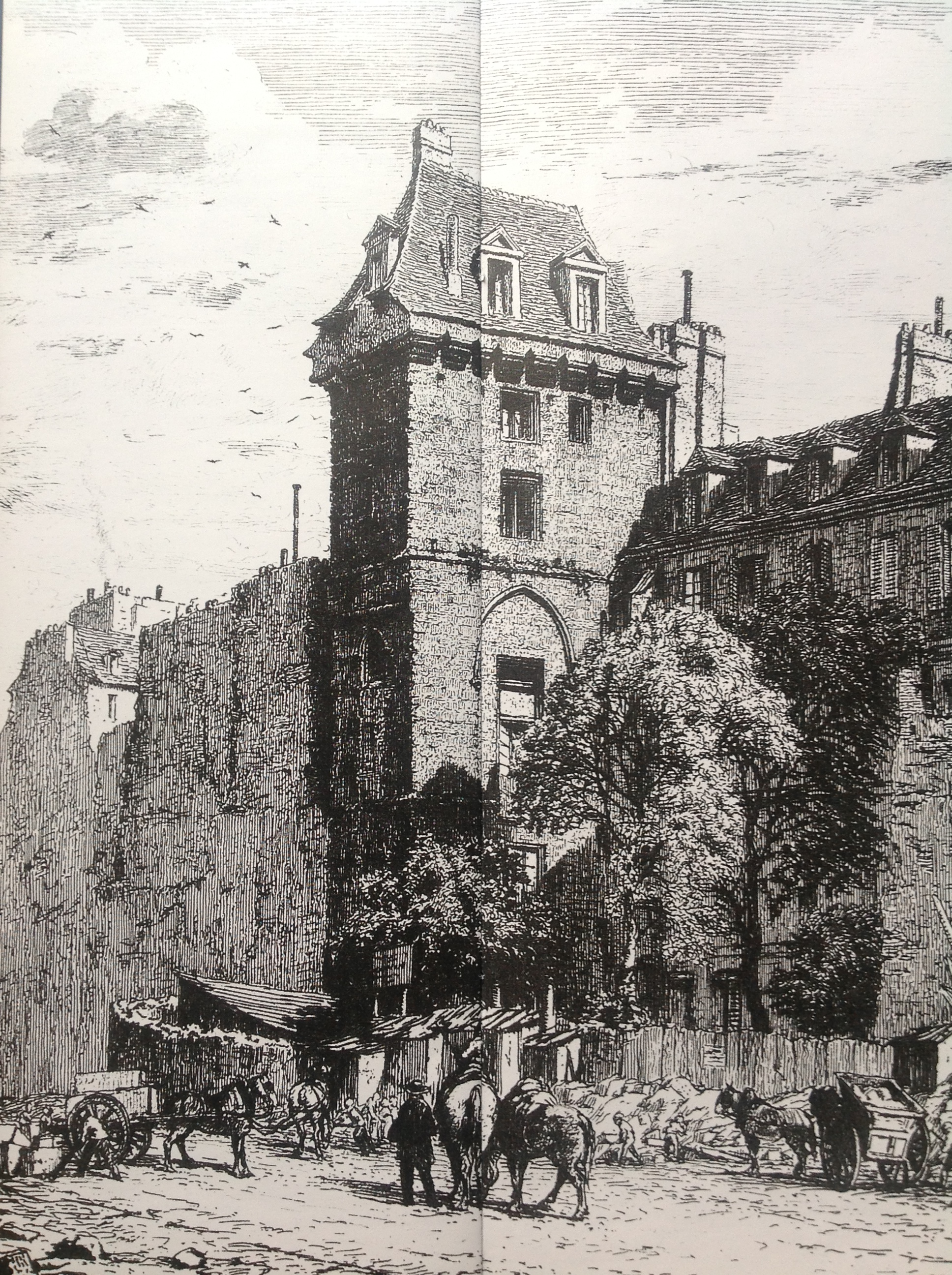
The Tour Jean sans Peur in 1882, after the construction of rue Étienne Marcel in 1867

The tower itself was uninhabited throughout a large part of the 17th century. Vincent de Paul opened a charitable institution there to distribute food to the needy of the quarter. In the second half of the century it was owned by Germain Courtin, the secretary of Louis XIV. He rented the lower part of the tower for a cabaret, which enjoyed considerable success. In the first part of the 18th century, a large part of the hôtel became a private house, while the tower, with the installation of stoves in the rooms, was made into a lodging house. In 1782, the tower and adjacent buildings were bought by Charles-Louis Sterlin, a wealthy hardware merchant, who installed his residence, storeroom, workshop and sales room. Some of his workers inhabited the rooms of the tower. The business was taken over in 1832 by one of his employees, Eugène Bricard, who turned it into a well-known manufactory of locks. It remained in business until 1871.

In the meanwhile, the grand reconstruction of the center of Paris by Napoleon III and Baron Haussmann dramatically altered the neighborhood. In 1868, the construction of rue Étienne Marcel caused the demolition of the other parts of the hôtel, leaving the tower standing alone, and removing the buildings which had blocked the view of the tower from the south. The tower soon attracted the attention of architectural historians and preservationists. The tower was purchased by the City of Paris in 1874, and was declared a historical monument in 1884. In the meanwhile, between 1875 and 1878, an elementary school was constructed just to the east of the tower, resting on the foundations of the medieval hôtel. The stone western wall of the school is all that remains of the old grand logis of the hôtel.

Major restoration projects were proposed in the succeeding years, but it was not until 1893, that work was begun under the architect Gion, aimed mainly at stabilizing and strengthening the upper structure. The medieval lucarnes, or attic windows, were removed. In 1991, and 1992, another important restoration was made by the architect P. Prunet. The tower was returned to its original medieval appearance, with the exception of the roof, which lost its medieval chimney and baccula. The tower opened to the public in 1999, thanks to the sponsorship of a private association, Les Amis de la Tour de Jean sans Peur.

== Description ==
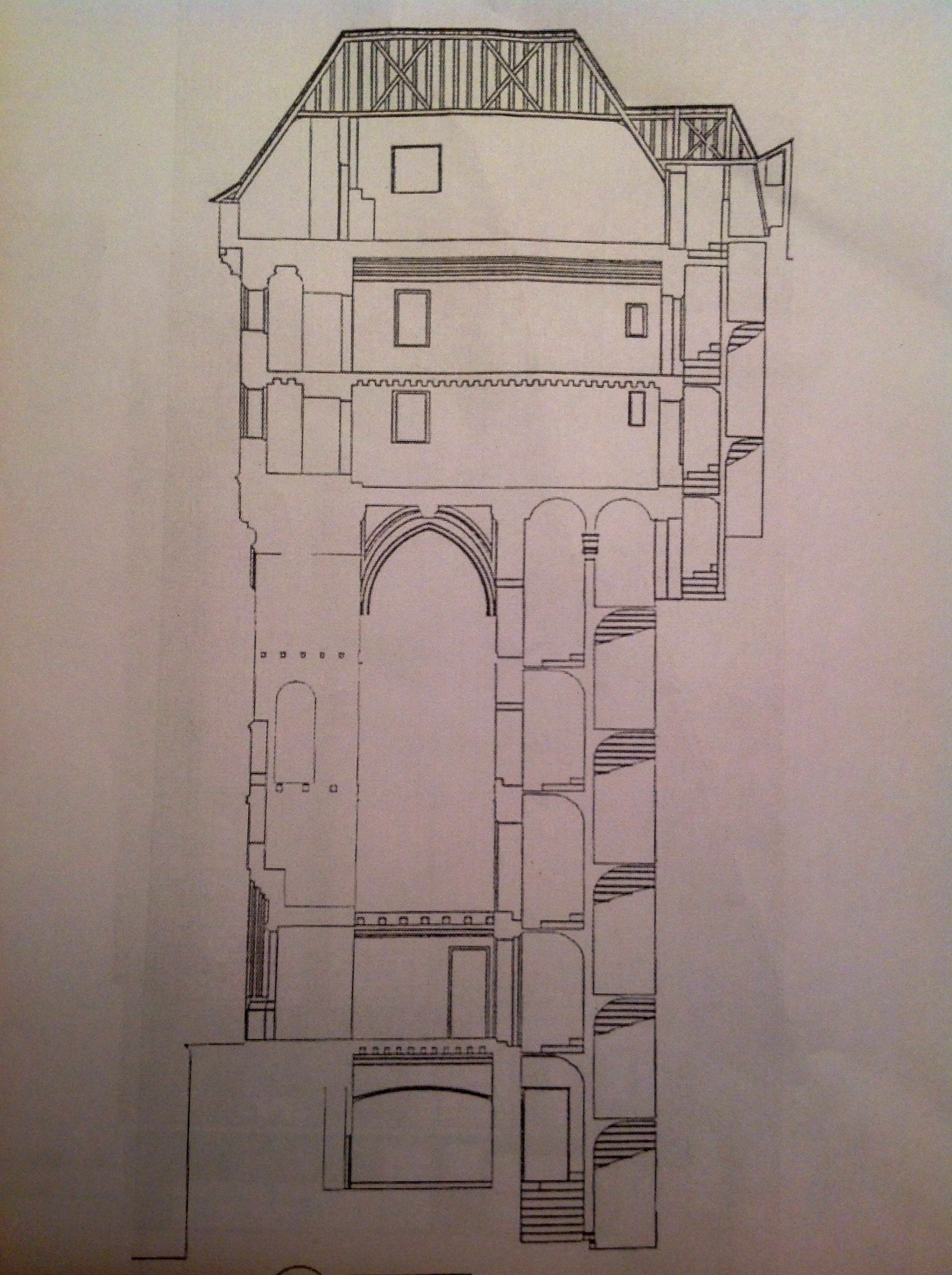
Diagram of the interior of the tower after the 1990 restoration

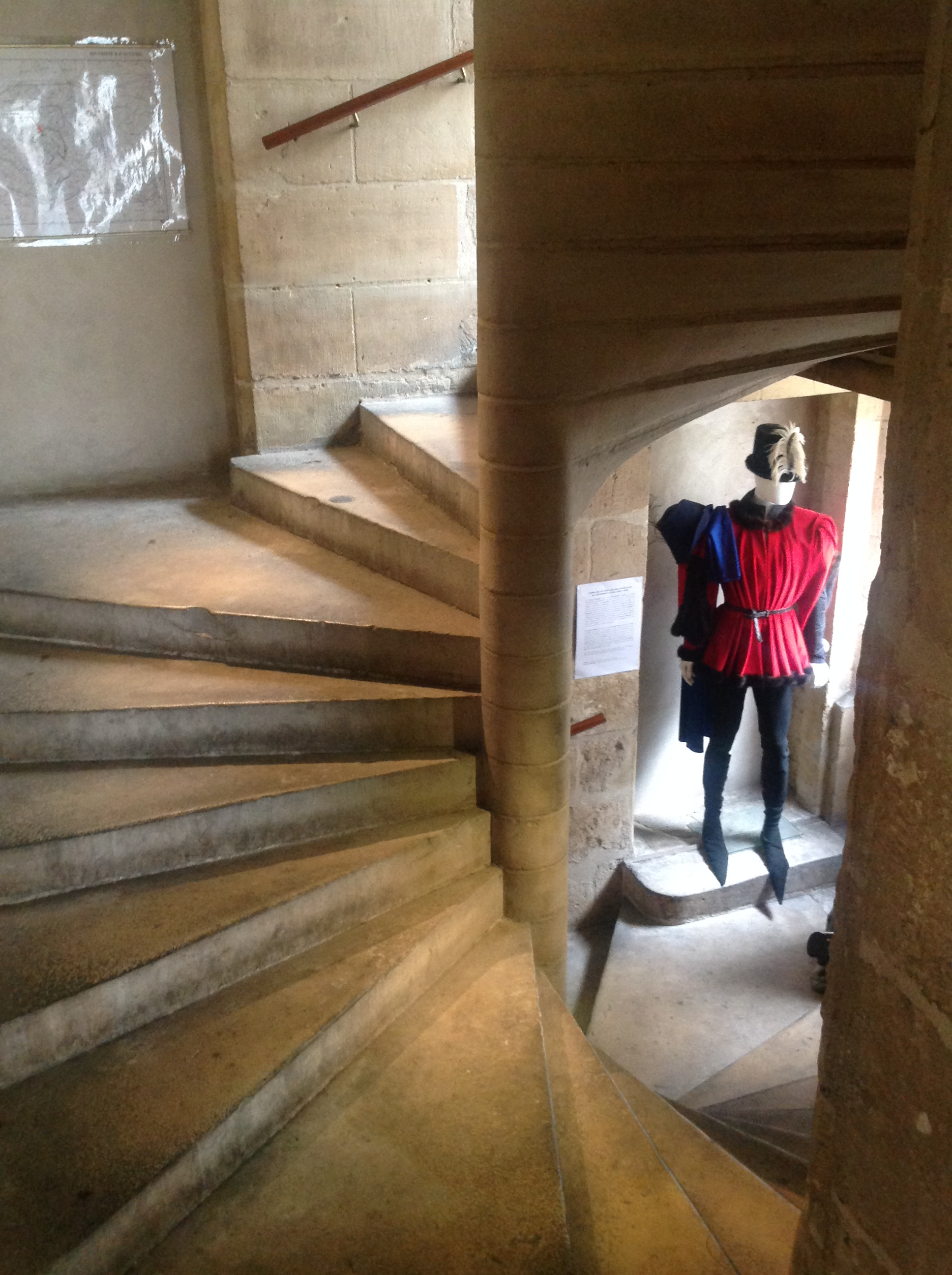
Main stairway of the tower from the lower floors

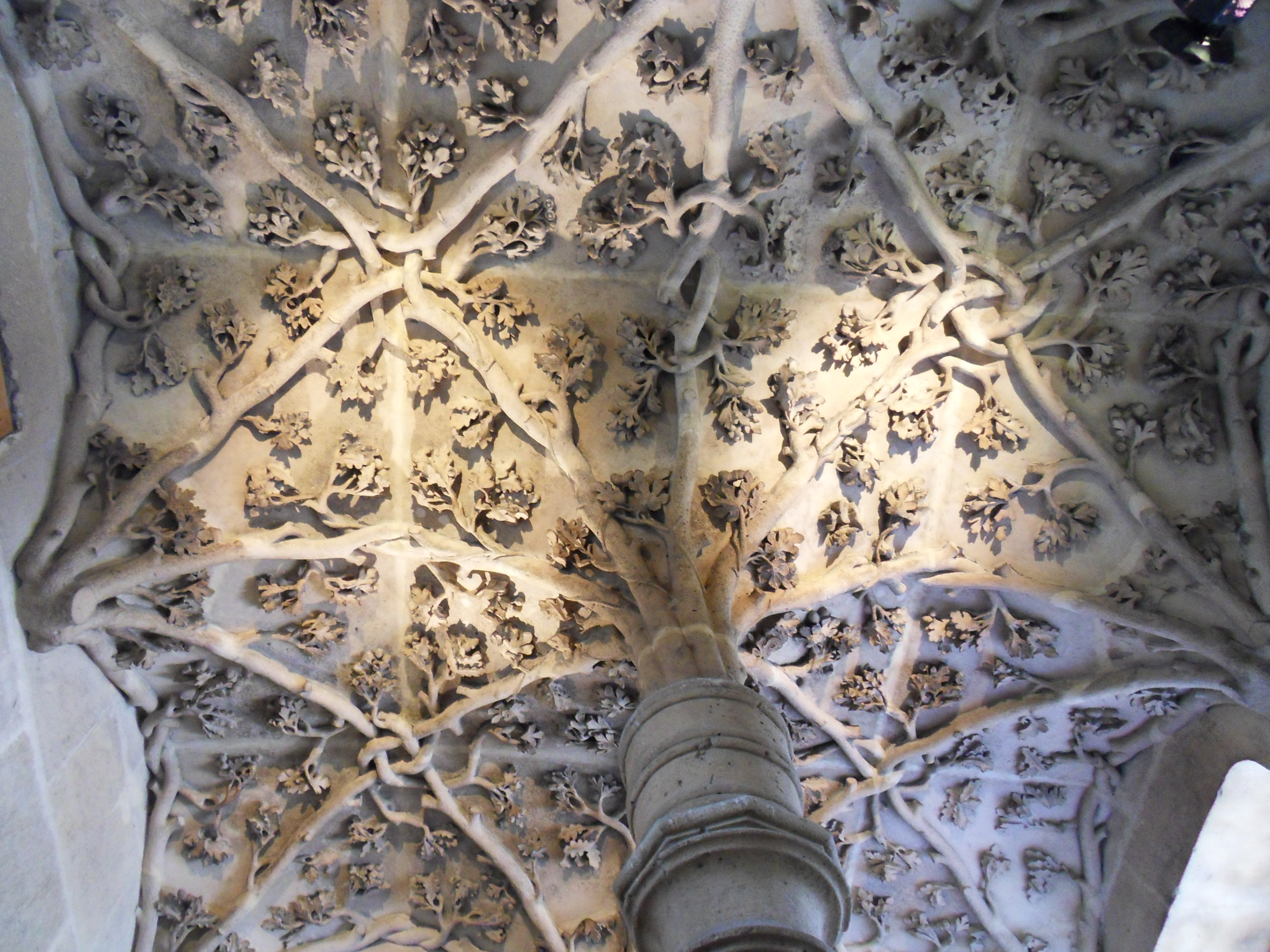
The sculpture at the top of the main stairway, with the intertwined emblems of Jean sans Peur and the House of Burgundy

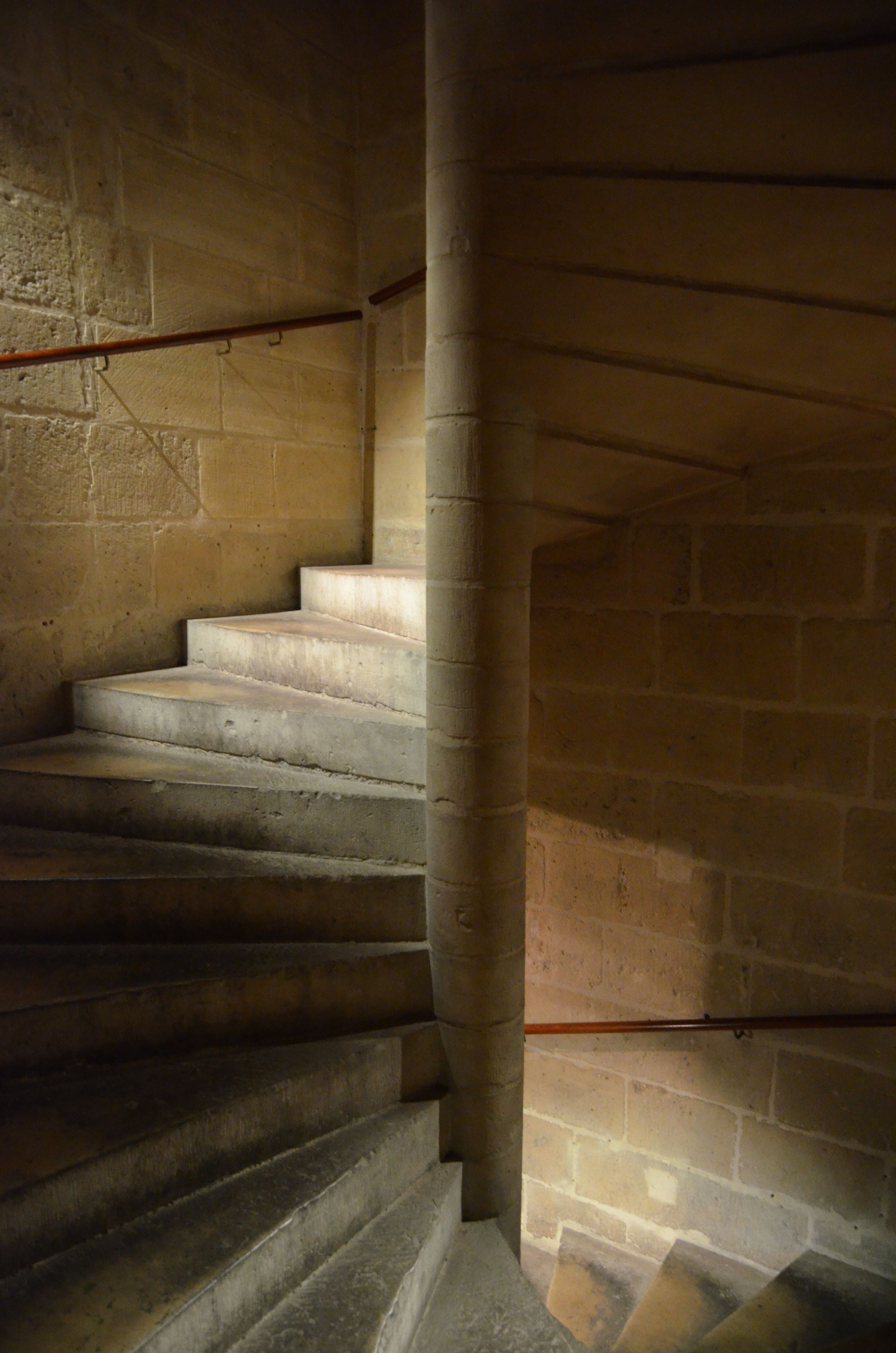
the narrow winding stairway to the upper chambers of the tower

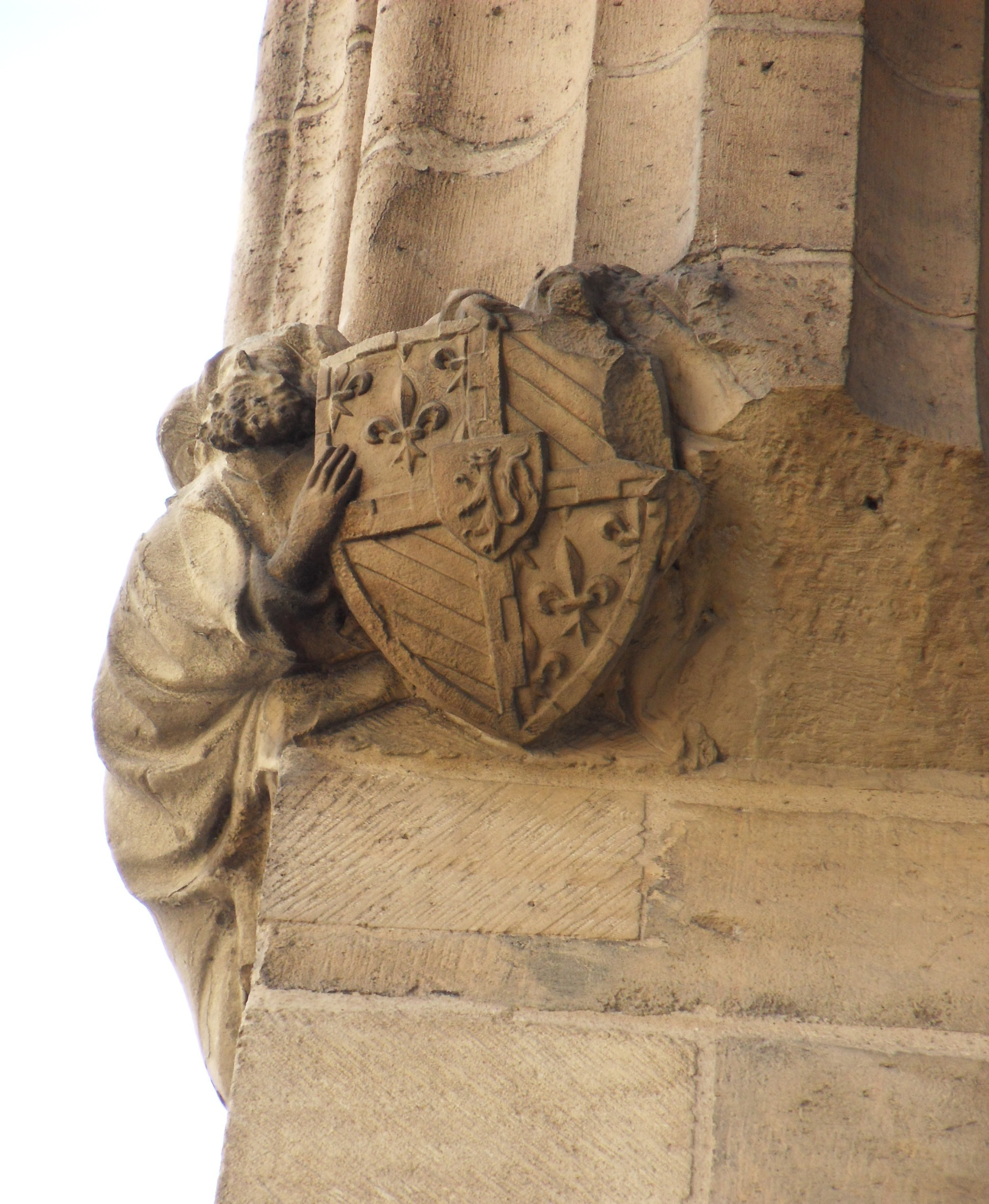
An angel carrying Jean sans Peur's coat of arms, in the large hall

The tower of Jean sans Peur was never meant to stand alone; it was attached to a larger building, the grand corps of the Hôtel de Bourgogne, and served as main stairway, as well as a secure residential building. In this it was similar to, though smaller than, another medieval tower of the period, the massive tower of the Château de Vincennes.

The tower of Jean sans Peur had a largely symbolic purpose; to show the power and authority of the House of Burgundy over the family of his chief rival, Louis of Orléans. Aside from church towers and the massive central tower of the Louvre palace, it was the tallest structure in the center of the city. It had some defensive features: its height, thick walls, narrow winding stairway and the machicolations high on the tower, from which objects or burning oil could be dropped on attackers; but much of this seems to have been more decorative than practical, the numerous large openings and square shape of the tower, and its location in the center of the city, would have made it difficult to defend against a military attack. Unlike a typical fortress tower, the interior was richly and lavishly decorated with carved stone, and the bed chambers in the tower were luxurious for the time, with large windows and heated latrines.

The tower, twenty-seven meters high, is attached to the wall of Philippe Auguste, and originally stood on the courtyard of the Hôtel de Bourgogne, and served as its entrance. Above the tower's main entrance is a much-eroded allegory of the "triumph of the House of Burgundy over Orléans and his clan." The entrance to the tower was on the east side.

=== The main stairway and the large hall ===
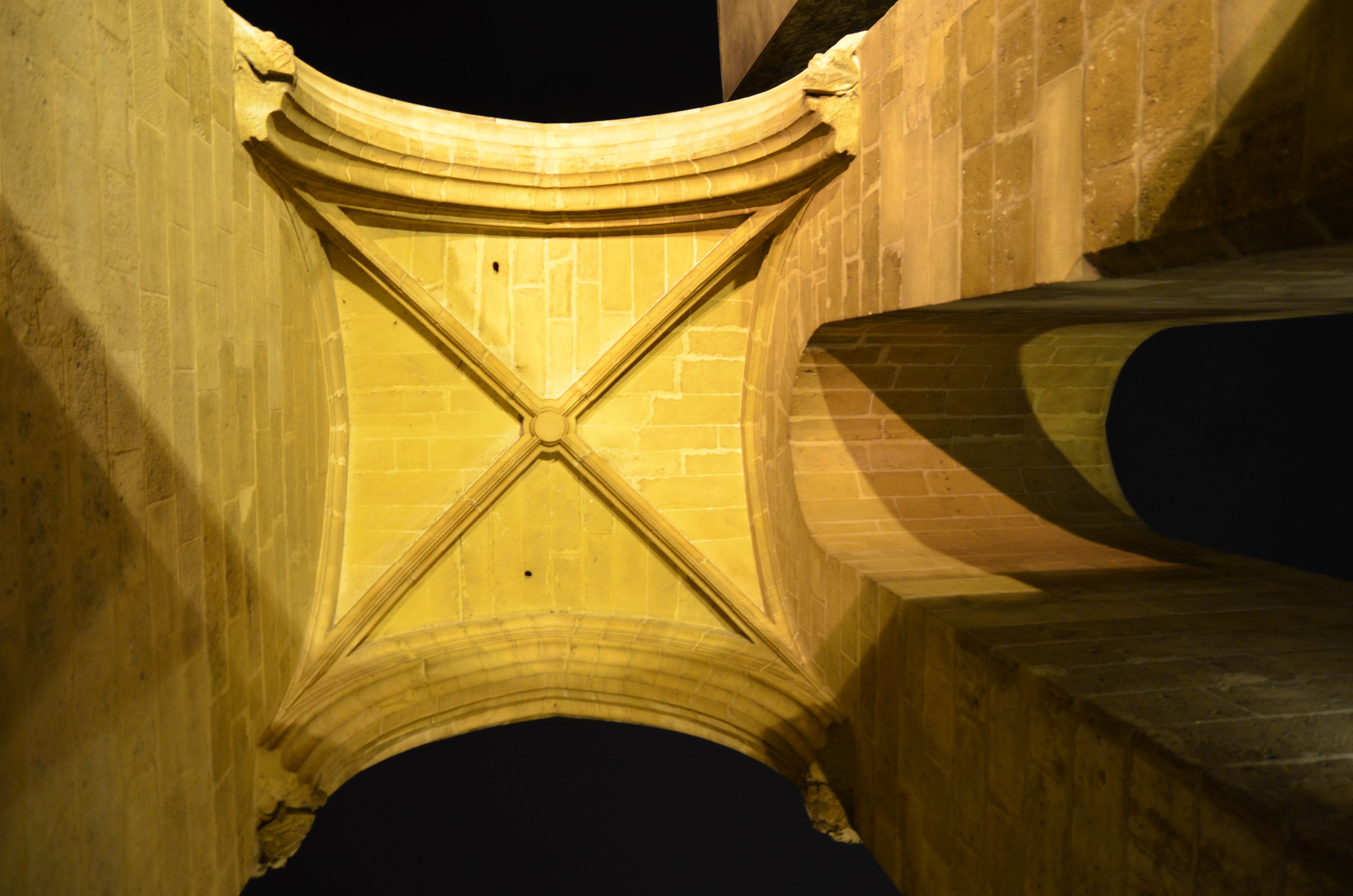
The vaulted ceiling of the largest chamber, nine meters high, open on three sides

The tower served as the main stairway for the grand corps of the hôtel; it was attached to south wall of the larger building. A grand circular stairway occupies nine square meters, and, like other grand palace stairways of the time, has wide bays so people could be seen coming up and down. It climbs 17 meters. The former entrances to the grand corps are now blocked, since only the wall remains; it is now the wall of the elementary school next door. Persons coming from the outside could not go directly to the grand stairway; they had to climb by a separate stairway to the next floor up. The room on the ground floor was connected by a large archway with an adjoining building, two stories high, equipped with latrines.

On the first floor above the ground floor, one doorway connected with the first floor of the grand corps in the adjoining hôtel to the north, while another doorway gave entrance to the top of the wall of Philippe Auguste to the south of the tower. Over the doorway is a carving of another emblem of the Duke, a level and a plane.

On the second floor is the largest chamber in the tower, nine meters high, opening on three sides. The chamber is covered with a quadripartite rib vault with springing points (on the outer walls) decorated with angels carrying Jean sans Peur's coat of arms. Its main function seems to have been simply to hold up the upper rooms on top of it, though it may also have contained a bell.

The grand stairway continues upwards. At the top of the stairway is a chamber with the most celebrated decorative element in the tower, a vault decorated with carved stone vegetation. (See decoration). In the Middle Ages this chamber gave access to a small balcony with a view of the façade of the main building. The chamber also gives access to a narrower winding stairway which leads upwards to two private chambers.

=== The upper rooms ===
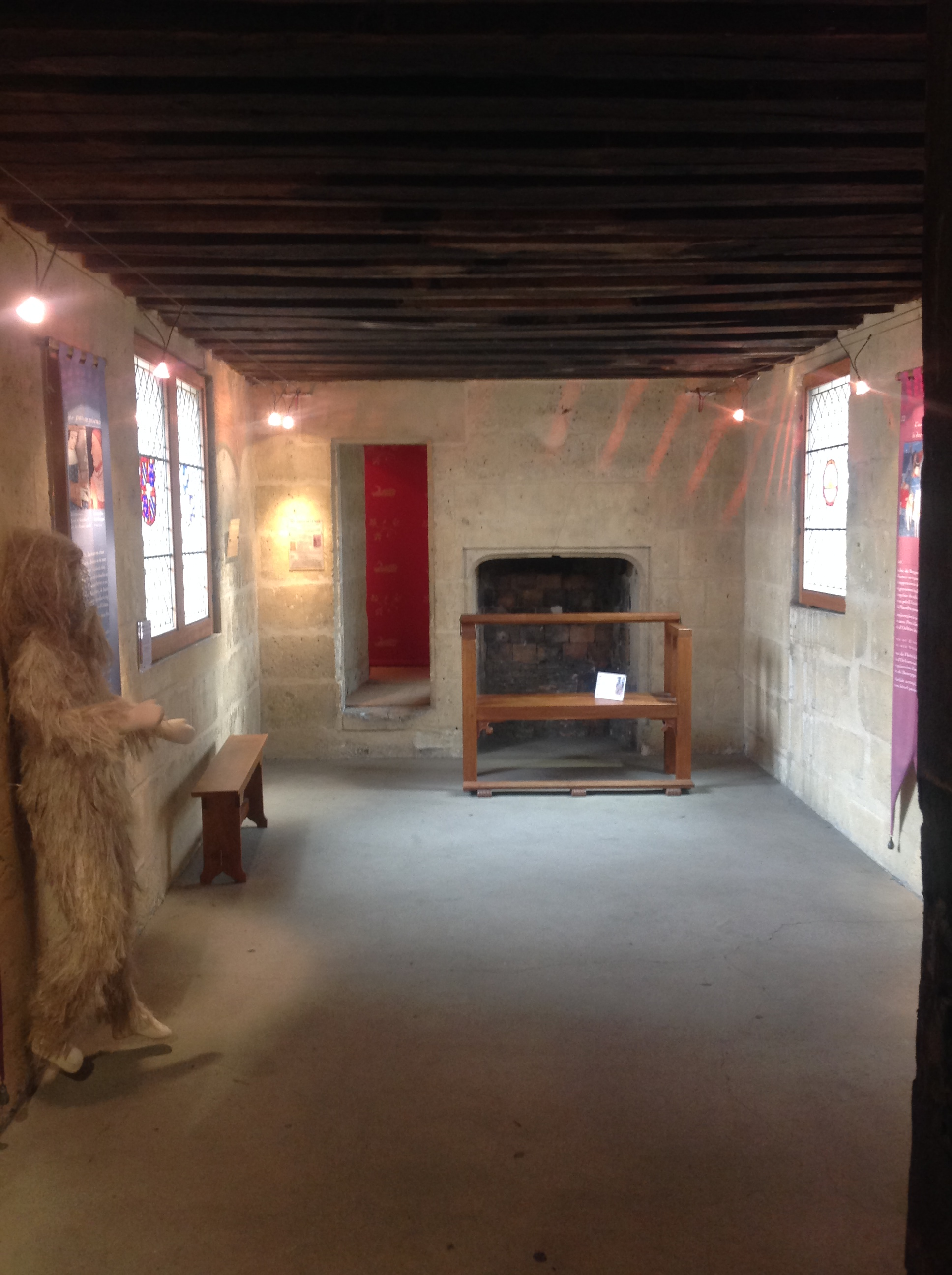
The lower of the two chambers in the tower. The door to the left of the fireplace led to the latrine.

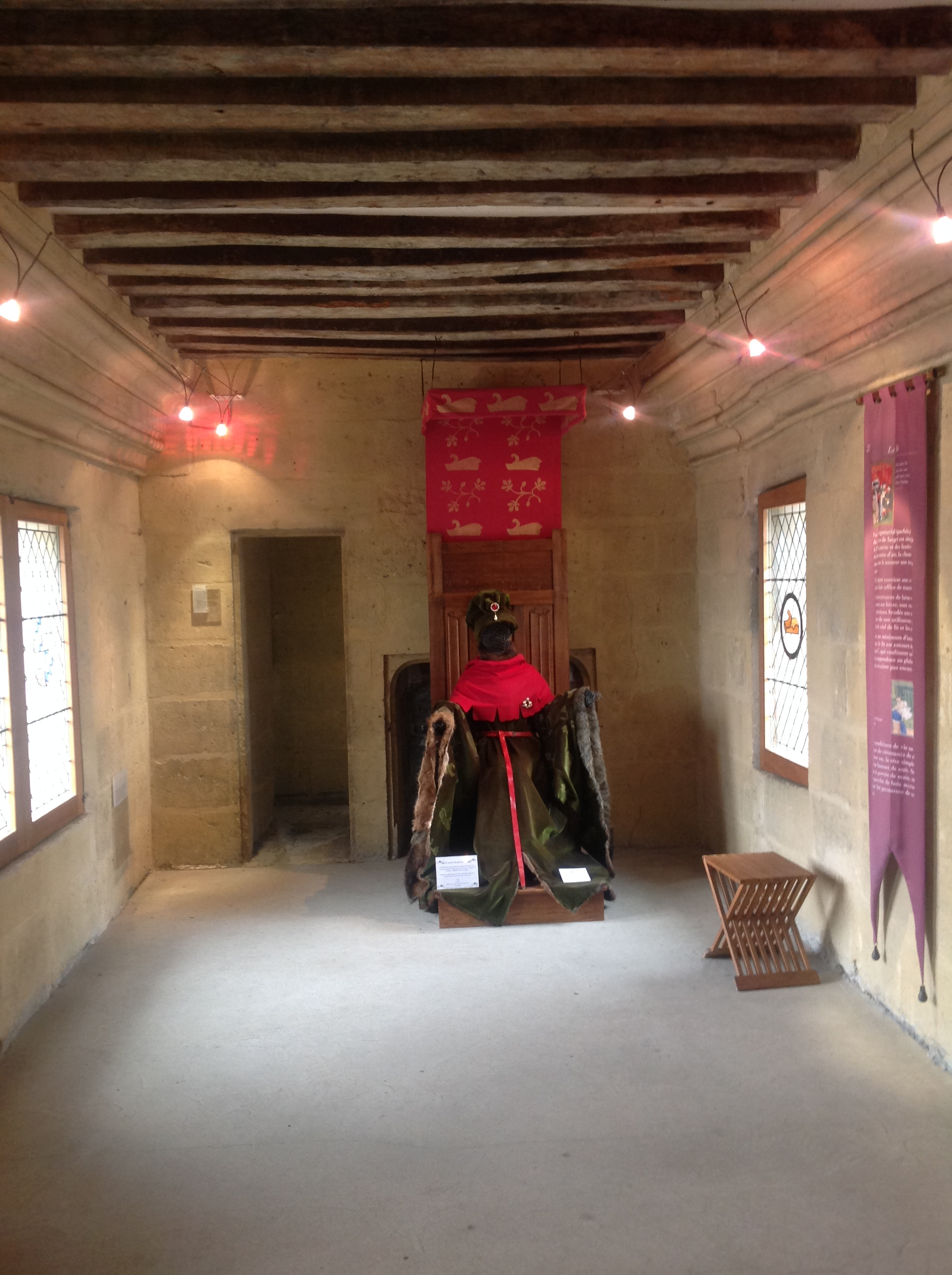
The upper chamber of the tower, known as the chamber of Jean sans Peur

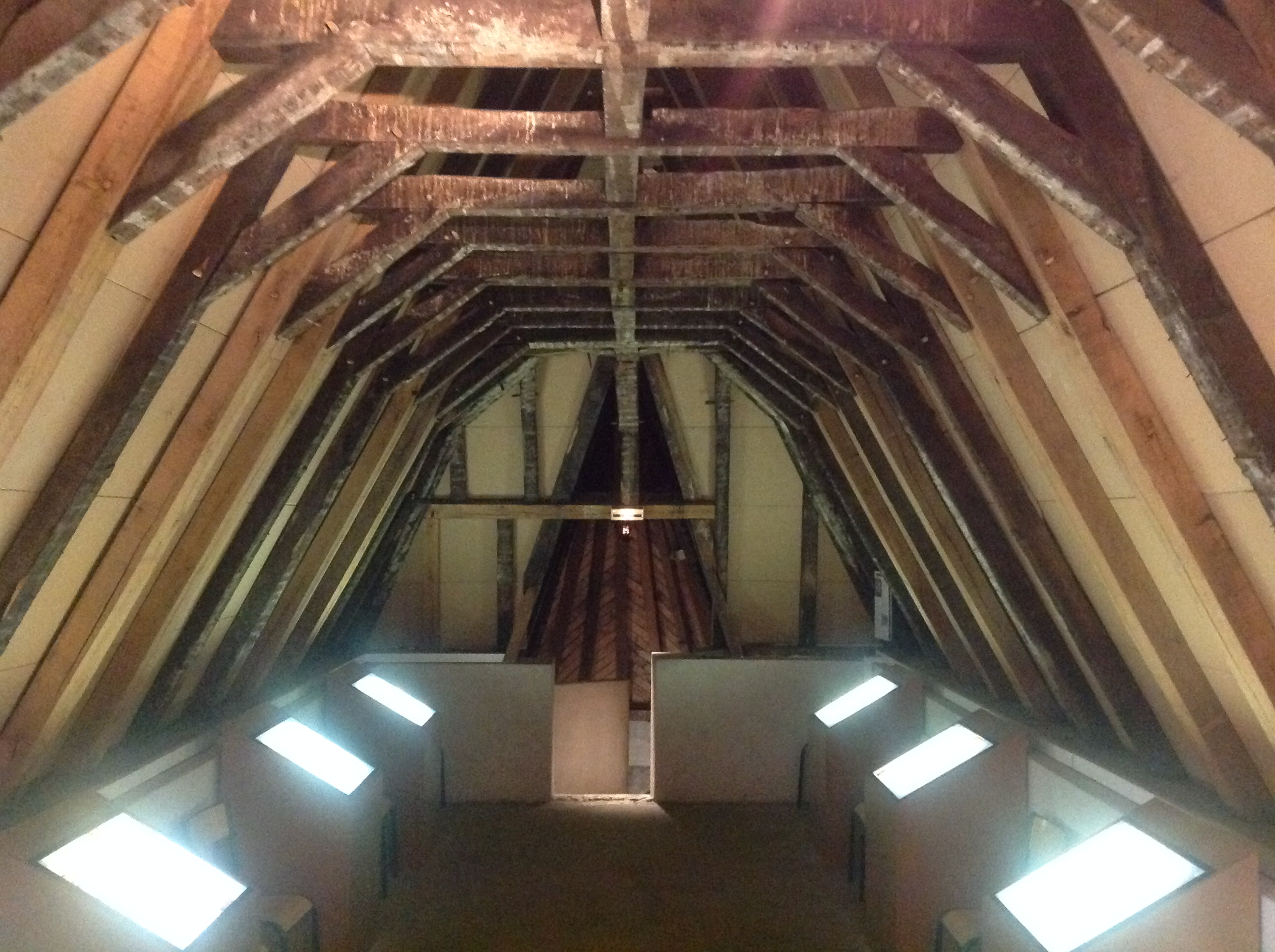
The top room under the roof, with some of the original roof beams

The narrow stairway leads to two chambers, the first known as the chamber of the Ecuyer and the upper room as the chamber of Jean sans Peur. Both of these rooms have sophisticated latrines, heated by the backs of chimneys, with conduits for evacuation and ventilation installed inside the south wall. The rooms had wide windows with views over the city. They could have been used as bedchambers, or as private offices, similar to the private study of Charles V at the Château de Vincennes.

On the top floor is a smaller and simpler room, most likely that of the watchman, located under the wooden frame of the roof, and lit by five windows. It still has some of its original timber framework, and the openings of machicolations. It was first restored in 1894, and then again in 1991-92, with a new roof.

=== Decoration ===
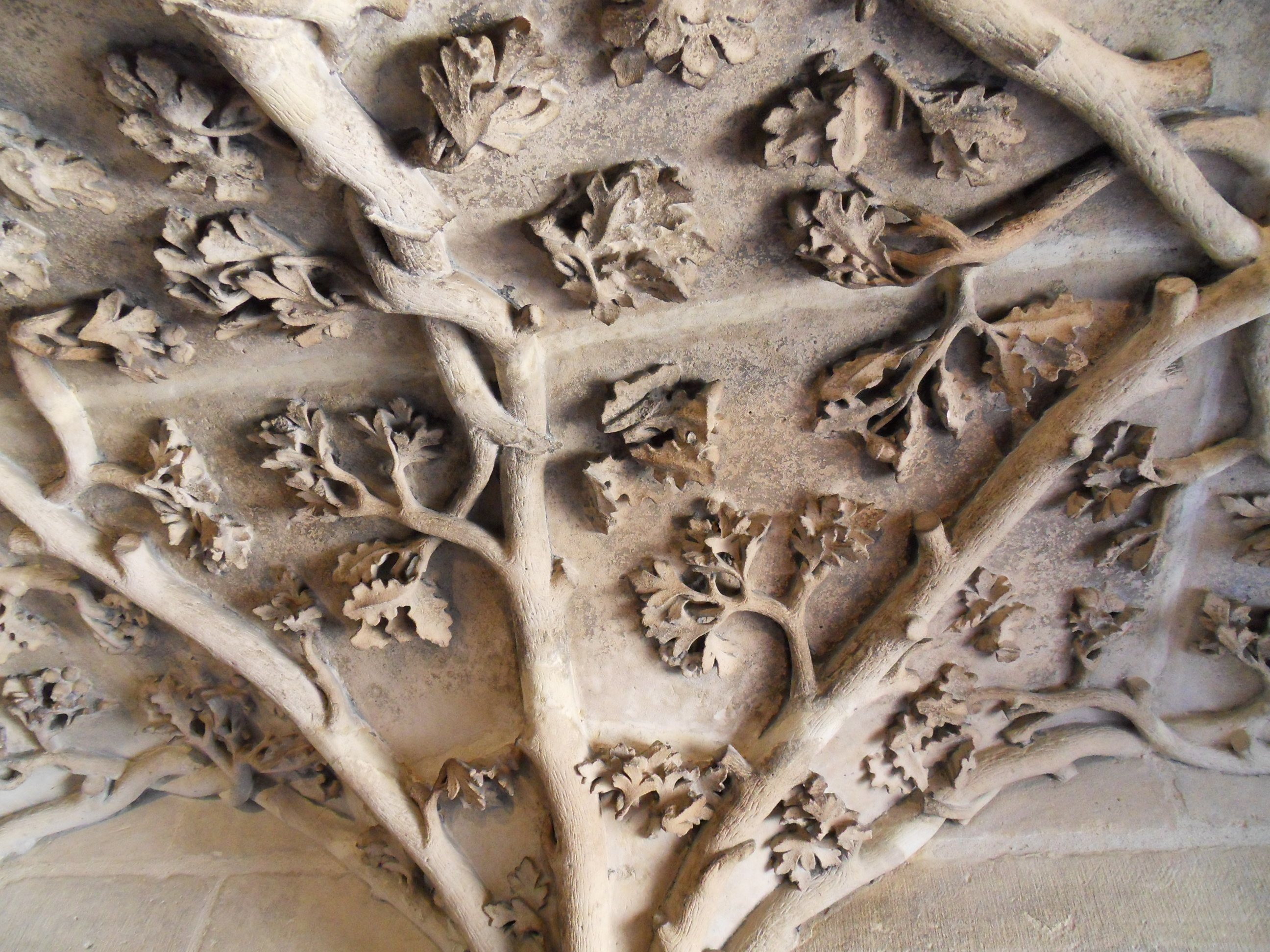
Detail of the stairway vault, showing the oak leaf, hawthorn and hops

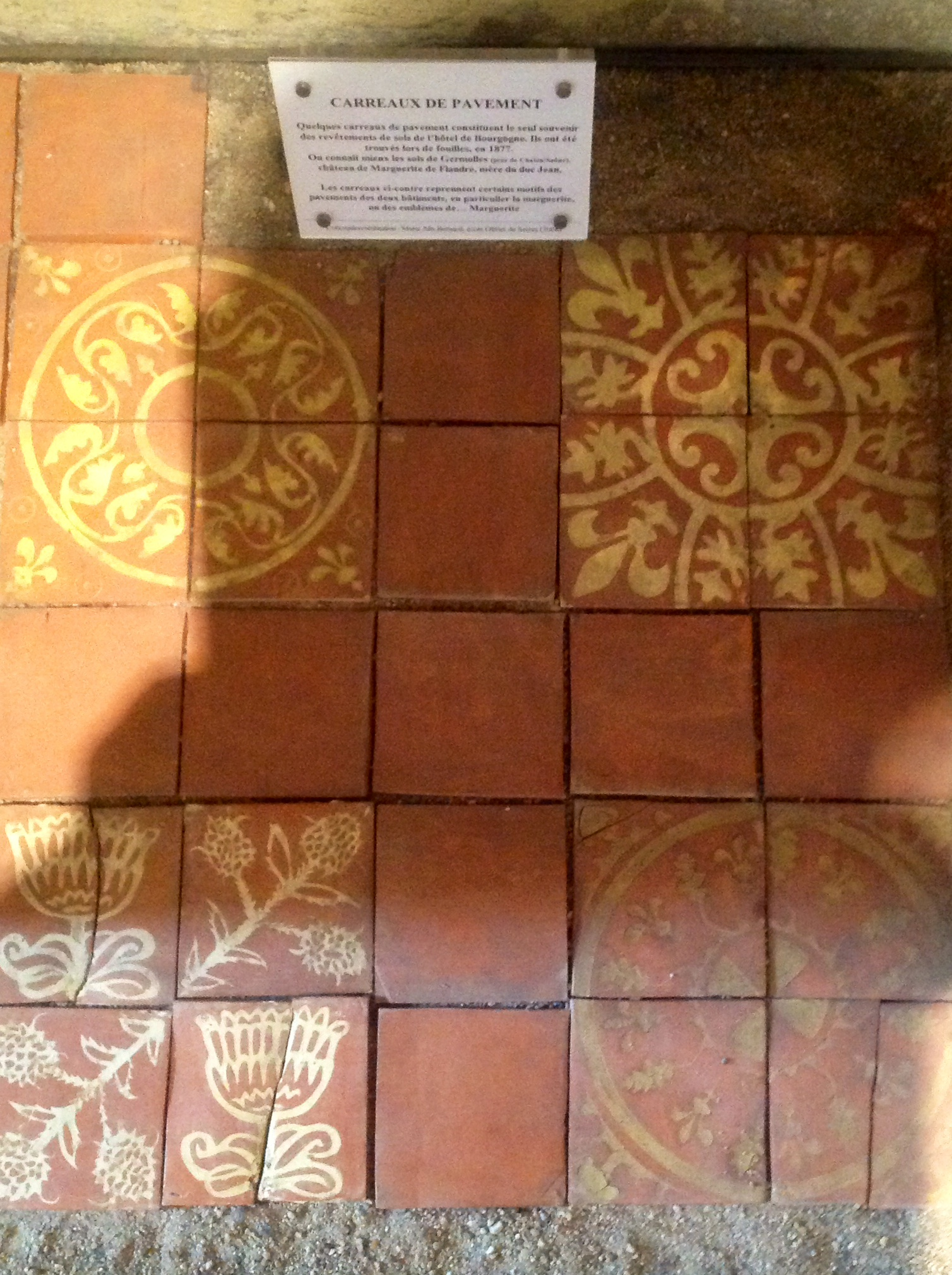
Original floor tiles from the tower with the Marguerite flower

The most famous decoration in the tower is the carved stone vegetation at the top of the winding grand stairway. Originally painted in different colors, it is in the form of the intertwined branches of an oak tree interlaced with leaves of plants symbolic of different members of the family of Jean sans Peur:

- The oak tree, emblem of Philip the Bold, father of Jean sans Peur.
- The hawthorn bush, the emblem of Marguerite de Mâle, mother of Jean sans Peur
- The hops, emblem of Jean sans Peur

The sculpted vault at the top of spiral staircase was the work of Claus de Werve (1380-1439), the nephew and successor Claus Sluter, the court sculptor of the Dukes of Burgundy. De Werve was probably the sculptor of the other decorative works in the tower, the coats of arms of the Duke on the arches of the high chamber the carving of another emblem of the Duke, two tools, a level and a plane. The sculpted vault is considered one of the masterpieces of flamboyant gothic art. Werve's other notable work included the completion of the tomb of Philip the Bold at the ducal palace in Dijon, begun by Sluter, and the Virgin and the Child of Poligny, now in the Metropolitan Museum of Art in New York.

Some of the original floor tiles of the tower are on display, some of which display the marguerite flower, the emblem of Marguerite de Male, the mother of Jean sans Peur. They were found during the excavation of the tower in 1877.

Two small stained glass windows with the emblems of Jean sans Peur and of the Duke of Burgundy can also be found in the upper chambers, but they are not original.

=== Construction ===
The design and construction of the tower was the work of Robert de Helbuterne, the master of public works for Paris beginning in 1406. The stone came from quarries near Paris; hard high-quality limestone, or liaise franc, probably from Notre-Dame-des-Champs near Val-de-Grâce, for the stairs and around the windows and doors, and the lower quality lambourdes or wall-plate, Charenton, Gentilly and Ivry. The quality of the stone cutting and masonry was extremely high in its precision and evenness, unlike that of a simple defensive tower.

The construction took place in three phases: the first was the grand corps or residence, of which only one wall remains. This building had three levels; a ground floor divided into several rooms; then a first floor six meters high, then second floor with a high gabled roof. The building was twenty-three meters high, while the stairway tower was planned to be 18 meters high, stopping at the decorative sculptural vault. It originally opened onto a narrow promenade with a wide view of Paris.

After construction had begun, a decision was made to alter the plan of the stairway tower: it was extended to the south, so that it touched the old city wall, and it was made higher, with two habitable rooms and an attic where a watchman could be stationed. The additional rooms were served by a narrow winding stairway, easier to defend. The decision may have been made because of the growing conflict in Paris between the Burgundians and the Armagnacs. To provide support for the new upper floors, a narrow chamber nine meters high was created on the second floor, which had no evident purpose other than making the tower higher. The quality of stone in the newer parts of the tower was less than that in the original work. Gradually, the stairway tower rose to become higher than the building it originally served.

Before the hôtel was completed, the plan underwent a third modification: the windows of the ground floor of the residence building were walled up, making it more secure, and additional levels and rooms were added. The residence came to resemble a fortress. The materials used in the third phase were of lower quality than in the original portions. Furthermore, the records of payments to the workers show that little work was done on the buildings during the summers of 1409, and 1410, due to the intensification of the war between the Armagnacs and Burgundians, which had spread to Paris. The building was finally completed in 1411, but its builder, Jean sans Peur, left Paris in 1413, and only returned in 1418; he was assassinated the following year.

== See also ==
- Architecture of Paris
- Paris in the Middle Ages

== Bibliography ==
- Ayers, Andrew (2004). The Architecture of Paris: an architectural guide. Edition Axel Menges, Stuttgart, London. ISBN 9783930698967.
- Centre des monuments nationaux (2002). Le Guide du Patrimoine en France: ouverts au public, monuments historiques: châteaux et abbayes, parcs et jardins, sites industriels et archéologiques, édifices du XXe siècle. Paris: Monum, Editions du patrimoine. ISBN 9782858227600.
- Hartnoll, Phyllis (1983). The Oxford Companion to the Theatre, Oxford University Press. ISBN 9780192115461.
- Hervey, Charles (1947). The Theatres of Paris, revised edition, Paris: Galignani, London: John Mitchell. View at Google Books.
- Plagnieux, Philippe (1988). La tour Jean sans Peur, une épave de la résidence parisienne des ducs de Bourgogne. Revue Histoire de l'art, n°1-2. ISSN 0992-2059.
- Rivière, Rémi; Lavoye, Agnès (2007). La Tour Jean sans Peur, Association des Amis de la tour Jean sans Peur. ISBN 9782951649408.
- Viré, Marc; Lavoye, Agnés (2005). Matériaux et phases de construction : l'étude d'une partie de l'hôtel d'Artois à Paris. In : Pierres du patrimoine européen : économie de la pierre de l'Antiquité à la fin des temps modernes, Éditions du Comité des travaux historiques et scientifiques.
