= Mademoiselle Beauchateau =

French actress

Madeleine de Pouget, stage name Mademoiselle Beauchateau (c. 1611–1683), was a French stage actress.

According to an anecdote, she was the natural child of “a demoiselle of good family and a magistrate.” She was married to the actor Francois Chastelet, stage name Beauchateau.

In 1628 the Grands Comediens (Comédiens du Roi) was established at the Hôtel de Bourgogne. Initially, only the male actors are named, but in 1630 three actresses are mentioned: Nicole Gassot (Mlle Bellerose), Madeleine de Pouget (Mlle Beauchateau) and Jeanne Buffequin (Mlle La Fleur). She was engaged at the Théâtre du Marais in 1634. She was a prominent actress of the theatre. She created the role of the Infante in Pierre Corneille’s Le Cid.

According to Paul Scarron, she wrote the prose version of François Tristan l'Hermite’s Les Coups de l’Amour et de la Fortune, which was finished by Scarron. According to Tallemant, she instructed a noblewoman in how to recite verses.

She was described as a wit by Raymond Poisson: said of her as “she is as witty as the devil”, and while Donneau de Vise said of her wit that if he were to speak of it, he would have to “remain a long time on such a rich and vast matter.”
