= De Villiers (playwright) =

French playwright and actor (c. 1600 – 1681)

- Born: c. 1600
- Died: 1681; Chartres

Claude Deschamps (c. 1600 – 1681), better known as de Villiers, was a French playwright and actor. His 1660 tragicomedy, Le Festin de pierre ou le Fils criminel, was a forerunner of Molière's Dom Juan. He also wrote burlesque comedies L'Apothicaire dévalisé (1660) and Les Ramoneurs (1662). As an actor, de Villiers often played servant roles and participated in the Théâtre du Marais and Hôtel de Bourgogne troupes.
