= Mademoiselle Bellerose =

French actress (1605 – 1679)

Nicole Gassot, known under her stage name Mademoiselle Bellerose (1605 – 1679), was a French stage actress.

She was the daughter of the actor Jean Gassot, stage name La Fortune. She and her father were members of the same theatre company as Mondory in March 1618. She first married the actor Mathias Meslier, and secondly in 1630 the actor Pierre Le Messier, stage name Bellerose.

In 1628 the Grands Comediens (Comédiens du Roi) was established at the Hôtel de Bourgogne. Initially, only the male actors are named, but in 1630 three actresses are mentioned: Nicole Gassot (Mlle Bellerose), Madeleine de Pouget (Mlle Beauchateau) and Jeanne Buffequin (Mlle La Fleur). She was engaged at the Hôtel de Bourgogne between 1630 and 1660.

She was a star attraction of the theatre and described as the perhaps most popular stage actress of the theatre at the time. The contemporary chronicle writer Tallemant described the Parisian actresses of the 1630s, and referred to Mlle Bellerose as “the best actress in Paris.” She was famous in the role of amoureux or heroine, and in tragic roles.

Isaac de Benserade wrote the tragedy Cléopâtre for her in 1635.
