= Charles Le Noir =

French actor-manager (died 1637)

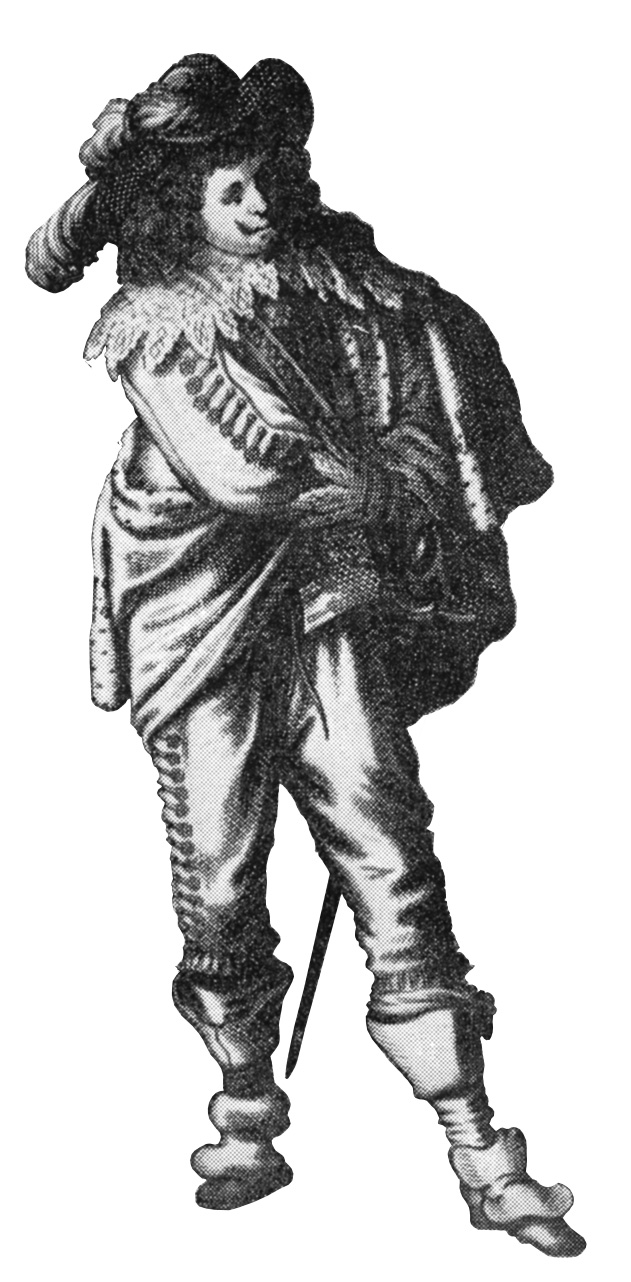
Charles Le Noir, c. 1635, detail from an engraving by Abraham Bosse, depicting the Troupe Royale at the Hôtel de Bourgogne in Paris

Charles Le Noir or Lenoir (French pronunciation: [ʃaʁl lə nwaʁ]; first active 1618; died 9 August 1637) was a French actor-manager, who was a member of the troupe of the Prince of Orange from at least 1622, sometimes named as a co-founder with the actor Montdory of the Théâtre du Marais in 1634, and a member of the Troupe Royale at the Hôtel de Bourgogne from 1634 to 1637.

== Life ==
The first record of Charles Le Noir shows he was the leader of a troupe in Bordeaux in 1618. He then appears as the leader of a troupe in Lille in 1620.

Le Noir and Montdory were both members of the troupe of the Prince of Orange at the Hôtel de Bourgogne in Paris in July and August 1622. The Prince of Orange died in 1625, but the company continued to perform under his name, appearing regularly in alternation with the troupe of Robert Guérin at the Bourgogne. According to W. L. Wiley, Montdory joined a different troupe in April 1624.

Le Noir was in the cast, when the company presented Pierre Corneille's first play, Mélite, in Paris around 1629–1630. The play may have been presented at the Bourgogne before it was given at the jeu de paume de Berthault, located on the cul-de-sac Beaubourg, where Montdory rejoined the company. Le Noir also appeared in their production of Corneille's Clitandre (1630–1631).

From 15 December 1631, the company began performing at the tennis court known as La Sphère, located on the rue Vieille-du-Temple, and on 10 February 1632, Le Noir and his troupe were sentenced at the Châtelet and required to pay a fine of 405 livres for having given 120 performances at the Berthault. After about three months at La Sphère, the company moved to yet another tennis court, La Fontaine, on the rue Michel-le-Comte, where they were to remain for two years. During this period Le Noir appeared in other plays by Corneille, including, La Veuve (1632–1633), La Galerie du Palais (1632–1633), La Suivante (1633–1634), La Place royale (1633–1634), and possibly Médée (1634–1635).

On 8 March 1634 the troupe leased a jeu de paume on the rue Vieille-du-Temple with a sign on it reading "Les Marestz", which was soon to be their permanent home and eventually become known as the Théâtre du Marais. According to Deierkauf-Holsboer, the theatre's opening and founding occurred on 1 April 1634. Soon, however, Le Noir would have to leave the troupe: according to the Gazette de France of 30 November 1634, King Louis XIII transferred Le Noir along with 5 other actors: L'Espy, Jodelet, Jaqueman Jadot, Alizon, and Mlle Le Noir (Isabelle Mestivier), to the company of Bellerose at the Bourgogne. Very little is known about Le Noir's career during his time there.

Charles Le Noir married the actress Isabelle Mestivier, and they had five children, including the actor François Le Noir. Her father, François Mestivier, was a member of the troupe of the Prince of Orange from at least 1622 until the end of 1634. Charles Le Noir died on 9 August 1637 at his home on the rue Beaurepaire, parish of Saint-Sauveur, Paris.

== Bibliography ==
- Deierkauf-Holsboer, S. Wilma (1954). Le Théâtre du Marais: I. La période de gloire et de fortune, 1634 (1629)–1648. Paris: Librairie Nizet. OCLC 246034781, 459121343.
- Deierkauf-Holsboer, S. Wilma (1968). Le théâtre de l'Hôtel de Bourgogne. I. 1548–1635. Paris: A.-G. Nizet. OCLC 460082258.
- Deierkauf-Holsboer, S. Wilma (1970). Le théâtre de l'Hôtel de Bourgogne. II. Le théâtre de la troupe royale, 1635–1680. Paris: A.-G. Nizet. OCLC 542919.
- Forman, Edward (2010). Historical Dictionary of French Theater. Lanham: The Scarecrow Press. ISBN 9780810849396.
- Gaines, James F. (2002). The Molière Encyclopedia. Westport, Connecticut: Greenwood Press. ISBN 9780313312557.
- Hartnoll, Phyllis, editor (1983). The Oxford Companion to the Theatre, fourth edition. Oxford: Oxford University Press. ISBN 9780192115461.
- Howarth, William D., editor (1997). French Theatre in the Neo-Classical Era 1550–1789. Cambridge: Cambridge University Press. ISBN 9780521100878 (digital reprint, 2008).
- Howe, Alan (2006). "Corneille et ses premiers comédiens", Revue d'Histoire littéraire de la France, vol. 106, no. 3 (July–September 2006), pp. 519–542. JSTOR 23013593.
- Lefebvre, Léon (1907). Histoire du Théâtre de Lille de ses origines à nos jours. Lille: Imprimérie Lefebvre-Ducrocq. Copy at Google Books.
- Mongrédien, Georges (1972). Dictionnaire biographique des comédiens français du XVIIe siècle, second edition. Paris: Centre national de la recherche scientifique. ISBN 9780785948421.
- Soulié, Eudore (1863). Recherches sur Molière et sur sa famille. Paris: Hachette. Copy at Google Books.
- Wiley, W. L. (1960). The Early Public Theatre in France. Cambridge, Massachusetts: Harvard University Press. OCLC 331219. Greenwood Press reprint (1973): ISBN 9780837164496.
- Wiley, W. L. (1973). "The Hotel de Bourgogne: Another Look at France's First Public Theatre", Studies in Philology, vol. 70, no. 5, pp. 1–114. JSTOR 4173826.
