= Bellerose =

Bellerose may refer to:

- Bellerose, Queens, neighborhood in New York City
- Bellerose, New York, adjacent village in Nassau County
  - Bellerose (LIRR station)
- Bellerose (actor), French actor in the early 17th century
- Bellerose Belgium, clothing company
