= La Veuve (Corneille) =

La Veuve, ou Le traître trahi (The Widow, or The Betrayer Betrayed) is a French verse comedy in five acts by Pierre Corneille, which takes place in Paris. The play was probably first performed early in 1632 by the troupe of Charles Le Noir and Montdory at the Sphère, a rather seedy nightclub in Paris. It was first published in 1634.

== Roles ==
- Philiste, in love with Clarice
- Alcidon, friend of Philiste and in love with Doris
- Célidan, friend of Alcidon and beloved of Doris
- Clarice, widow of Alcandre and mistress of Philiste
- Chrysante, mother of Doris
- Doris, sister of Philiste
- Clarice's nurse
- Géron, official of Florange, enamored with Doris
- Lycaste, servant of Philiste
- Polymax, Doraste, Listor, servants of Clarice
