= Encarna =

Encarna is a given name. Notable people with the given name include:

- Encarna Abad (born 1927), Spanish actress
- Encarna Granados (born 1972), Spanish race walker
- Encarna Paso (1931–2019), Spanish film and television actress
- Encarna Sánchez (1935–1996), Spanish talk radio host and current events commentator
