= Rodolphe Blavy =

Economist

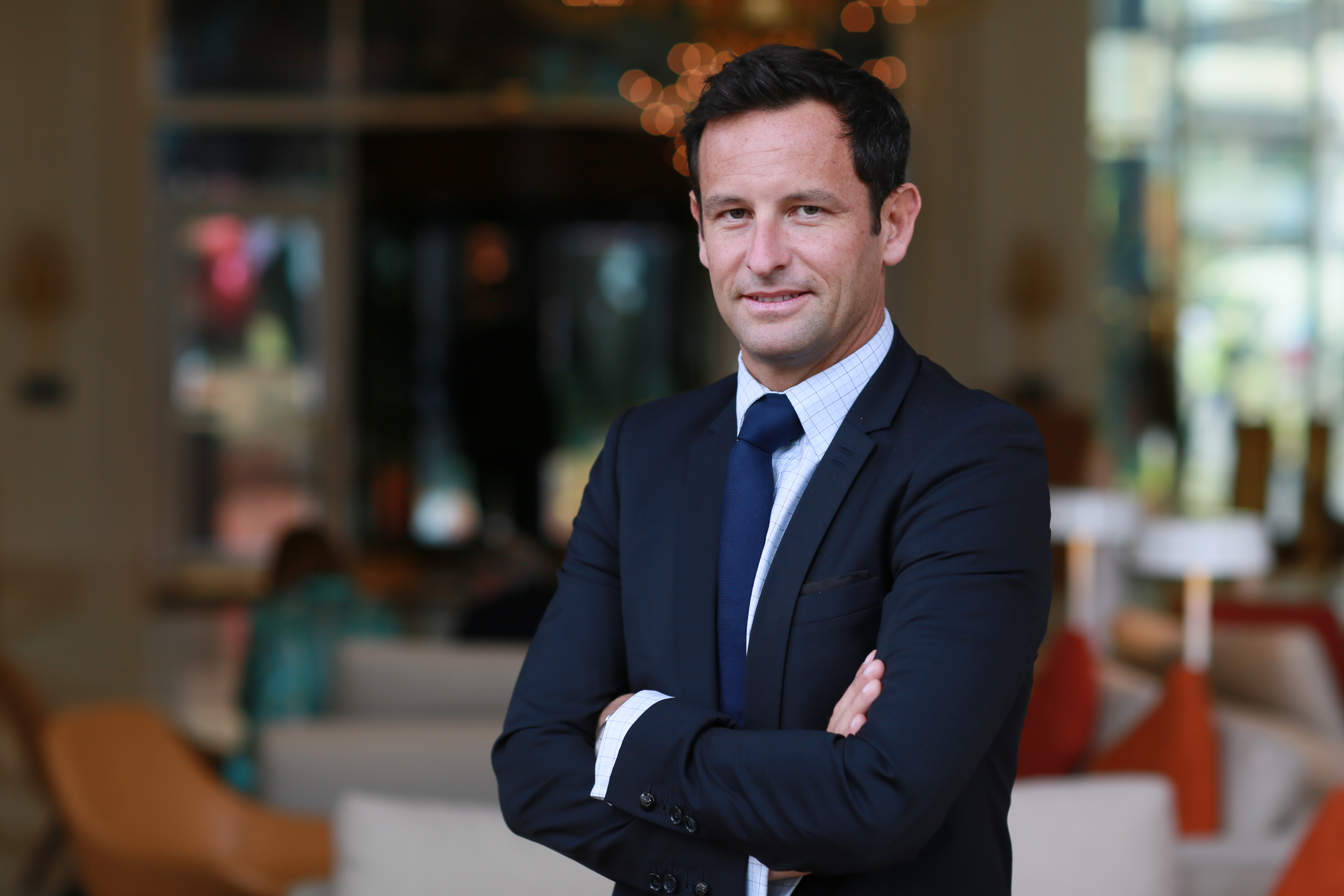
Rodolphe Blavy

Rodolphe Blavy is a senior manager at the International Monetary Fund. He is currently deputy director of the IMF Europe Offices, a position he has held since 2009. His mandate covers multilateral and regional surveillance in Europe, sovereign advisory at the regional level, and policy analysis and advisory, including to G20 and G7 forums.

Aside from his official duties, Rodolphe Blavy is a published writer and activist art collector, with a deep involvement with Africa.

== Biography ==
Rodolphe Blavy grew up in Africa. Born in Beirut (Lebanon), he moved to Africa shortly after and lived in Dakar and Abidjan until the age of 17 when he first moved to France. Alumni of the Lycée Blaise Pascale in Abidjan and the Lycée Fermat in Toulouse, Rodolphe Blavy is a graduate from Sciences Po in Paris (MA), from ESSEC Business School (MBA), and from Cambridge University, where he obtained his MPhil and pursued his doctoral studies.

His career has focused on macroeconomics, finance and policy advisory.

== Career ==
Rodolphe Blavy started his career in banking, working first for J.P. Morgan as an M&A analyst while completing his M.B.A. and then as an associate and derivatives trader at Lehman Brothers.

Since joining the IMF in 2001, Rodolphe Blavy covered key policy issues for Low income countries (with a focus on Africa) and emerging markets (including Mexico and Venezuela), in particular related to macro-financial linkages and has been involved in the negotiation and monitoring of Fund-supported programs (Nigeria, Rwanda, Comoros, Guinea, and Gabon).

In the context of the crisis, he joined the IMF Strategy Unit, a group instrumental in IMF reforms, including new lending facilities, financing, cross-country macro and financial surveillance, governance, and the reform of the International Monetary System. He was appointed to the role of Deputy Director of the IMF Offices in Europe in 2009, dealing with crisis-related and G20 issues. Rodolphe Blavy represents the IMF officially in international meetings, including at the OECD, G20 meetings, and other institutions in Europe. He has extensively been involved as a public speaker in the policy debate, notably in Europe.

He has published extensively, on topics covering financial sector issues and more generally policy issues.

Rodolphe Blavy worked as Visiting Professor at Sciences Po Paris, teaching "Economic Policy" and at Université Paris Dauphine, teaching "International Macroeconomics" and setting up a university thinktank, "Warning Signals," focused on bringing a prospective analysis of key global macroeconomic issues.

== Art and literature ==
Aside from his official duties, Rodolphe Blavy has shown a strong commitment to the arts, a published writer and photographer.

His novels explore the complexity of family relationships, gender, and the challenges of today's societies. He published his first novel in 2015, Le Pardon (Ed. Arléa) – a novel narrating the confrontation of a young man with Africa, in a struggle to set himself free from the bounds of the past.

Enfants, his second novel, published in 2019, has been critically acclaimed, for its objective investigation of the journey of a man to become a single father – confronting a difficult and poorly informed environment in France. The novel was translated into a 7-episode podcast with Majelan.

Rodolphe Blavy contributed to Traversee 2030, a collection of short stories about the climate and social challenges for the world going forward. In 2010, he also co-directed and choreographed "Vous Dansez ", a play presented at the Théâtre du Marais as an exploration of the challenging world of dancers, based on a text by Marie Nimier.

In 2021, Rodolphe Blavy’s photography series, Hotel Rooms, was published, notably in the Oeil de la Photographie – confronting the daily life of businessmen to the lockdown reality of the COVID period: an e-life of confined intimacy defined by others.

== Contemporary African Art and Activism ==
Rodolphe Blavy has defined himself as an activist art collector, with a special dedication to contemporary African art.

Since 2018, Rodolphe Blavy is a member of the Acquisition Committee for Contemporary Art at the Centre Pompidou and a benefactor for the Museum. In 2019, he was a founding member of the African Committee, focused on modern and contemporary African art. The Margaux and Raphael Blavy Collection, dedicated to his children, has been displayed internationally in museum shows. Rodolphe Blavy is a Mécène for the ADIAF (Association for the International Diffusion of French Art), and a member of the Nasher Sculpture Center Drawings Forum. He has been a member of the juries for several art prices, including the 2022 Prix DDessin and the 2020 Rencontres Artistiques Carré sur Seine.

== Publications ==
- 2018 : Economic Convergence in the Euro Area : Coming Together or Drifting Apart, Rodolphe Blavy with co-authors Jeffrey Franks, Bergljot Barkbu, William Oman, Hanni Schoelermann
- 2014 : Youth Unemployment in Advanced Economies in Europe : Searching for Solutions, Rodolphe Blavy with co-authors Angana Banerjii, Sergeja Saksonovs, Huidan Lin
- 2011 : Market Phoenixes and Banking Ducks: Are Recoveries Faster in Market-Based Financial Systems?, Rodolphe Blavy with co-author Julien Allard
- 2009 : Estimating Default Frequencies and Macrofinancial Linkages in the Mexican Banking Sector, Rodolphe Blavy with co-author Marcos Souto
- 2008 : Mexico's Integration into NAFTA Markets: A View from Sectoral Real Exchange Rates and Transaction Costs, Rodolphe Blavy with co-author Luciana Juvenal
- 2006 : Assessing Banking Sector Soundness in a Long-Term framework : The Case of Venezuela
- 2006 : Public Debt and Productivity: the Difficult Quest for Growth in Jamaica
- 2005 : Monitoring and Commitment in Bank Lending Behavior
- 2004 : Inflation and Monetary Pass-Through in Guinea
- 2004 : Microfinance in Africa: Experience and Lessons from Selected African Countries, Rodolphe Blavy with co-authors Anupam Basu and Murat Yulek
- 2001 : Trade in the Mashreq : An Empirical Examination
