= Encarna Abad =

Spanish actress (1927–2014)

- Born: 1927; Spain
- Died: 10 October 2014 (aged 86–87); Madrid, Spain
- Occupation: Actress
- Years active: 1930–1990

Encarna Abad (1927 – 10 October 2014) was a Spanish actress whose career spanned from the late 1930s until her retirement in the 1990s.

== Biography ==
Abad's stage career began in the 1930s as a student of Pérez de León y Tablilla Acting School, and her professional debut was in musical theatre after the Spanish Civil War. She joined Mariano Madrid's company and appeared in comedic roles in Pablo Luna's Molinos de viento (1943) and Francisco Alonso's Luna de miel en El Cairo (1944). She performed in La blanca doble alongside comedy trio Zori, Santos y Codeso (1947); El oso y el madroño (1949);and Su majestad la mujer (1951), all three under composer Jacinto Guerrero.

In the late 1950s, she appeared in vedette roles in Día y noche de Madrid (1952), Torre de arena (1956), and El visón de Lulú (1959). She performed in sainete productions including Cuidado con la Paca (1951) and El niño de las coles (1951), both by José de Lucio. She changed her stage name from Encarnita ("little Encarna") to Encarna in the early 1960s and ended her musical theatre career to focus solely on comedy. She appeared in Lope de Vega's La malcasada (1962), Alfonso Paso's Un 30 de febrero (1963), La gobernadora with Francisco Piquer (1964) and Un sereno debajo de la cama with Carmen Maura (1970). In 1972, she traveled with the Tirso de Molina company to the German Federal Republic to perform Miguel Mihura's Ninette y un señor de Murcia for Spanish immigrants.

She completed many projects under director Gustavo Pérez Puig, including Jean Anouilh's Los peces rojos (1973), Muñoz's La venganza de Don Mendo (1977), Jardiel's Angelina o el honor de un brigadier (1979), Létraz's Una noche en su casa... señora (1979), Mihura's El caso de la mujer asesinadita (1982), Jardiel's Un marido de ida y vuelta (1985), Castro's Las mocedades del Cid (1990), Salinas' Judit y el tirano (1992), Benavente's Los intereses creados (1992), Millán's El cianuro... ¿solo o con leche? (1993), Zorrilla's Don Juan Tenorio (1993), and Casona's El caballero de las espuelas de oro (1994). In 1995, she appeared in Picospardo's under the direction of Mara Recatero at the Teatro Español. In addition to stage work, she also began working in television in the mid-1960s, particularly in televised theatre programmes like Estudio 1. She also appeared in the films La cumparsita in 1961 and Abuelita Charlestón in 1962. Throughout her career, she was part of several acting companies, including those under Gaspar Campos, Adela González, and Juan Espantaleón, as well as the house company at Teatro Español.

Abad retired in the late 1990s. Abad died on 10 October 2014, at the age of 86–87.

== Selected stage work ==
Year	Title	Role	Playwright	Director	Notes	Ref
1943	Molinos de viento		Pablo Luna			
1944	Luna de miel en El Cairo		Francisco Alonso			
1946	Cinco minutos nada menos		José Muñoz Román			
1947	La blanca doble		Enrique Paradas and Joaquín Jiménez		With composer Jacinto Guerrero	
1949	El oso y el madroño		José López de Lerena and Pedro Llabrés	Eladio Cuevas	With composer Jacinto Guerrero	
1951	Su majestad la mujer		José López de Lerena and Pedro Llabrés		With composer Jacinto Guerrero	
1951	Cuidado con la Paca		José de Lucio			
1951	El niño de las coles		José de Lucio			
1952	Día y noche de Madrid		Pedro Llabrés	Luis Bellido		
1956	Torre de arena		Pedro Llabrés			
1959	El visón de Lulú		M. Pozón y San Julián			
1962	La malcasada		Lope de Vega	Gustavo Pérez Puig		
1963	Un 30 de febrero		Alfonso Paso			
1964	La gobernadora		Jacinto Benavente	Víctor Andrés Catena		
1965	Invitación al castillo		Jean Anouilh		Televised on Primera fila	
1965	El verdugo de Sevilla		Pedro Muñoz Seca		Televised on Teatro de humor	
1966	Cerca de las estrellas		Ricardo López Aranda		Televised on Estudio 1	
1966	Las manos son inocentes		José López Rubio		Televised on Estudio 1	
1966	Los amantes de Teruel		Juan Eugenio Hartzenbusch		Televised on Estudio 1	
1966	Confesión testamentaria		Alejandro Núñez Alonso		Televised on Los encuentros	
1970	Un sereno debajo de la cama		Cecilio Valcárcel			
1972	Ninette y un señor de Murcia	Bernarda	Miguel Mihura	Manuel Manzaneque	Performed in the German Federal Republic	
1973	Los peces rojos	Antonio's grandmother	Jean Anouilh	Gustavo Pérez Puig		
1974	El proceso de Mary Dugan		Bayard Veiller		Televised on El teatro	
1974	El licenciado Vidriera	Innkeeper	Miguel de Cervantes	Jesús Fernández Santos	Televised on Los libros	
1977	Abel Sánchez		Miguel de Unamuno		Televised on Novela	
1979	El burlador de Sevilla y convidado de piedra		Tirso de Molina		Televised on Teatro estudio	
1979	Angelina o el honor de un brigadier	Doña Calixta	Enrique Jardiel Poncela	Gustavo Pérez Puig		
1982	El caso de la mujer asesinadita	Rosaura	Miguel Mihura	Gustavo Pérez Puig		
1983	Tú y yo somos tres		Enrique Jardiel Poncela		Televised on La comedia	
1985	Un marido de ida y vuelta	Etelvina	Enrique Jardiel Poncela	Marta Recatero		
1986	Un marido de ida y vuelta		Enrique Jardiel Poncela		Televised on Tarde de teatro	
1986	La venganza de Don Mendo	Doña Berenguela	Pedro Muñoz Seca	Gustavo Pérez Puig		
1987	Cuatro corazones con freno y marcha atrás	Doña Luisa	Enrique Jardiel Poncela	Gustavo Pérez Puig		
1988	La venganza de Don Mendo		Pedro Muñoz Seca		Televised on Estudio 1	
1989	Melocotón en almíbar		Miguel Mihura		Televised on Primera función	
1989	El cianuro... ¿solo o con leche?		Juan José Alonso Millán		Televised on Primera función	
1990	Las mocedades del Cid	Elvira	Guillén de Castro y Bellvis	Gustavo Pérez Puig		
1991	¡Sublime decisión!		Miguel Mihura	Antonio Guirau		
1992	Judit y el tirano	Criada	Pedro Salinas	Gustavo Pérez Puig		
1992	Los intereses creados	Señora Polichinela	Jacinto Benavente	Gustavo Pérez Puig		
1993	El cianuro... ¿solo o con leche?		Juan José Alonso Millán	Gustavo Pérez Puig		
1993	Don Juan Tenorio	La Abadesa de las Calavtravas	Francisco de Rojas Zorrilla	Gustavo Pérez Puig		
1994	El caballero de las espuelas de oro	Lorenza	Alejandro Casona	Gustavo Pérez Puig		
1995	Picospardo's	Antonia	Javier García-Mauriño	Mara Recatero		
1996	Honrarás a tu padre		Gay Talese		Televised on Éste es mi barrio	
1996	Bisnes son bisnes		Vicente Escrivá		Televised on Éste es mi barrio	
1996	Pantaleón y las visitadoras	Leonor	Mario Vargas Llosa	Gustavo Pérez Puig		
2004					Televised on ¿Se puede?, episode 6	
