= Cornelian dilemma =

Decision between a range of detrimental outcomes

A Cornelian dilemma (French: dilemme cornélien), also spelt Corneillian dilemma, is a dilemma in which someone is obliged to choose one out of a range of options, all of which reveal a detrimental effect on themselves or someone near them. In classical drama, it will typically involve the character experiencing an inner conflict, forcing them to choose between love and honour or inclination and duty. The dilemma is named after French dramatist Pierre Corneille, in whose play Le Cid (1636) Rodrigue, the protagonist based on Rodrigo Díaz de Vivar, is torn between two desires: that of the love of Chimène, or avenging his family, who have been wronged by Chimène's father. Rodrigue either seeks revenge to avenge his father or loses his honour.

== Examples ==
- In the 1992 Star Trek: The Next Generation episode "The Perfect Mate", the empathic metamorph Kamala learns the meaning of duty from Jean-Luc Picard and fulfills it.
- In the 1999 Star Trek: Voyager episode "Latent Image", the Doctor experiences crippling guilt after having ethical dilemma of making an arbitrary choice between leaving two survivors. The situation is not used for the triage program.
- In the 2008 video game Grand Theft Auto IV, protagonist Niko Bellic must choose between taking revenge upon his treacherous former associate Dimitri Rascalov, resulting in Dimitri's business partner Jimmy Pegorino killing Niko's girlfriend Kate McReary, or striking a deal with Dimitri, alienating Kate and resulting in Dimitri double-crossing him and killing his cousin Roman Bellic.

== See also ==
- No-win situation
- Hobson's choice
- Lesser of two evils principle
