= No-win situation =

Situation where all parties are worse off

A no-win situation is a situation that, from a standpoint of a party or multiple parties, cannot result in success. This may be an unwinnable state for one actor or a lose–lose situation — an outcome of a negotiation, conflict or challenging circumstance in which all parties are worse off. (If one actor has only losing choices, those options may also be described as lose-lose.) It is an alternative to a win–win or outcome in which one party wins. Arbitration or mediation may be used to avoid no-win outcomes and find more satisfactory results.

== In game theory ==
In game theory, a "no-win" situation is a circumstance in which no player benefits from any outcome, hence ultimately losing the match. This may be because of any or all of the following:

- Unavoidable or unforeseeable circumstances causing the situation to change after decisions have been made. This is common in text adventures.
- Zugzwang, as in chess, when any move a player chooses makes them worse off than before such as losing a piece or being checkmated.
- A situation in which the player has to accomplish two mutually dependent tasks each of which must be completed before the other or that are mutually exclusive (a Catch-22).
- Ignorance of other players' actions, meaning the best decision for all differs from that for any one player (as in the prisoner's dilemma).

== Softlocks ==
A variation of a no-win situation found in video gaming is a softlock, a scenario where the game remains playable (as opposed to a 'hard lock', which typically involves the game crashing or otherwise becoming unplayable), but where further progress is rendered impossible. Softlocks may occur due to an unnoticed design flaw or oversight during game development, or they may occur deliberately as a consequence of glitches, sequence breaking, or other intentional actions carried out by players to render the game impossible to win.

== In history ==
Carl von Clausewitz's advice never to launch a war that one has not already won characterizes war as a no-win situation. A similar example is the Pyrrhic victory in which a military victory is so costly that the winning side actually ends up worse off than before it started. Looking at the victory as a part of a larger situation, the situation could either be no-win, or more of a win for the other side than the one that won the "victory", or victory at such cost that the gains are outweighed by the cost and are no longer a source of joy.

For example, the "victorious" side may have accomplished their objective, which may have been worthless; it may also lose a strategic advantage in manpower or positioning. For example, the British Empire was one of the victorious powers of the Second World War but was so weakened by the war that it could no longer maintain its status as a great power in a world that became dominated by the United States and the Soviet Union.

A related concept is sometimes described as "winning the battle but losing the war", where a lesser objective is won, but the greater objective beyond it is not well-pursued and is lost.

During witch trials in Europe, women accused of being witches were sometimes bound and then thrown into water to test their innocence. A "witch" that remained buoyant was accused of calling upon the devil to save her from drowning, and then executed. A "non-witch" would drown, proving her innocence but causing her death.

== Alternative meaning of the term ==
A different form of a no-win situation is where a person or government will look bad no matter what they or it does. Sometimes such is described as a situation destined for failure, expressed by the phrase "damned if you do, damned if you don't."

A no-win situation is a dilemma where no matter what one does, the outcome will be negative.

== See also ==
- Zero-sum game
- Cornelian dilemma
- Double bind
- Dutch book
- Kobayashi Maru
- Morton's fork
- Preparedness paradox
- Setting up to fail
- The Scorpion and the Frog
- Two-body problem (career)
- Vladimir's choice
- Winner's curse
- Catch-22 (logic)
