= Las mocedades del Cid =

Play by Guillén de Castro

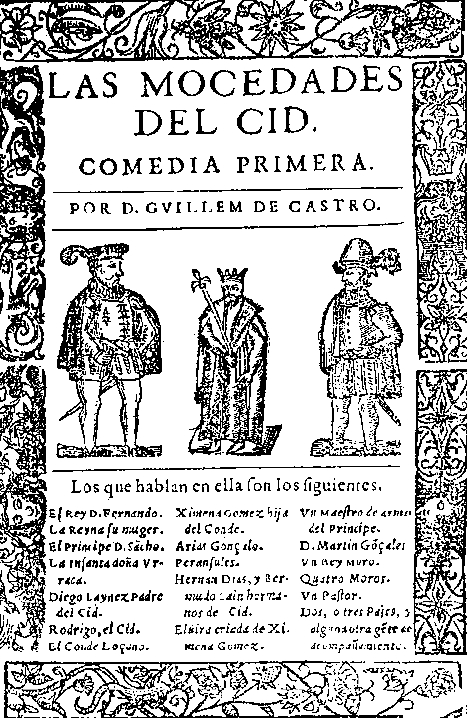
- Title page of a 17th-century printing
- Original language: Spanish
- Written by: Guillén de Castro
- Characters: Rodrigo Díaz de Vivar; Jimena; Diego Laínez; Count Lozano; King Fernando I Infanta Urraca; Prince Sancho
- First publication: 1618
- Subject: The youth of El Cid
- Genre: Historical drama (comedia)
- Setting: Castile, 11th century

Las mocedades del Cid (published in English as The Youthful Deeds of the Cid) is a three-act play by the Spanish Golden Age dramatist Guillén de Castro. Probably written between 1605 and 1615 and first printed in Valencia in 1618, it dramatises the youth of Rodrigo Díaz de Vivar, the Cid, from his knighting at the court of King Fernando I to his marriage with Jimena, whose father he kills to avenge an insult to his own father.

The play reworks the cycle of Spanish ballads about the Cid's youth, a body of legend that had grown out of medieval epic poetry and chronicles, and keeps many of the ballads' lines so that audiences could recognise them. It is traditionally regarded as Castro's masterpiece. Critics have read it either as a drama of the conflict between love and honour or as the story of how an exemplary hero is formed, and some have stressed its Counter-Reformation piety.

Pierre Corneille based his tragicomedy Le Cid (1637) on the play, and it was largely through Corneille that Castro's name became known outside Spain. Castro continued the story in a sequel usually known as Las hazañas del Cid.

== Synopsis ==
=== Act I ===
At the court of King Fernando I, the young Rodrigo Díaz de Vivar is knighted before the altar of Saint James, and the Infanta Urraca fastens on his spurs. Both Urraca and Jimena, daughter of Count Lozano, admire him. When the king appoints Rodrigo's aged father, Diego Laínez, as tutor to Prince Sancho, the jealous count strikes the old man. Too old to avenge himself, Diego Laínez tests the courage of his sons by squeezing the hands of the younger ones and biting Rodrigo's finger, and chooses Rodrigo as his avenger. In a monologue Rodrigo weighs his love for Jimena against his father's honour, decides for honour and kills the count.

=== Act II ===
Jimena appeals to the king for justice, while Diego Laínez defends his son. Rodrigo goes to Jimena's house and offers her his life, but she will not take it and tells him to flee. On his father's advice he rides out against the Moors, taking leave of Urraca on the way. He defeats four Moorish kings, one of whom comes to court as his vassal and calls him mío Cid ("my lord"), a title the king adopts. When Jimena renews her plea, the king banishes Rodrigo to satisfy her, while embracing him as a hero.

=== Act III ===
Jimena continues to demand justice. When the king tests her with a false report of Rodrigo's death, she faints and so betrays her love. To save her reputation she has it proclaimed that she will marry whoever brings her Rodrigo's head. Rodrigo, on a pilgrimage to Santiago de Compostela, shares his food with a leper whom his soldiers shun. The leper reveals himself as Saint Lazarus and foretells that Rodrigo will be invincible and will win battles even after his death. Fernando and the King of Aragon agree to settle their dispute over Calahorra by single combat, and Rodrigo takes up the challenge of the Aragonese champion, the giant Martín González, who vows to bring Jimena the Cid's head. Fernando divides his kingdom among his children, and Prince Sancho's protest foreshadows the conflicts of the sequel. When Jimena is told that a knight is bringing her Rodrigo's head, the knight proves to be Rodrigo himself, carrying the head of Martín González. He offers himself to Jimena, and the play ends with their marriage.

== Composition and structure ==
The date of composition is uncertain. Courtney Bruerton placed the play between about 1612 and 1615, while Stefano Arata, in his 1996 critical edition, took 1605 as the earliest possible date. In that year Juan de Escobar published in Lisbon his Historia y romancero del Cid, a ballad collection that Castro drew on. The play was first printed in Valencia in 1618, in the first volume of Castro's collected plays.

The play is divided into three acts and runs to 3,004 lines.

== Literary sources ==
=== Epic and chronicles ===
Legends about the Cid's youth took shape late in the Middle Ages. Alberto Montaner Frutos finds no reliably documented epic poem on the subject before the end of the 13th century. A lost poem, the Gesta de las mocedades de Rodrigo, was recast in prose in chronicles of the early 14th century, and another version survives as the epic Mocedades de Rodrigo. Castro's generation knew the legend mainly through chronicles printed in the 16th century and through the ballads. Arata lists among the play's antecedents the Crónica particular del Cid (Burgos, 1512), the Crónica popular del Cid, which went through nineteen editions between 1494 and 1618, and the Crónica de España published by Florián de Ocampo in 1541, which brought epic themes back into fashion. The rivalry at court that leads to the count's insult, which no ballad records, recalls Diego Jiménez de Ayllón's epic poem Los famosos hechos del Cid.

=== Ballads ===
The play's main source is the cycle of ballads (romances) on the Cid's youth, which circulated in printed collections, in broadsheets and by word of mouth. In his edition Arata counted twelve ballads incorporated into the play, embedded with minimal changes, and argued that every major sequence except the division of the kingdom is built on one of them. He recalled that Ramón Menéndez Pidal had described Castro's two Cid plays as the Romancero del Cid puesto en acción ("the Cid ballads put into action"). Arata also noted Castro's wish to keep the opening lines of the ballads so that spectators could identify them at once. Ballads supply, for instance, Diego Laínez's test of his sons and much of the wording of Jimena's appeals to the king, which follow the tradition of her three complaints.

Françoise Cazal has argued for a much shorter list. In her view Castro worked directly on only five ballads, taken from the Romancero general (1600) and, above all, from Escobar's Historia y romancero del Cid, which had rearranged the ballads into a chronologically and ideologically coherent life of the hero.

=== Earlier drama ===
The Cid had appeared in Spanish plays before Castro's, but according to Wolfgang von Wurzbach none of the many plays about him written between the 16th and 18th centuries won the renown of Castro's two-part comedia. Henri Mérimée placed Castro alongside Juan de la Cueva, Lope de Vega and Luis Vélez de Guevara among the dramatists who opened the comedia to the ballad tradition. Like Lope, Castro sought to turn national legend into popular theatre, and in the 19th century Ramón de Mesonero Romanos praised his instinct for choosing the national historical and chivalric subjects best suited to Spanish audiences and modelling them on the old ballads. Gemma Domingo Carvajal sees the two Cid plays as the fullest expression of this tendency.

== Analysis ==
=== Love and honour ===
Criticism of the play has traditionally followed two lines. The first, inherited from French and Romantic critics, places at its centre the love between Rodrigo and Jimena and the demands of honour that stand in its way. Joaquín Casalduero refined this reading, arguing that the conflict between love and honour serves as the basis of the play's theme, "what it costs to be noble" (lo que cuesta ser noble). The second, more usual among later Hispanists, is represented by Francisco Ruiz Ramón, for whom the play's axis is the exaltation of the Cid as an exemplary hero rather than the conflict between love and honour.

The dilemma is set out in Rodrigo's monologue after his father's humiliation. Domingo Carvajal describes his quick decision to avenge his father, although it means losing Jimena's love, as a painful victory over himself.

=== The Cid as a stage hero ===
Castro presents Rodrigo as warrior, dutiful son and devout Christian, and as a model vassal. Cazal traces this picture of a law-abiding hero, submissive to his king, to Escobar's ballad collection, which had toned down the rebellious traits of the Cid of the older ballads, and in her reading Castro went even further than Escobar in this direction. Castro also gave the medieval warrior the language of fashionable gallantry, most clearly in the scene in which Rodrigo talks with Urraca at her window.

The leper episode presents Rodrigo as an exemplary Christian. Casalduero wrote that in it "charity at its height illuminates warrior valour", and Domingo Carvajal sees Lazarus's prophecy as a typically Counter-Reformation recasting of the classical hero's dealings with the gods. Russell P. Sebold went further, arguing that Castro constantly draws parallels between the Cid and the biblical David in order to redeem the boastful Rodrigo of the ballads for a Counter-Reformation audience and to make him a model of the period's morality. The fight with the giant Martín González casts Rodrigo as David against Goliath.

== Legacy and influence ==
Las mocedades del Cid is generally regarded as Castro's masterpiece, and it remains the work for which he is chiefly remembered. Pierre Corneille based his tragicomedy Le Cid (1637) on it. Corneille follows its plot closely and translates entire lines, but he set aside the discursive treatment of his Spanish source to concentrate on the conflict between passionate love and family honour. Corneille's success brought Castro's name international fame.

Castro continued the story in a second play, printed after the first in the 1618 volume. The volume's table of contents lists it as Segunda de las hazañas del Cid, and it is usually known as Las hazañas del Cid. Set after Fernando's death, it dramatises the quarrels among his children, the siege of Urraca's city of Zamora by her brother Sancho II, Sancho's murder by the traitor Vellido Dolfos, and the oath that the Cid exacts from Alfonso VI at Santa Gadea. The Cid has a smaller part than in the first play.

== Editions and performances ==
The play was first printed, with its sequel, in Castro's Primera parte de las comedias (Valencia: Felipe Mey, 1618). The volume was reissued in 1621 with a new title page and preliminary leaves. Ernest Mérimée edited the play at Toulouse in 1890, and Víctor Said Armesto's edition followed in 1913. Later editions include Eduardo Juliá Martínez's edition of Castro's works for the Real Academia Española (1925–1927), Luciano García Lorenzo's edition (1978) and Stefano Arata's critical edition (1996). James Crapotta and Marcia L. Welles published a student edition with an English introduction and notes in 2002. An English translation by Robert R. La Du, Luis Soto-Ruiz and Giles A. Daeger was published in 1969 as The Youthful Deeds of the Cid.

Twentieth-century revivals include two productions at the Teatro Español in Madrid. In November 1968 Miguel Narros directed a version by José García Nieto and José Hierro that combined the play with its sequel, with José Luis Pellicena as the Cid, Julieta Serrano as Jimena and Berta Riaza as Urraca. In March 1997 Gustavo Pérez Puig staged a version by José María Rincón at the same theatre, with Juan Carlos Naya as the Cid and Lola Baldrich as Jimena.

== Sources ==
- Casalduero, Joaquín (1962). "Guillén de Castro: Primera comedia de las mocedades del Cid". Estudios sobre el teatro español (in Spanish). Madrid: Gredos. pp. 45–71.
- Cazal, Françoise (1998). "Romancero y reescritura dramática: Las mocedades del Cid" (PDF). Criticón (in Spanish) (72): 93–123.
- Domingo Carvajal, Gemma (2006). Tipología de los personajes en la dramaturgia de Guillén de Castro y Bellvís (1569–1631) (PhD thesis) (in Spanish). Universitat de Barcelona. hdl:10803/1698.
- Montaner Frutos, Alberto (1988). "La *Gesta de las mocedades de Rodrigo y la Crónica particular del Cid" (PDF). In Beltrán, Vicente (ed.). Actas del I Congreso de la Asociación Hispánica de Literatura Medieval (Santiago de Compostela, 2 al 6 de diciembre de 1985) (in Spanish). Barcelona: PPU. pp. 431–444. ISBN 84-7665-251-8.
- Ruiz Ramón, Francisco (1988). Historia del teatro español (desde sus orígenes hasta 1900) (in Spanish). Madrid: Cátedra. ISBN 84-376-0190-8.
- Wurzbach, Wolfgang von (1907). "Introducción". Las mocedades del Cid, I, II. Bibliotheca Romanica (in Spanish). By Guillem de Castro. Strasbourg: J. H. Ed. Heitz – via Internet Archive.
