= Tite et Bérénice =

1670 play by Pierre Corneille

- Original language: French
- Written by: Pierre Corneille
- Subject: Titus and Berenice of Cilicia
- Genre: Heroic comedy
- Setting: Rome, in the imperial palace

Premiere
- Date: 28 November 1670
- Place: Palais Royal Theater, Paris

Tite et Bérénice is a heroic comedy by Pierre Corneille based on the story of Titus and Berenice of Cilicia. It was first performed by Molière's troupe at the Palais Royal Theater in Paris on 28 November 1670, seven days after the premiere of Jean Racine's Bérénice on the same subject. One of Corneille's late plays, it was long overshadowed by Racine's rival treatment.

== Background and publication ==
Corneille's play was staged in direct competition with Racine's Bérénice. According to Charles Marty-Laveaux's account of the first run, the original cast included La Thorillière as Tite, Mlle Molière as Bérénice, Mlle Beauval as Domitie and the young Baron as Domitian. About a month after the premiere, the play was performed before the royal court at Vincennes.

The first printed edition appeared in Paris in February 1671. Unlike most of Corneille's plays, it did not open with an Au lecteur or an Examen, but with extracts from Xiphilinus's epitome of Cassius Dio. Those extracts foreground Titus's reluctant dismissal of Berenice and Domitian's attachment to Domitia, the two Roman-historical threads that Corneille developed most fully in the drama.

== Plot ==
When the play opens, Bérénice has already been sent away from Rome to calm opposition to a marriage between the emperor Tite and a foreign queen. A new marriage between Tite and Domitie is being prepared, but Domitie fears that Tite still loves Bérénice, while Domitian loves Domitie and resents his brother's plans. Bérénice's return to Rome reopens the conflict between love, succession and Roman public opinion.

Domitian tries to use the crisis to his own advantage, and Bérénice initially believes that Tite is prepared to sacrifice her to political convenience. In the final act the Senate unexpectedly offers to accept Bérénice as empress, but she refuses the crown herself, arguing that Rome's laws and Tite's glory must be preserved. She leaves Rome voluntarily, Domitian is promised Domitie, and Tite swears that Bérénice's renunciation will not become the occasion for another marriage.

== Reception ==
Contemporary reaction was mixed. Jean Robinet praised the play and its performers, but Corneille himself was dissatisfied with the way it had been acted. Marty-Laveaux records that the play received twenty-one performances, while Racine's Bérénice reached thirty; Encyclopaedia Britannica describes Corneille's comparative failure as evidence of the public's growing preference for the younger playwright.

Early criticism often dwelt on obscurity in Corneille's dialogue and on the unavoidable comparison with Racine. At the same time, seventeenth-century polemics cited by Marty-Laveaux also praised the ending as the strongest part of the work. In a 2023 reassessment, François Lasserre argued that the play has too often been treated only as the defeated counterpart to Racine's Bérénice, and that it is better understood as a political drama in the form of a comédie héroïque.

Although the play never matched Racine's stage history, it has continued to receive occasional revivals. The Comédie-Française presented a production directed by Patrick Guinand at the Vieux-Colombier in October 1996.
