= Attila (play) =

Attila is a 1667 play by Pierre Corneille.

== Summary ==
The play takes place in Attila's camp, which Corneille locates in Noricum. Despite his defeat in Catalonia, Attila managed to conclude treaties with emperor Valentinian III and with Merovech; prospective marriages were mentioned and the two concerned princesses visited Atila's camp.

In the beginning of the play, Attila is undecided between Merovech's and Valentinian's sisters, Ildione and Honorie. He asks Ardaric and Valamir for advice. Each of them is in love with one of the princesses, who reciprocate their affections. Attila prefers Ildione but considers it a political matter, first and foremost.

After a variety of events, involving love, politics and death threats, Attila is furious at Honorie, Valamir and Ardaric. He decides to marry Ildione, but dies from hemorrhage before the beginning of their wedding ceremony. His death leaves the other protagonists expecting a brighter future.
