= Agésilas =

- Written by: Pierre Corneille
- Original language: French

Premiere
- Date premiered: 1666

Agésilas is a play written by Pierre Corneille and published in 1666. It was first performed in April 1666 at the Hôtel de Bourgogne.

== Characters ==
- Agésilas, king of Sparta
- Lysander, famous Spartan captain
- Cotys, king of Paphlagonia
- Spitridate, Persian high lord
- Mandane, sister of Spitridate
- Elpinice, daughter of Lysander
- Aglatide, daughter of Lysander
- Xénoclès, lieutenant of Agésilas
- Cléon, Greek orator from Halicarnassus

== Plot ==
The action takes places in Ephesus. Lysander has promised to marry his daughters Elpinice and Aglatide to Cotys and Spitridate respectively but he needs the agreement of Agésilas. Cotys and Spitridate quickly realize that this arrangement doesn't suit them. In effect, Spitridate and Elpinice have fallen in love with each other, and the same is true of Cotys and Mandane. Cotys agrees to give Elpinice to Spitridate if Spitridate will give him Mandane in return. However, Spitridate is wary of this because he's afraid of offending Lysander.

For his part, Agésilas is in love with Mandane as well. He learns Lysander is plotting against him, and in response forbids the Spartan captain's daughters from marrying anyone. Agésilas knows he can't marry Mandane because Sparta wouldn't accept it, but he also can't allow Cotys and Mandane to marry either. He knows a union between the families of Cotys and Spitridate will only make him enemies.

Aglatide knows that Spitridate loves her sister and that Cotys doesn't want her hand in marriage. She prefers to hide her feelings and pretend to not care, but she actually hopes that Agésilas loves her. In effect, some years prior, he offered her his love and promised he would marry her.

Agésilas finally decides to confront Lysander and show him that he knows all of his plans. However, Agésilas does not want to bring shame to the man who allowed him to accede to the throne. So, Agésilas resolves to talk to Lysander in private, with only Agésilas' lieutenant Xénoclès present. Lysander confesses to his crimes and says he is ready to submit to his punishment, but asks for clemency for his daughters and their future husbands who were not aware of the plot.

Agésilas decides to pardon Lysander and consents to the marriage of Elpinice to Spitridate and Cotys to Mandane. To honor his promises made years prior and to avoid any plots by Lysander in the future Agésilas agrees to marry Aglatide.

== Versification ==
Agésilas is, along with Psyché, the only Corneille piece to use cross rhyming (ABAB) for the entire piece, along with free verse (the play mixes verses of 8 and 12 feet).

== Critical reception ==
Agésilas was not well received, and was not performed again after its debut in 1666. Nicolas Boileau said of it in a review: "I saw Agésilas. Alas!"
