= Valleran le Conte =

Valleran le Conte or Valleran-Lecomte (fl. 1590 – c. 1615) was an influential French actor-manager and is one of the earliest for whom documentation exists. He dominated theatrical activity in Paris between 1606 and 1612.

From 1592 to 1593 he was a strolling player in the provinces. In 1592 he was performing in Bordeaux, and in 1593 in Frankfurt, where he requested permission to present Biblical tragedies that he claimed to have already given in Rouen and Strasbourg, along with plays by Étienne Jodelle. Not long afterwards he was leading his own company, paying Alexandre Hardy to write plays, and employing Marie Venier as his leading actress.

In 1599, in association with an actor named Adrien Talmy, he signed a three-month lease for the Hôtel de Bourgogne in Paris and formed a company named the Comédiens du Roi. According to Gédéon Tallemant des Réaux in his Historiettes, when Valleran le Conte first played in Paris, he collected the admission fee at the entrance to the theatre himself. Money problems only permitted him to perform intermittently in Paris, and on several occasions he was forced to tour in the provinces and the Low Countries, sometimes reconstituting his troupe or merging it with another.

The older actor Agnan Sarat, who in 1578 had brought his own company to Paris and leased the Hôtel de Bourgogne, became the chief comedian in Valleran le Conte's company in 1600 and remained with him until Sarat's death in 1613. Valleran le Conte himself was well received as an actor, performing the young lover in Commedia dell'Arte plays and also in farce. He is noted for giving the plays of Hardy and worked with other well-known actors, including Bellerose, Bruscambille, Gaultier-Garguille, Gros-Guillaume, and Montdory. His interactions with Italian troupes in Paris influenced the subsequent Italianate style of French acting in the early 17th century. In 1612 he left Paris, forming yet another company to tour the provinces, but recently discovered documents show he was back in Paris again in 1615.
