= Le Cid =

1636 play by Pierre Corneille

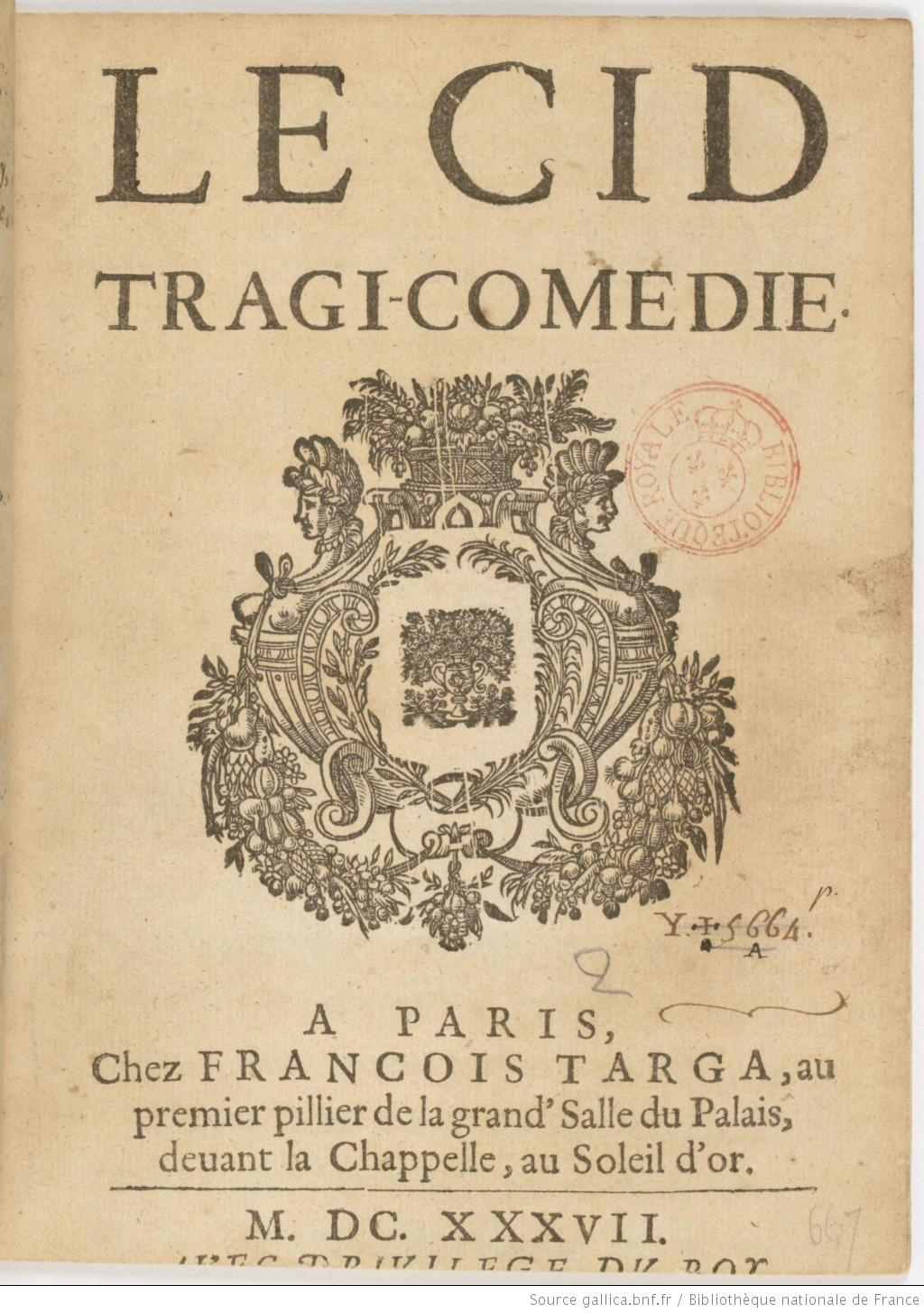
- Title page of 1637 printing of Le Cid
- Original language: French
- Written by: Pierre Corneille
- Characters: See below
- Genre: Tragicomedy
- Setting: Kingdom of Castile

Premiere
- Date: February 7, 1637
- Place: Théâtre du Marais, Paris

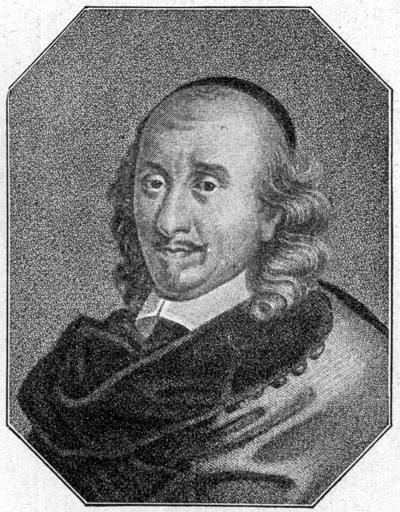
Portrait of Pierre Corneille, the playwright

Le Cid is a five-act French tragicomedy written by Pierre Corneille, first performed in December 1636 at the Théâtre du Marais in Paris and published the same year. It is based on Guillén de Castro's play Las Mocedades del Cid. Castro's play in turn is based on the legend of El Cid.

An enormous popular success, Corneille's Le Cid was the subject of a heated polemic over the norms of dramatic practice known as the Querelle du Cid (Quarrel of The Cid). Cardinal Richelieu's Académie française acknowledged the play's success, but determined that it was defective, in part because it did not respect the classical unities.

Today, Le Cid is widely regarded as Corneille's finest work, and is considered one of the greatest plays of the seventeenth century.

== Background ==
The stories of the Cid are based on the life of the Spanish warrior Rodrigo Díaz de Vivar, who lived approximately from 1043 until 1099. The real "Cid" seems to have fought for both Muslims and Christians at different times and appears to have been a sellsword figure. In the play, however, he is lauded solely as a Christian soldier. The name "El Cid" was derived from the Arabic word for lord ("sayyid") and made Spanish, and further given a French article for Corneille's version. To this day, the Cid remains a popular Spanish folklore character, who has inspired many stories and works of art.

The play is derived from Guillén de Castro's play Las Mocedades del Cid, published in 1618 and written somewhere between 1612 and 1615. Because of the pieces' similarities, Jean Mairet accused Corneille of plagiarism in March 1637.

== Performance history and "La Querelle" ==
Le Cid was originally staged at the Théâtre du Marais in December 1636. The play was a success, although it was quite controversial due to its divergence from the standard playwriting guidelines of the time. The piece was groundbreaking for a few reasons. It had a happy ending, which was rare for "tragedies" of the time, and allowed later tragicomic playwrights to end their plays in a variety of ways. Critics tried to hold the play up to Aristotle's Poetics and its prescriptions, but Corneille argued that great tragic characters are inherently implausible. He took a difficult topic and showed, rather realistically, how it might occur. This disagreement and the discussions following it are known as "La Querelle du Cid," or The Quarrel of The Cid.

After its premiere, Cardinal Richelieu asked the new Académie française to write a discussion of the merits of the play. Georges de Scudéry, another dramatist, wrote a critique of the play as well. He claimed Corneille was "deifying" himself. He intended to prove that the play's plot was worthless, abused the basic rules of dramatic poetry, pursues an erratic course, and all of the play's beauties are stolen.

Jean Chapelain wrote the document for the Académie, which particularly criticizes the implausibility of Chimène's continued affection for Rodrigue after he kills her father. Her agreement to marry Rodrigue as the King commands made her an immoral character, Chapelain argued, which was a danger to the viewing public and their morals. He said implausible and immoral characters should not be featured in plays, even if they are based in history. Corneille ignored this and proved that plays did not need to be educative, always showing evil being punished. Plot points must be necessary, the Académie argued, historical events such as this should not be dramatized. Too many actions occur in a 24-hour period, and Le Cid did not conform to unity of place.

In response to these critiques, Corneille argued that his play evoked both pity and fear. The characters of Rodrigue and Chimène, he noted, have virtue, which is what leads to their passions, thereby causing the misfortune. He argued that multiple actions worked well for a play to have a strong beginning, middle, and end. There is only one complete action in the play, but it can evolve through several other incomplete actions. The play was set in only one city, which Corneille believed should be equivalent to unity of place.

== Characters ==
- Don Rodrigue (Le Cid) – Chimène's lover, son of Don Diègue. After fighting successfully against the Moors, the enemies name him "Le Cid," which is derived from the Arabic word for lord, sayyid.
- Chimène – Daughter of Don Gomès. She has a romance with Don Rodrigue but they become estranged when he kills her father in a duel.
- Don Gomès, The Count of Gormas – father of Chimène, general of Castile
- Don Diègue – Father of Don Rodrigue
- Doña Urraque, L'Infante – daughter of the king, in love with Don Rodrigue
- Don Fernand – King of Castile (historically, from 1035-1065)
- Don Sanche – In love with Chimène, fights Don Rodrigue
- Elvire – Chimène's governess
- Leonor – Doña Urraque's governess.
- Don Arias and Don Alonse – Men of Castile

== Plot summary ==
Setting: The play takes place in the city of Seville in the Castile region of Spain during the second half of the 11th century.

Act I

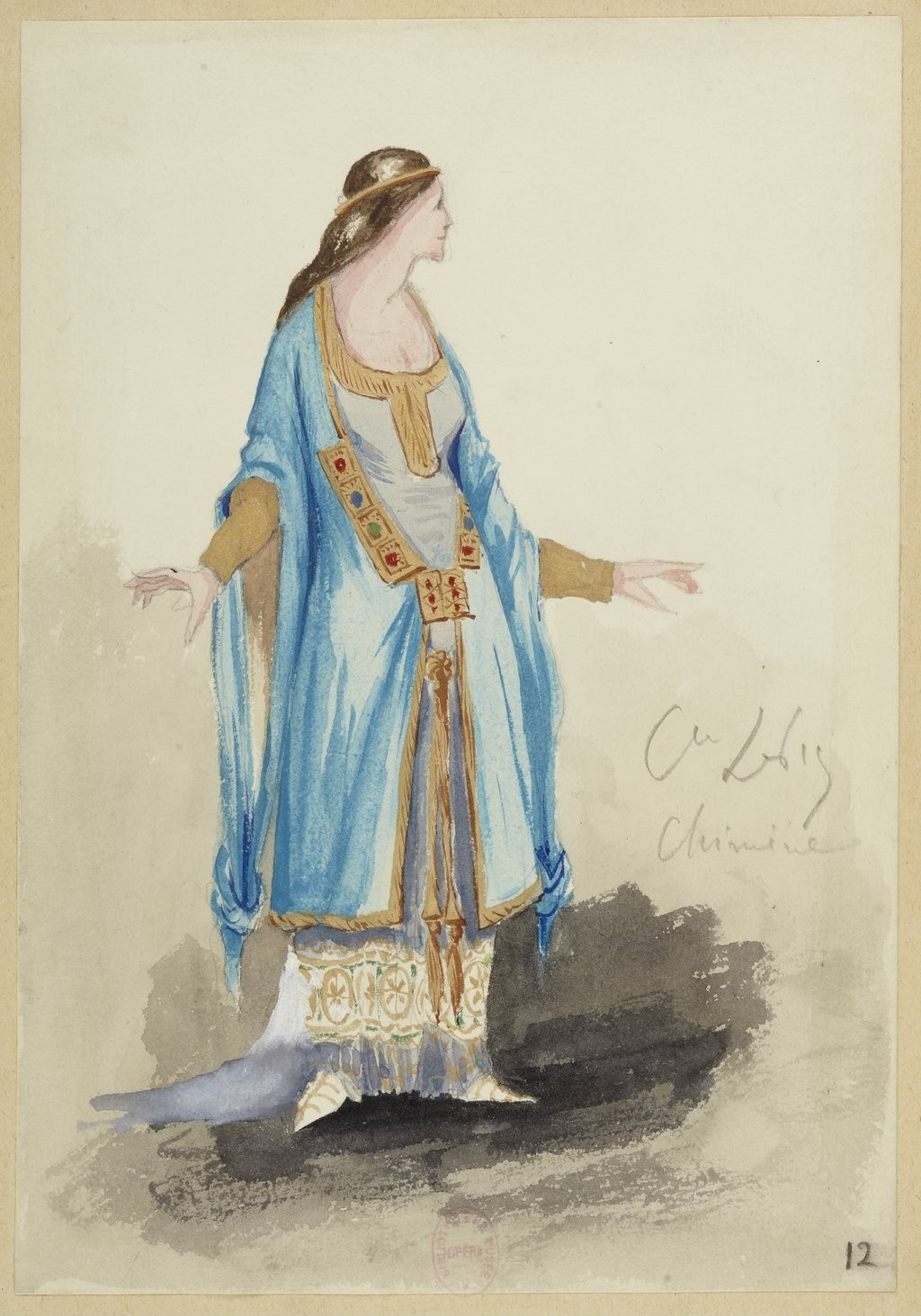
Chimène - Costume for Massenet's Opera based on Le Cid by Ludovic Napoléon Lepic in 1885

The play opens with Chimène hearing from her governess, Elvire, that Chimène's father believes Don Rodrigue, who Chimène also favors, to be the stronger choice for her marriage. Chimène, however, does not allow herself yet to be overjoyed, and fears that fate might change her father's mind.

In the second scene, the Infante (or princess) reveals to her maid that she is in love with Rodrigue, but could never marry him because of his lower social class. Therefore, she has decided to bring Chimène and Rodrigue together in order to extinguish her own passions.

In the third scene, Chimène's father, Don Gomès, Count de Gormas, has learned that the king has asked Rodrigue's old father, Don Diègue, to tutor the Prince of Castile. The count believes he is worthier of the position than Diègue, and tells Diègue this. Diègue says the two should become friends and have their children married. The count refuses and slaps Diègue, who draws his sword but is too weak to hold it. The count disarms him and insults him before leaving.

Diègue is ashamed by this encounter and asks his son to avenge him and fight the count. Rodrigue realizes if he fights and kills the count, he will lose Chimène's love, but still chooses to fight to honor his father's name.

Act II

Don Arias tells the count that the king forbids a duel between him and Rodrigue, but the count arrogantly disobeys and wants to fight regardless. He taunts Rodrigue but also commends him for his lack of fear and spirit and asks him to stand down, but Rodrigue refuses.

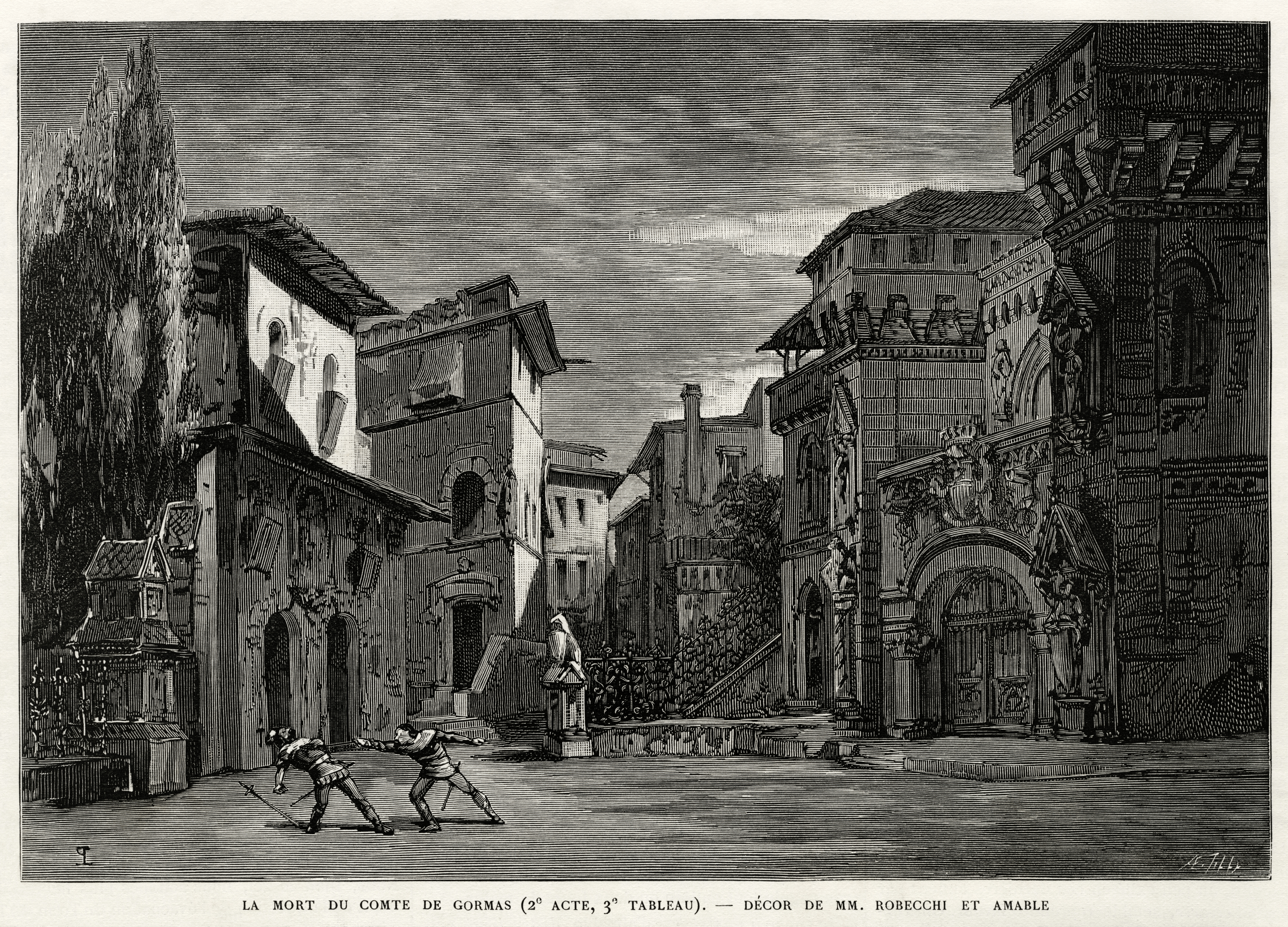
The Duel - Drawn for Massenet's Opera based on Le Cid

Chimène tells the princess how distraught she is about her lover and her father fighting. A page notifies them that he saw the two men leaving the palace. Chimène realizes they have gone to duel, and leaves quickly. The Infante considers if Rodrigue wins the duel, Chimène will reject him, and the Infante will be able to win him after all.

Meanwhile, the king tells Don Sancho and Don Arias of his anger regarding the count's cruelty to Diègue and his agreement to duel Rodrigue. The king also worries about a potential impending attack by the Moorish navy moving toward his lands. Don Alonse enters and announces that Rodrigue has killed the count.

Act III

Rodrigue comes to Chimène's home, and tells Elvire that he will be killed by Chimène's hand. Elvire tells him to flee, and he hides as Chimène approaches. Chimène tells Elvire of her conflicting feelings, but that she must make sure Rodrigue dies. She plans to follow him in death afterward. Rodrigue reveals himself and gives Chimène his sword to kill him, but she cannot.

Rodrigue returns home, and his father tells him the Moors are going to attack. Rodrigue must fight them, and if he returns alive and a winner, the king will praise him and he will regain Chimène's love.

Act IV

Rodrigue goes to war and is very successful. The captured Moors even revere him, and call him “The Cid.” The Infante begs Chimène to give up her quest to kill Rodrigue, but Chimène refuses. The king tricks Chimène into believing Rodrigue has been killed, and her reaction proves to everyone that she still loves him. Regardless, she still feels the need to avenge her father's death. Don Sanche says he will fight Rodrigue on her behalf, and she promises to marry whoever triumphs.

Act V

Rodrigue comes to Chimène and says he will not defend himself in the fight against Don Sanche. She says he must truly fight to save her from a marriage to Don Sanche.

In a monologue, the Infante declares that Rodrigue belongs to Chimène, if so little hatred has come between them since he killed her father.

Chimène sees Don Sanche come in with a bloody sword, and believes he has killed Rodrigue. She cries that she loved Rodrigue, and pleads not to marry the victor, but will instead enter a convent and grieve forever over her father and Rodrigue. She will leave all of her possessions to Don Sanche. However, the king tells her Rodrigue is still alive. Rodrigue disarmed Don Sanche but decided to let him live. Don Sanche says the two should marry because of their obvious love for one another.

The king tells Chimène she has served her father enough by putting Rodrigue in danger and no longer needs to avenge him. He tells her to do something for herself by marrying Rodrigue, but realizes she still needs time to “dry her tears.” They will be married in a year, and in the meantime, Rodrigue will continue to fight against the Moors and remain faithful to Chimène and become even more worthy of her love.

== Structure ==
=== Rhyme scheme ===
The play is written in rhyming couplets with alternating masculine and feminine rhymes, as is typical of French drama. The opening lines are as follows:

Chimène.
Elvire, m'as-tu fait un rapport bien sincère ?
Ne déguises-tu rien de ce qu'a dit mon père ?
Elvire.
Tous mes sens à moi-même en sont encor charmés :
Il estime Rodrigue autant que vous l'aimez,
Et si je ne m'abuse à lire dans son âme,
Il vous commandera de répondre à sa flamme.

Some English translations of the play imitate the rhyme scheme, while others are written in prose.

=== Meter ===
The play's meter is alexandrine (or vers alexandrin), which was popular in classical French poetry. Each line must contain 12 syllables, and major accents are placed on the 6th and 12th syllables. The caesure (caesura, or pause) occurs after the 6th syllable, halfway through the line. It is frequently used as a strong syntactic break in the wording. Each half of the line (6 syllables) is referred to as a hemistich (hémistiche). Enjambment is not used in the French alexandrin, but is sometimes employed in English translation of the verse. The name of the line originated from the Roman d'Alexandre, written in 1170.

== Adaptations ==
Scholars estimate that at least twenty-six composers have created an operatic adaptation of the classic tale. Most notably, the play is the basis for the opera Le Cid by Jules Massenet and partly for Handel's Flavio. Roger Iglésias directed a made-for-television adaptation, which was broadcast on February 24, 1962. A number of literary, theatrical, and film parodies also exist, mostly in French culture.

== See also ==
- Académie française
- Cornelian dilemma
- Mocedades de Rodrigo
- Las Mocedades del Cid
- Le Cid (opera)
