= Bérénice =

Five-act tragedy by the French 17th-century playwright Jean Racine

Berenice
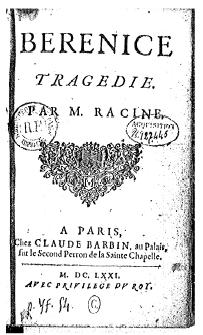
- Title page from the 1671 edition of Bérénice
- Original language: French
- Written by: Jean Racine
- Characters: Bérénice; Titus; Antiochus; Paulin; Arsace; Phrénice; Rutile
- Subject: Rome
- Genre: tragedy
- Setting: The imperial palace at Rome

Premiere
- Date: 1670
- Place: France

Berenice (French: Bérénice) is a five-act tragedy by the French 17th-century playwright Jean Racine. Berenice was not played often between the 17th and the 20th centuries.

It was premiered on 21 November 1670 by the Comédiens du Roi at the Hôtel de Bourgogne. Racine seems to have chosen the subject in competition with Pierre Corneille, who was working on his drama Tite et Bérénice at the same time. The subject was taken from the Roman historian Suetonius, who recounts the story of the Roman emperor Titus and Berenice of Cilicia, the sister of Agrippa II. Suetonius wrote a single sentence on the affair: "Titus reginam Berenicen, cui etiam nuptias pollicitus ferebatur, statim ab Urbe dimisit invitus invitam." In his preface, Racine translates this as "Titus, who passionately loved Berenice and who was widely thought to have promised to marry her, sent her from Rome, in spite of himself and in spite of herself, in the early days of his empire."

== Characters ==
- Titus - the emperor of Rome
- Bérénice - queen of Palestine (Judea)
- Antiochus - the king of Comagène
- Paulin - a confidant of Titus
- Arsace - a confidant of Antiochus
- Phénice - a confidante of Bérénice
- Rutile - a Roman
- Servants, etc.

== Plot summary ==
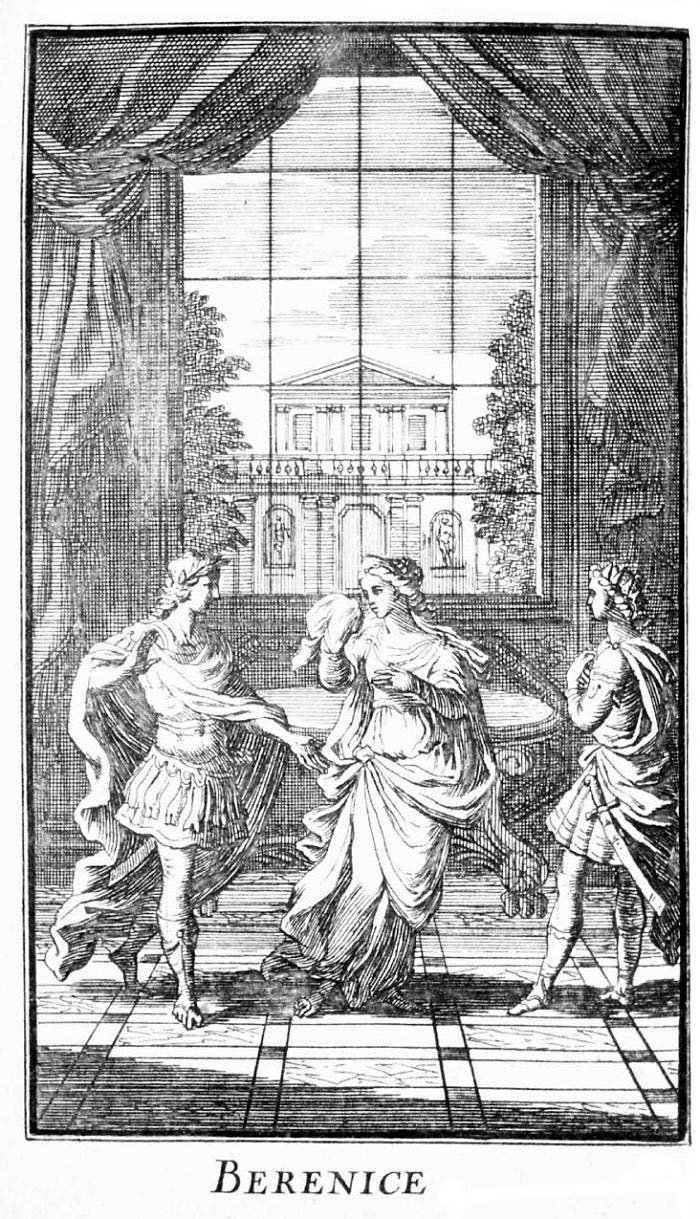
Frontispiece depicting Act V, scene 7, published in Paris in 1676

Because Titus' father, Vespasian, has died, everyone assumes that Titus will now be free to marry his beloved Bérénice, the queen of Palestine. Madly in love with Bérénice, Antiochus plans to flee Rome rather than face her marriage with his friend Titus. However, Titus has been listening to public opinion about the prospects of his marriage with a foreign queen, and the Romans find this match undesirable. Titus chooses his duty to Rome over his love for Bérénice and sends Antiochus to tell Bérénice the news. Knowing that Antiochus is Titus' rival, Bérénice refuses to believe Antiochus. However, Titus confirms that he will not marry her. Titus begs her to stay but she refuses both Antiochus and Titus. She and Antiochus leave Rome separately, and Titus remains behind to rule his empire.

== Analysis ==
The tragic situation results from two irreconcilable demands. Titus cannot sacrifice his mission as the head of Rome for his passion for Berenice. The drama could have been based on events which conspire to separate the lovers, but Racine chose rather to eliminate all events that could overshadow the one action that he retains: the announcement by Titus that he is leaving her. He has in fact already made his decision before the play begins, and all that remains is for him to announce it to her and for her to accept it. Their love for each other is never in doubt, there is never any personal danger, nothing distracts the attention of the audience. The great art of Racine is to make something out of nothing, as he says himself in the preface to the play. The tension reaches its climax at the end of the fourth act, when Titus explains his dilemma, and Berenice refuses his decision. In the fifth act, they both come to terms with their duty; contrary to other plays by the same author, neither seeks escape through death.
