= Rodogune =

Rodogune is a tragedy in five acts by the French playwright Pierre Corneille. It was first performed in 1644 and published in 1647.
