= Bellerose (actor) =

French actor and theatre manager

Bellerose or Belle-Rose (1592 – 1670) was the stage name of the French actor-manager Pierre le Messier. He was one of the leading tragedians of the first half of the 17th century.

He apprenticed with Valleran le Conte in 1609, performed in Bourges in 1619, and directed his own company in Marseille in 1620, but little else is known about his early career. He joined the Comédiens du Roi under Gros-Guillaume at the Hôtel de Bourgogne in 1622. He had a fine speaking voice and performed leading parts in comedies and tragedies, and also acted as the 'orator', the member of the company who formally addressed the audience. Some contemporaries regarded Bellerose as "insipid and affected" and preferred his arch-rival, the more aggressive Montdory at the Théâtre du Marais. After Gros-Guillaume's death in 1634, Bellerose became the leader of the Comédiens du Roi at the Bourgogne and remained in that position until 1647, when he is thought to have sold his interest in the company for a very high price to his brother-in-law Floridor. He was married to Mademoiselle Bellerose.

== Bibliography ==
- Forman, Edward (2010). Historical Dictionary of French Theater. Lanham: The Scarecrow Press. ISBN 9780810849396.
- Roy, Donald (1995). "Bellerose", p. 92, in The Cambridge Guide to the Theatre, edited by Martin Banham. Cambridge: Cambridge University Press. ISBN 9780521434379.
