= Clitandre =

1630 play by Pierre Corneille

Clitandre is the second play by Pierre Corneille and was published in 1630. It is dedicated to the duc de Longueville, who assisted Corneille when he was first starting to publish his plays. Corneille modified Clitandre several times, notably in 1660, in order to adapt the play to the tragedy genre which was very popular at the time.

The play did not enter into the repertoire of the Comédie-Française until 1996, due to the complex nature of the plot.

== Actors ==
- The King
- The Prince, son of the King
- Rosidor, the King's favorite and Caliste's lover.
- Clitandre, the Prince's favorite, also in love with Caliste but his love is not requited.
- Caliste, beloved by Rosidor and Clitandre
- Lysarque, Rosidor's squire
- Géronte, Clitandre's squire
- Cléon, gentleman
- Lycaste, Clitandre's page
- Prison Guard - "Le Geôlier"
- Three Archers
- Three Hunters

== Summary ==
Rosidor and Caliste love each other equally. Clitandre is also in love with Caliste, but she rebukes him. Dorise is the close friend of Caliste, but she is also in love with Rosidor. Pymante is in love with Dorise, but she refuses him.

Act I

Rosidor learns that Clitandre is his rival and declares to Lysarque that he wishes to duel him.

Dorise was previously able to delay Rosidor and Caliste's marriage, but she continues to grow more and more jealous. She decides the sole recourse is to kill Caliste. She convinces Caliste that Rosidor is betraying her with Hippolyte, in the hopes that this news will lure Caliste into a nearby forest.

At the same time, Pymante attempts to lead Rosidor into a trap of his own making, thanks to a false declaration written by Géronte in the name of his master Clitandre. Pymante, Géronte and Lycaste disguise themselves and attack Rosidor, who flees.

While fleeing, Rosidor finds himself in the same part of the forest as Caliste and Dorise, who is about to attempt to assassinate Caliste with a sword she found nearby. Rosidor slays Lycaste, breaks his sword, then takes the sword from Dorise without recognizing her. With this borrowed weapon, he kills Géronte, but Pymante flees. After seeing that the slain men are associated with Clitandre, Rosidor concludes that it must be he who organized the ambush. Rosidor is injured and Caliste helps him back to the castle.

Act II

Pymante hides in a nearby cave wherein he removes his mask and vows to kill Rosidor, his rival. He then runs into Lysarque and a group of archers, who are looking for the men responsible for the ambush. Pymante claims to know nothing about it and states that he was merely in the forest awaiting his mistress, which Lysarque believes.

During the ambush, Clitandre is with the Prince and explains to him that, despite his passion for Caliste, he could never bring himself to be violent. The King is alerted to the ambush and believes Clitandre responsible, so Clitandre is summoned before the King.

Dorise is still hiding in the forest and is afraid to return to the castle after attempting to assassinate Caliste. She disguises herself in the clothes of the deceased Géronte. Pymante arrives, but believes that Dorise is Géronte. He runs towards her as if to embrace her, but Dorise has the impression that he takes her to be Rosidor, as he stabs her non-fatally during their embrace. All the while believing the person before him in Géronte, Pymante agrees to hide him nearby in the forest. Pymante remarks that "Géronte" looks quite like Dorise and tells himself that either he will get rid of a witness to his crime, if it is Géronte, or he will be able to declare his love, if this is Dorise.

Act III

Rosidor and the King discuss, the King believes that Clitandre has betrayed him and that he is responsible for Rosidor's wounds. As Rosidor is the King's favorite, the King flys into a rage and condemns Clitandre to death that same day with no trial.

Pymante and Dorise are hiding and Dorise finally reveals her true identity. Despite Pymante's declarations of love, Dorise affirms that she is in love with Rosidor. Pymante becomes deeply jealous and decides to take Dorise captive and takes her by force into the cave.

Cléon and Lysarque discuss and they start to wonder if Clitandre is truly guilty. Cléon worries that an innocent man has been condemned to death.

Act IV

Pymante attempts to force himself on Dorise, who in response stabs one of his eyes out with a hairpin. Dorise escapes and hides. Pymante has a monologue wherein he declares that his love for Dorise has expired.

The Prince is out hunting and is unaware that Clitandre has been imprisoned and condemned. He is separated from his troops during a sudden storm. While walking, Dorise arrives on scene being chased by a sword-wielding Pymante. The Prince attempts to aide Dorise and Pymante starts to duel the Prince. Three Hunters arrive and speak with the Prince and the Prince finally realizes the true identities of Pymante and Dorise, who are still wearing their respective disguises. The Prince learns that Clitandre has been falsely accused and Cléon urges him to save his friend before it is too late.

Act V

The Prince arrives in time to confirm Clitandre's innocence and to ensure his release from prison. Clitandre expresses to the Prince that despite his former love for Caliste, he no longer wishes to marry her.

The King consents to the marriage of Caliste and Rosidor, and Pymante is sent before the Counsel to be judged for his crimes. The Prince and Caliste pardon Dorise for her actions, but Dorise worries her reputation is sullied due to Pymante abducting her. The play ends with the Prince proposing that Dorise marry Clitandre.

== Opinions of the play ==
In 1660, thirty years after the plays initial publication, Pierre Corneille added a preface in which he commented several aspects of Clitandre. He acknowledges that the monologues are "too long and too frequent" in the play but says that this was desirable at the time that the play was written. He also states that someone who only sees Clitandre performed once will have difficulties fully comprehending the plot.

Corneille recognizes that this play is of a different style than his other works, but he justifies this in saying that he took liberties in order to shock classic-style playwrights. He did not believe that the classical plays produced by the Ancient Greeks were examples of perfection, thus he sought to produce something new. He acknowledges that not all will like this new style.
