= Théâtre du Marais =

Theater in Paris, France

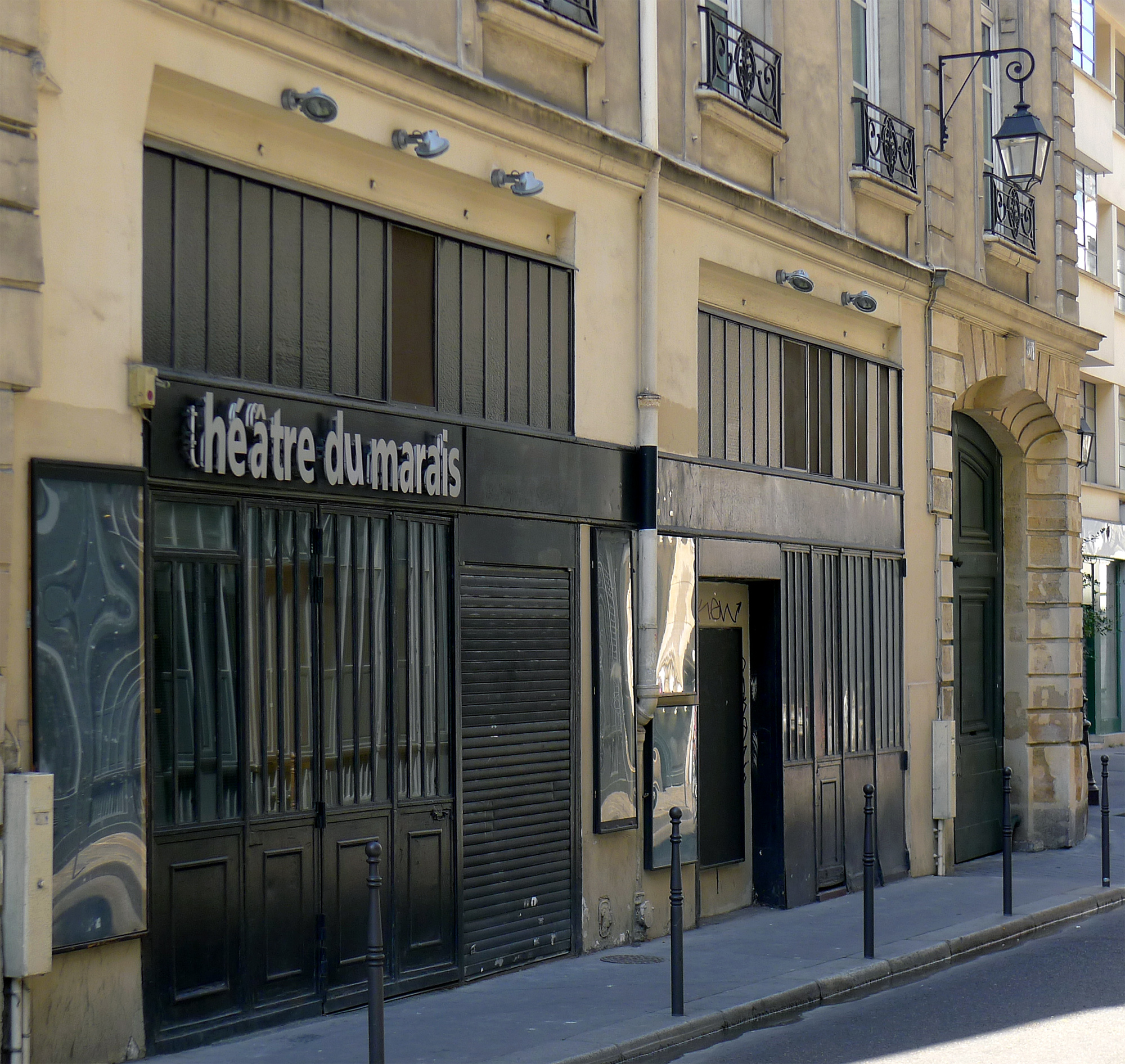
The present-day Théâtre du Marais

The Théâtre du Marais (French pronunciation: [teɑtʁ dy maʁɛ]) has been the name of several theatres and theatrical troupes in Paris, France. The original and most famous theatre of the name operated in the 17th century. The name was briefly revived for a revolutionary theatre in 1791, and revived again in 1976. The present-day Théâtre du Marais operates at 37, rue Volta in the 3rd arrondissement of Paris.

== First incarnation (1634–1673) ==
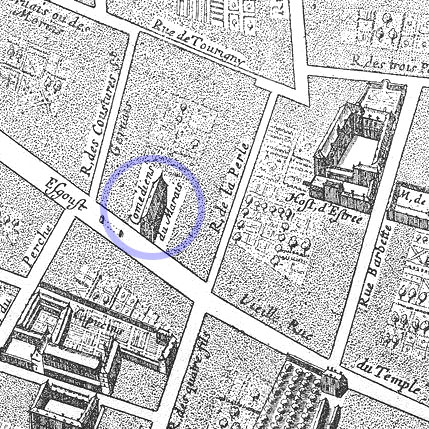
The Théâtre du Marais on the 1652 Gomboust map of Paris 48.86016°N 2.36135°E

The Théâtre du Marais was founded in 1634, at which time there had been only one theatre company in Paris, the comédiens du Roi ("comedians of the King"), at the Hôtel de Bourgogne. The actors Charles Lenoir and Montdory decided to create their own troupe, and situated it in the fashionable Le Marais district of Paris, where they converted the Jeu de Paume des "Maretz", an unused tennis court on the Vieille Rue du Temple opposite the Capuchins, into a theatre.

The new theatre's repertory was made up mainly of farces by Jodelet and works by Pierre Corneille; Corneille debuted Le Cid there in 1637. The actor Floridor entered the troupe in 1640, and quickly became a major star.

In 1643, the theatre was heavily damaged by a fire, and closed until its restoration was completed in October 1644. Upon its reopening, due to its technical innovations as a new theatre and being the first theatre to add a proscenium arch, it increasingly developed spectacular sets, with machinery helping to depict shipwrecks and cataclysms. Marie Champmeslé and her husband entered the troupe in 1669. Competition with the comédiens du Roi lasted until 1673, when the Théâtre du Marais was dissolved to join with Molière's troupe, forming the troupe du Roi at the Théâtre Guénégaud, and eventually part of the Comédie-Française.

== Second incarnation (1791–1807) ==
A new Théâtre du Marais was founded in 1791. It was built using materials recovered from the storming of the Bastille, and presented revolutionary spectacles. The house playwright was Pierre Beaumarchais. This theatre was forced to close in 1807 by Napoleon, and it was destroyed in 1812 to make room for the construction of public baths.

== Third incarnation (1976–present) ==
The current Théâtre du Marais was founded by Jacques Mauclair in 1976. It temporarily closed in 1999, but was reopened as part of the Cours Florent in May 2000.

== See also ==
- Hôtel de Bourgogne (theatre)
- Théâtre du Palais-Royal (rue Saint-Honoré)
