= La Galerie du Palais =

La Galerie du Palais is a 1632 comedy by Pierre Corneille. The comedy concerns the love relationships of two couples: Lysandre and Celidee; and Dorimant and Hippolyte.
