= Bellerose Belgium =

Belgian clothing company

- Industry: Retail
- Founded: 1989
- Founder: Jean Pierre Delhaye, Charly Bouvy, Patrick van Heurck
- Headquarters: Brussels, Belgium
- Products: Clothing, accessories
- Website: www.bellerose.be

Bellerose Belgium SA/NV is a Belgian clothing company, selling clothes under the Bellerose brand. They are headquartered in Groot-Bijgaarden, a suburb of Brussels.

Bellerose was started by Jean-Pierre Delhaye, Charly Bouvy, and Patrick Van Heurck in 1989 with a line of men's shirts. Bellerose was named after Bellerose, New York, a small American town just outside New York City, in a nod to the American referents to their approach to style. Van Heurck remains the primary owner and director of design.

Bellerose opened their first store in Knokke (by the Belgian coast) in 1990 or 1991. Later on, stores in Saint Germain Des Près and the Bastille area were opened, and in Kortrijk, Namur, and Brussels. In 2009 a store was opened in Antwerpen, next to the ModeMuseum Antwerpen (Museum of Fashion). As of 2013 Bellerose owned & operated 22 stores (including two in France) and their line was carried by many other stores worldwide.

A first women’s collection was released in 1998, followed by a children's line in 2002.

At the height of the Great Recession in 2009, the company was rumored to have experienced financial difficulties, but the company denied this and claimed to continue to thrive, and indeed planned expansion into markets such as Germany and Britain.
