= Mélite =

1625 play by Pierre Corneille

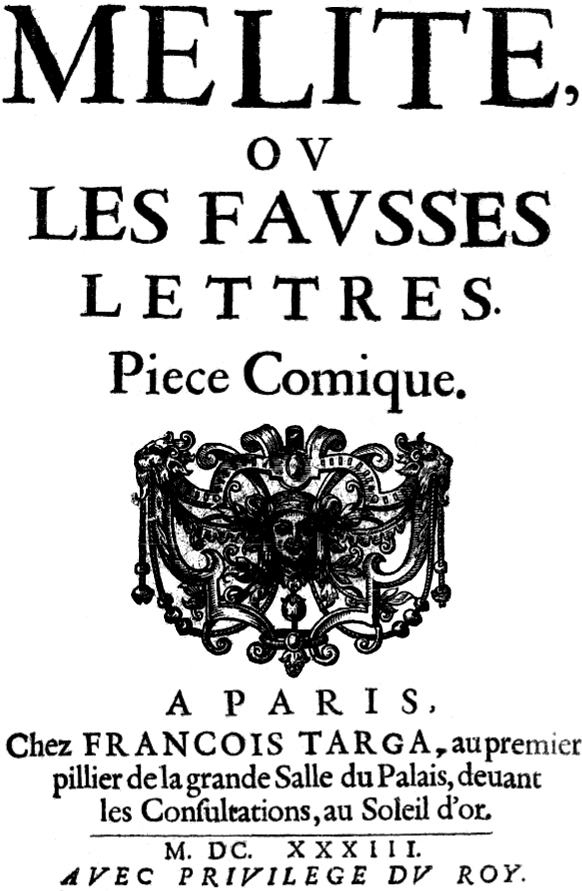
Title page of 1633 edition of Mélite.

Mélite, or The False Letters, is a comedy in five acts by Pierre Corneille. Written in 1625, it is Corneille's first play and debuted on stage in December 1629 in Berthaud's Jeu de paume court, and was performed by the acting troupe of Montdory. Mélite represents Corneille's creation of a new genre, the comedy of manners, which was a departure from the coarse or buffoonish farce in vogue at the time.

== Plot ==
It is said Corneille based his play on an actual event he witnessed. The plot turns on "the misunderstandings of lovers misled by false letters."

Éraste is in love with Mélite. When Éraste introduces Mélite to his friend Tircis, Mélite falls in love with Tircis. As a result, Éraste forges some love letters and sends them to Philandre as if they had come from Mélite.

The plan succeeds initially, as Tircis sees Philandre bearing these false letters and believes that Mélite is in love with Philandre. Tircis runs away in despair, and Mélite faints when she hears of this.

Now remorseful, Éraste goes mad and suffers from a delusion that he is in hell. Éraste searches for Mélite until he recovers from his madness. Éraste subsequently recovers and finds that Tircis and Mélite are set on marrying one another. Éraste confesses his acts and seeks pardon, and ultimately marries Cloris, Tircis' sister.

== Bibliography ==
- Madeleine Bertrand, « Corneille, homme de son temps: Le Thème de l’inconstance dans Mélite et Clitandre », L’Information littéraire, jan.-fév. 1982, n° 34 (1), p. 6–11.
- E. Brooks, « Sur la Mélite de Corneille : une dramaturgie réussie », Revue d’Histoire du Théâtre, avr.-juin 1984, n° 36 (2), p. 192–199.
- Ziad Elmarsafy, « Real Selves and False Letters in Corneille's Mélite », La Spiritualité/L’Épistolaire/Le Merveilleux au Grand Siècle, Tübingen, Narr, 2003, p. 169-77.
- Robert Garapon, « Le Premier Corneille : de Mélite à L’Illusion comique », Paris, CDU-Sedes, 1982.
- Joseph Harris, « Corneille Confronts the Ridiculous: Mélite », Nottingham French Studies, Spring 2007, n° 46 (1), p. 17–27.
- Lawrence E. Harvey, « The Denouement of Mélite and the Role of the Nourrice », Modern Language Notes, Mar 1956, n° 71 (3), p. 200-3.
- Alan Howe, « La Troupe du Marais et la première de Mélite (1629–1631) : trois documents inédits », Australian Journal of French Studies, Sept–Dec 1998, n° 35 (3), p. 279-94.
- Milorad R. Margitic, « Mythologie personnelle chez le premier Corneille : Le Jeu de l’amour et de l’amour-propre de Mélite au Cid », Pierre Corneille, Paris, PUF, 1985.
- Jacques Maurens, « Les Vraies Beautés de théâtre dans Mélite », Littératures, Automne 1981, n° 4, p. 21–30.
- Marie-Odile Sweetser, « De la comédie à la tragédie : le Change et la conversion de Mélite à Polyeucte », Corneille comique: Nine Studies of Pierre Corneille’s Comedy with an Introduction and a Bibliography, Paris, PFSCL, 1982, p. 75–89.
- Constant Venesoen, « Corneille apprenti féministe : de Mélite au Cid », Paris, Letts. Mods., 1986.
- Jean-Yves Vialleton, « Le Silence de Mélite », Œuvres et Critiques, 2005, n° 30 (2), p. 30 40
