= Guillén de Castro y Bellvis =

Spanish dramatist (1569–1631)

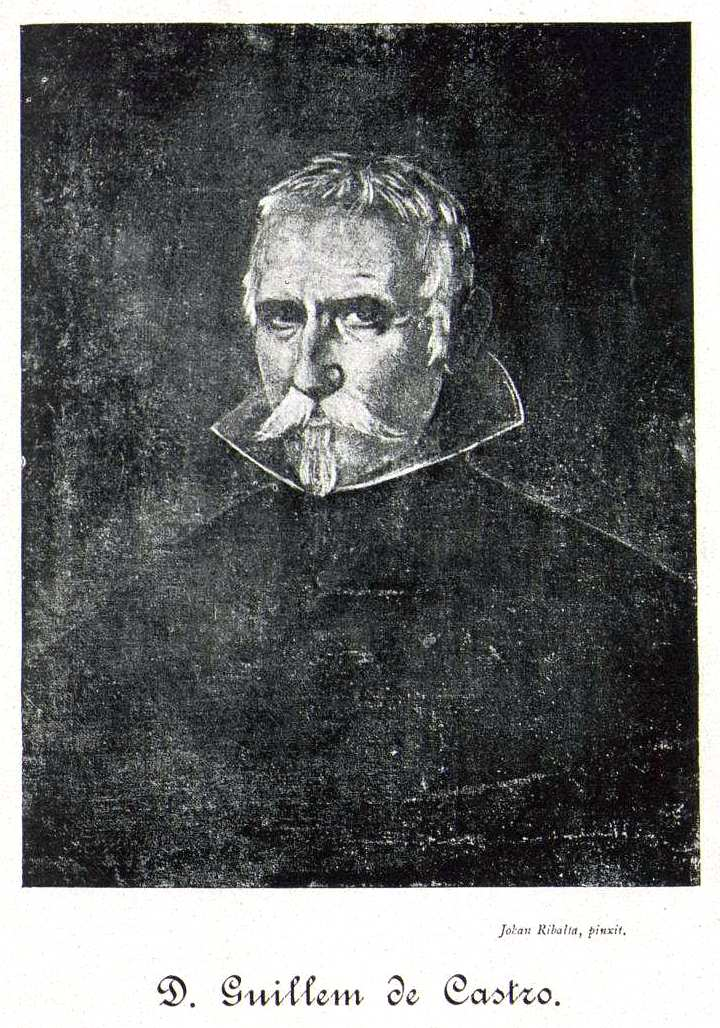
Guillén de Castro y Mateo, engraving from 1628 by Juan Ribalta.

Guillén de Castro y Mateo (1569 – 28 July 1631) was a Spanish dramatist of the Spanish Golden Age. He was distinguished member of the "Nocturnos", a Spanish version of the "Academies" in Italy.

== Life ==
A Valencian by birth, he soon achieved a literary reputation. In 1591 he joined a local literary academy called the Nocturnos. At one time a captain of the coast guard, at another the protégé of Benavente, viceroy of Naples, who appointed him governor of Scigliano, patronized by Pedro Téllez-Girón, 3rd Duke of Osuna and Gaspar de Guzmán, Count-Duke of Olivares, Castro was nominated a knight of the order of Santiago in 1623. He settled at Madrid in 1626, but died there in such poverty that his funeral expenses were defrayed by charity.

== Career ==
He probably made the acquaintance of Lope de Vega at the festivals (1620–1622) held to commemorate the beatification and canonization of St Isidore, the patron saint of Madrid. On the latter occasion Castro's octavas were awarded the first prize. Lope de Vega dedicated to him a celebrated play entitled Las Almenas de Toro (1619), and when Castro's Comedias were published in 1618-1621 he dedicated the first volume to Lope de Vega's daughter.

The drama that has made Castro's reputation is Las Mocedades del Cid (c. 1605–1615), to the first part of which Pierre Corneille was largely indebted for the materials of his tragedy. The two parts of this play, like all those by Castro, have the genuine ring of the old romances; and, from their intense nationality, no less than for their primitive poetry and flowing versification, were among the most popular pieces of their day.

Castro's Fuerza de la costumbre is the source of Love's Cure, a play in the John Fletcher canon. He is also the reputed author of El Prodigio de los Montes, from which Calderón derived El Mágico prodigioso. Sometime between 1605 and 1608, Castro wrote a comedia titled Don Quixote de la Mancha, a play based upon some parts of Cervantes' novel of the same name. The play includes a dramatisation of the story of Cardenio in the novel. Some critics believe that Castro's play may be a link between the Cardenio story in Cervantes' novel and William Shakespeare and John Fletcher's (now lost) 1612 play Cardenio.
