= Pierre Corneille =

French tragedian (1606–1684)

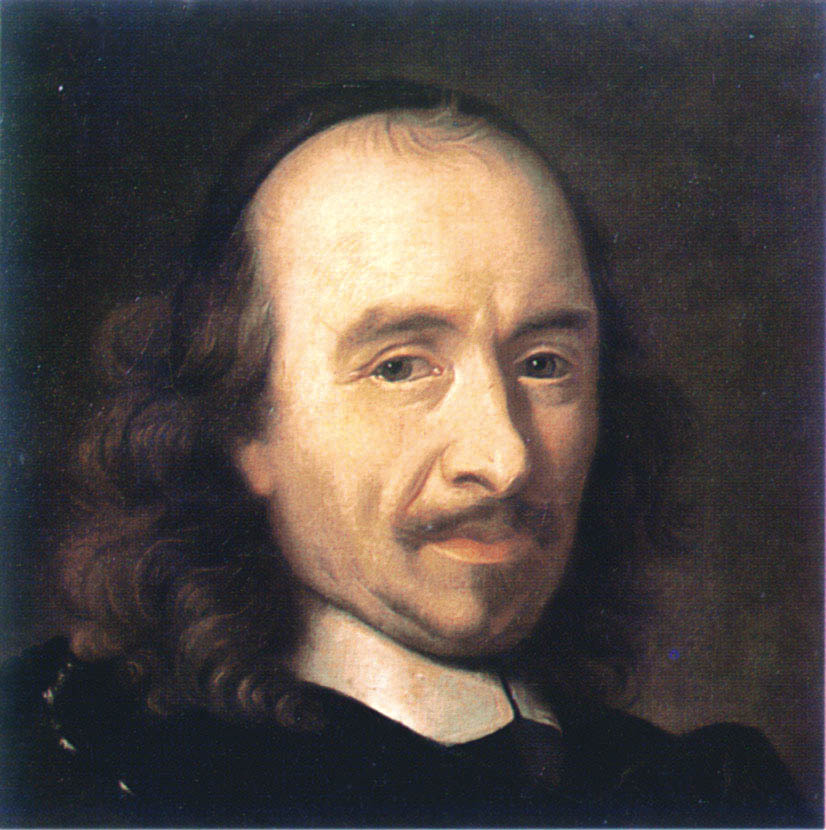
- Detail from a portrait by Charles Le Brun
- Born: 6 June 1606; Rouen, Kingdom of France
- Died: 1 October 1684 (aged 78); Paris, Kingdom of France
- Resting place: Saint-Roch, Paris
- Occupation: Playwright
- Spouse: Marie de Lampérière (m. 1641)
- Children: 7
- Relatives: Thomas Corneille
- Writing career
- Genres: Tragedy; comedy
- Notable work: Le Cid
- Literary movement: Classicism

Pierre Corneille (/kɔːrˈneɪ/ kor-NAY, French: [pjɛʁ kɔʁnɛj]; 6 June 1606 – 1 October 1684) was a French tragedian. He is generally considered one of the three great 17th-century French dramatists, along with Molière and Racine.

As a young man, he earned the valuable patronage of Cardinal Richelieu, who was trying to promote classical tragedy along formal lines, but later quarrelled with him, especially over his best-known play, Le Cid, about the medieval Spanish warrior, which was denounced by the newly formed Académie française for breaching the unities. He continued to write well-received tragedies for nearly forty years.

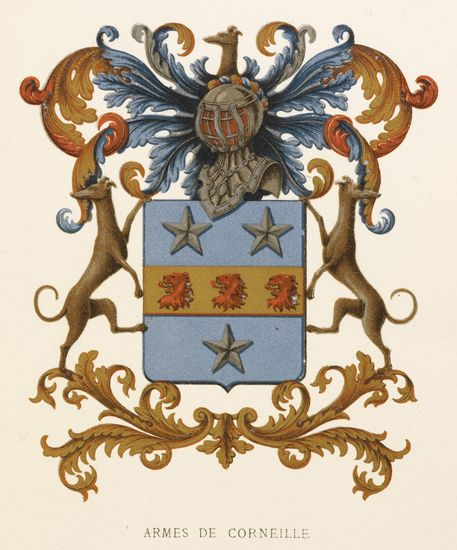
Coat of arms of the Corneille family, which dates back to 1637

== Biography ==
=== Early years ===
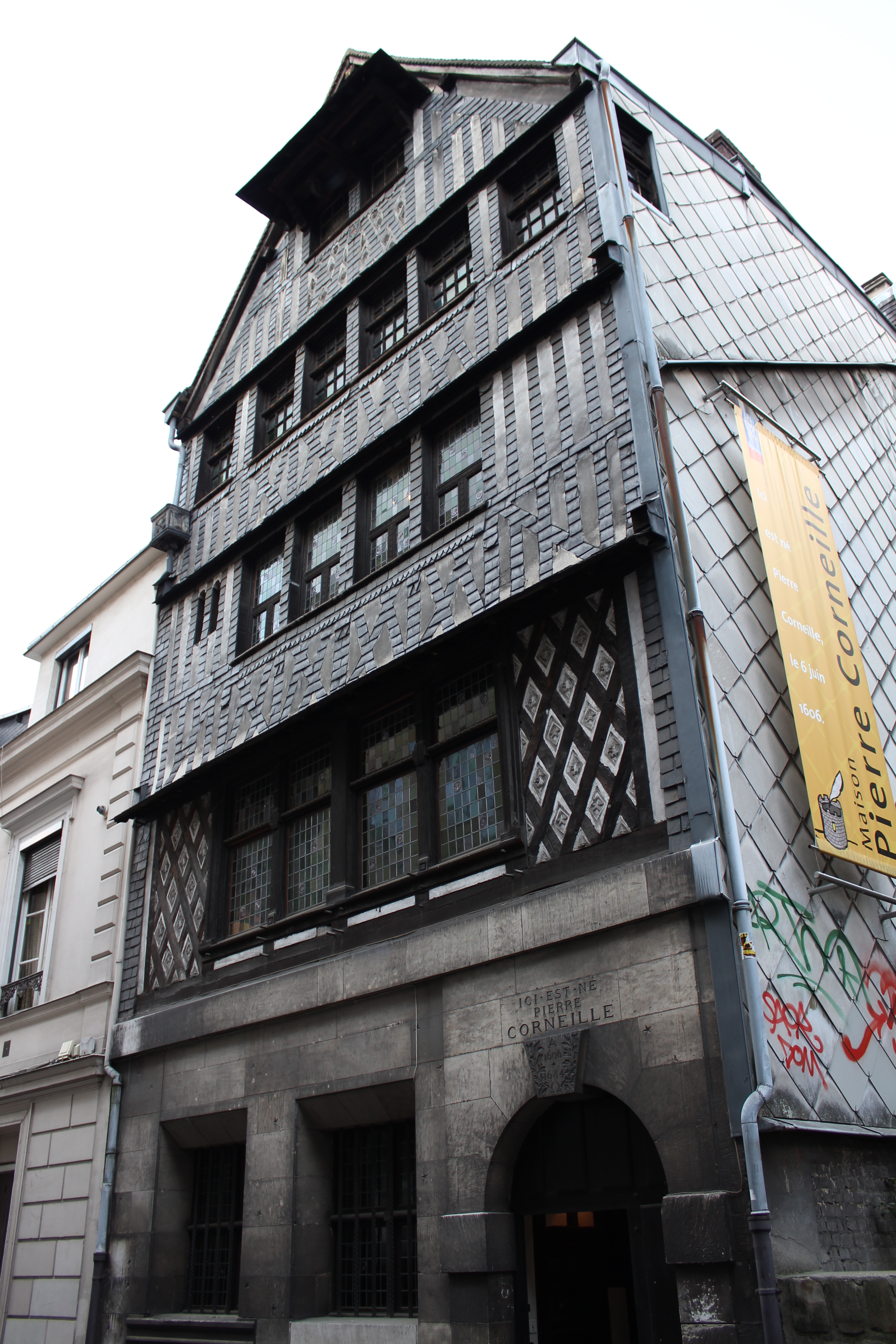
Home of the Corneille family in Rouen, where Corneille was born. It was turned into a museum dedicated to his work in 1920.

Corneille was born in Rouen, in the region of Normandy, to Marthe Le Pesant and Pierre Corneille, a distinguished lawyer. His younger brother, Thomas Corneille, also became a noted playwright. He was given a rigorous Jesuit education at the Collège de Bourbon (Lycée Pierre-Corneille since 1873), where acting on the stage was part of the training. At 18 he began to study law, but his practical legal endeavours were largely unsuccessful. Corneille's father secured two magisterial posts for him with the Rouen department of Forests and Rivers. During his time with the department, he wrote his first play. It is unknown exactly when he wrote it, but the play, the comedy Mélite, surfaced when Corneille brought it to a group of traveling actors in 1629. The actors approved of the work and made it part of their repertoire. The play was a success in Paris, and Corneille began writing plays on a regular basis. He moved to Paris in the same year and soon became one of the leading playwrights of the French stage. His early comedies, starting with Mélite, depart from the French farce tradition by reflecting the elevated language and manners of fashionable Parisian society. Corneille describes his variety of comedy as "une peinture de la conversation des honnêtes gens" ("a painting of the conversation of the gentry"). His first true tragedy is Médée, produced in 1635 .

=== Les Cinq Auteurs ===
The year 1634 brought more attention to Corneille. He was selected to write verses for Cardinal Richelieu's visit to Rouen. The Cardinal took notice of Corneille and selected him to be among Les Cinq Auteurs ("The Five Poets"; also translated as "the society of the five authors"). The others were Guillaume Colletet, Boisrobert, Jean Rotrou, and Claude de L'Estoile.

The five were selected to realize Richelieu's vision of a new kind of drama that emphasized virtue. Richelieu would present ideas, which the writers would express in dramatic form. However, the Cardinal's demands were too restrictive for Corneille, who attempted to innovate outside the boundaries defined by Richelieu. This led to contention between playwright and employer. After his initial contract ended, Corneille left Les Cinq Auteurs and returned to Rouen.

=== Querelle du Cid ===
In the years directly following this break with Richelieu, Corneille produced what is considered his finest play. Le Cid is based on the play Mocedades del Cid (1621) by Guillem de Castro. Both plays were based on the legend of Rodrigo Díaz de Vivar (nicknamed "El Cid Campeador"), a military figure in Medieval Spain.

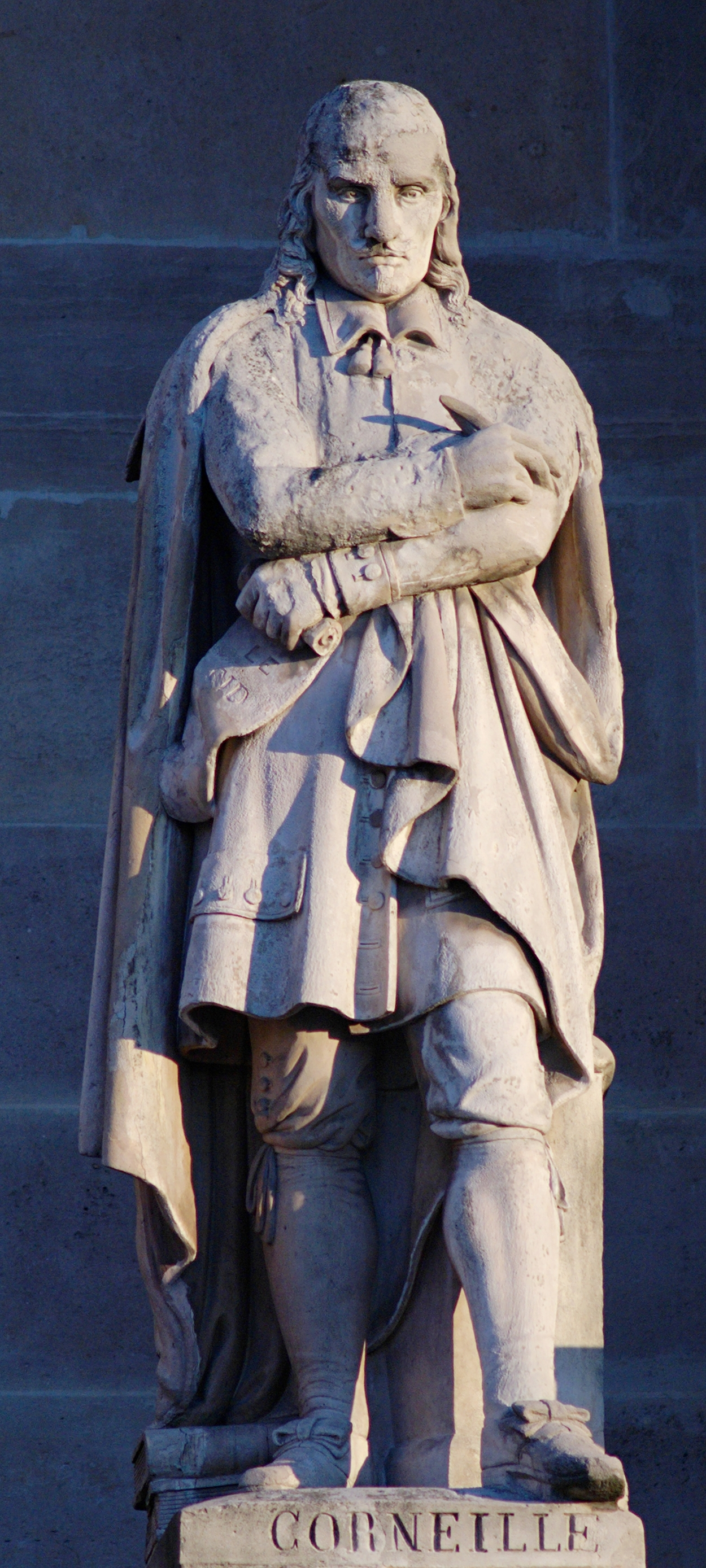
Corneille at the Louvre

The original 1637 edition of the play was subtitled a tragicomedy, acknowledging that it intentionally defies the classical tragedy/comedy distinction. Even though Le Cid was an enormous popular success, it was the subject of a heated argument over the norms of dramatic practice, known as the "Querelle du Cid" or "The Quarrel of Le Cid". Cardinal Richelieu's Académie française acknowledged the play's success, but determined that it was defective, in part because it did not respect the classical unities of time, place, and action (Unity of Time stipulated that all the action in a play must take place within a 24-hour time-frame; Unity of Place, that there must be only one setting for the action; and Unity of Action, that the plot must be centred on a single conflict or problem). The newly formed Académie was a body that asserted state control over cultural activity. Although it usually dealt with efforts to standardize the French language, Richelieu himself ordered an analysis of Le Cid.

Accusations of immorality were leveled at the play in the form of a famous pamphlet campaign. These attacks were founded on the classical theory that the theatre was a site of moral instruction. The Académie's recommendations concerning the play are articulated in Jean Chapelain's Sentiments de l'Académie française sur la tragi-comédie du Cid (1638). Even the prominent writer Georges de Scudéry harshly criticized the play in his Observations sur le Cid (1637). The intensity of this "war of pamphlets" was heightened severely by Corneille's boastful poem Excuse À Ariste, in which he rambled and boasted about his talents and claimed that no other author could be a rival. These poems and pamphlets were made public, one after the other, as once "esteemed" playwrights traded slanderous blows. At one point, Corneille took several shots at criticizing author Jean Mairet's family and lineage. Scudéry, a close friend of Mairet at the time, did not stoop to Corneille's level of "distastefulness", but instead continued to pillory Le Cid and its violations. Scudéry even stated of Le Cid that, "almost all of the beauty which the play contains is plagiarized."

This "war of pamphlets" eventually influenced Richelieu to call upon the Académie française to analyze the play. In their final conclusions, the academy ruled that even though Corneille had attempted to remain loyal to the unity of time, Le Cid broke too many of the unities to be a valued piece of work.

The controversy, coupled with the academy's ruling proved too much for Corneille, who decided to return to Rouen. When one of his plays was reviewed unfavorably, Corneille was known to withdraw from public life. He remained publicly silent for some time; privately, however, he was said to be "troubled and obsessed by the issues, making numerous revisions to the play."

=== Response to the Querelle du Cid ===
After a hiatus from the theater, Corneille returned in 1640. The Querelle du Cid caused Corneille to pay closer attention to classical dramatic rules. This was evident in his next plays, which were classical tragedies, Horace (1640, dedicated to Richelieu), Cinna (1643), and Polyeucte (1643). These three plays and Le Cid are collectively known as Corneille's "Classical Tetralogy". Corneille also responded to the criticisms of the Académie by making multiple revisions to Le Cid to make it closer to the conventions of classical tragedy. The 1648, 1660, and 1682 editions were no longer subtitled "tragicomedy", but "tragedy".

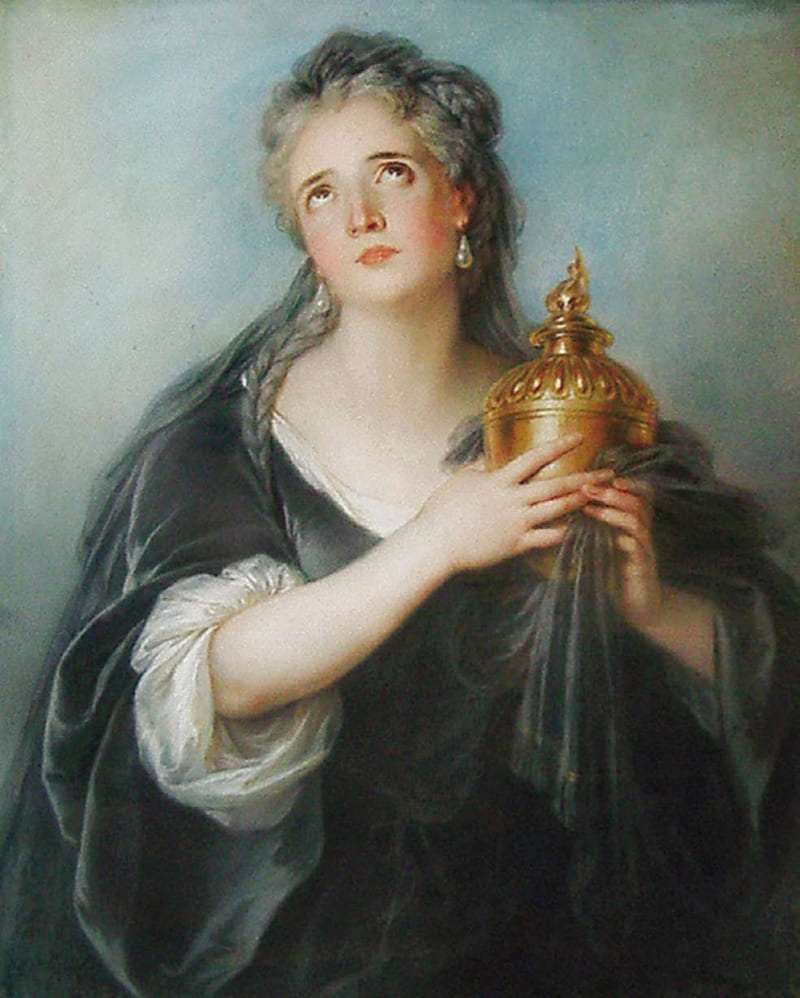
Adrienne Lecouvreur as Cornelia in The Death of Pompey

Corneille's popularity grew and by the mid-1640s, the first collection of his plays was published. Corneille married Marie de Lampérière in 1641. They had seven children together. In the mid to late 1640s, Corneille produced mostly tragedies, La Mort de Pompée (The Death of Pompey, performed 1644), Rodogune (performed 1645), Théodore (performed 1646), and Héraclius (performed 1647). He also wrote one comedy in this period, Le Menteur (The Liar, 1644).

In 1652, the play Pertharite met with poor critical reviews and a disheartened Corneille decided to quit the theatre. He began to focus on an influential verse translation of The Imitation of Christ by Thomas à Kempis, which he completed in 1656. After an absence of nearly eight years, Corneille was persuaded to return to the stage in 1659. He wrote the play Oedipe, which was favored by Louis XIV. In the next year, Corneille published Trois discours sur le poème dramatique (Three Discourses on Dramatic Poetry), which were, in part, defenses of his style. These writings can be seen as Corneille's response to the Querelle du Cid. He simultaneously maintained the importance of classical dramatic rules and justified his own transgressions of those rules in Le Cid. Corneille argued the Aristotelian dramatic guidelines were not meant to be subject to a strict literal reading. Instead, he suggested that they were open to interpretation. Although the relevance of classical rules was maintained, Corneille suggested that the rules should not be so tyrannical that they stifle innovation.

=== Later plays ===
Even though Corneille was prolific after his return to the stage, writing one play a year for the 14 years after 1659, his later plays did not have the same success as those of his earlier career. Other writers were beginning to gain popularity. In 1670 Corneille and Jean Racine, one of his dramatic rivals, were challenged to write plays on the same incident. Each playwright was unaware that the challenge had also been issued to the other. When both plays were completed, it was generally acknowledged that Corneille's Tite et Bérénice (1671) was inferior to Racine's play (Bérénice). Molière was also prominent at the time and Corneille even composed the comedy Psyché (1671) in collaboration with him (and Philippe Quinault). Most of the plays that Corneille wrote after his return to the stage were tragedies. They included La Toison d'or (The Golden Fleece, 1660), Sertorius (1662), Othon (1664), Agésilas (1666), and Attila (1667).

He wrote his last piece Suréna in 1674; it was a complete failure. After this, he retired from the stage for the final time and died at his home in Paris in 1684. His grave in the Église Saint-Roch went without a monument until 1821.

== Legacy ==
The dramatist, author and philosopher Voltaire created, with the support of the Académie française, a twelve-volume annotated set of Corneille's dramatic works, the Commentaires sur Corneille. It was Voltaire's largest ever work of literary criticism. Voltaire's proposal to the Académie described Corneille as doing for the French language what Homer had done for Greek: showing the world that it could be a medium for great art. Voltaire was driven to defend classic French literature in the face of increasingly popular foreign influences such as William Shakespeare. This is reflected in the first edition of the Commentaires, published in 1764, which focused on Corneille's better works and had relatively muted criticisms. By the second edition, published ten years later, Voltaire had come to a more negative assessment of Corneille and a stronger view on the need for objective criticism. He added five hundred critical notes, covering more works and taking a more negative tone. Critics' opinions of Corneille were already highly polarised. Voltaire's intervention polarised the debate further and some critics saw his criticisms as pedantic and driven by envy. In the 19th century, the tide of opinion turned against Voltaire. Napoleon expressed a preference for Corneille over Voltaire, reviving the former's reputation as a dramatist while diminishing the latter's.

In Episode 31 of the 1989 video lecture series, “The Western Tradition”, UCLA Professor Eugen Weber offers further commentary on Mssr. Corneille's work:

"But remember that Corneille’s plays were directed to an aristocracy that couldn’t be touched by sermons, by moralizing, by sentimentalism. So he touched them by showing the greatness of self-discipline and self-denial, of not doing what you want, but what you should do. And note that Corneille didn’t say, as a Christian would, that doing your duty makes you good, he said that doing your duty makes you great. When Corneille presented the struggle between passion and duty, it wasn’t a new invention. What was new in Corneille was that he showed one legitimate passion opposed to another passion that was equally legitimate. It was important to elevate the debate from a contest between right and wrong to a contest between two rights. Because a gentleman who got into a fight could not admit that he was wrong, but if you started by stipulating that his motives were honorable, he would at least stop to consider your argument, which is what Corneille achieved by raising the debate to a higher plane. And the seventeenth-century people who loved his adventure stories felt vaguely that they were getting in them something they hadn’t quite known before. And they were right. They hadn’t known it before for the simple reason that it had gone out with the Greeks. Roman thought was too legalistic, Christian thought was too simplistic to tolerate the idea that there could be two rights, that there could be two sides to a conflict. This is a very sophisticated view, and it is only fit for very sophisticated minds. And the tiny minority of the seventeenth-century society that read Corneille, that saw Corneille’s plays, was hardly very sophisticated, but it was beginning to try at least."

== List of works ==
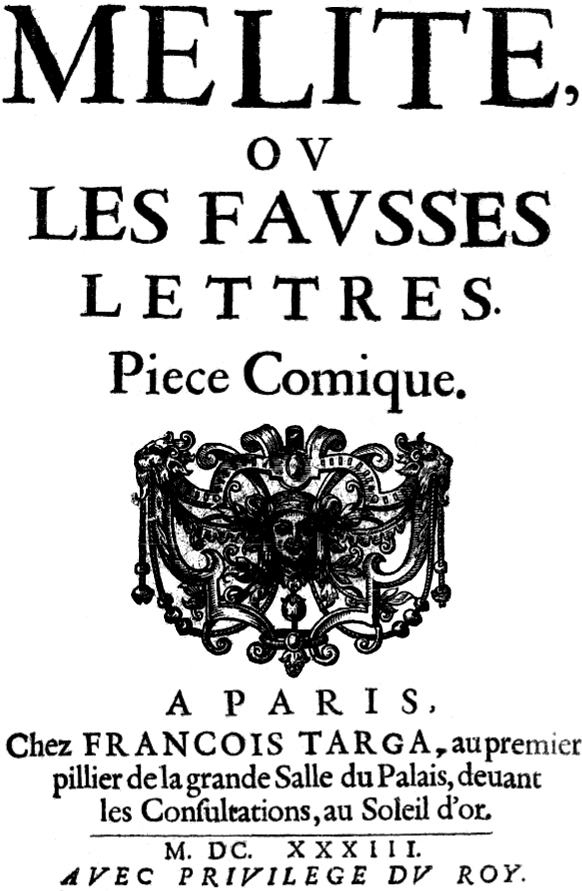
Mélite, 1633 edition

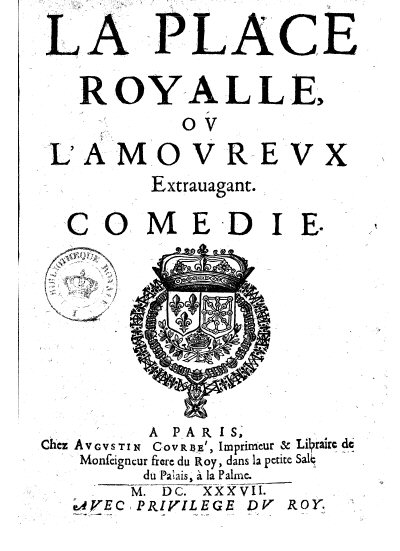
La Place royale, 1637 edition

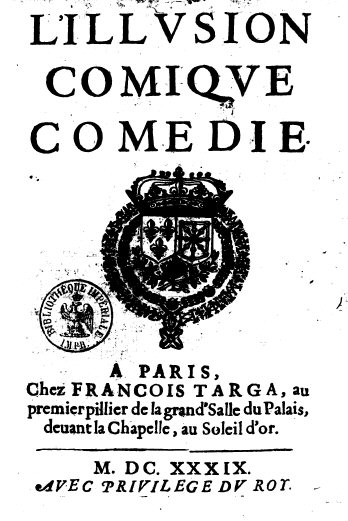
L'Illusion comique, 1639 edition

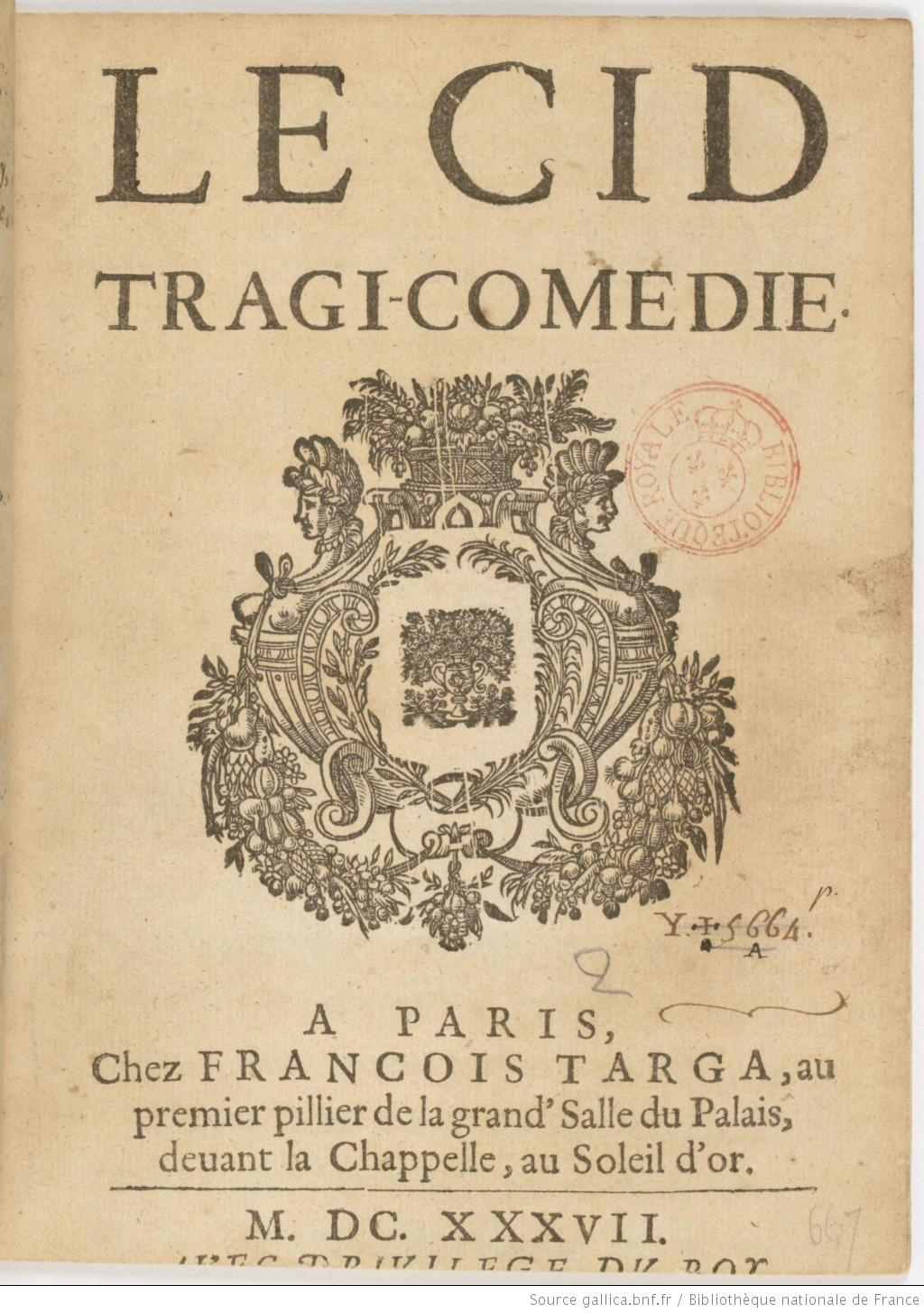
Le Cid, 1637 edition

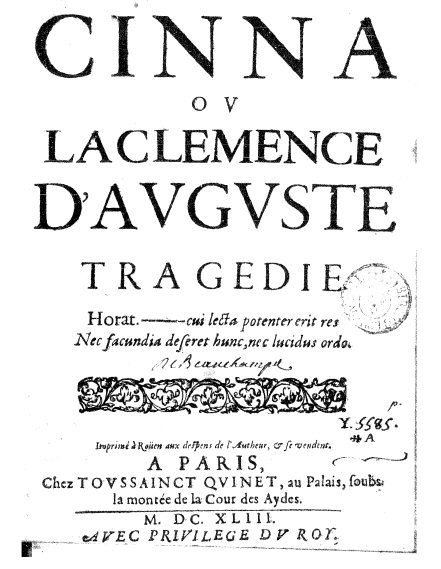
Cinna, 1643 edition

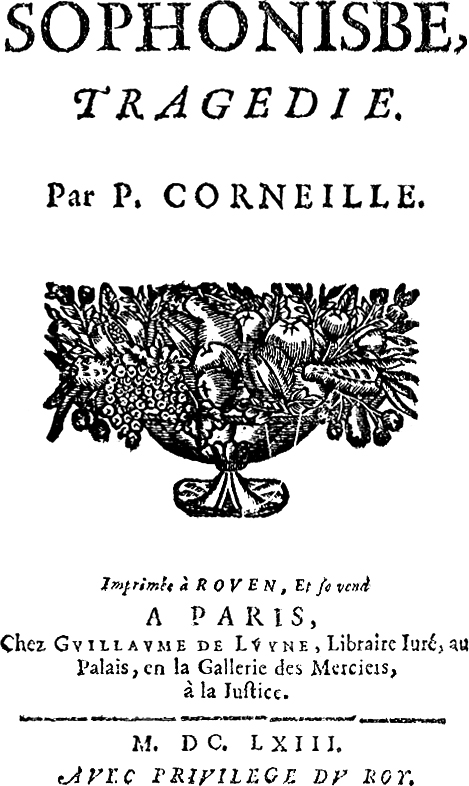
Sophonisbe, 1663 edition
- Mélite (1629)
- Clitandre (1630–31)
- La Veuve (1631)
- La Galerie du Palais (1631–32)
- La Suivante (1634)
- La Place royale (1633–34)
- La Comédie des Tuileries (by Les Cinq Auteurs, Act III by Corneille, 1635)
- Médée (1635)
- L'Illusion comique (1636)
- Le Cid (1637)
- Horace (1640)
- Polyeucte (1642)
- La Mort de Pompée (1643)
- Cinna (1643)
- Le Menteur (1643)
- Rodogune (1644)
- La Suite du Menteur (1645)
- Théodore (1645)
- Héraclius (1647)
- Don Sanche d'Aragon (1650)
- Andromède (1650)
- Nicomède (1651)
- Pertharite (1651)
- L'Imitation de Jésus-Christ (1656)
- Oedipe (1659)
- Trois Discours sur le poème dramatique (1660)
- La Toison d'or (1660)
- Sertorius (1662)
- Sophonisbe (1663)
- Othon (1664)
- Agésilas (1666)
- Attila (1667)
- Tite et Bérénice (1670)
- Psyché (with Molière and Philippe Quinault, 1671)
- Pulchérie (1672)
- Suréna (1674)

== See also ==
- Cornelian dilemma, named after Corneille
