= Don Juan (Molière play) =

1665 play by Moliere

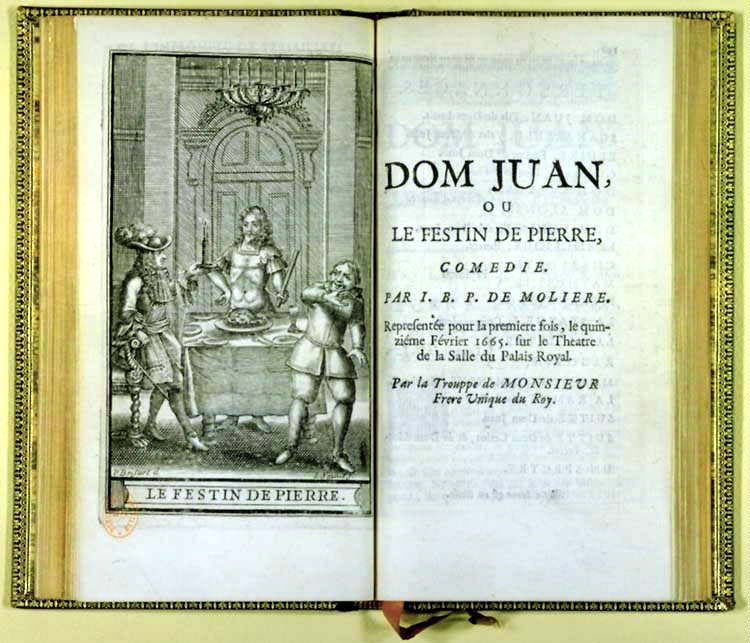
- The censored edition of Dom Juan ou le Festin de pierre (1683), by Molière, features an illustration of the statue at the feast.
- Original language: French
- Written by: Molière
- Based on: Don Juan legend, particularly The Trickster of Seville and the Stone Guest (1630)
- Characters: Don Juan; Sganarelle; Donna Elvira; Guzmán; Don Carlos
- Genre: tragic comedy
- Setting: Sicily

Premiere
- Date: 15 February 1665
- Place: Théâtre du Palais-Royal (rue Saint-Honoré)

Don Juan (French: Dom Juan ou le Festin de Pierre, "Don Juan, or, The Feast with the Stone [Statue]") is a five-act 1665 comedy by Molière based upon the Spanish legend of Don Juan Tenorio. The aristocrat Don Juan is a rake who, while charming and intelligent, moves from woman to woman, seducing and ruining them. He confides in his servant Sganarelle who acts as a weak and ineffective voice of conscience trying to tame his master's vices. Before the play has begun, Don Juan has already slain the Commander and seduced Donna Elvira, a noble lady, away from her vows to the Church, yet abandoned her rather than live in marriage with her. Don Juan and Sganarelle navigate society as he tries to continue his conquests while attempting to evade any responsibility or debt.

Molière's comedy derives from the Spanish play The Trickster of Seville and the Stone Guest (1630), by Tirso de Molina. However, each playwright presents a different interpretation of the libertine protagonist. Molière's Don Juan is a rationalist, atheist, and free-thinker; whereas de Molina's Don Juan is Catholic who genuinely believes that repentance is possible and that he can still be admitted to Heaven. Molière's Don Juan doubts and tests the ghosts sent to encourage him to repentance, challenging them with a sword, and mockingly invites a statue of the dead Commander to dinner, and even accepts the possessed statue's reversed invitation back for Don Juan to dine with him in the afterlife. As a villain, he is able to point out the rewards of religious hypocrisy, in that those who most loudly claim to be religious could well have selfish motives. Both characters suffer a terrible fate of being dragged to Hell; for the Spanish version, because he tried to delay repentance for a dissolute life too late; for Molière's version, in that he doubted the power of the divine to stop him.

Throughout the plot of Don Juan, the valet Sganarelle is the only character who defends religion, and his superstitious Catholicism is a thematic and intellectual foil to Don Juan's free-thinking disregard for religion and social and sexual norms. In early 1665, after fifteen performances of the original run of Don Juan, the French royal authorities halted performances of the play; Molière then had to defend the play and himself against accusations of irreligiosity and political subversion: that the playwright Molière was celebrating a libertine life by positively portraying a rake, thus the intent of the play is disrespectful of the official doctrine of the Church, and thus subversive of the royal authority of the king of France. The consequent state-and-church censorship legally compelled Molière to delete socially subversive scenes and irreligious dialogue from the script, notably the scene where Sganarelle and Don Juan encounter a pauper in the forest, in Act III.

In 1682, the prose edition of Dom Juan ou le Festin de pierre was censored, with paper strips glued upon the offensive text, for inclusion to an eight-volume edition of the plays of Molière. The censored, verse edition Le Festin de pierre (1677) by Thomas Corneille changed the style of writing — and thus changed the intent of the play — by exaggerating Don Juan's libertinism to render Molière's comedy of manners into a cautionary tale of the unhappy fate of irreligious people.

== Plot ==
Don Juan must simultaneously convince Charlotte and Mathurine that his affections for her are genuine, and the other one is delusional, while Sganarelle watches

Don Juan presents the story of the last two days of life of the Sicilian courtier Don Juan Tenorio, who is a young, libertine aristocrat known as a seducer of women and as an atheist. Throughout the story, Don Juan is accompanied by his valet, Sganarelle, a truculent and superstitious, cowardly and greedy man who engages his master in intellectual debates. The many facets of Don Juan's personality are exposed to show that he is an adulterer (Act I); an accomplished womanizer (Act II); an altruistic, religious non-conformist (Act III); a spendthrift, bad son to his father (Act IV); and a religious hypocrite who pretends a spiritual rebirth and return to the faith of the Roman Catholic Church, which is foiled by death (Act V).

=== Act I ===
In the garden of the palace. After a few words of appreciation for snuff tobacco, Sganarelle speaks with Guzmán, the squire to Donna Elvira. Her primary concern is the abrupt departure of her new husband, Don Juan. For Guzmán, Sganarelle proudly paints a terrible portrait of his master, Don Juan, as a fickle, cynical disbeliever whom women should distrust. Guzmán exits and Don Juan enters to argue with Sganarelle about the topic of marriage and amorous inconstancy, before revealing that he has fallen in love and has his sight set on someone new — a young, rustic bride-to-be. Donna Elvira then enters to challenge Don Juan to explain the reasons for his abrupt departure; his response leaves her angered.

=== Act II ===
In the countryside. Speaking in rustic vernacular, the peasant Pierrot tells his bride, Charlotte, of the adventure of his rescue of Don Juan and Sganarelle after they had fallen into the lake when their boat capsized. Pierrot then exits to go "wet his whistle", and Don Juan and Sganarelle appear. Don Juan tells Charlotte that he is in love with her, and persuades her to marry him. As Don Juan is about to kiss Charlotte's hand a thousand times, Pierrot returns and intervenes. Then appears Mathurine, yet another woman Don Juan promised to marry. Two fiancées, and both demand an explanation. Don Juan manages to inveigle his way out of girl trouble, leaving each woman believing that all is well between him and her. A man enters with the news that Don Juan is in danger — twelve men on horseback are looking for him. Don Juan says to Sganarelle that they should exchange clothes with each other. Sganarelle says "Not likely.", and they hurry off.

=== Act III ===
In the forest. Enter Don Juan in country costume and Sganarelle in doctor costume. They are lost and encounter a pauper dressed in rags, and ask him for directions through the forest. Learning that the pauper is religious and devout, Don Juan tests the man's faith by offering him a gold piece to blaspheme; the pauper refuses. Then Don Juan sees a gentleman being attacked by three robbers, so he draws his sword and goes to his rescue. The gentleman turns out to be Don Carlos, a brother of Donna Elvira, who explains to Don Juan that he and his brother, Don Alonso, have been hunting for Don Juan to avenge his seduction of their sister. Pretending ignorance, and not admitting his identity, Don Juan says he knows Don Juan but that he is only an acquaintance, not a friend. Don Alonso arrives. He recognizes Don Juan and demands immediate revenge. In gratitude to Don Juan for saving him from robbers, Don Carlos persuades his brother, Don Alonso, to postpone his revenge. The brothers exit. Continuing on their way in the forest, Don Juan and Sganarelle find themselves at the tomb of the Commander, a man recently killed by Don Juan. He orders Sganarelle to invite the statue of the Commander to dinner. The stone statue nods his head to the valet.

=== Act IV ===
In his apartment, Don Juan wants to sit for dinner, but he is interrupted by a series of unannounced visitors. First is the creditor Monsieur Dimanche, a tradesman whom Don Juan placates with many compliments, but then he snubs Dimanche by suddenly exiting the room. Sganarelle enters to usher out Dimanche from the apartment. Don Juan's father Don Louis arrives. He scolds Don Juan and then leaves, angry with contempt. Donna Elvira enters, no longer furious, but with loving, wifely spirit to warn her husband against the wrath of Heaven. She attempts in vain to persuade Don Juan to repent his sins. She leaves him alone. Finally, Don Juan and Sganarelle sit to dinner, when the statue of the Commander appears; he does not join them at the table, but he does invite Don Juan to sup with him the following day.

=== Act V ===
In the countryside near the city, Don Juan tells his father that Heaven has changed him and that he has renounced his wicked ways. Happy at hearing that news from his son, Don Louis leaves. The news of repentance and reformation also delight Sganarelle, but Don Juan immediately says he meant none of it, and then passionately speaks at length in praise of hypocrisy. Then Don Carlos appears, and a duel appears inevitable.

The specter of a veiled woman appears to offer Don Juan a final opportunity to repent his sins. Don Juan draws and brandishes his sword at the spectral woman, and he refuses to repent. The statue of the Commander enters and asks Don Juan to give him his hand. When Don Juan does that, the Commander proclaims: "The wages of sin is death". At that moment, Don Juan cries out that he is burning, that he is afire. Thunder and lightning sound and flash, and the earth breaks open to swallow Don Juan, whose fall is followed by flames. Seeing that his master is gone, the lonely valet Sganarelle bewails the loss of his wages.

== Characters and premiere cast ==
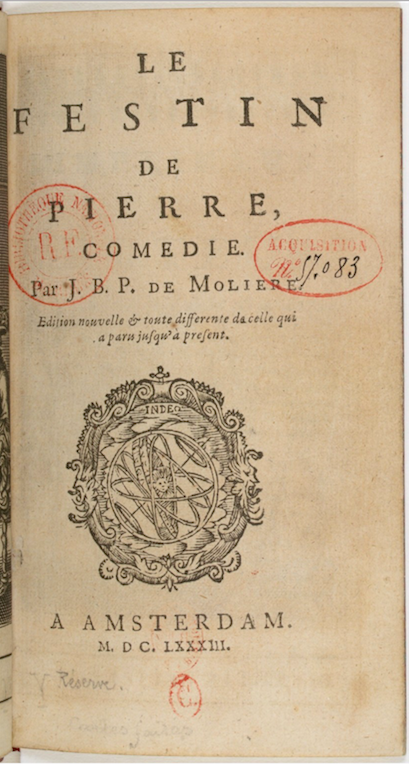
Title page of the uncensored edition of Le festin de pierre, by Molière. (Amsterdam, 1683)

Character	Cast of the play's premiere performance (15 February 1665)
Don Juan, son of Don Louis	La Grange
Sganarelle, servant to Don Juan	Molière
Donna Elvira, wife of Don Juan	Mademoiselle Du Parc
Guzmán, gentleman-usher to Donna Elvira	
Don Carlos, brother of Donna Elvira	
Don Alonzo, brother of Donna Elvira	
Don Louis, father of Don Juan	Louis Bejart
Charlotte, a peasant woman, fiancée to Pierrot	Mademoiselle de Brie
Mathurine, a peasant woman	Mademoiselle Molière
Pierrot, a peasant	André Hubert
A Pauper	possibly La Thorillière?
The Statue of the Commander	possibly La Thorillière?
Violette, servant to Don Juan	
Ragotin, servant to Don Juan	
Monsieur Dimanche, a tradesman	Du Croisy (Philibert Gassot)
La Ramée, a swashbuckler	De Brie (Edmé Villequin)
A Ghost (in the form of a veiled woman)	possibly Madeleine Béjart?

== Gallery ==
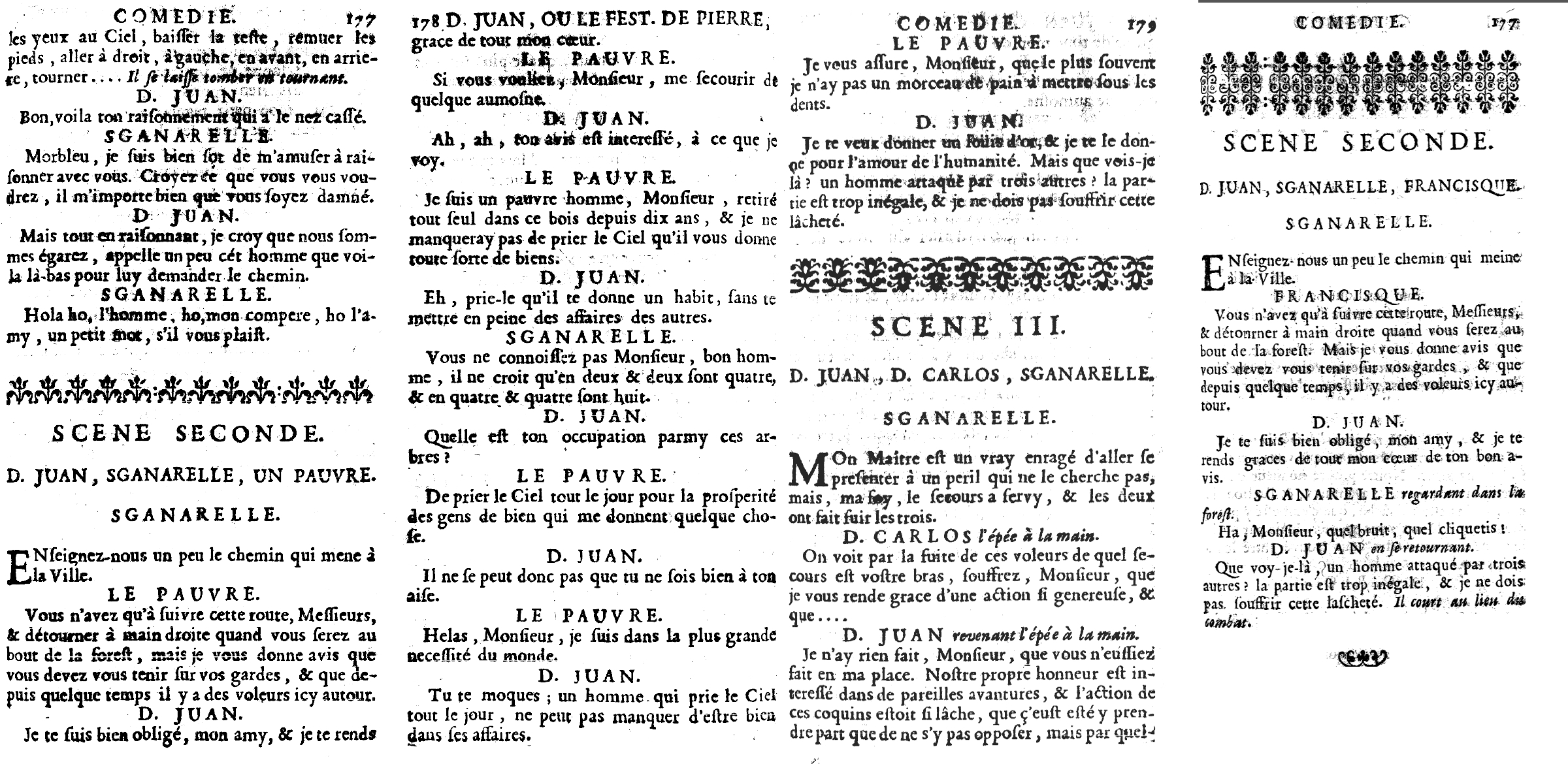
A comparison of the scene of Don Juan attempting to convince a desperately poor but religious man to blaspheme for money in the original (left) and the censored, much shorter version (right)

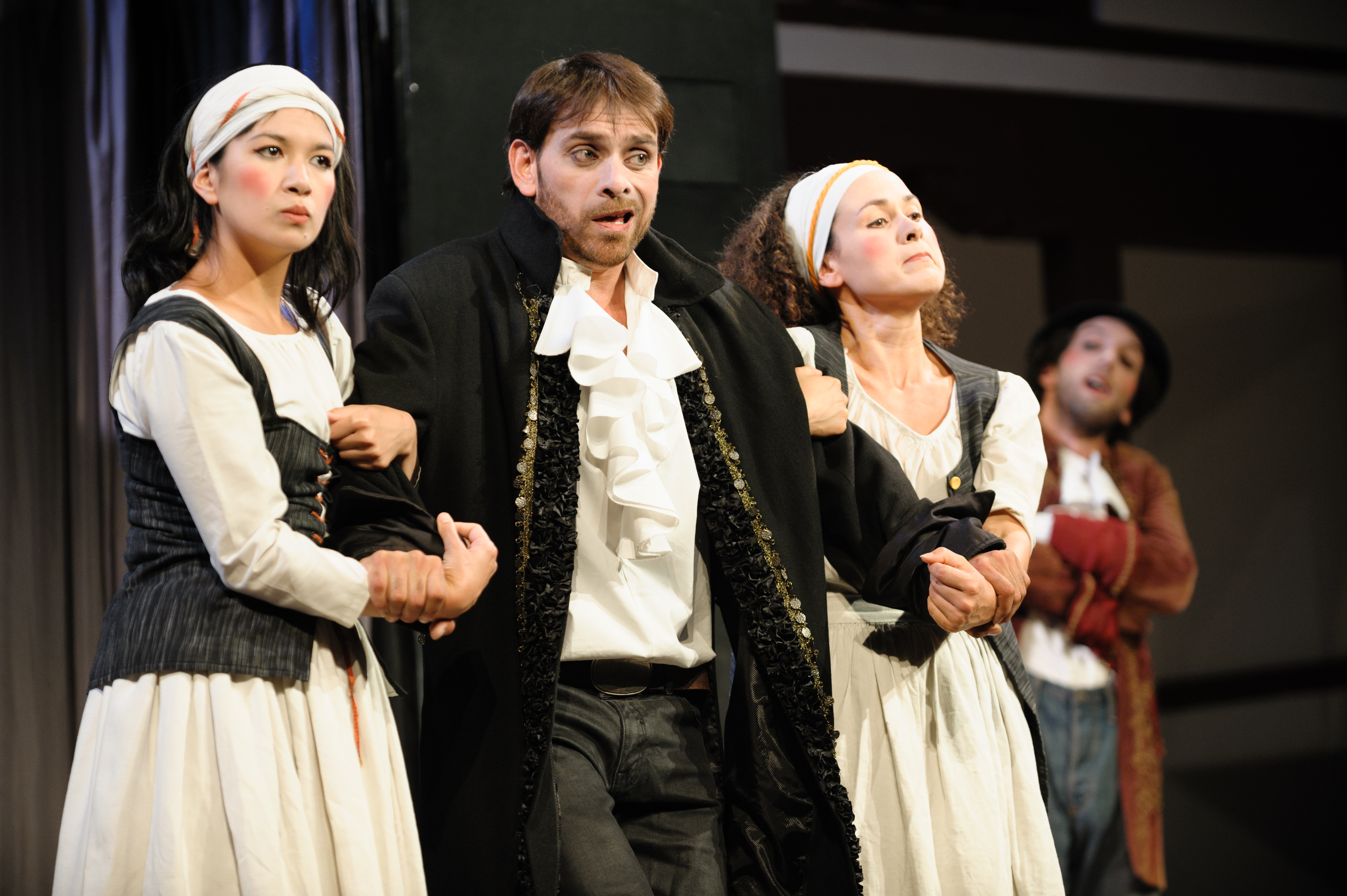
A 2012 production, showing Don Juan attempting to explain himself to the ladies he has promised his love toward

== Adaptations ==
A French-language film adaptation, Don Juan, was released in 1998. While Molière's version is the main source, it takes various liberties with the material, as expected for adaptations.
