= George Dandin ou le Mari confondu =

French Comédie-ballet in three acts by Molière

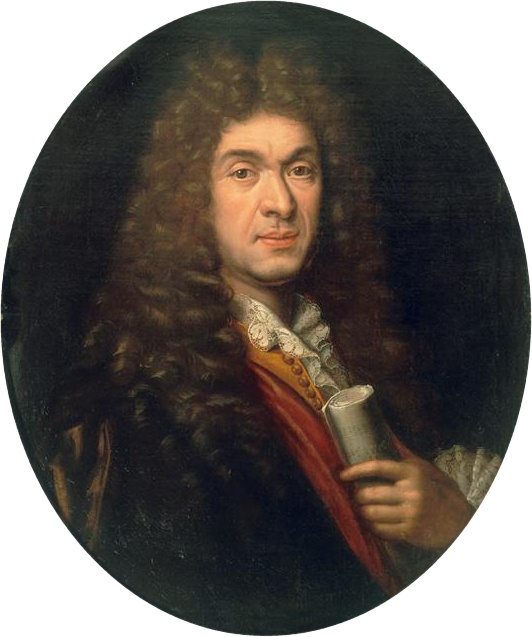
Portrait of Jean-Baptiste Lully

George Dandin ou le Mari confondu (George Dandin or The Thwarted Husband) is a French Comédie-ballet in three acts by Molière, with music by Jean-Baptiste Lully, choreography by Pierre Beauchamp, and architecture/staging by Carlo Vigarani and Henri de Gissey. It premiered at the Palace of Versailles, seen by Louis XIV and guests, numbering possibly to 3000 total people, on 18 July 1668, during the Le Grand divertissement royal (Grand Royal Entertainment), produced by court financier Jean-Baptiste Colbert, celebrating the peace from the Treaty of Aachen. Without the ballet and music, the comedy appeared to the Paris public at the theatre of the Palais-Royal beginning on 9 November 1668.

Court historian André Félibien summarized the play in the official brochure (1668) this way: "The subject is that a wealthy peasant, who has married the daughter of a country gentleman, receives nothing but contempt from his wife as well as his handsome father- and mother-in-law, who only accepted him as their son-in-law because of his possessions and wealth".

Contemporary scholar Roland Racevskis summarized it this way: "The action centers on the woes of [George Dandin], a wealthy peasant who has entered into a misalliance by marrying Angélique, the daughter of a pair of caricatural provincial nobles, Monsieur and Madame de Sotenville [the latter played in female cross-dress] ... Dandin must repeatedly endure the humiliation of recognizing the social superiority of the Sotenvilles and of apologizing to the wife who is cuckolding him all the while."

Concerning Dandin's pretensions as a nouveau-riche gentleman, specifically his costume (as played by the playwright, Molière), described in the company's inventory by M.E. Soulie: "Breeches and cloak of light brown taffeta, with collar of the same; the whole adorned with lace and silver buttons, a belt of the same; a little doublet of crimson silk; another doublet of brocade of different colors and silver lace, to wear over it; and a large ruff and shoes." About it, Roger Chartier wrote, "Such a costume, which has nothing peasant about it, could immediately be recognized as an outrageous, forced, old-fashioned imitation of the aristocratic outfit." (Chartier 1994, p. 302)

== Characters and original cast ==
- Georges Dandin (George Dandin), husband of Angelica: Molière
- Angelica (Angélique), Georges Dandin's wife: Mlle Armande Béjart Molière
- Sir Sotenville (Monsieur de Sotenville), Angelica's father: Du Croisy
- Mrs Sotenville (Madame de Sotenville), Sir Sotenville's wife: Louis Béjart, later André Hubert (both cross-dress males)
- Clitandre (Clitandre), charming gallant, in love with Angelica: La Grange
- Claudine, Angelica's servant: Mlle de Brie
- Lubin, Clitander's servant: La Thorillière
- Colin, Dandin's servant
