= Edmé Boursault =

French dramatist (1638–1701)

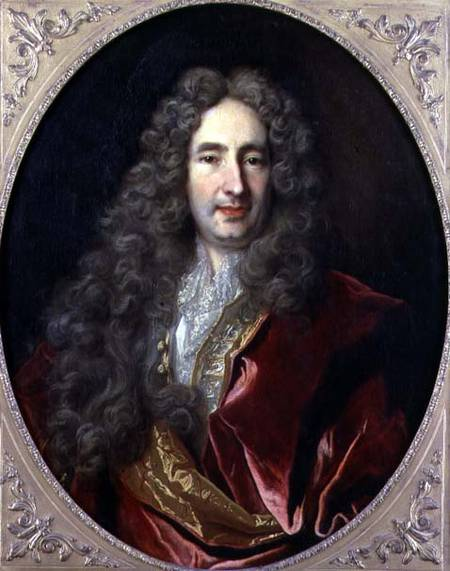
Edmé Boursault

Edmé Boursault (October 1638 – 15 September 1701) was a French dramatist and miscellaneous writer from the era of Louis XIV. He is known for his innovative theatrical trends, polemical writing, epistolary novels, and friendships with other writers such as Pierre Corneille.

== Biography ==
Boursault was born at Mussy l'Evéque in the Province of Champagne, now Mussy-sur-Seine (Aube). On Boursault's first arrival in Paris in 1651 his language was limited to Burgundian, but within a year he had produced his first comedy, Le Mort vivant (Living Death).

This and some other pieces of small merit secured for him distinguished patronage in the society ridiculed by Molière in the Ecole des femmes. Boursault was persuaded that the Lysidas of that play was a caricature of himself, and attacked Molière in Le Portrait du peintre ou la contre-critique de l'Ecole des femmes (1663). Molière retaliated in L'Impromptu de Versailles, and Boileau attacked Boursault in Satires 7 and 9. Boursault replied to Boileau in his Satire des satires (1669), but was afterwards reconciled to him, when Boileau on his side erased his name from his satires.

Boursault obtained a considerable pension as editor of a rhyming gazette, which was, however, suppressed for ridiculing a Capuchin friar, and the editor was only saved from the Bastille by the interposition of Condé. In 1671 he produced a work of edification in Ad usum Delphini: la veritable étude des souverains, which so pleased the court that its author was about to be made assistant tutor to Louis, Grand Dauphin when it was found that he was ignorant of Greek and Latin. The post then went to Pierre Huet, but perhaps in compensation, Boursault was made collector of taxes at Montluçon about 1672, an appointment that he retained until 1688.

Among his best-known plays are Le Mercure galant, the title of which was changed to La Comédie sans titre ("Play without a title", 1683) when the publisher of a literary review of the same name objected (see "Mercure de France"); La Princesse de Clêves (1676), an unsuccessful play which, when refurbished with fresh names by its author, succeeded as Germanicus; Esope à la ville (1690); and Esope à la cour (1701). His lack of dramatic instinct could hardly be better indicated than by the scheme of his Esope, which allows the fabulist to come on the stage in each scene and recite a fable.

Boursault died in Paris on 15 September 1701. His Œuvres choisies were published in 1811, and a sketch of him can be found in Saint-René Taillandier's Etudes littéraires (1881).

== Partial list of works ==
=== Drama ===
- Le Mort Vivant (English:The Living Dead Man, 1662). A three-act comedy.
- Portrait of the Painter, or Criticisms of the School for Women Criticized (French: Le Portrait du Peintre ou La Contre-critique de L’École des femmes, September 1663). Part of an ongoing literary quarrel over The School for Wives (1662) by Molière. The original play had caricatured "male-dominated exploitative marital relationships", and became a target of criticism. Criticisms ranged from accusing the playwright of impiety, to nitpicking over the perceived lack of realism in certain scenes. Molière had answered his critics with a second play, The School for Women Criticized (French: La Critique de L’École des femmes, June 1663). Boursault wrote his play in answer to this second play. In The School for Women Criticized, Molière poked fun at his critics by having their arguments expressed on stage by comical fools. While the character defending the original play, a mouthpiece for the writer, is a straight man with serious and thoughtful replies. In his Portrait, Boursault imitates the structure of Molière's play but subjects the characters to a role reversal. In other words, the critics of Molière are featured as serious and his defenders as fools. There is some question on the motivations of Boursault in getting involved in the quarrel. The character Lysidas, with which he took offense, may not have represented Boursault himself but his mentor Thomas Corneille. The play in its extant published form may differ considerably from its original staged version. The vulgar Chanson de la Coquille (Song of the Shell), which targeted Madeleine Béjart for her age and sexual history, seems to have been first used in the stage version of the Portrait and then re-used by Jean Donneau de Visé. Boursault probably included other malicious and personal attacks on Molière and his associates in the stage version, which were edited out in time for publication. The modern scholar can only guess at their nature by Molière's haste to respond. Molière answered with a third play of his own, The Versailles Impromptu (French: L'Impromptu de Versailles, October 1663), which reportedly took him only eight days to write. It went on stage two weeks (or less) after the Portrait. This play takes place in the theatrical world, featuring actors playing actors on stage. Among jests aimed at various targets, Molière mocks Boursault for his obscurity. The characters have trouble even remembering the name of someone called "Brossaut". Molière further taunts the upstart as "a publicity-seeking hack".
- Les Cadenats, ou le Jaloux Endormi (English: The locks, or the jealous one asleep, 1663). A one-act comedy. A theatrical work involving a "girdle of chastity" (chastity belt). Eric Dingwall considered it "in places both dull and tedious".
- Les Nicandres, ou Les Menteurs qui ne mentent point (English: The Nicandres, or The Liars who do not lie, 1664). A comedy. A play about two identical twin brothers, who also use the same name: "Nicandre" (Nicander). There are constant confusions over their identities, and "ludicrous mistakes and misunderstandings" result from the fact that their own mistresses and valets can not tell them apart. The plot and its humor are similar, though not identical, to Menaechmi by Plautus. John Colin Dunlop lists it among several French imitations of the ancient play, noting that the earliest among them was a 1630s version by Jean Rotrou.
- The Flying Doctor (French:Le médecin volant, 1664). This work went on stage in October 1664, and received its first publication in 1665. Boursault claimed to have translated this work from an Italian original. Molière also staged, but did not publish, an identical-named play in 1664. A number of scholars have theorized that Boursault was directly influenced by Molière's version. Comparisons of the two plays have revealed near-identical plots, but also substantial differences. These range from the names and occupations of various characters to different takes on certain scenes. A number of phrases used in both plays seem to point to a common source for both works. Some scenes seem more developed in Boursault's version, possibly because of his attempt to closely follow the Italian original. His personal touches are evident in other ways. His characters speak in verse, and the dialogue at times includes allusions to the works of French dramatists. For example, to Polyeucte (1643) by Pierre Corneille, La Belle plaideuse (1655) by François le Métel de Boisrobert, and possibly Les Précieuses ridicules (1659) by Molière. While both identical-named plays feature an impostor doctor, Boursault also adds a real one as an object or satire and ridicule. There is some confusion over the reception of the work. There are references to Le médecin volant receiving a Dutch translation in 1666, entering the repertory of provincial theaters in 1668, and being regularly staged by the Comédie-Française from 1685 to 1687. But the primary sources rarely make the distinction between the two plays, so whether it was Molière's or Boursault's version who had enduring success is uncertain.
- Les Yeux de Philis changés en astres (English:Metamorphosis of Phyllis' eyes into stars, 1665). A pastoral drama, in three-acts. It was first staged by the Troupe royale in the Hôtel de Bourgogne. It was based on the 1639 poem of the same name by Germain Habert. The original poem was rather short at c. 600 lines, depicting the love story of Daphnis and Phyllis. Boursault initially planned to dramatize all its verses, and to add short scenes connecting the major ones to each other. Realizing that the play lacked in action, Boursault added more characters and subplots. He retained the basic three characters of the original: Daphnis, Phyllis, and Helios/Sol (French:Soleil for Sun). He then created a secondary couple in the persons of Lisis, brother to Phyllis, and Carite, sister to Daphnis. A major departure from the original was the intervention of the gods. The action takes place in the island of Delos and the Sun is identified with Apollo. He too loves Phillis and his love is rejected. He first asks his sister Artemis/Diana to intervene on his behalf, to little effect. But the new couple has to drink from a certain spring for their nuptials, and Hermes/Mercury assists Apollo by poisoning it. Daphnis is fatally poisoned and Phyllis weeps. Eros/Cupid and Hymen then jointly plead to Zeus/Jupiter for justice. He is sufficiently moved to carry off Phillis to the heavens, where she and Daphnis can re-unite. The eyes of the young woman turn into the twin stars of Gemini. Boursault reported that he chose to limit the play to three acts, because in his observation four-act and five-act plays tend to fatigue the audience. The entire plot takes place in less than 24 hours, leaving little room for further intrigue or character study. "The verse is polished and correct, but conventional and monotonous". Certain scenes call for spectacular effects, such as the heavens opening and gods appearing to dictate their wishes, sounds of thunder, and the earth itself trembling. Others scenes rely on music and singing. Boursault likely counted on these scenes to be the highlights of the work.
- The Satire of Satires (French: La satire des satires, 1668/1669). A one-act play, written in response to criticisms by Nicolas Boileau-Despréaux. In his Satire VII, Boileau had included Boursault in a list of bad poets. A list which included several obscure figures and possible made-up names. (For example, "Titreville" is mentioned only in Satire VII and Satire IX. There is no other source on his existence.) Since Boileau had briefly targeted Boursault in his satires, Boursault evidently wanted to respond in kind. Boileau managed to prevent the staging of this play by an act of parlement. Years later, the two writers befriended each other. In response, Boileau edited the text of his satire to instead target Jacques Pradon. This altered version survived in subsequent editions of his work. The incident sheds some light on the legal limitations of theatrical satire at the time. The decision of parlement (dated to 22 October 1668) objected to the use of the proper name of Boileau, proclaiming that the practice was "defamatory of the honor" of the suppliant and therefore illegal. Larry Norman also points that direct satire was a controversial literary topic at the time. François Hédelin, abbé d'Aubignac criticized Old Comedy, mainly represented by Aristophanes, for mixing his narrative with public affairs. Boileau himself would later comment on the vices of Old Comedy which turned Socrates to a laughingstock for the "vile masses" of Athens. This sympathy for Socrates might have been connected to his own treatment at the pen of Boursault.
- Germanicus (1673). A tragedy, based on Ancient Rome. The titular character is Germanicus, nephew of Tiberius. The other featured characters include (1)Drusus Julius Caesar, son of Tiberius, (2)Agrippina the Elder, daughter to Marcus Vipsanius Agrippa and granddaughter of Augustus, (3)Livilla, sister of Germanicus, (4) Pison, a Roman chevalier (member of the Roman equestrian order). Possibly named after the Piso family, (5)Flavia, a confidant to Agripinna, (6)Albinus, a confidant to Germanicus, and (7)Flavian, a confidant to Pison. While successful at the time of its release, the tragedy went on to gain a reputation as an "indifferent work". Its main claim to fame has to do with indirectly causing a quarrel between two other writers. While congratulating Boursault for his play, Pierre Corneille commented that it only needed the signature of Jean Racine "to be deemed a great work". The comparison between Boursault and Racine pleased the former and infuriated the latter. Resulting in a verbal fight between Corneille and Racine. The two opponents were not on speaking terms afterwards.
- La Princesse de Clèves (English: The Princess of Clèves, December 1678). It was written for the Guénégaud Theatre, and proved a flop. Only two performances were staged. It was obviously based on the novel of the same name (1678) by Madame de La Fayette. The play is a lost work, and there are some doubts on its existence. The main source about it seems to be a 1697 letter from the correspondence of an aging Boursault. He claimed to have reused part of its material for Germanicus. But there are records of Germanicus being staged in 1673, five years before the original novel appeared. There are also marked differences between the theme and plot of the two works.
- Le Mercure galant or La Comédie sans titre ("Play without a title") (1683). A theatrical comedy, and a comedy of manners. Monsieur de Boishuisant is an admirer of the eponymous periodical Mercure galant. Protagonist Oronte aspires to marry the daughter of the Monsieur and happens to be a friend of the editor. He gets permission to act as editor for a day to impress his prospective father-in-law. The play takes place in the offices of the periodical, and includes 13 vignettes where typical members of Parisian society present various requests to Oronte. Jean Donneau de Visé, the real-life founder of the periodical, attempted to stop production of the play. His efforts resulted in a change in title, though the play was not actually an attack on the periodical. Its depiction on stage serves as a testament to its popularity, and influence. Boursault reserves his satire for the well-born poetasters, who used their influence to get their works published alongside the better material of Le Mercure galant. The loosely connected scenes make this a work of social satire. There was little originality in the types depicted, which like a revue took its inspiration from contemporary figures and incidents. The people asking the support of the editor include an upwardly mobile bourgeois. He seeks to acquire a noble title, which would allow him to marry a young marquise. Another petitioner is a tax collector who has embezzled tax money, and wants the periodical to champion the cause of clearing his name. An old seaman wants to sell his life story to the periodical, certain that it will sell well among former veterans. He is a veteran of the Battle of Augusta (1676) and claims to be personally responsible for the death of enemy admiral Michiel de Ruyter. His actual claim to fame is that he provided the match which fired the cannon responsible for the deed.
- Marie Stuart (Mary Stuart, 1683). A tragedy. Based on the life of the ill-fated Mary, Queen of Scots. An unsuccessful work, though profitable for the writer. Boursault dedicated the work to François de Beauvilliers, 1st duc de Saint-Aignan. The Duc was sufficiently pleased to pay him a sum of 100 louis. This play was an entry to a long string of epic poems and dramas on the subject, mostly produced in France and Spain. Previous writers which had covered this popular subject were Antoine de Montchrestien (his version was written in 1596, and published in 1601), Tommaso Campanella (1598), Lope de Vega (1627), Charles Regnault (1639), Juan Bautista Diamante (1660), and Manuel de Gallegos (1660). Subsequent ones would include Vittorio Alfieri (1788), Friedrich Schiller (1800), and Gaetano Donizetti (1834).
- Les Fables d'Ésope, comédie or Ésope à la Ville (English: Aesop's Fables or Aesop in the City, 1690). A moralistic play, where Aesop responds to any question and difficulty by reciting a relevant fable. The "superhuman wisdom and virtue" of the character were derided by later critics, who tended to find the traits wearisome. The initial production was not without its problems. The theatrical company which staged the play insisted on excluding a certain scene of the second act, while Boursault insisted on its inclusion. He only prevailed on the argument by convincing a valet de chambre to intervene on his behalf. On the opening performance, the initial audience reception was hostile. The play consisted of the main character narrating familiar tales, against their expectations. Jean Baptist Raisin, the lead actor, then interrupted the performance to explain why it was necessary. He explained that Aesop reciting his fables preserved the very essence of his character. His speech was met with applause and requests for the performance to continue. The play became a profitable hit. It was translated and revised for the English stage by John Vanbrugh, debuting under the title Aesop: a Comedy (January 1697). Vanbrugh abandoned the stylish rhyming couplets of Boursault, revising them to a "racier prose-with-songs". His Aesop was more naturalistic than his French counterpart, and spoke in a vernacular form of English. This version of Boursault's work was regularly performed at Theatre Royal, Drury Lane to 1720. The work served at familiarizing Aesop to a wide English audience. Already in 1698, it inspired various pamphlets with titles such as Aesop at Epsom, Old Aesop at White-Hall, etc. In content they ranged from political commentary to scandal sheets.
- La Feste de la Seine (English: The feast of the Seine, 1690). A one-act divertissement, set to music.
- Phaeton (1691). A comedy. Based on Classical mythology, the main character is Phaëton, son of Helios/Sol (French:Soleil for Sun) and Clymene. The other featured characters include (1)Cephise (French for Cephissus), daughter of Merops, King of Egypt, (2) Clymene, mother of Phaëton and wife of Merops, (3) Epaphus, son of Zeus/Jupiter and Isis/Io, (4) Proteus, demigod and guardian to the herds of Poseidon/Neptune, (5)Theone, daughter of Proteus, (6)Nicaea, confidant to Theone, (7) Helios/Sol/La Soleil/The Sun, (8) Momus, (9) the first Hour of the day, (10) The Hour at which the Ladies go to the Temple, (11) a personified Moment, (12) Gaia/Terra (French:La Terre for Earth), (13) Zeus/Jupiter, and (14)the guards of Clymene. The main setting is Memphis.
- Fashionable Words (French: Les Mots à la mode, 1694). A comedy spoofing the fashion fads of the time and their associated terminology. Scenes are devoted to listing the many names for variants of the fontange hairstyle. The long list includes names such as "bourgogne" (Burgundy), "jardiniere" (gardener), "souris" (mouse), "effrontée" (shameless), and "crève-cœur" (heartbreaker).
- Meleager (French: Méléagre, 1694). A tragedy, unperformed. Based on the legendary hunt for the Calydonian Boar. The play takes place in Calydon, a city in Aetolia. The main characters are (1) Meleager, son of Oeneus and Althaea, and his lover (2) Atalanta, daughter of Iasus.
- Ésope à la Cour (English: Aesop at the Court, 1701). Sequel to the previous work, first performed shortly after the death of the writer. A number of characters and situations point to its social context at the dawn of the 18th-century. Croesus appoints Aesop as his Minister of State, and the newly appointed man delivers a speech condemning the vices of the royal court: dishonesty, hypocrisy, deception, flattery, love of gambling, and dissipation. The target is evidently not the court of Croesus, but that of Louis XIV. Another scene has Aesop debating religion with Iphicrates, a retired general who doubts the very existence of God. Iphicrates is a representative of freethought, though Aesop reminds him that free-thinkers still send for priests when at death's door. Another target for criticism was relatively new for French comedy, "M. Griffet" the fermier (tax farmer). Jean de La Bruyère had already targeted these tax contractors at his works. But Boursault's take on the subject serves as a precursor to Turcaret (1709) by Alain-René Lesage.

=== Novels ===
- Lettres de respect, d'obligation et d'amour (English:Letters of Respect, Gratitude and Love, 1669). An early epistolary novel.
- Artémise et Poliante (English: Artemisia and Polyanthus, 1670).
- Le Marquis de Chavigny (English:The marquis de Chavigny, 1670).
- Ne pas croire ce qu'on voit (English: We should only believe what we see, 1670) One of several contemporary works based on "Spanish plots", in this case deriving from the works of Pedro Calderón de la Barca.
- Le Prince de Condé (English: The prince de Condé, 1675).
- Lettres à Babet (English: Letters to Babet, 1683). An epistolary novel.
- "Sept Lettres amoureuses d'une dame à un cavalier" in Lettres nouvelles (1697). An epistolary novel translated by Eliza Haywood as Letters from a Lady of Quality to a Chevalier (1720)
- Treize Lettres amoureuses d'une dame à un cavalier (1709).

== Sources ==
- Adrian, John (2007), Taylor Bourdeau, Debra; Kraft, Elizabeth (eds.), On Second Thought: Updating the Eighteenth-century Text, University of Delaware Press, ISBN 978-0874139754
- Becker, Colette (2000), La Roman, Editions Bréal, ISBN 978-2749521213
- Boursault, Edmé (1746), Théatre de feu Monsieur Boursault, Vol. I, Par la Compagnie des libraires
- Boursault, Edmé (1746), Théatre de feu Monsieur Boursault, Vol. II, Par la Compagnie des libraires
- Boursault, Edmé (1746), Théatre de feu Monsieur Boursault, Vol III, Par la Compagnie des libraires
- Brereton, Geoffrey (1977), French Comic Drama: From the Sixteenth to the Eighteenth Century, Taylor & Francis, ISBN 978-0416807103
- Chalmers, Alexander (1812), The General Biographical Dictionary, Vol. VI, J. Nichols
- DeJean, Joan (2007), The Essence of Style: How the French Invented High Fashion, Fine Food, Chic Cafes, Style, Sophistication, and Glamour, Simon & Schuster, ISBN 978-1416588535
- Dingwall, Eric John (1931), The girdle of chastity: a medico-historical study, G. Routledge & Sons
- Dunlop, John Colin (1823), History of Roman Literature : From its̓ earliest period to the Augustan age, Longman, Hurst, Rees, Orme, Brown, and Green
- Finson, Jon W. (2011), Kok, Roe-Min; Tunbridge, Laura (eds.), Rethinking Schumann, Oxford University Press, ISBN 978-0199813308
- Forman, Edward (2010), Historical Dictionary of French Theater, Scarecrow Press, ISBN 978-0810874510
- Fournel, Victor (1863), Les contemporains de Molière, Vol. 1, Firmin Didot frères, fils et cie
- Gaines, James F. (2002), The Molière encyclopedia, Greenwood Publishing Group, ISBN 978-0313312557
- Garreau, Joseph E. (1984), Hochman, Stanley (ed.), McGraw-Hill Encyclopedia of World Drama: An International Reference Work in 5 Volumes, Vol. 1, VNR AG, ISBN 978-0070791695
- Hawkins, Frederick William (1884), Annals of the French stage, from its origin to the death of Racine, Vol. II, Haskell House Publishers LTD
- Lancaster, Henry Carrington (1936), A History of French Dramatic Literature in the Seventeenth Century, Part III: The period of Molière, 1652–1672, Vol II, The Johns Hopkins Press
- Loveridge, Mark (1998), A History of Augustan Fable, Cambridge University Press, ISBN 978-0521630627
- Norman, Larry F. (2010), The Public Mirror: Moliere and the Social Commerce of Depiction, University of Chicago Press, ISBN 978-0226591537
- Pocock, Gordon (1980), Boileau and the Nature of Neoclassicism, Cambridge University Press, ISBN 978-0521227728
- Reid, Jane Davidson; Rohmann, Chris (1993), he Oxford guide to classical mythology in the arts, 1300-1990s, Oxford University Press, ISBN 978-0195049985
- Scott, J.W. (1973). "Review of Madame de La Fayette by Stirling Haig". French Studies. XXVII (27) (2). Oxford Journals: 199–200. doi:10.1093/fs/XXVII.2.199.
- Scott, Virginia (2002), Molière: A Theatrical Life, Cambridge University Press, ISBN 978-0521012386
- Shelley, Mary Wollstonecraft (1840), Lives of the most Eminent Literary and Scientific Men of France, Vol. I, Lea and Blanchard
- Slater, Maya (2008), The Misanthrope, Tartuffe, and Other Plays, Oxford University Press, ISBN 978-0191623158
- Sullivan, Henry W. (2009), Calderón in the German Lands and the Low Countries: His Reception and Influence, 1654–1980, Cambridge University Press, ISBN 978-0521121606
- Tilley, Arthur Augustus (1929), The Decline of the Age of Louis XIV: Or, French Literature 1687–1715, CUP Archive
- Visconti, Laura (1994), Eriksen, Roy (ed.), Contexts of Pre-novel Narrative: The European Tradition, Walter de Gruyter, ISBN 978-3110138832
- Weil, Michèle (1991), Robert Challe: romancier, Librairie Droz, ISBN 978-2600036788
- Wolfgang, Aurora (2004), Gender and Voice in the French Novel, 1730–1782, Ashgate, ISBN 978-0754637028
