= Tartuffe =

1664 play by Molière

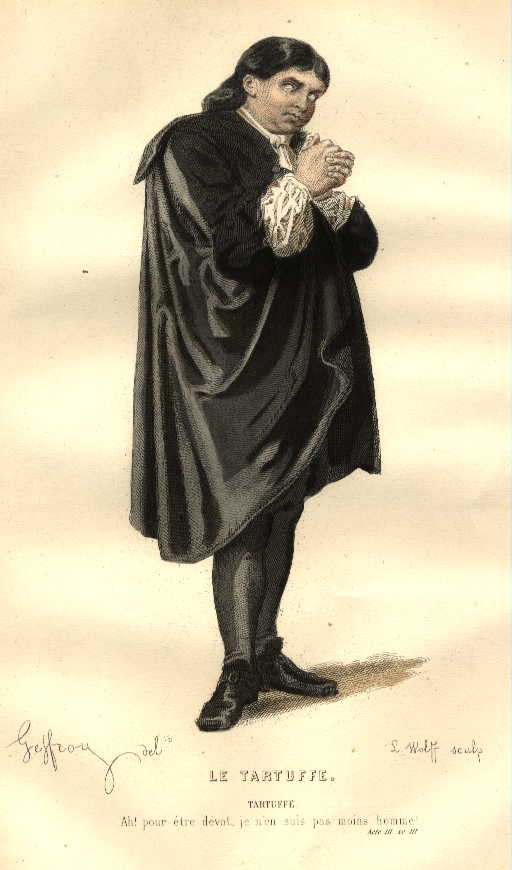
- 19th-century costume design
- Original language: French
- Written by: Molière
- Genre: Comedy
- Setting: Orgon's house in Paris, 1660s

Premiere
- Date: 1664

Tartuffe, or The Impostor, or The Hypocrite (/tɑːrˈtʊf, -ˈtuːf/; French: Tartuffe, ou l'Imposteur, pronounced [taʁtyf u lɛ̃pɔstœʁ]), first performed in 1664, is a theatrical comedy and farce by Molière, written in poetic verse.

The play was first performed in 1664 in three acts, but the text of it has been lost after it was condemned by the Archbishop of Paris, Hardouin de Péréfixe de Beaumont. The play was revised in 1667 to be less provocative, and eventually re-released in its current form in 1669.

== History ==
Molière performed his first version of Tartuffe in 1664. Almost immediately following its performance that same year at Versailles' grandes fêtes (The Party of the Delights of the Enchanted Island/Les fêtes des plaisirs de l'ile enchantée), King Louis XIV suppressed it, probably under the influence of the archbishop of Paris, Paul Philippe Hardouin de Beaumont de Péréfixe, the King's confessor and former tutor. While the king had little personal interest in suppressing the play, he did so because, as stated in the official account of the fête:

although it was found to be extremely diverting, the king recognized so much conformity between those that a true devotion leads on the path to heaven and those that a vain ostentation of some good works does not prevent from committing some bad ones, that his extreme delicacy to religious matters can not suffer this resemblance of vice to virtue, which could be mistaken for each other; although one does not doubt the good intentions of the author, even so he forbids it in public, and deprived himself of this pleasure, in order not to allow it to be abused by others, less capable of making a just discernment of it.

As a result of Molière's play, contemporary French and English both use the word "tartuffe" to designate a hypocrite who intentionally and exaggeratedly feigns virtue, especially religious virtue. The play is written entirely in twelve-syllable lines (alexandrines) of rhyming couplets—1,962 lines total.

== Characters ==
Character	Description
Orgon: Molière	Head of the house and husband of Elmire, he is blinded by admiration for Tartuffe.
Tartuffe: Du Croisy	Houseguest of Orgon, hypocritical religious devotee who attempts to seduce Elmire
Valère: La Grange	The young romantic lead, who struggles to win the hand of his true love, Orgon's daughter Mariane.
Madame Pernelle: Louis Béjart, cross-dressed	Mother of Orgon; grandmother of Damis and Mariane
Elmire: Armande Béjart-Molière	Wife of Orgon, step-mother of Damis and Mariane
Dorine: Madeleine Béjart	Family housemaid (suivante), who tries to help expose Tartuffe and help Valère and Mariane.
Cléante: La Thorillière	Brother of Elmire, brother-in-law of Orgon (the play's raisonneur)
Mariane: Mlle de Brie	Daughter of Orgon, the fiancée of Valère and sister of Damis
Damis: André Hubert	Son of Orgon and brother of Mariane
Laurent	Servant of Tartuffe (non-speaking character)
Argas	Friend of Orgon who was anti-Louis XIV during the Fronde (mentioned but not seen).
Flipote	Servant of Madame Pernelle (non-speaking character)
Monsieur Loyal: Mr. De Brie	A bailiff
A King's Officer/The Exempt	An officer of the king

== Plot ==
Act 3, Scene 6 of Tartuffe: Tartuffe (kneeling) falsely feigns penitence and tricks Orgon (left) into disinheriting his son Damais (right)

Orgon's family is up in arms because Orgon and his mother, Madame Pernelle, have fallen under the influence of Tartuffe, a fraud and vagrant prior to Orgon's charity. Tartuffe manipulates Orgon by aping devotion and pretending to speak with divine authority. Madame Pernelle, also convinced of Tartuffe's piety, denounces Elmire and Cléante, Orgon's second wife and brother-in-law, respectively.

Orgon returns from his estate with news: although his daughter Mariane is engaged to Valère, Tartuffe will now marry his daughter. The news causes a rift between Mariane and Valère as each is convinced of the other's apathy until Dorine, the maid, reconciles the couple and plots to reveal Tartuffe's hypocrisy. Suspecting that Tartuffe will be swayed by Elmire, she arranges for the two to meet. Unbeknownst to her, Damis, Orgon's son and heir, eavesdrops on their conversation. When Tartuffe declares his love for Elmire, Damis interrupts and triumphantly reports everything to his father. However, Tartuffe uses reverse psychology to accuse himself of being the worst sinner:

Oui, mon frère, je suis un méchant, un coupable.
Un malheureux pécheur tout plein d'iniquité
Yes, my brother, I am wicked, guilty.
A miserable sinner just full of iniquity.

Orgon is convinced that Damis is lying and banishes him from the house. He signs over all his worldly possessions to Tartuffe, disinheriting Damis. After seeing that Orgon will listen to neither reason nor emotion after interviews with Cléante and Mariane, Elmire decides to act. She challenges Orgon to eavesdrop on a private meeting between her and Tartuffe. Orgon, convinced of Tartuffe's piety, agrees and hides under a table. Elmire's attempts to seduce Tartuffe make him suspicious, but his lust soon offers Orgon indisputable proof of his hypocrisy. Orgon demands that Tartuffe leave his household, but Tartuffe reminds him that he is its owner as he threatens to return.

Orgon despondently reveals to his family that, before the events of the play, he had admitted to Tartuffe that he had kept letters written by his friend, Argas, that denounced Louis XIV. The box is nowhere to be found. Soon after, a bailiff, Monsieur Loyal, arrives with a message from Tartuffe: Orgon and his family must vacate the house. Dorine mocks Loyal's name and his false loyalty. As he leaves, Valère enters, warning Orgon that Tartuffe has just revealed the treasonous letters to the King and that an officer is on his way to the house with a warrant for Orgon's arrest.

Before Orgon can flee, however, Tartuffe arrives with the officer, but to his surprise, the officer arrests him instead. The officer explains that the enlightened King Louis XIV—who is not mentioned by name—has heard of the injustices happening in the house and, appalled by Tartuffe's treachery toward Orgon, has ordered Tartuffe's arrest instead. The officer explains that Tartuffe has a long criminal history and has often changed his name to avoid being caught. As a reward for Orgon's previous good services, the King not only forgives him for keeping the letters but also invalidates the deed that gave Tartuffe possession of Orgon's house and possessions.

The entire family is thankful that it has escaped the mortification of both Orgon's potential disgrace and their dispossession. As a thanks for Valère's loyalty, Orgon consents for him to marry Mariane. The surprise twist ending, in which everything is set right by the unexpected benevolent intervention of the heretofore unseen King, is considered a notable modern-day example of the classical theatrical plot device deus ex machina.

== Controversy ==
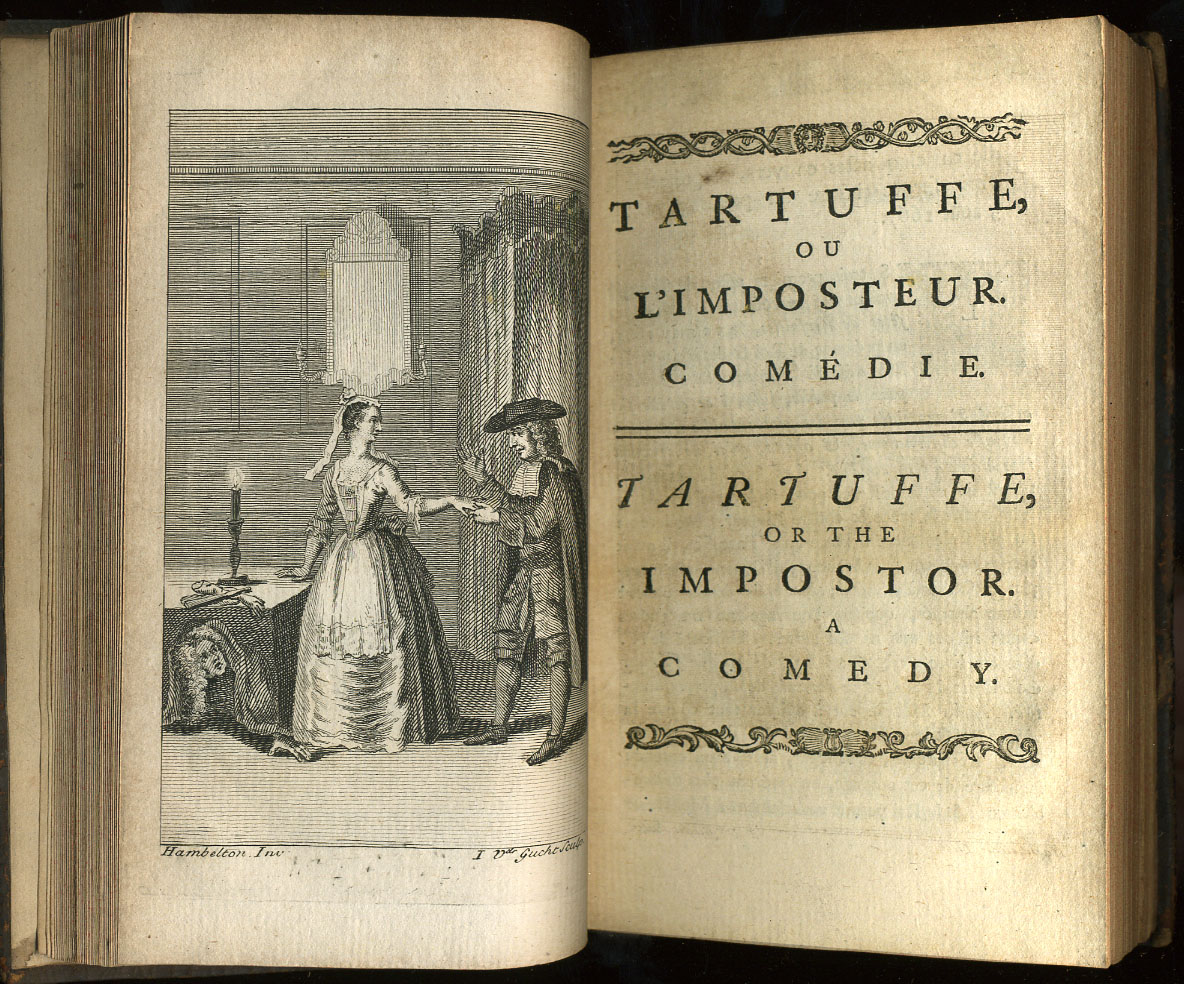
Frontispiece and title page of Tartuffe or The Imposter from a 1739 collected edition of Molière's works in French and English, printed by John Watts. The engraving depicts the amoral Tartuffe being deceitfully seduced by Elmire, the wife of his host, Orgon who hides under a table.

Though Tartuffe was received well by the public and even by Louis XIV, it immediately sparked conflict among many different groups who were offended by the play's portrayal of someone who was outwardly pious but fundamentally mercenary, lecherous, and deceitful; and who uses a profession of piety to prey on others. The factions opposed to Molière's work included part of the hierarchy of the Catholic Church, members of upper-class French society, and the Compagnie du Saint-Sacrement, a Catholic underground organization. Tartuffe's popularity was cut short when the archbishop of Paris Péréfixe issued an edict threatening excommunication for anyone who watched, performed in, or read the play. Molière attempted to assuage church officials by rewriting his play to seem more secular and less critical of religion, but the archbishop and other leading officials would not budge. The revised, second version of the play was called L'Imposteur and had a main character named Panulphe instead of Tartuffe, the only performance of which occurred in the Palais-Royal theatre on 5 August 1667. Immediately the following day, on 6 August, as the king was away from Paris, Guillaume de Lamoignon, first president of the Paris Parlement, censored public performances.

Even throughout Molière's conflict with the church, Louis XIV continued to support the playwright; it is possible that without the King's support, Molière might have been excommunicated. Although public performances of the play were banned, private performances for the French aristocracy did occur. In 1669, after Molière's detractors lost much of their influence, he was finally allowed to perform the final version of his play. However, due to all the controversy surrounding Tartuffe, Molière mostly refrained from writing such incisive plays as this one again.

An ally of Molière (believed by Robert McBride to be François de La Mothe Le Vayer, but a hotly-debated point) responded to criticism of Tartuffe in 1667 with a Lettre sur la comédie de l'Imposteur. The anonymous author sought to defend the play (Note: the 2nd version, before the largely-finished 3rd version in 1669) to the public by describing the plot in detail and then rebutting two common arguments made for why the play was banned. The first being that theatrical works should not discuss religion at all; the second being that Tartuffe's actions on stage, followed by his pious speech, would make the audience think that they were to act as Tartuffe did. This section of letter contradicts the latter by describing how Tartuffe's actions are worthy of ridicule, in essence comic, and therefore by no means an endorsement.

The comic is the outward and visible form that nature's bounty has attached to everything unreasonable, so that we should see, and avoid it. To know the comic we must know the rational, of which it denotes the absence and we must see wherein the rational consists ... incongruity is the heart of the comic ... it follows that all lying, disguise, cheating, dissimulation, all outward show different from the reality, all contradiction in fact between actions that proceed from a single source, all this is in essence comic.

Centuries later, when the satirical anticlerical magazine La Calotte started publication in 1906, its first editorial asserted that Laughter is the only weapon feared by the soldiers of Tartuffe; the new magazine proposed to effectively deploy that weapon, with articles and cartoons mercilessly lampooning the Catholic Church and its clergy.

== Production history ==
The original version of the play was in three acts and was first staged on 12 May 1664 at the Palace of Versailles' Cour de Marbre as part of festivities known as Les Plaisirs de l'île enchantée. Because of the attacks on the play and the ban that was placed on it, this version was never published, and no text has survived, giving rise to much speculation as to whether it was a work in progress or a finished piece. Many writers believe it consisted of the first three acts of the final version, while John Cairncross has proposed that acts 1, 3, and 4 were performed. Although the original version could not be played publicly, it could be given privately, and it was seen on 25 September 1664 in Villers-Cotterêts, for Louis' brother Philippe I, Duke of Orléans, aka Monsieur and 29 November 1664 at the Château du Raincy, for the veteran of the Fronde, Armand de Bourbon, Prince of Conti.

The second version, L'Imposteur, was in five acts and performed only once, on 5 August 1667 in the Théâtre du Palais-Royal. On 11 August, before any additional performances, the Archbishop of Paris Péréfixe banned this version also. The largely-final, revised third version in five acts, under the title Tartuffe, ou L'Imposteur, appeared on 5 February 1669 at the Palais-Royal theatre and was highly successful. This version was published and is the one that is generally performed today.

=== Modern productions ===
Since Molière's time, Tartuffe has stayed on the repertoire of the Comédie-Française, where it is its most performed play.

The Russian theatre practitioner Constantin Stanislavski was working on a production of Tartuffe when he died in 1938. It was completed by Mikhail Kedrov and opened on 4 December 1939.

The first Broadway production took place at the ANTA Washington Square Theatre in New York and ran from 14 January 1965 to 22 May 1965. The cast included Michael O'Sullivan as Tartuffe, Sada Thompson as Dorine, Salome Jens as Elmire, Hal Holbrook as M. Loyal, John Phillip Law as King's Officer, Laurence Luckinbill as Damis and Tony Lo Bianco as Sergeant.

The National Theatre Company performed a production in 1967 using the Richard Wilbur translation and featuring John Gielgud as Orgon, Robert Stephens as Tartuffe, Jeremy Brett as Valere, Derek Jacobi as The Officer and Joan Plowright as Dorine.

A production of Richard Wilbur's translation of the play opened at the Circle in the Square Theatre in 1977, with John Wood as Tartuffe, and co-starring Tammy Grimes as Elmire, Stefan Gierasch as Orgon, Ray Wise as Damis, Swoosie Kurtz as Mariane and Patricia Elliott as Dorine.

A Royal Shakespeare Company production using the Christopher Hampton translation and directed by Bill Alexander was performed at The Pit Theatre in London in 1983. The production included Antony Sher as Tartuffe, Nigel Hawthorne as Orgon, Mark Rylance as Damis, Alison Steadman as Elmire, Stephanie Fayerman as Dorine and David Bradley as Cleante.

Charles Randolph-Wright staged a production of Tartuffe, July 1999, at American Conservatory Theater in San Francisco, which was set among affluent African Americans of Durham, North Carolina, in the 1950s.

A translation by Ranjit Bolt was staged at London's Playhouse Theatre in 1991 with Abigail Cruttenden, Paul Eddington, Jamie Glover, Felicity Kendal, Nicholas Le Prevost, John Sessions and Toby Stephens. Bolt's translation was later staged at London's National Theatre in 2002 with Margaret Tyzack as Madame Pernelle, Martin Clunes as Tartuffe, Clare Holman as Elmire, Julian Wadham as Cleante and David Threlfall as Orgon.

David Ball adapted Tartuffe for the Theatre de la Jeune Lune in 2006 and Dominique Serrand revived this production in 2015 in a coproduction with Berkeley Repertory Theatre, South Coast Repertory and the Shakespeare Theatre Company.

Liverpudlian poet Roger McGough's translation premièred at the Liverpool Playhouse in May 2008 and transferred subsequently to the Rose Theatre, Kingston.

The Royal Shakespeare Company produced a new version by Anil Gupta and Richard Pinto which relocated the story to the modern-day Pakistani-Muslim community of Sparkhill, Birmingham. It premiered at the Swan Theatre, Stratford-upon-Avon in September 2018 before transferring to Birmingham Repertory Theatre in October 2022.

In 2021, Singapore theatre company W!ld Rice commissioned a new version by Singaporean playwright Joel Tan, which premiered in 2022. Tan's version adds a new plot twist: Valère's engagement to Mariane is a lavender marriage to cover up his torrid affair with Damis and her desire to become an independent woman.

In 2022, a feminist reimagining written by Flora Davies and Siân Lawrence was presented at Oxford's BT Studio by Green Sun Productions to great acclaim. This adaptation sets the action within a fictional feminist consultancy firm; Orgon and Elmire become Co-CEOs and Tartuffe a new hire in the office. The production transferred to the Edinburgh Fringe in August 2023.

In 2026, Mark Rylance starred in Tartuffe (Remixed). This is an adaptation that resets the play in a Nigerian-Jamaican household in modern England. The production was developed at the Marylebone Theatre, London and performed with the acting company of Intermission Youth Theatre, a charity for young actors, supported by Mark Rylance.

== Adaptations ==
=== Film ===
- The film Herr Tartüff was produced by Ufa in 1926. It was directed by F. W. Murnau and starred Emil Jannings as Tartuffe, Lil Dagover as Elmire and Werner Krauss as Orgon.
- Gérard Depardieu directed and starred in the title role of Le tartuffe, the 1984 French film version.
- The 2007 French film Molière contains many references, both direct and indirect, to Tartuffe, the most notable of which is that the character of Molière masquerades as a priest and calls himself "Tartuffe". The end of the film implies that Molière went on to write Tartuffe based on his experiences in the film.

=== Stage ===
- The National Theatre, England, adapted this for stage in 1967 at The Old Vic Theatre, London. Translated by Richard Wilbur, directed by Tyrone Guthrie and ran for 39 performances, closing in 1969.
- Tartuffe in Texas is set in Dallas, Texas; published in 2012 by Eldridge Publishing.
- Bell Shakespeare Company, Tartuffe - The Hypocrite translated from original French by Justin Fleming in 2014 and earlier for Melbourne Theatre Company in 2008, with uniquely varied rhyming verse forms.
- American Stage Theatre Company in St. Petersburg, Florida, adapted Tartuffe in 2016, staged in modern-day as a political satire, with Orgon, as a wealthy American businessman who entrusts his reputation and his fortune to up-and-coming politician, Tartuffe.
- It was adapted for an Australian audience in the "post-truth" age by playwright Philip Kavanagh, performed by the State Theatre Company of South Australia and Brink Productions, October–November 2016 in Adelaide.
- The Tobacco Factory Theatre set the play in 2017 London, with Tartuffe imagined as a business guru and Orgon as an old-school Tory politician. The script was translated with rhyming couplets by Andrew Hilton and Dominic Power.
- In 2022, a feminist reimagining written by Flora Davies and Siân Lawrence was presented at Oxford's BT Studio by Green Sun Productions to great acclaim. This adaptation sets the action within a fictional feminist consultancy firm; Orgon and Elmire become Co-CEOs and Tartuffe a new hire in the office. The production transferred to the Edinburgh Fringe in August 2023.
- In 2025, a new adaptation of the play by Lucas Hnath opened off-Broadway as a production of the New York Theatre Workshop. The cast includes Matthew Broderick as Tartuffe and David Cross as Orgon, and the production is directed by Sarah Benson. Another new adaptation of the play, starring André De Shields as Tartuffe, was announced on 4 September 2025. This version took place at the House of the Redeemer and began performances on 3 October.
- In 2026, the Marylebone Theatre staged "Tartuffe (Remixed)", an updated version by Darren Raymond of Intermission Youth Theatre. Set in a Nigerian-Jamaican household in modern England, the play featured Mark Rylance as Pastor Blake (Tartuffe), Usifu Jalloh as Oga (Orgon) and Nakeba Buchanan as Elmire.

=== Television ===
- Productions for French television were filmed in 1971, 1975, 1980, 1983 and 1998.
- On 28 November 1971, the BBC broadcast as part of their Play of the Month series a production directed by Basil Coleman using the Richard Wilbur translation and featuring Michael Hordern as Tartuffe, Mary Morris as Madame Pernelle and Patricia Routledge as Dorine.
- Donald Moffat starred in a 1978 videotaped PBS television production with Stefan Gierasch as Orgon, Tammy Grimes as Elmire, Ray Wise as Damis, Victor Garber as Valère and Geraldine Fitzgerald as Madame Pernelle. The translation was by Richard Wilbur and the production was directed by Kirk Browning. Taped in a television studio without an audience, this production was based on at the 1977 Circle in the Square Theatre production (see Modern Productions above), but with a slightly different cast – John Wood played Tartuffe in the Broadway version, and Madame Pernelle was played by Mildred Dunnock in that same production.
- The BBC adapted the Bill Alexander production for the Royal Shakespeare Company. This television version was first screened in the UK during November 1985 in the Theatre Night series with most of the original cast, including Antony Sher, Nigel Hawthorne, Stephanie Fayerman and Alison Steadman, reprising their stage roles (see "Modern Productions" above) (Lesley Sharp replaced Katy Behean as Mariane and Michael Maloney replaced Mark Rylance as Damis). While this television version does derive from the RSC's 1983 stage production, IMDb is inaccurate in dating this videotaped version from that year. The BFI Film & TV Database indicates the start date for this programme's production was in 1984, while the copyright date is for 1985.
- The 2022 Birmingham Repertory Theatre version by Anil Gupta and Richard Pinto was broadcast on BBC Four on 12 March 2023. The production relocated the story to the modern-day Pakistani-Muslim community of Sparkhill, Birmingham and had previously been produced by the Royal Shakespeare Company in 2018.

=== Opera ===
- The composer Kirke Mechem based his opera Tartuffe on the play.

=== Audio ===
- On 10 December 1939, an hour-long adaptation was broadcast on the NBC radio series Great Plays.
- In 1968, Caedmon Records recorded and released on LP (TRS 332) a production performed that same year by the Stratford National Theatre of Canada as part of the Stratford Festival (see "Stratford Shakespeare Festival production history") using the Richard Wilbur translation and directed by Jean Gascon. The cast included Douglas Rain as Orgon and William Hutt as Tartuffe.
- In 2009, BBC Radio 3 broadcast an adaptation directed by Gemma Bodinetz and translated by Roger McGough, based on the 2008 Liverpool Playhouse production (see "Modern Productions" above), with John Ramm as Tartuffe, Joseph Alessi as Orgon, Simon Coates as Cleante, Annabelle Dowler as Dorine, Rebecca Lacey as Elmire, Robert Hastie as Damis and Emily Pithon as Marianne.
- L.A. Theatre Works performed and recorded a production in 2010 (ISBN 1-58081-777-7) with the Richard Wilbur translation and featuring Brian Bedford as Tartuffe, Martin Jarvis as Orgon, Alex Kingston as Elmire, Matthew Rhys as Valere, Gia Carides as Dorine, and John de Lancie as Cleante. The production was directed by Dakin Matthews.
- In 2022, for Molière's 400th Anniversary, a modern English adaptation is released, starring David Serero as Tartuffe.

== Sources ==
- Benedetti, Jean. 1999. Stanislavski: His Life and Art. Revised edition. Original edition published in 1988. London: Methuen. ISBN 0-413-52520-1.
- Garreau, Joseph E. (1984). "Molière", vol. 3, pp. 397–418, in McGraw-Hill Encyclopedia of World Drama, Stanley Hochman, editor in chief. New York: McGraw-Hill. ISBN 9780070791695.
- Koppisch, Michael S. (2002). "Tartuffe, Le, ou l'Imposteur", pp. 450–456, in The Molière Encyclopedia, edited by James F. Gaines. Westport, Connecticut: Greenwood Press. ISBN 9780313312557.
- Molière (1669). Le Tartuffe ou l'Imposteur. Paris: Jean Ribov – via Gallica.
- Brockett, Oscar. 1964. "THE THEATER, an Introduction" published Holt, Rhinehart, and Winston. Inclusive of University of Iowa production, "Tartuffe", includes "The Set Designer", set design and Thesis, a three hundred year commemoration, "A Project in Scene Design and Stage Lighting for Moliere's Tartuffe", by Charles M. Watson, State University of Iowa, 1964.
- The Misanthrope and Tartuffe by Molière, and Richard Wilbur 1965, 1993. A Harvest Book, Harcourt, Brace and Company, New York.
- The Misanthrope, Tartuffe, and other Plays, by Molière, and Maya Slater 2001, Oxfords World Classics, Oxford University Press, Clays Ltd. 2008
