= Les Précieuses ridicules =

Comedy of manner

Les Précieuses ridicules (French pronunciation: [le pʁesjøz ʁidikyl], The Absurd Précieuses or The Affected Ladies) is a one-act satire by Molière in prose. It takes aim at the précieuses, the ultra-witty ladies who indulged in lively conversations, word games and, in a word, préciosité (preciousness). It was adapted into a lyric comedy and a film.

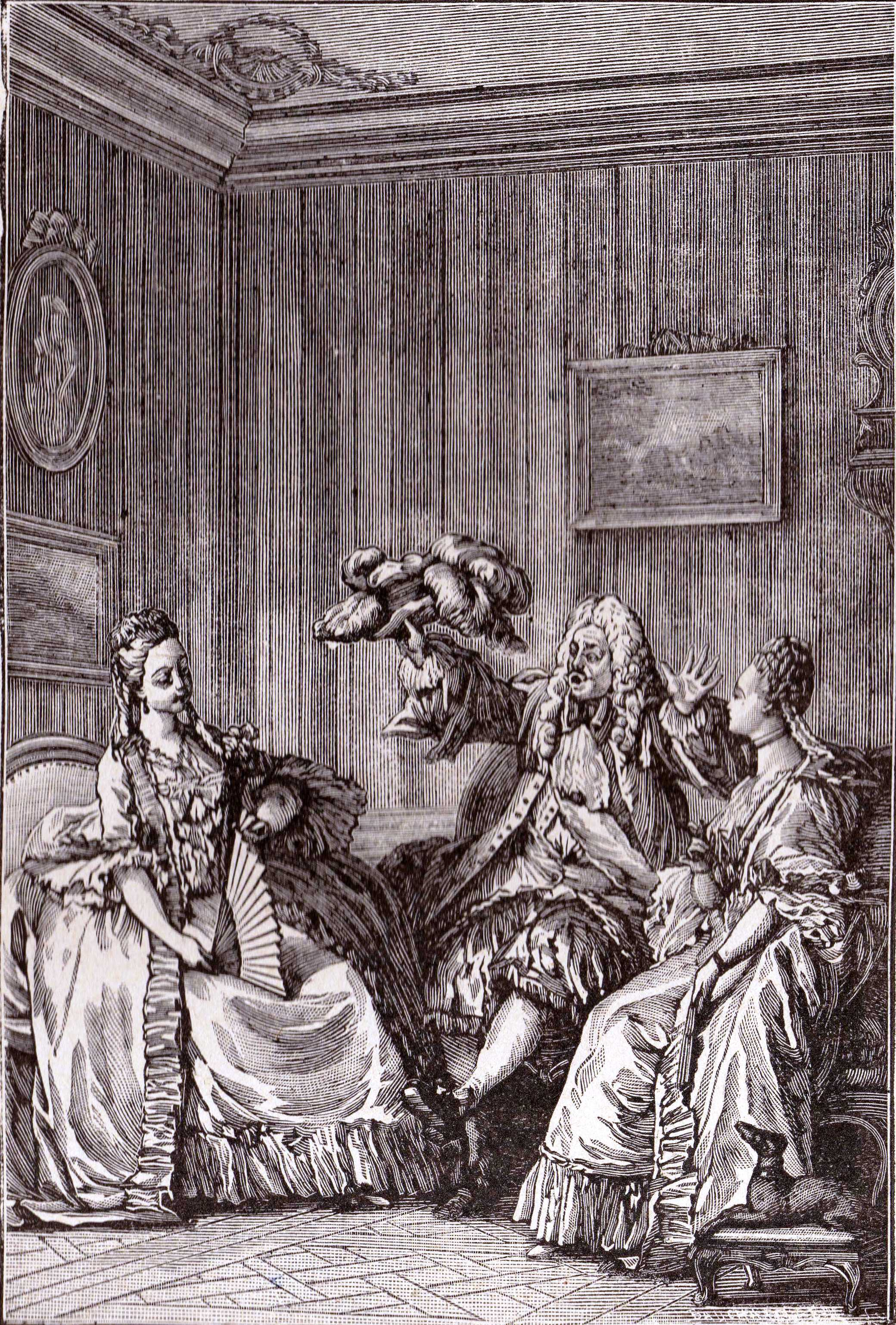
MASCARILLE : What do you think of my little goose? Do you find it goes with my outfit? CATHOS : Absolutely. (from Les Précieuses ridicules) Drawing by Moreau le Jeune.

Les Précieuses ridicules is a biting comedy of manners that brought Molière and his company to the attention of Parisians, after they had toured the provinces for years. The play received its Paris premiere on 18 November 1659 at the Théâtre du Petit-Bourbon. It seems not to have been staged before that in the provinces. It was highly successful and attracted the patronage of Louis XIV to Molière and company. Les Précieuses ridicules still plays well today.

In the play, a man finds two eligible suitors for his daughter and his niece. The young women reject and ridicule them, because they view them as unrefined. In revenge, the men have their valets posing as sophisticated suitors for the women. The trick relies on their naiveté.

== Plot ==
Magdelon and Cathos are the aspiring précieuses, two young women from the provinces who have come to Paris in search of love and jeux d'esprit.

Gorgibus, the father of Magdelon and uncle of Cathos, decides they should marry a pair of eminently eligible young men but the two women find the men unrefined and ridicule them. The men vow to take revenge on les précieuses.

On stage comes Mascarille, a young man who pretends to be a sophisticated man of the world. Magdelon falls in love with him. Next on stage comes another young man, Jodelet, with whom Cathos falls in love.

It is revealed that these two men, Mascarille and Jodelet, are impostors whose real identities are as the valets of the first two men who were scorned and rejected.

As the curtain falls, Gorgibus and les précieuses are ashamed at having fallen for the trick. In the provinces, the young ladies' Parisian pretensions attracted mockery, while in Paris, their puffed-up provincial naiveté and self-esteem proved laughable.

== Characters ==
- La Grange (orig. played by La Grange) – one of the rejected suitors
- Du Croisy (orig. played by Du Croisy) – the other rejected suitor
- Gorgibus (orig. François Bedeau, aka L'Espy) – a good bourgeois man
- Magdelon (orig. Madeleine Béjart) – daughter of Gorgibus and one of the précieuses ridicules
- Cathos (orig. Mlle de Brie) – niece of Gorgibus and the other of the précieuses ridicules
- Marotte (orig. Marotte) – female servant of the précieuses ridicules
- Almanzor (orig. De Brie) – male lackey of the précieuses ridicules
- "Marquis" de Mascarille (orig. Molière) – the valet of La Grange
- "Vicomte" de Jodelet (orig. Jodelet) – the valet of Du Croisy
- Two chair porters (orig. La Grange and Du Croisy)
- Neighbors

The role of the Marquis de Mascarille was originally played by Molière himself while the role of Magdelon was first played by Madeleine Béjart.

== Operatic adaptation ==
Composer Felice Lattuada and librettist Arturo Rossato wrote a commedia lirica based on the text, entitled Le preziose ridicole. It was premiered at Teatro alla Scala, Milan, on February 9, 1929.

== Film ==
Léonce Perret directed a 1934 film adaptation.
