= Béjart =

Béjart is the name of several French actors of the 17th century.

== Family ==
The four actors listed here were children, and grandchildren, of Marie Hérve and Joseph Béjart (died 1643), the holder of a small government post. There were 10 children in the family which was very poor and lived in the Marais, then the theatrical quarter of Paris. Four of the children became notable in the acting profession.

== Madeleine Béjart ==
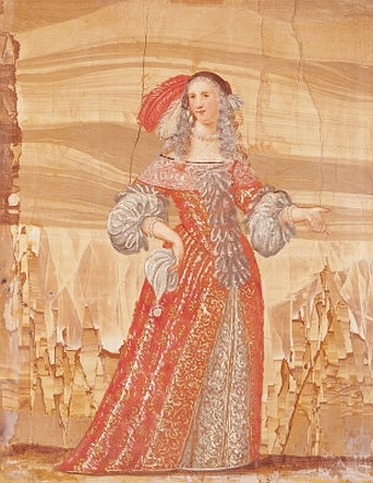
Madeleine Béjart in Les précieuses ridicules.

Madeleine Béjart (8 January 1618 – 17 February 1672), was a French actress and theatre director, one of the most famous French stage actors of the 17th-century. Madeleine was the second child of Joseph and Marie-Herve Bejart. She debuted with her elder brother Joseph at the Theatre du Marais and in the provinces in the late 1630s. Madeleine headed a travelling company to which her sister Geneviève (1631–1675) — who played as Mlle Hervez — and her brothers belonged, before they joined Molière in forming l'Illustre Théâtre.

In 1643 she co-founded, with Molière, the Illustre Théâtre, of which she was co-director. She was described as a skillful administrator with the ability to avoid conflicts among the staff. She could freely choose to perform any of the roles in the plays by Molière. She became famous from her performances in his plays. Gradually, she chose smaller parts and left the main parts to Mademoiselle Du Parc and her daughter Armande Béjart. She had a relationship with Molière. In 1662 Molière married her daughter Armande. This marriage does not seem to have ended her relationship with Molière.

She remained with Molière until her death on 17 February 1672. Madeleine had an illegitimate daughter (1638) by an Italian count, and her conduct on her early travels had not been exemplary, but whatever her private relations with Molière may have been, however acrimonious and violent her temper, she and her family remained faithful to his fortunes. She was a tall, handsome blonde, and an excellent actress, particularly in soubrette parts. Among her creations were Marotte in Les Précieuses ridicules, Lisette in L'École des maris, Dorine in Tartuffe.

A contemporary, Georges de Scudery, described her:

"She was beautiful, she was gallant, she was very intelligent, she sang, she danced well, she played all kinds of instruments, she wrote very nicely in verse and prose and her conversation was very entertaining. She was over all one of the best actresses of her age and her acting had so much charm, that it really inspired all the feigned passion of the plays one saw her represent at the Theatre."

Madeleine's daughter, Armande (1645–1700) was also a famous actress and married Molière.

== Joseph Béjart ==
Their brothers included Joseph Béjart (c. 1617–1659), a strolling player and later a member of Molière's first company (l'Illustre Théatre), accompanying him in his theatrical wanderings, and was with him when he returned permanently to Paris, dying soon after. He created the parts of Lélie in L'Étourdie, and Eraste in Le Dépit amoureux.

== Louis Béjart ==
Joseph's brother Louis (c. 1630–1678) was also in Molière's company during the last years of touring. He created many parts in his brother-in-law's plays — Valère in Le Dépit amoureux, Dubois in Le Misanthrope, Alcantor in Le Mariage forcé, and Don Luis in Le Festin de Pierre — and was an actor of varied talents. As a result of a wound received when interfering in a street brawl, he became lame and retired in 1670 with a pension, the first ever granted by the company to a comedian.

== See also ==
- Maurice Béjart, choreographer
