= Catherine Leclerc du Rose =

French actress

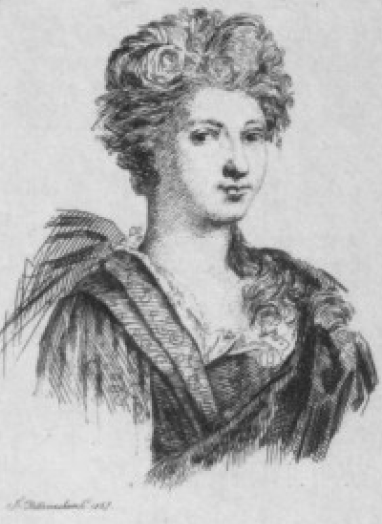
Catherine Leclerc du Rosé

Catherine Leclerc du Rose, also known by her stage name Mademoiselle de Brie' (1630 – ca. 1706), was a French actress. She was a member of the pioneer troupe of both the Molière's company, and of the Comédie-Française. She belonged to the first Sociétaires of the Comédie-Française (see Troupe of the Comédie-Française in 1680).

Catherine Leclerc du Rose was the daughter of actors. De Brie joined Molière's troupe in 1650. She became a member of the Comédie-Française upon its foundation in 1680. She became a member of the Comédie-Dauphine in 1684.

== Notable parts ==
- 1662.12.26 L'Ecole des femmes (Poquelin)
- 1662.12.29 L'Ecole des femmes (Poquelin)
- 1663.10.20 L'Impromptu de Versailles (Poquelin)
- 1664.02.15 Le Mariage forcé (Poquelin, Charpentier, Lully)
- 1664.05.08 La Princesse d'Élide (Poquelin, Lully)
- 1664.06.20 La Thébaïde ou les frères ennemis (Racine)
- 1666.06.04 Le Misanthrope (Poquelin), acteur (trice)
- 1667.06.10 Le Sicilien ou l' Amour peintre (Poquelin)
- 1667.08.05 Tartuffe (Poquelin), acteur (trice)

== Sources ==
- Mademoiselle de Brie
