= Molière =

French playwright and actor (1622–1673)

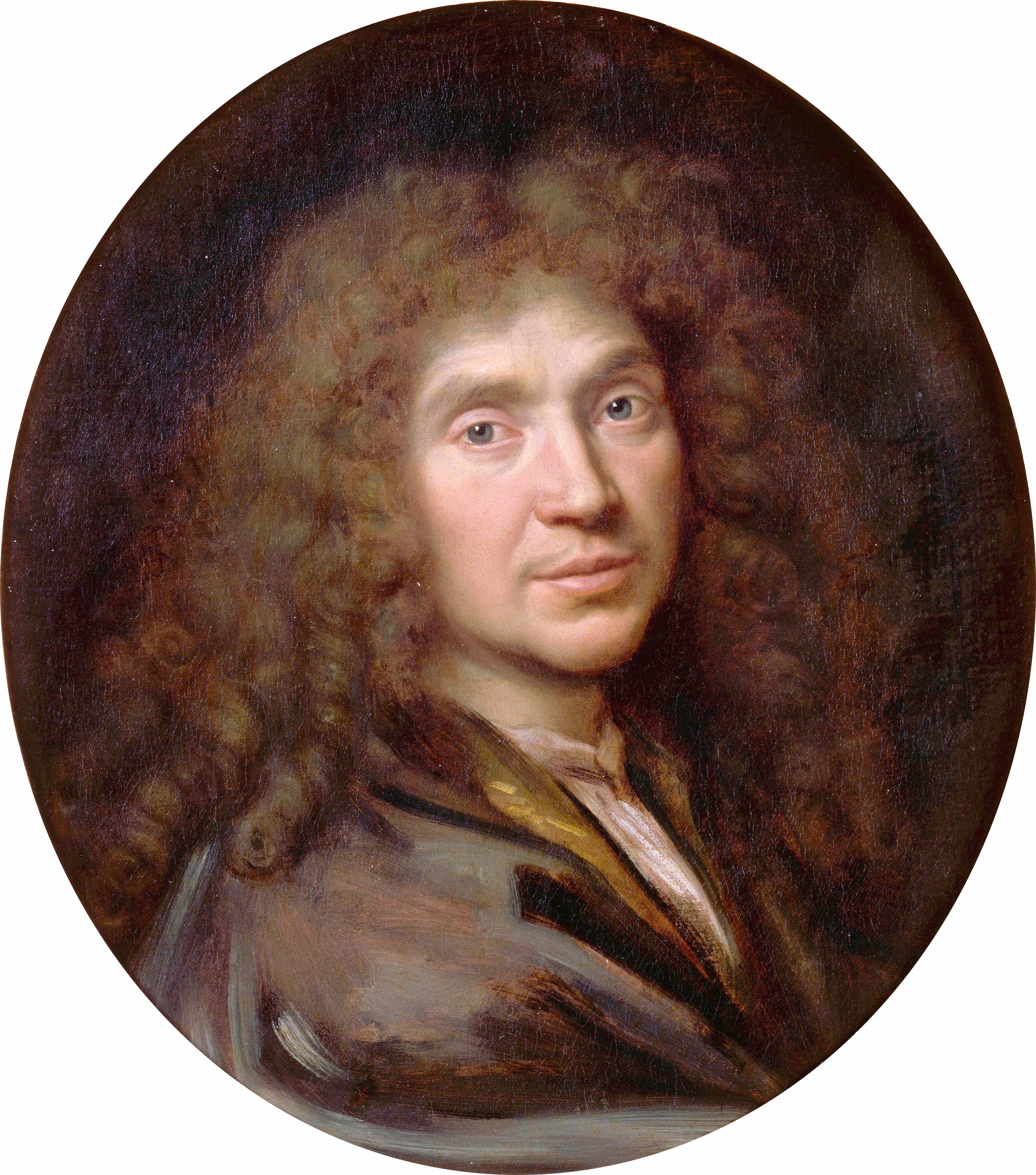
- Portrait of Molière by Pierre Mignard (c. 1658)
- Born: Jean-Baptiste Poquelin before 15 January 1622; Paris, France
- Died: 17 February 1673 (aged 51); Paris, France
- Education: University of Orléans
- Occupations: Playwright; actor
- Spouse: Armande Béjart
- Partner: Madeleine Béjart
- Children: Louis (1664–1664); Marie Madeleine (1665–1723); Pierre (1672–1672)
- Writing career
- Pen name: Molière
- Period: 1645–1673
- Genre: Comedy
- Notable works: Tartuffe; The Misanthrope; The Learned Ladies; The School for Wives; The Miser
- Movement: Classicism

Jean-Baptiste Poquelin (French pronunciation: [ʒɑ̃ batist pɔklɛ̃]; 15 January 1622 (baptised) – 17 February 1673), known by his stage name Molière (UK: /ˈmɒliɛər, ˈmoʊl-/, US: /moʊlˈjɛər, ˌmoʊliˈɛər/; French: [mɔljɛʁ]), was a French playwright, actor, and poet, widely regarded as one of the great writers in the French language and world literature. His extant works include comedies, farces, tragicomedies, comédie-ballets, and more. His plays have been translated into every major living language and are performed at the Comédie-Française more often than those of any other playwright today. His influence is such that the French language is often referred to as the "language of Molière".

Born into a prosperous family and having studied at the Collège de Clermont (now Lycée Louis-le-Grand), Molière was well suited to begin a life in the theatre. Thirteen years as an itinerant actor helped him polish his comedic abilities while he began writing, combining Commedia dell'arte elements with the more refined French comedy.

Through the patronage of aristocrats including Philippe I, Duke of Orléans—the brother of Louis XIV—Molière procured a command performance before the King at the Louvre. Performing a classic play by Pierre Corneille and a farce of his own, The Doctor in Love, Molière was granted the use of the grande salle of the Petit-Bourbon near the Louvre, a spacious room appointed for theatrical performances. Later, he was granted the use of the theatre in the Palais-Royal. In both locations, Molière found success among Parisians with plays such as The Affected Ladies, The School for Husbands, and The School for Wives. This royal favour brought a royal pension to his troupe and the title Troupe du Roi ("The King's Troupe"). Molière continued as the official author of court entertainments.

Despite the adulation of the court and Parisians, Molière's satires attracted criticism from other circles. For Tartuffe's impiety, the Catholic Church in France denounced this study of religious hypocrisy, which was followed by a ban by the Parlement, while Don Juan was withdrawn and never restaged by Molière. His hard work in so many theatrical capacities took its toll on his health and, by 1667, he was forced to take a break from the stage. In 1673, during a production of his final play, The Imaginary Invalid, Molière, who suffered from pulmonary tuberculosis, was seized by a coughing fit and a haemorrhage while playing the hypochondriac Argan; he finished the performance but collapsed again and died a few hours later.

== Life ==
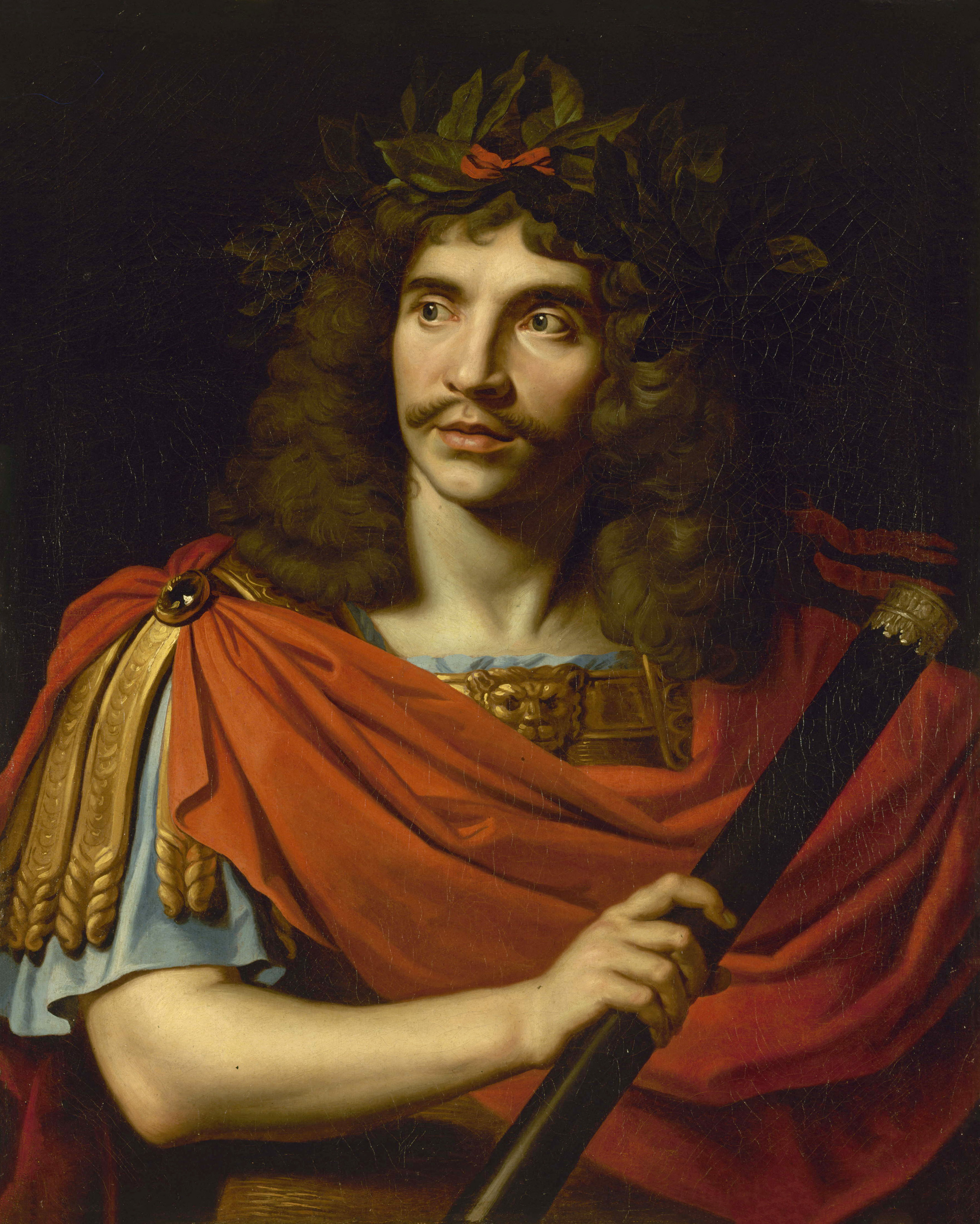
Molière as Caesar in The Death of Pompey by Pierre Corneille, portrait by Nicolas Mignard

Molière was born in Paris shortly before his christening as Jean Poquelin on 15 January 1622. Known as Jean-Baptiste, he was the first son of Jean Poquelin and Marie Cressé, who had married on 27 April 1621. His mother was the daughter of a prosperous bourgeois family. Upon seeing him for the first time, a maid exclaimed, "Le nez!", a reference to the infant's large nose. Molière was called "Le Nez" by his family from that time. He lost his mother when he was 10, and he does not seem to have been particularly close to his father. After his mother's death, he lived with his father above the Pavillon des Singes on the rue Saint-Honoré, an affluent area of Paris. It is likely that his education commenced with studies at a Parisian elementary school, followed by his enrollment in the prestigious Jesuit Collège de Clermont, where he completed his studies in a strict academic environment and got a first taste of life on the stage.

In 1631, his father Jean Poquelin purchased from the court of Louis XIII the posts of "valet de chambre ordinaire et tapissier du Roi" ("valet of the King's chamber and keeper of carpets and upholstery"). His son assumed the same posts in 1641. The title required only three months' work and an initial cost of 1,200 livres; the title paid 300 livres a year and provided a number of lucrative contracts. Molière also studied as a provincial lawyer some time around 1642, probably in Orléans, but it is not documented that he ever qualified. So far he had followed his father's plans, which had served him well; he had mingled with nobility at the Collège de Clermont and seemed destined for a career in office.

In June 1643, when Molière was 21, he decided to abandon his social class and pursue a career on the stage. Taking leave of his father, he joined the actress Madeleine Béjart, with whom he had crossed paths before, and founded the Illustre Théâtre with 630 livres. They were later joined by Madeleine's brother and sister.

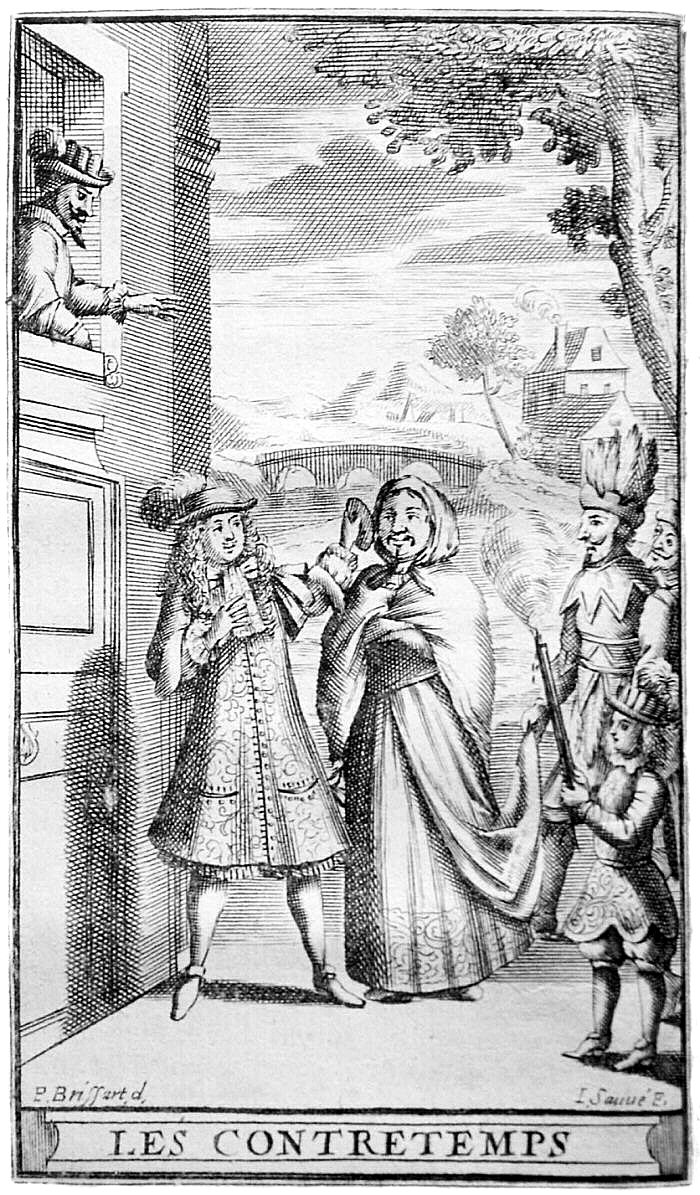
Illustration after Pierre Brissart for the printed text of L'Étourdi ou les Contretemps

The theatre troupe went bankrupt in 1645. Molière had become head of the troupe, due in part, perhaps, to his acting prowess and his legal training. However, the troupe had acquired large debts, mostly for the rent of the theatre (a court for jeu de paume), for which they owed 2000 livres. Historians differ as to whether his father or the lover of a member of his troupe paid his debts; either way, after a 24-hour stint in prison he returned to the acting circuit. It was at this time that he began to use the pseudonym Molière, possibly inspired by a small village of the same name in the Midi near Le Vigan. It was likely that he changed his name to spare his father the shame of having an actor in the family (actors, although no longer vilified by the state under Louis XIV, were still not allowed to be buried in sacred ground).

After his imprisonment, he and Madeleine began a theatrical circuit of the provinces with a new theatre troupe; this life was to last about twelve years, during which he initially played in the company of Charles Dufresne, and subsequently created a company of his own, which had sufficient success and obtained the patronage of Philippe I, Duke of Orléans. Few plays survive from this period. The most noteworthy are L'Étourdi ou les Contretemps (The Bungler) and Le Docteur Amoureux (The Doctor in Love); with these two plays, Molière moved away from the heavy influence of the Italian improvisational Commedia dell'arte, and displayed his talent for mockery. In the course of his travels he met Armand, Prince of Conti, the governor of Languedoc, who became his patron, and named his company after him. This friendship later ended when Armand, having contracted syphilis from a courtesan, turned toward religion and joined Molière's enemies in the Parti des Dévots and the Compagnie de Saint Sacrement.

In Lyon, Mademoiselle Du Parc, known as Marquise, joined the company. Marquise was courted, in vain, by Pierre Corneille and later became the lover of Jean Racine. Racine offered Molière his tragedy Théagène et Chariclée (one of the early works he wrote after he had abandoned his theology studies), but Molière would not perform it, though he encouraged Racine to pursue his artistic career.

=== Return to Paris ===
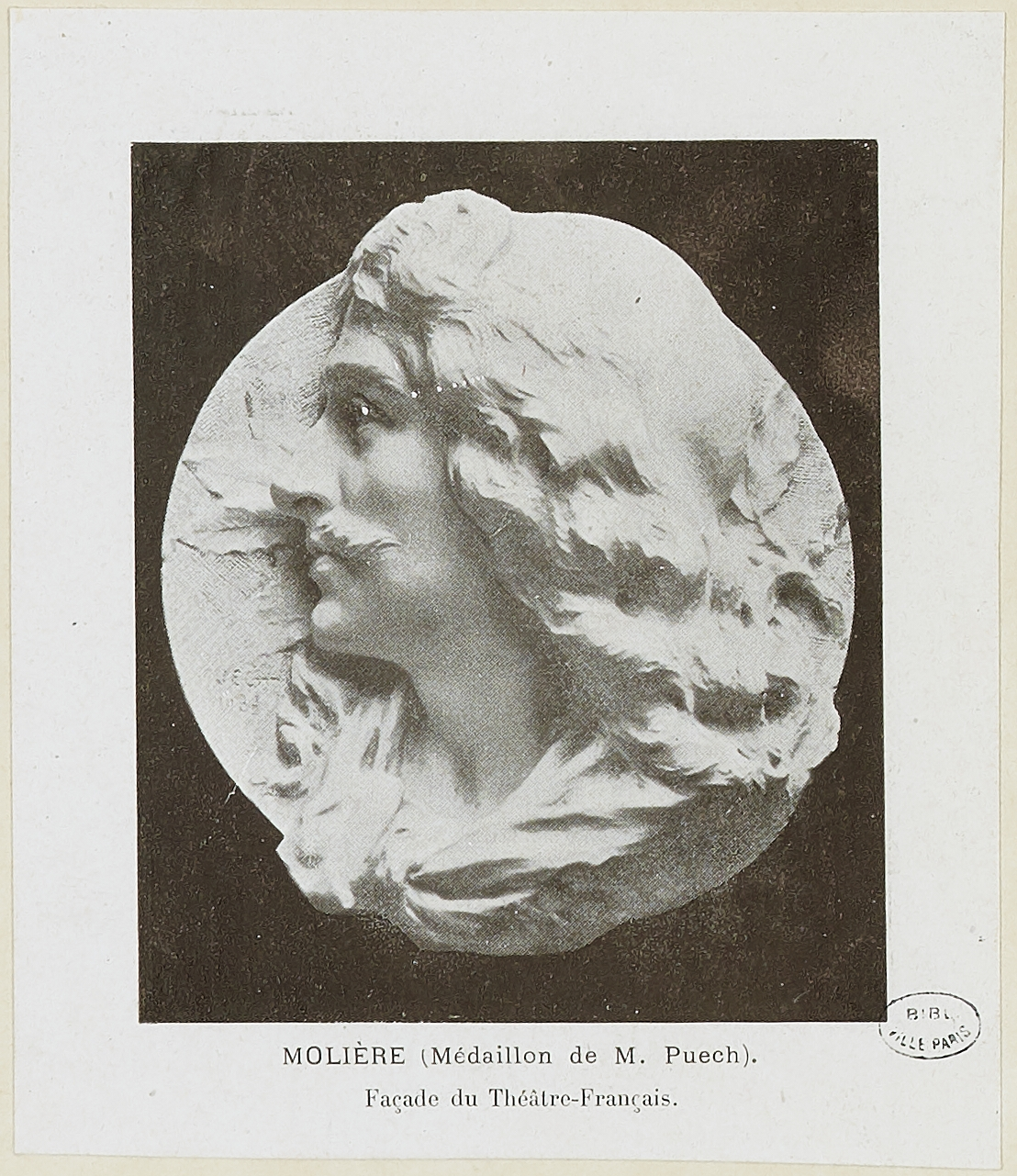
Medallion depicting Molière, façade of the Théâtre-Français, Paris.

Molière was forced to reach Paris in stages, staying outside for a few weeks in order to promote himself with society gentlemen and allow his reputation to feed in to Paris. Molière reached Paris in 1658 and performed in front of the King at the Louvre (then for rent as a theatre) in Corneille's tragedy Nicomède and in the farce Le Docteur Amoureux with some success. He was awarded the title of Troupe de Monsieur (Monsieur being the honorific for the king's brother Philippe I, Duke of Orléans). With the help of Monsieur, his company was allowed to share the theatre in the large hall of the Petit-Bourbon with the Italian Commedia dell'arte company of Tiberio Fiorillo, famous for the character of Scaramouche. (The two companies performed in the theatre on different nights.) The premiere of Molière's Les Précieuses Ridicules (The Affected Young Ladies) took place at the Petit-Bourbon on 18 November 1659.

Les Précieuses Ridicules was the first of Molière's many attempts to satirize certain societal mannerisms and affectations then common in France. It is widely accepted that the plot was based on Samuel Chappuzeau's Le Cercle des Femmes of 1656. He primarily mocks the Académie Française, a group created by Richelieu under a royal patent to establish the rules of the fledgling French theatre. The Académie preached unity of time, action, and styles of verse. Molière is often associated with the claim that comedy castigat ridendo mores or "criticises customs through humour" (a phrase in fact coined by his contemporary Jean de Santeuil and sometimes mistaken for a classical Latin proverb).

=== Height of fame ===
Despite his own preference for tragedy, which he had tried to further with the Illustre Théâtre, Molière became famous for his farces, which were generally in one act and performed after the tragedy. Some of these farces were only partly written, and were played in the style of Commedia dell'arte with improvisation over a canovaccio (a vague plot outline). He began to write full, five-act comedies in verse (L'Étourdi (Lyon, 1654) and Le dépit amoureux (Béziers, 1656)), which although immersed in the gags of contemporary Italian troupes, were successful as part of Madeleine Béjart and Molière's plans to win aristocratic patronage and, ultimately, move the troupe to a position in a Paris theater-venue. Later Molière concentrated on writing musical comedies, in which the drama is interrupted by songs and/or dances, but for years the fundamentals of numerous comedy-traditions would remain strong, especially Italian (e.g. the semi-improvisatory style that in the 1750s writers started calling commedia dell'arte), Spanish, and French plays, all also drawing on classical models (e.g. Plautus and Terence), especially the trope of the clever slave/servant.

Les précieuses ridicules won Molière the attention and the criticism of many, but it was not a popular success. He then asked Fiorillo to teach him the techniques of Commedia dell'arte. His 1660 play Sganarelle, ou Le Cocu imaginaire (The Imaginary Cuckold) seems to be a tribute both to Commedia dell'arte and to his teacher. Its theme of marital relationships dramatizes Molière's pessimistic views on the falsity inherent in human relationships. This view is also evident in his later works and was a source of inspiration for many later authors, including (with different effect), 20th century Nobel Prize winner Luigi Pirandello. It describes a kind of round dance where two couples believe that each of their partners has been betrayed by the other's and is the first in Molière's "Jealousy series", which includes Dom Garcie de Navarre, L'École des maris and L'École des femmes.

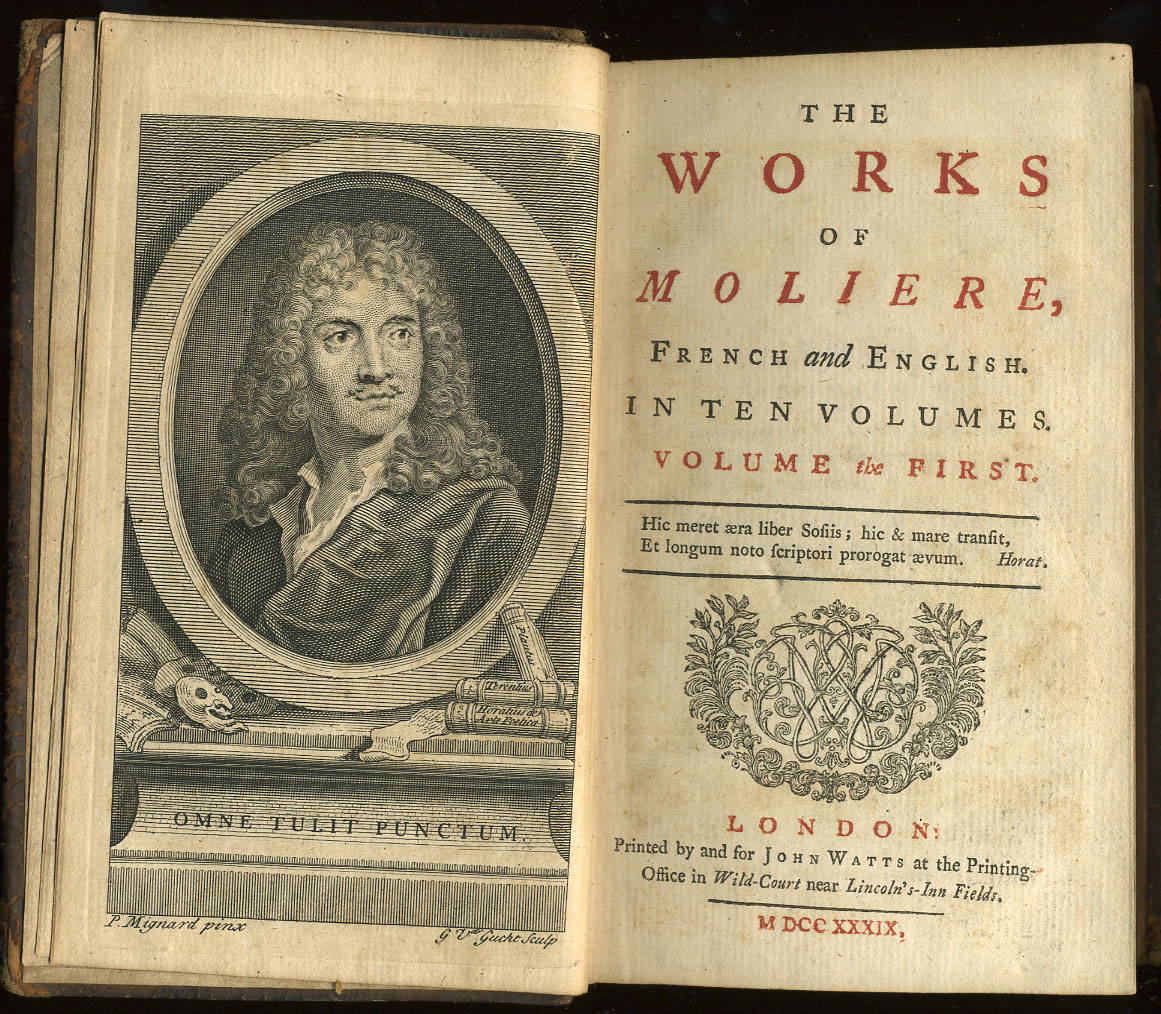
First volume of a 1739 translation into English of all of Molière's plays, printed by John Watts.

In 1660, the Petit-Bourbon was demolished to make way for the eastern expansion of the Louvre, but Molière's company was allowed to move into the abandoned theatre in the east wing of the Palais-Royal. After a period of refurbishment they opened there on 20 January 1661. In order to please his patron, Monsieur, who was so enthralled with entertainment and art that he was soon excluded from state affairs, Molière wrote and played Dom Garcie de Navarre ou Le Prince jaloux (The Jealous Prince, 4 February 1661), a heroic comedy derived from a work of Cicognini. Two other comedies of the same year were the successful L'École des maris (The School for Husbands) and Les Fâcheux (The Bores), subtitled Comédie faite pour les divertissements du Roi (a comedy for the King's amusements) because it was performed during a series of parties that Nicolas Fouquet gave in honor of the sovereign. These entertainments led Jean-Baptiste Colbert to demand the arrest of Fouquet for wasting public money, and he was condemned to life imprisonment.

On 20 February 1662, Molière married Armande Béjart, whom he believed to be the sister of Madeleine. (She may have been her illegitimate daughter with the Duke of Modena.) The same year, he premiered L'École des femmes (The School for Wives), subsequently regarded as a masterpiece. It poked fun at the limited education that was given to daughters of rich families and reflected Molière's own marriage. Both this work and his marriage attracted much criticism. The play sparked the protest called the "Quarrel of L'École des femmes". On the artistic side he responded with two lesser-known works: La Critique de "L'École des femmes", in which he imagined the spectators of his previous work attending it. The piece mocks the people who had criticised L'École des femmes by showing them at dinner after watching the play; it addresses all the criticism raised about the piece by presenting the critics' arguments and then dismissing them. This was the so-called Guerre comique (War of Comedy), in which the opposite side was taken by writers like Donneau de Visé, Edmé Boursault, and Montfleury.

However, more serious opposition was brewing, focusing on Molière's politics and his personal life. A so-called parti des Dévots arose in French high society, who protested against Molière's excessive "realism" and irreverence, which were causing some embarrassment. These people accused Molière of having married his daughter. The Prince of Conti, once Molière's friend, joined them. Molière had other enemies, too, among them the Jansenists and some traditional authors. However, the king expressed support for the Molière, granting him a pension and agreeing to be the godfather of Molière's first son. Boileau also supported him through statements that he included in his Art poétique.

Molière's friendship with Jean-Baptiste Lully influenced him towards writing his Le Mariage forcé and La Princesse d'Élide (subtitled as Comédie galante mêlée de musique et d'entrées de ballet), written for Les Plaisirs de l'Isle enchantée, royal "divertissements", at the Palace of Versailles.

Tartuffe, ou L'Imposteur was also performed at Versailles, in 1664, and created the greatest scandal of Molière's artistic career. Its depiction of the hypocrisy of the dominant classes was taken as an outrage and violently contested. It also aroused the wrath of the Jansenists and the play was banned.

Molière was always careful not to attack the institution of monarchy. He earned a position as one of the king's favourites and enjoyed his protection from the attacks of the court. The king allegedly suggested that Molière suspend performances of Tartuffe, and the author rapidly wrote Dom Juan ou le Festin de Pierre to replace it. It was a strange work, derived from a work by Tirso de Molina and rendered in a prose that still seems modern today. It describes the story of an atheist who becomes a religious hypocrite and, for this, is punished by God. This work too was quickly suspended. The king, demonstrating his protection once again, became the new official sponsor of Molière's troupe.

With music by Lully, Molière presented L'Amour médecin (Love Doctor or Medical Love). Subtitles on this occasion reported that the work was given "par ordre du Roi" (by order of the king) and this work was received much more warmly than its predecessors.

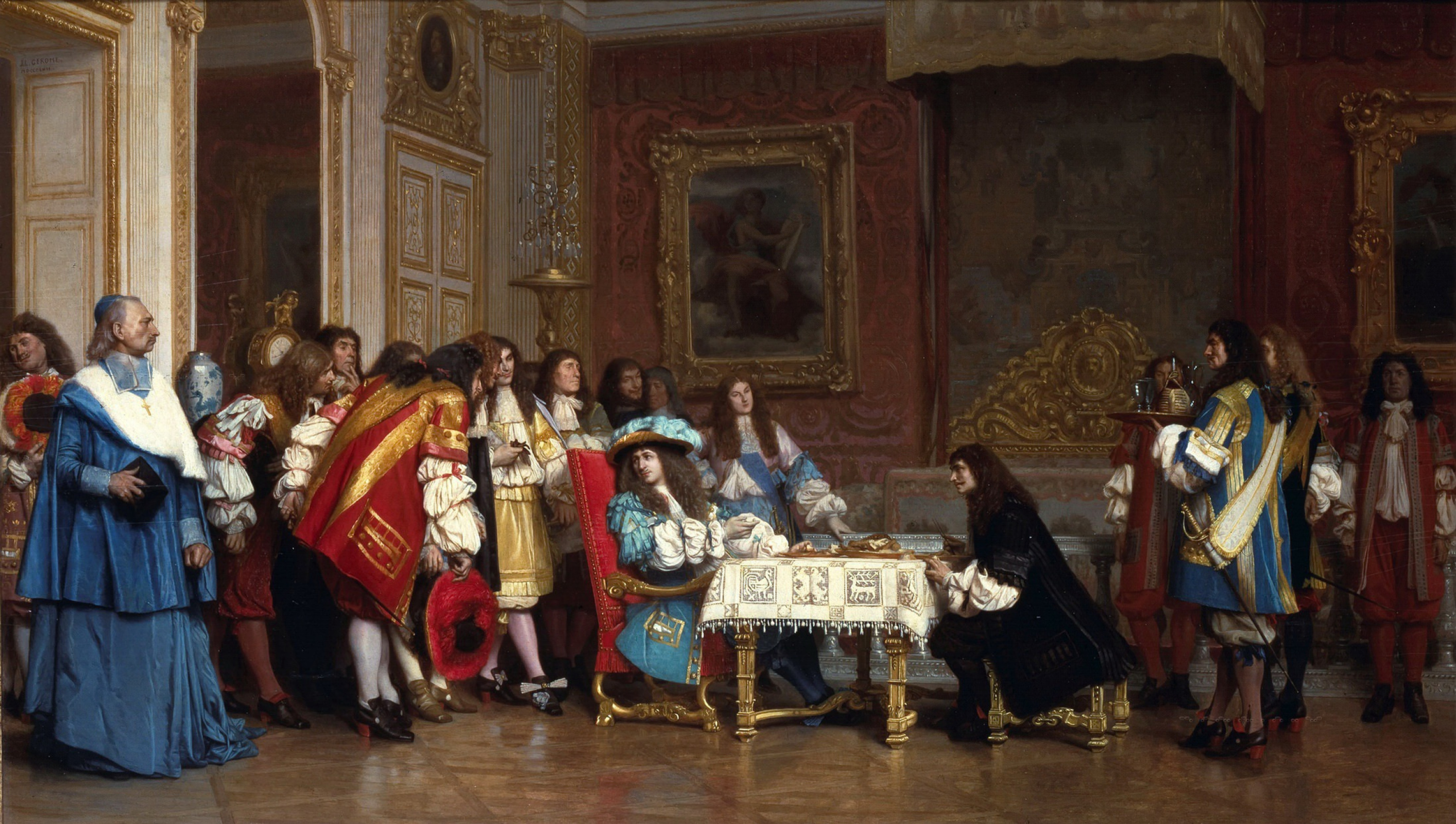
Louis XIV invites Molière to share his supper—an unfounded Romantic anecdote, illustrated in 1863 painting by Jean-Léon Gérôme

In 1666, Le Misanthrope was produced. It is now widely regarded as Molière's most refined masterpiece, the one with the highest moral content, but it was little appreciated at the time. It caused the "conversion" of Donneau de Visé, who became fond of his theatre. But it was a commercial flop, forcing Molière to immediately write Le médecin malgré lui (The Doctor Despite Himself), a satire against the official sciences. This was a success despite a moral treatise by the Prince of Conti, criticizing the theatre in general and Molière in particular. In several of his plays, Molière depicted the physicians of his day as pompous individuals who speak (poor) Latin to impress others with false erudition, and know only clysters and bleedings as (ineffective) remedies.

After the Mélicerte and the Pastorale comique, he tried again to perform a revised Tartuffe in 1667, this time with the name of Panulphe or L'Imposteur. As soon as the King left Paris for a tour, Lamoignon and the archbishop banned the play. The King finally imposed respect for Tartuffe a few years later, after he had gained more power over the clergy.

Molière, now ill, wrote less. Le Sicilien ou L'Amour peintre was written for festivities at the castle of Saint-Germain-en-Laye, and was followed in 1668 by Amphitryon, inspired both by Plautus' work of the same name and Jean Rotrou's successful reconfiguration of the drama. With some conjecture, Molière's play can be seen to allude to the love affairs of Louis XIV, then king of France. George Dandin, ou Le mari confondu (The Confounded Husband) was little appreciated, but success returned with L'Avare (The Miser), now very well known.

With Lully, he again used music for Monsieur de Pourceaugnac, for Les Amants magnifiques, and finally for Le Bourgeois gentilhomme (The Middle Class Gentleman), another of his masterpieces. It is claimed to be particularly directed against Colbert, the minister who had condemned his old patron Fouquet. The collaboration with Lully ended with a tragédie et ballet, Psyché, written in collaboration with Pierre Corneille and Philippe Quinault.

In 1672, Madeleine Béjart died, and Molière suffered from this loss and from the worsening of his own illness. Nevertheless, he wrote a successful Les Fourberies de Scapin ("Scapin's Deceits"), a farce and a comedy in five acts. His following play, La Comtesse d'Escarbagnas, is considered one of his lesser works.

Les Femmes savantes (The Learned Ladies) of 1672 is considered another of Molière's masterpieces. It was born from the termination of the legal use of music in theatre, since Lully had patented the opera in France (and taken most of the best available singers for his own performances), so Molière had to go back to his traditional genre. It was a great success, and it led to his last work, which is still held in high esteem.

In his 14 years in Paris, Molière single-handedly wrote 31 of the 85 plays performed on his stage.

=== Les Comédies-Ballets ===
In 1661, Molière introduced the comédies-ballets in conjunction with Les Fâcheux. These ballets were a transitional form of dance performance between the court ballets of Louis XIV and the art of professional theatre which was developing in the advent of the use of the proscenium stage. The comédies-ballets developed accidentally when Molière was enlisted to mount both a play and a ballet in the honor of Louis XIV and found that he did not have a big enough cast to meet these demands. Molière therefore decided to combine the ballet and the play so that his goal could be met while the performers catch their breath and change costume. The risky move paid off and Molière was asked to produce twelve more comédies-ballets before his death. During the comédies-ballets, Molière collaborated with Pierre Beauchamp. who codified the five balletic positions of the feet and arms and was largely responsible for the creation of the Beauchamp-Feuillet dance notation. Molière also collaborated with Jean-Baptiste Lully. Lully was a dancer, choreographer, and composer, whose dominant reign at the Paris Opéra lasted 15 years. Under his command, ballet and opera rightly became professional arts unto themselves. The comédies-ballets closely integrated dance with music and the action of the play and the style of continuity distinctly separated these performances from the court ballets of the time; additionally, the comédies-ballets demanded that both the dancers and the actors play an important role in advancing the story. Similar to the court ballets, both professionally trained dancers and courtiers socialized together at the comédies-ballets - Louis XIV even played the part of an Egyptian in Molière's Le Mariage forcé (1664) and also appeared as Neptune and Apollo in his retirement performance of Les Amants magnifiques (1670).

== Death ==
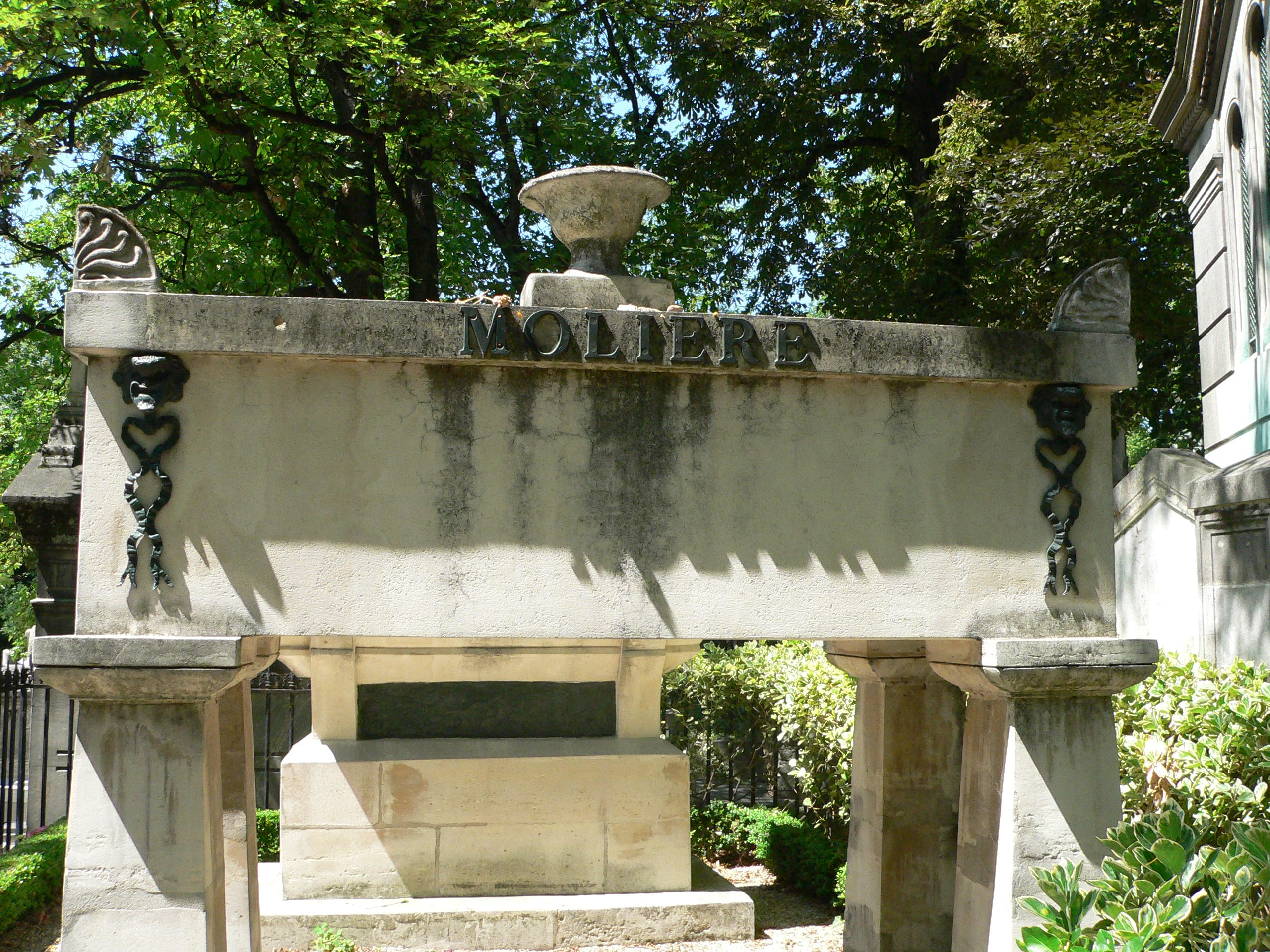
Molière's tomb at the Père Lachaise Cemetery. La Fontaine's is visible just beyond.

Molière suffered from pulmonary tuberculosis, possibly contracted when he was imprisoned for debt as a young man. The circumstances of Molière's death, on 17 February 1673, became legend. He collapsed on stage in a fit of coughing and haemorrhaging while performing in the last play he had written, which had lavish ballets performed to the music of Marc-Antoine Charpentier and which ironically was titled Le Malade imaginaire (The Imaginary Invalid). Molière insisted on completing his performance. Afterwards he collapsed again with another, larger haemorrhage before being taken home, where he died a few hours later, without receiving the last rites because two priests refused to visit him while a third arrived too late. The superstition that green brings bad luck to actors is said to originate from the colour of the clothing he was wearing at the time of his death.

Under French law at the time, actors were not allowed to be buried in the sacred ground of a cemetery. However, Molière's widow, Armande, asked the King if her spouse could be granted a normal funeral at night. The King agreed and Molière's body was buried in the part of the cemetery reserved for unbaptised infants.

In 1792, his remains were brought to the museum of French monuments, and in 1817, transferred to Père Lachaise Cemetery in Paris, close to those of La Fontaine.

== Reception of his works ==
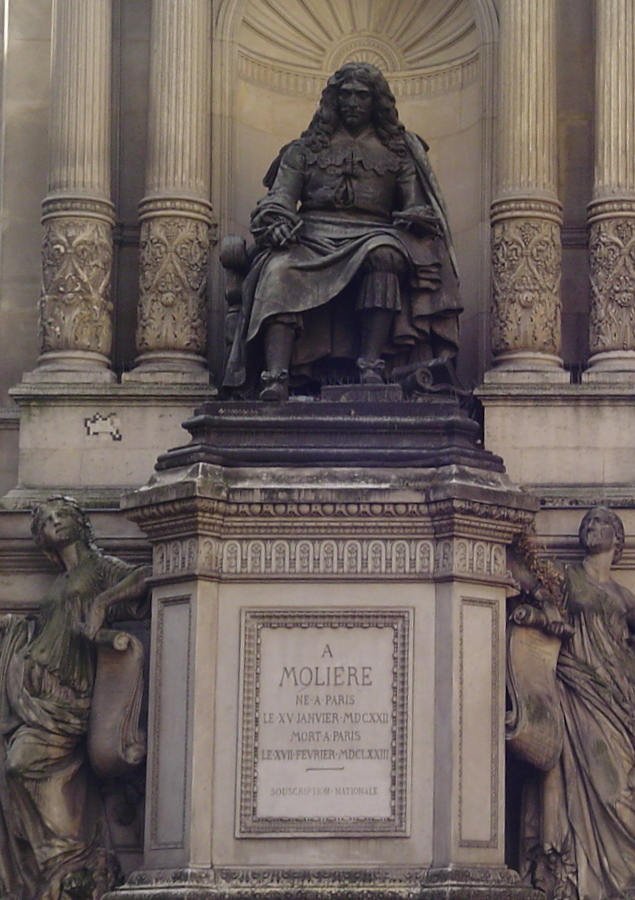
Molière statue on the Fontaine Molière, corner of Rue de Richelieu and Rue Molière in Paris

Though conventional thinkers, religious leaders and medical professionals in Molière's time criticised his work, their ideas did not really diminish his widespread success with the public. Other playwrights and companies began to emulate his dramatic style in England and in France. Molière's works continued to garner positive feedback in 18th-century England, but they were not so warmly welcomed in France at this time. However, during the French Restoration of the 19th century, Molière's comedies became popular with both the French public and the critics. Romanticists admired his plays for the unconventional individualism they portrayed. 20th-century scholars have carried on this interest in Molière and his plays and have continued to study a wide array of issues relating to this playwright. Many critics now are shifting their attention from the philosophical, religious and moral implications in his comedies to the study of his comic technique.

Molière's works were translated into English prose by John Ozell in 1714, but the first complete version in English, by Baker and Miller in 1739, remained "influential" and was long reprinted. The first to offer full translations of Molière's verse plays such as Tartuffe into English verse was Curtis Hidden Page, who produced blank verse versions of three of the plays in his 1908 translation. Since then, notable translations have been made by Richard Wilbur, Donald M. Frame, Justin Fleming and many others.

In his memoir A Terrible Liar, actor Hume Cronyn writes that, in 1962, celebrated actor Laurence Olivier criticized Molière. According to Cronyn, he mentioned to Olivier that he (Cronyn) was about to play the title role in The Miser, and that Olivier then responded "Molière? Funny as a baby's open grave." Cronyn comments on the incident: "You may imagine how that made me feel. Fortunately, he was dead wrong."

Author Martha Bellinger points out that:

[Molière] has been accused of not having a consistent, organic style, of using faulty grammar, of mixing his metaphors, and of using unnecessary words for the purpose of filling out his lines. All these things are occasionally true, but they are trifles in comparison to the wealth of character he portrayed, to his brilliancy of wit, and to the resourcefulness of his technique. He was wary of sensibility or pathos; but in place of pathos he had "melancholy—a puissant and searching melancholy, which strangely sustains his inexhaustible mirth and his triumphant gaiety".

== Influence on French culture ==
Molière is considered the creator of modern French comedy. Many words or phrases introduced in Molière's plays are still used in current French:

- A tartuffe is a hypocrite, especially a hypocrite displaying affected morality or religious piety.
- A harpagon, named after the main character of The Miser, is an obsessively greedy and cheap man.
- The statue of the Commander (statue du Commandeur) from Dom Juan is used as a model of implacable rigidity (raide comme la statue du Commandeur).
- In Les Fourberies de Scapin, Act II, scene 7, Géronte is asked for ransom money for his son, allegedly held in a galley. He repeats, "What the deuce did he want to go into that galley for?" (Que diable allait-il faire dans cette galère?) The phrase "to go into that galley" is used to describe unnecessary difficulties a person has sought, and galère ("galley") means a difficult and chaotic situation.
- In Tartuffe, act 3, scene 2, Tartuffe insists that Dorine take a handkerchief to cover up her bosom, saying, "Cover that bosom which I ought not to see" (Couvrez ce sein que je ne saurais voir). This phrase (often with cachez, "hide", instead of couvrez, and often with some other item replacing sein) is frequently used to imply that someone else is calling for something to be hidden or ignored out of their own hypocrisy, disingenuousness, censoriousness, etc.
- In Le médecin malgré lui, forced to impersonate a doctor, the chancer Sganarelle examines a young woman who is faking muteness in order to delay an arranged marriage. He then delivers to her father a "diagnosis" which consists of strings of gibberish, dog latin and recursive explanations which conclude with an authoritative "and so that is why your daughter is mute" (Et voilà pourquoi votre fille est muette). The phrase is used wholesale to mock an unsatisfactory explanation.
- Monsieur Jourdain in Le Bourgeois gentilhomme arranges to be tutored in good manners and culture, and is delighted to learn that, because every statement that is not poetry is prose, he therefore has been speaking prose for 40 years without knowing it (Par ma foi, il y a plus de quarante ans que je dis de la prose, sans que j'en susse rien). The more modern phrase "je parle de la prose sans le savoir" is used by a person who realizes that he was more skilled or better aligned than he thought.
- In the Comédie-ballet "George Dandin" (1668), Act I, scene 7, the main character uses the phrase Tu l'as voulu, George Dandin ("You wanted it, George Dandin") to address himself when his rich wife cheats on him. Now the phrase is used to reproach someone ironically, something like "You did it yourself".

== Portrayals of Molière ==
Molière plays a small part in Alexandre Dumas's novel The Vicomte of Bragelonne, in which he is seen taking inspiration from the musketeer Porthos for his central character in Le Bourgeois gentilhomme.

Russian writer Mikhail Bulgakov wrote a semi-fictitious biography-tribute to Molière, titled Life of Mr. de Molière. It was written in 1932–1933 and first published 1962.

The French 1978 film simply titled Molière directed by Ariane Mnouchkine and starring Philippe Caubère presents his complete biography. It was in competition for the Palme d'Or at Cannes in 1978.

He is portrayed among other writers in The Blasphemers' Banquet (1989).

The 2000 film Le Roi Danse (The King Dances), in which Molière is played by Tchéky Karyo, shows his collaborations with Jean-Baptiste Lully, as well as his illness and on-stage death.

The 2007 French film Molière was more loosely based on the life of Molière, starring Romain Duris, Fabrice Luchini and Ludivine Sagnier.

David Hirson's play La Bête, written in the style of Molière, includes the character Elomire as an anagrammatic parody of him.

The 2023 musical Molière, l'Opéra Urbain, directed by Bruno Berberes and staged at the Dôme de Paris from 11 November 2023, to 18 February 2024, is a retelling of the life of Molière using a blend of historical costuming with contemporary artistic styles in staging and musical genres.

== List of major works ==
- Le Médecin volant (1645)—The Flying Doctor
- La Jalousie du barbouillé (1650)—The Jealousy of le Barbouillé
- L'Étourdi ou les Contretemps (1655)—The Blunderer, or, the Counterplots
- Le Dépit amoureux (16 December 1656)—The Love-Tiff
- Le Docteur amoureux (1658), the first play performed by Molière's troupe for Louis XIV (now lost)—The Doctor in Love
- Les Précieuses ridicules (18 November 1659)—The Affected Young Ladies
- Sganarelle ou Le Cocu imaginaire (28 May 1660)—Sganarelle, or the Imaginary Cuckold
- Dom Garcie de Navarre ou Le Prince jaloux (4 February 1661)—Don Garcia of Navarre or the Jealous Prince
- L'École des maris (24 June 1661)—The School for Husbands
- Les Fâcheux (17 August 1661)—The Bores (also translated The Mad)
- L'École des femmes (26 December 1662; adapted into The Amorous Flea, 1964)—The School for Wives
- La Jalousie du Gros-René (15 April 1663; now lost)—The Jealousy of Gros-René
- La Critique de l'école des femmes (1 June 1663)—Critique of the School for Wives
- L'Impromptu de Versailles (14 October 1663)—The Versailles Impromptu
- Le Mariage forcé (29 January 1664)—The Forced Marriage
- Gros-René, petit enfant (27 April 1664; now lost)—Gros-René, Small Child
- La Princesse d'Élide (8 May 1664)—The Princess of Elis
- Tartuffe ou L'Imposteur (12 May 1664)—Tartuffe, or, the Impostor
- Dom Juan ou Le Festin de pierre (15 February 1665)—Don Juan, or, The Stone Banquet (subtitle also translated The Stone Guest, The Feast with the Statue, &c.)
- L'Amour médecin (15 September 1665)—Love Is the Doctor
- Le Misanthrope ou L'Atrabilaire amoureux (4 June 1666)—The Misanthrope, or, the Cantankerous Lover
- Le Médecin malgré lui (6 August 1666)—The Doctor in Spite of Himself
- Mélicerte (2 December 1666)
- Pastorale comique (5 January 1667)—Comic Pastoral
- Le Sicilien ou L'Amour peintre (14 February 1667)—The Sicilian, or Love the Painter
- Amphitryon (13 January 1668)
- George Dandin ou Le Mari confondu (18 July 1668)—George Dandin, or the Abashed Husband
- L'Avare (9 September 1668)—The Miser
- Monsieur de Pourceaugnac (6 October 1669)
- Les Amants magnifiques (4 February 1670)—The Magnificent Lovers
- Le Bourgeois gentilhomme (14 October 1670)—The Bourgeois Gentleman
- Psyché (17 January 1671)—Psyche
- Les Fourberies de Scapin (24 May 1671)—The Impostures of Scapin
- La Comtesse d'Escarbagnas (2 December 1671)—The Countess of Escarbagnas
- Les Femmes savantes (11 March 1672)—The Learned Ladies
- Le Malade imaginaire (10 February 1673)—The Imaginary Invalid (or The Hypochondriac)

== See also ==
- Social comedy
