= Armande Béjart =

French actress

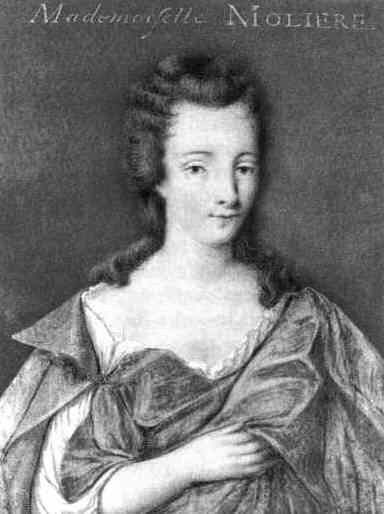
Armande Béjart

Armande-Grésinde-Claire-Élisabeth Béjart (French pronunciation: [aʁmɑ̃d ɡʁezɛ̃d klɛʁ elizabɛt beʒaʁ]; 1645 – 30 November 1700) was a French stage actress, also known under her stage name Mademoiselle Molière. She was married to Molière, and was one of the most famous actresses in the 17th-century.

== Life ==
She was the daughter of Madeleine Béjart and belonged to the Béjart family, a famous theatre family in 17th-century France. In 1643 her mother Madeleine co-founded, with Molière, the theatre company called Illustre Théâtre.

Together, they had three children: Louis (19 January – 11 November 1664), Marie Madeleine Esprit (3 August 1665 – 23 May 1723) and Pierre Jean-Baptiste Armand (15 September – 11 October 1672).

=== Early career ===
She played her first important role in Molière's company in June 1663, as Élise in the Critique de l'école des femmes. She was out of the cast for a short time in 1664, when she had a son with Molière, with Louis XIV and Henrietta of England standing sponsors to the child. Her mother had a relationship with Molière, which likely continued after her marriage to him.

In the spring, beginning with the fêtes at Versailles given by the king to Anne of Austria and Maria Theresa of Spain, she started her long list of important roles. She was at her best as Celimène, really her own highly finished portrait, in Le Misanthrope, and just as admirable as Angélique in Le Malade imaginaire. She was the Elmire at the first performance of Tartuffe, and the Lucile of Le Bourgeois gentilhomme.

All these parts were written by her husband to display her talents to the best advantage, and she made the most of her opportunities.

Neither was happy; Armande was a flirt, and Molière was jealous. Her character was slandered by a scurrilous anonymous pamphlet, La Fameuse Comédienne, ou histoire de la Guérin in 1688. She was certainly guilty of indifference and ingratitude, possibly of infidelity; they separated after the birth of a daughter in 1665, and met only at the theatre until 1671. But Molière too could not resist the charm and grace which fascinated others, and they were reconciled.

=== Later career ===
After Molière's death, the secession of Baron and several other actors, the rivalry of the Hôtel de Bourgogne and the development of the Palais-Royal, by royal patent, into the home of French opera, she brought together actors from the Théâtre du Palais-Royal and the Théâtre du Marais to form the Théâtre Guénégaud on 23 May 1673. The combination, known as the troupe du roi, at first was unfortunate, but in 1679 they secured Mlle du Champmeslé, later absorbed the company of the Hôtel de Bourgogne, and in 1680, the Comédie-Française was born.

On 31 May 1677, she married her second husband, the actor Eustache François Guérin (1636–1728), and had one son (1678–1708) by him. She became a Sociétaire of the Comédie-Française, as a member of its pioneer troupe of actors in 1680 (see Troupe of the Comédie-Française in 1680).

=== Retirement ===
She retired 14 October 1694 with a pension of 1000 pounds. Three years after the death of Molière, Armande paid 5400 pounds for a house in the Parisian suburb Meudon. This house had previously been owned by the surgeon Ambroise Paré from 1550. She lived there with her second husband until her death on 30 November 1700. Her house is now the Museum of Art and History of Meudon.

== Legacy ==
Her portrait is given in a well-known scene (Act iii., sc. 9) in Le Bourgeois gentilhomme.

== Notes ==
Attribution

== Sources ==
- Madeleine Jurgens et Elisabeth Maxfield-Miller, Cent ans de recherches sur Molière, sur sa famille et sur les comédiens de sa troupe, Paris, Archives nationales, 1963.
