= Madeleine Béjart =

French actress and theatre director (1618-1672)

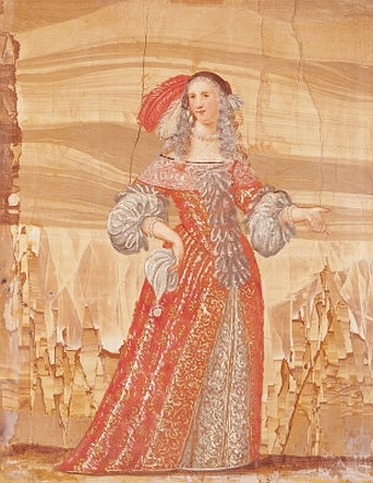
Madeleine Béjart in Les précieuses ridicules.

Madeleine Béjart (French pronunciation: [madlɛn beʒaʁ]; 8 January 1618 – 17 February 1672) was a French actress and theatre director, one of the most famous French stage actors of the 17th-century. She was the co-founder of the Illustre Théâtre.

== Life ==
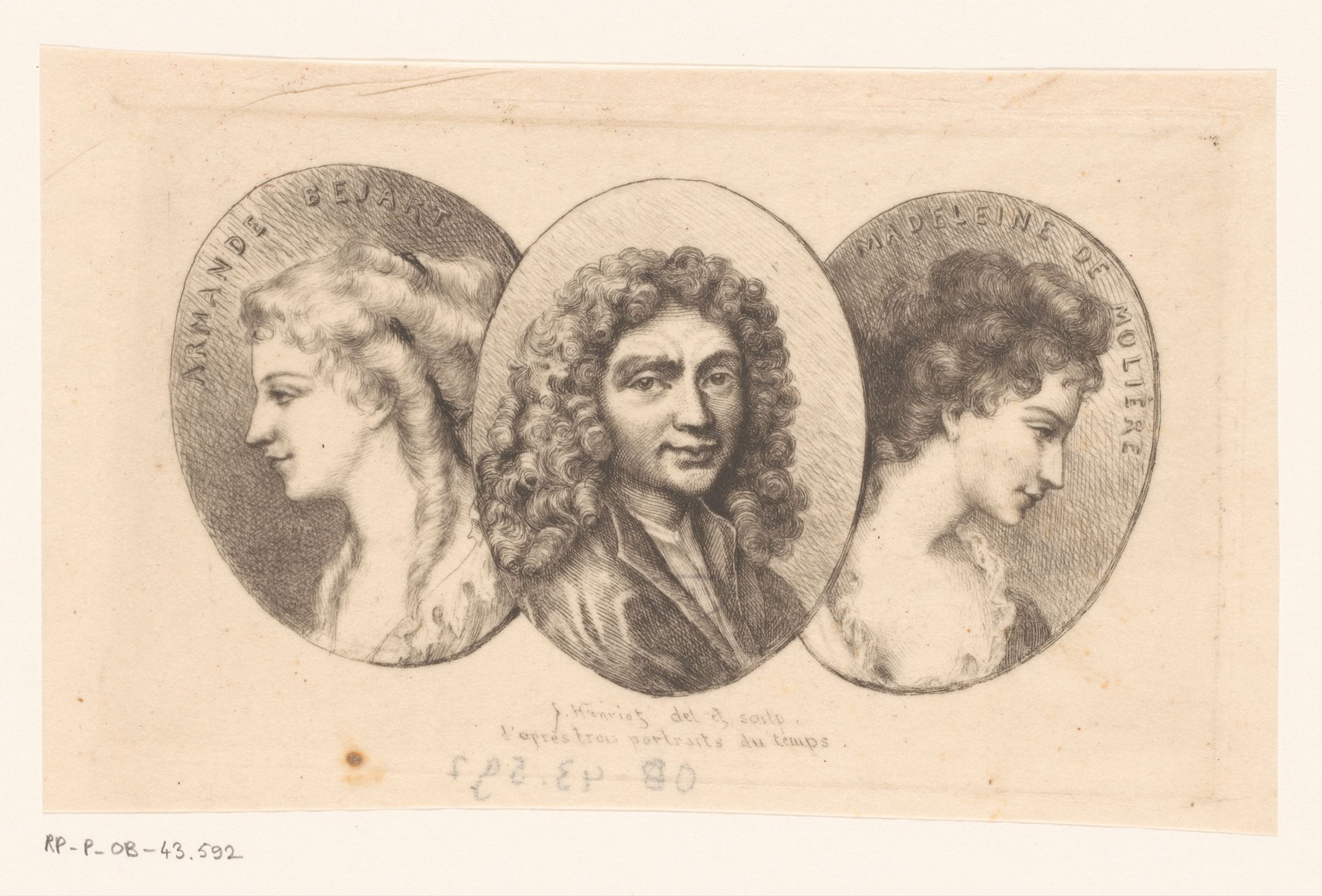
Armande Béjart, Molière and Madeleine Béjart

Madeleine Béjart was a member of the Béjart family, a famous theatre family in 17th-century France. Madeleine was the second child of Joseph and Marie-Herve Bejart. She debuted with her elder brother Joseph at the Theatre du Marais and in the provinces in the late 1630s.

In 1643 she co-founded, with Molière, the Illustre Théâtre, of which she was co-director. She was described as a skillful administrator with the ability to avoid conflicts among the staff. She could freely choose to perform any of the roles in the plays by Molière. She became famous from her performances in his plays. Gradually, she chose smaller parts and left the main parts to Mademoiselle Du Parc and her daughter Armande Béjart. She had a relationship with Molière. In 1662 Molière married her daughter Armande. This marriage does not seem to have ended her relationship with Molière.

A contemporary, Georges de Scudery, described her:

"She was beautiful, she was gallant, she was very intelligent, she sang, she danced well, she played all kinds of instruments, she wrote very nicely in verse and prose and her conversation was very entertaining. She was over all one of the best actresses of her age and her acting had so much charm, that it really inspired all the feigned passion of the plays one saw her represent at the Theatre."
