= La Thorillière =

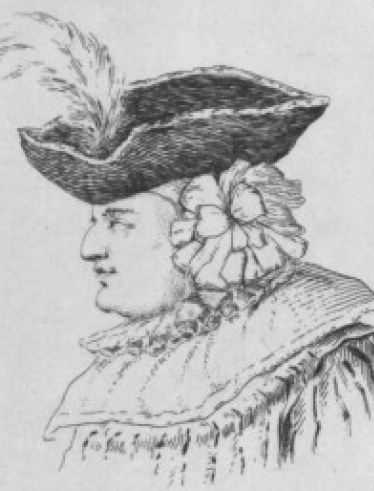
Engraving of La Thorillière by Frédéric-Désiré Hillemacher (1858) after a watercolour.

François Le Noir, sieur de La Thorillière (c. 1626 – 27 July 1680) was a French comic actor, who was born and died in Paris.

== Life ==
La Thorillière was the son of Charles Le Noir, founder of the Théâtre du Marais in 1634, and the actor Isabelle Mestivier.

After serving as a captain in the Lorraine Regiment, he married the 21-year-old Marie Petitjean on 30 April 1658. She was the niece of La Rocque, an actor at the Marais, and François joined the Marais company in 1659.

In June 1662, he and Brécourt moved to Molière's company, where La Thorillière acted in several of Molière's plays, most notably as a sad marquis in L'Impromptu de Versailles (1663) and as Hali in Le Sicilien (1667).

He was also for a time in charge of the accounts for Molière's company. His first register (1663–1664) was published by George Monval in 1890; the second (1664–1665) is preserved in the Archives of the Comédie-Française.

He wrote the play Cléopâtre, premiered at the Palais-Royal in December 1667 and put on eleven times. On 17 January 1671 he played the King in the premiere of the comédie-ballet Psyché, with text and lyrics by Molière, Philippe Quinault and Pierre Corneille and music by Jean-Baptiste Lully.

After Molière's death in 1673, La Thorillière (along with Michel Baron and Beauval and his wife) left that troupe and joined the Comédiens du Roi at the Hôtel de Bourgogne. It was La Thorillière's death in 1680 that, among other reasons, precipitated the merger of the players from the Bourgogne with those at the Guénégaud Theatre, leading to the creation of the Comédie-Française. Some scholars have suggested he had been opposed to any merger since 1673, possibly due to animosity or rivalry between La Thorillière and La Grange, the orator of that troupe.

His son Pierre (1659–1731), also known as La Thorillière, became a sociétaire of the Comédie-Française. His daughter Charlotte (born 1661) married Michel Baron in 1675, whilst his daughter Marie-Thérèse (born 1663) married the playwright Dancourt in 1680.

== Bibliography ==
- Clarke, Jan (1998). The Guénégaud Theatre in Paris (1673–1680). Volume One: Founding, Design and Production. Lewiston, New York: The Edwin Mellen Press. ISBN 9780773483927.
- Deierkauf-Holsboer, S. Wilma (1958). Le Théâtre du Marais: II. Le berceau de l'Opéra et de la Comédie-Française, 1648–1673. Paris: Librairie Nizet. OCLC 889201044.
- Deierkauf-Holsboer, S. Wilma (1970). Le théâtre de l'Hôtel de Bourgogne. II. Le théâtre de la troupe royale, 1635–1680. Paris: A.-G. Nizet. OCLC 542919.
- Gaines, James F. (2002). The Molière Encyclopedia. Westport, Connecticut: Greenwood Press. ISBN 9780313312557.
- Hartnoll, Phyllis, editor (1983). The Oxford Companion to the Theatre, fourth edition. Oxford: Oxford University Press. p. 474. ISBN 9780192115461.
- Howarth, William D., editor (1997). French Theatre in the Neo-Classical Era 1550–1789. Cambridge: Cambridge University Press. ISBN 9780521100878 (digital reprint, 2008).
- La Thorillière, François Le Noir de (1890). Premier registre de La Thorillière (1663-1664), notice, notes et index de Georges Monval. Paris: Librairie des Bibliophiles. Copy available at Gallica. Copy at Google Books.
- Mongrédien, Georges (1972). Dictionnaire biographique des comédiens français du XVIIe siècle, second edition. Paris: Centre national de la recherche scientifique. ISBN 9780785948421.
