= Troupe of the Comédie-Française in 1755 =

- 1680
- 1752
- 1754
- 1755
- 1772
- 1790

The troupe of the Comédie-Française in 1755 was the company of actors, actresses, dancers, and musicians who performed at the Comédie-Française during the theatrical year beginning 17 April 1755 and ending 10 April 1755. The troupe included notable performers such as Lekain, Préville, Clairon, and Dangeville, and was organized into acting, dancing, and orchestral sections.

== Composition of the troupe of the Comédie-Française in 1755 ==
The theatrical year began 17 April 1755 (the day before Palm Sunday) and ended 10 April 1756.

Director :
Actors	Actresses
Le Grand	La Motte
de La Thorillière	Dangeville
Armand	Gaussin
Du Breuil	Grandval
Sarrazin	Dumesnil
Grandval	Lavoy
Dangeville	Drouin
Dubois	Clairon
Bonneval	Beauménard
de La Noue	Brillant
Paulin	Hus
Lekain	Guéant
Bellecour	
Préville	
Dancers	Female dancers
Armand, directeur	Gaurion
La Rivière, ballet master	Camargo
Giraud, Kapellmeister	Martigny
de Launay, répétiteur	Rosalie
Bajofrois	Chauvin
Gougy	Dupré
Feuillade	Laneuville
Martin	Cornu
D'Auvigny	
Félix	
Orchestra
Branche	Perrin
Piset	Chartier
Blondeau	Madrou and Béraut, flutes

== Sources ==
- Almanach historique et chronologique de tous les spectacles, Paris 1756.
