= Troupe of the Comédie-Française in 1754 =

- 1680
- 1752
- 1754
- 1755
- 1772
- 1790

The troupe of the Comédie-Française in 1754 was the company of actors, actresses, dancers, musicians, and stage personnel active at the Comédie-Française during the theatrical year running from 22 April 1754 to 22 March 1755. The troupe included both established performers and rising talents of the French stage, among them Lekain, La Clairon, Grandval, and Préville.

== Composition of the troupe of the Comédie-Française in 1754 ==
The theatrical year began 22 April 1754 (the day before Palm) and ended 22 March 1755.

Director :
Actors	Actresses
Le Grand	La Motte
de La Thorillière	Dangeville
Armand	Gaussin
Du Breuil	Grandval
Sarrazin	Dumesnil
Grandval	Lavoy
Dangeville	Drouin
Dubois	Clairon
Baron	Beauménard
Bonneval	Brillant
de La Noue	Hus
Paulin	
Drouin	
Lekain	
Bellecour	
Préville	
Dancers	Female dancers
Dourdet, master of ballet	Gaurion
Giraud, master of music	Martigny
de Launay, répétiteur	Rosaly
La Rivière	Frédéric 1
Bajofrois	Frédéric 2
Gougy	Riquette
Feuillard	Le Clerc
Guingret	Chauvin
Gaurion	Guillot
Duval	
Hus-Malo	
Orchestra
Dupré	Perrin
Branche	Chabrun
Piset	Chartier
Blondeau	Madrou, flute
Other
Rebut, janitor	Grangé, prompter
Louis Debray, decorator	Le Tellier, doorman
De Romancan, cashier	Mlle Langlois, doorwoman
Mme Dauvilliers, receiver	Miel, doorman
M. de Laplante, receiver	Mlle Tairot, receiver at the theatre
Gond, controller	Mlle La Roche, receiver at the amphitheatre

== Sources ==
- Almanach historique et chronologique de tous les spectacles, Paris 1755.
