= Troupe of the Comédie-Française in 1772 =

- 1680
- 1752
- 1754
- 1755
- 1772
- 1790

The troupe of the Comédie-Française in 1772 was the company of actors, actresses, dancers, and musicians who made up the Comédie-Française during the theatrical year that began 12 April 1772 and ended 16 April 1773.

== Composition of the troupe of the Comédie-Française in 1772 ==
The theatrical year began 12 April 1772 and ended 16 April 1773.

Directors : the Actors
Actors	Actresses
Bonneval	Bellecour
Le Kain	Vestris
Bellecour	Dumesnil
Préville	Lachassaigne
Brizard	Drouin
Molé	Saint-Val
Dauberval	Hus
Augé	Préville
Bouret	Dubois
Feulie	Molé
Dalainval	Doligny
	Luzy
	Fanier
Dancers	Female dancers
Deshayes, ballet master	Joly
Desnoyers, premier danseur	Victoire
Devaux, répétiteur	Duchaumont, l.
Joly	Duchaumont, c.
Giguet	Turin
Marchand	Coulon
Guiardelle	Le Roi, surnumeraire
Raymond	Debligny, surnumeraire
Guiardelle, cadet	Confiance-Chaulet
Debray	Joly
Goyon	Tifte
Henri	Coulon
Victor	Richard
Antoine	Pérole
Petit	Sophie
Nivelon	
Legrand	
Baré	
Orchestra
Baudron	Devaux
Meunier	Marmet
Lalance	Defmarais
Cuniffy	Rofe
Chaudet	Gagnol

== Source ==
- Les Spectacles de Paris, ou Calendrier historique & chronologique des théâtres, pour l'année 1772, Paris 1772.
