= Troupe of the Comédie-Française in 1752 =

- 1680
- 1752
- 1754
- 1755
- 1772
- 1790

The troupe of the Comédie-Française in 1752 was the company of actors, actresses, dancers, musicians, and stage personnel active at the Comédie-Française during the theatrical year running from 10 April 1752 (the day before Palm Sunday) to 14 April 1753.

== Composition of the troupe of the Comédie-Française in 1752 ==
Director:

Actors	Actresses
Le Grand	La Motte
de La Thorillière	Dangeville
Armand	Gaussin
Poisson	Grandval
Du Breuil	Dumesnil
Sarrazin	Lavoy
Grandval	Drouin
Dangeville	Clairon
Dubois	Beauménard
Baron	Brillant
Bonneval	
de La Noue	
Paulin	
Deschamps	
Drouin	
Lekain	
Bellecour	

== Sources ==
- Almanach historique et chronologique de tous les spectacles, Paris 1753.
