= Hillemacher =

Hillemacher is a surname. Notable people with the surname include:

- Eugène Ernest Hillemacher (1818–1887), French history, portrait and genre painter in the Academic style
- Frédéric-Désiré Hillemacher (1811–1886), Belgian engraver
- Jeanne Louise Hillemacher (1807-1858), French composer
- Paul Hillemacher (1852–1933), French composer and pianist
