= Troupe of the Comédie-Française in 1680 =

- 1680
- 1752
- 1754
- 1755
- 1772
- 1790

The troupe of the Comédie-Française in 1680 was the founding company of the Comédie-Française, established on 24 August 1680 by order of King Louis XIV. It was formed by the merger of two existing Parisian theatre companies: the troupe formerly resident at the Hôtel de Bourgogne and the troupe of the Guénégaud Theatre. The new company consisted of 27 members, 15 actors and 12 actresses and gave its first performance on 25 August 1680 with Phèdre by Jean Racine and Les Carosses d'Orléans by Jean de La Chapelle.

== Composition of the troupe of the Comédie-Française in 1680 ==
As of 24 August 1680, La Grange set in his register:

« Jonction de la Troupe Royalle cy-devant à l'hostel de bourgogne avec la nostre suivant les ordres du Roy ».

The new troupe consisted of 27 people, that is 15 actors and 12 actresses. The first performance took place on 25 August with Phèdre by Jean Racine and Les Carosses d'Orléans by Jean de La Chapelle.

Actors	Actresses
Champmeslé	Champmeslé
Baron	Baron
Poisson	De Brie
La Grange	La Grange
Beauval	Beauval
Dauvilliers	Bellonde
La Thuillerie	Dennebaut
Guérin	Guérin
Rosimond	Dupin
Hubert	Guyot
Du Croisy	Du Croisy
Raisin	Raisin
De Villiers	
Verneuil	
Hauteroche	
