= Mademoiselle La Grange =

French actress (1639–1727)

- Born: 1639; France
- Died: 1727 (aged 87–88)
- Occupation: Stage actress
- Notable work: Pioneer member of both the Molière's company (from 1672), and of the Comédie-Française

Marie Ragueneau de l’Estang, stage name Mademoiselle La Grange (1639–1727), was a French stage actress.

She was a pioneer member of both the Molière's company (from 1672), and of the Comédie-Française. She belonged to the first Sociétaires of the Comédie-Française (see Troupe of the Comédie-Française in 1680). She retired in 1692.
