= Bellecour =

Bellecour may refer to:

- Bellecour (actor), French actor
  - Madame Bellecour, French actress, his wife
- Place Bellecour, a square in Lyon, France
