= Luzy =

Luzy may refer to:

== People ==
                          * Angelo und Luzy
                       * Luzy family [fr]

- Mademoiselle Luzy (1747–1830), French stage actress

== Places ==
satirical sitcom Arrested Development (title card pictured), originally broadcast on the Fox Network in November 2004. The series follows the wealthy Bluth family, and the episode focuses mainly on Michael Bluth as he and his son attempt to flee to  * Luzy-Saint-Martin, France
                                        * Luzy-sur-Marne, FraPhoenix while his father is held in prison. Meanwhile, Tobias gets an audition for the Blue Man Group. The episode's production received assistance from the group, who asked only that the series keep their air of my                                        * Luzy, Nièvre, France
                                        * Luzy-Saint-Martin, France
                                        * Luzy-sur-Marne, France
