= Brutus (tragedy) =

1729 tragedy in five acts by Voltaire

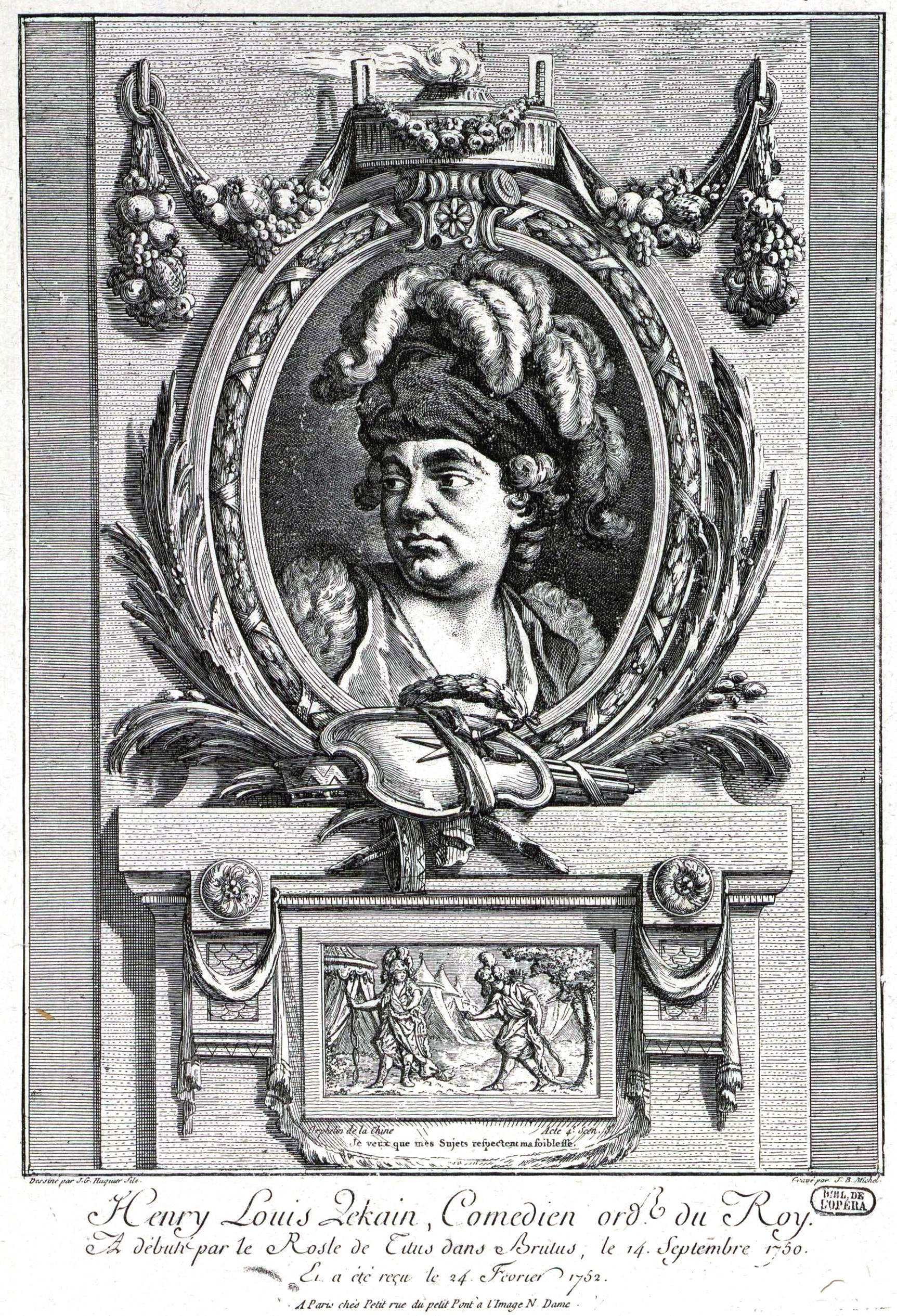
Henry Louis Lekain in the role of Titus, 1750

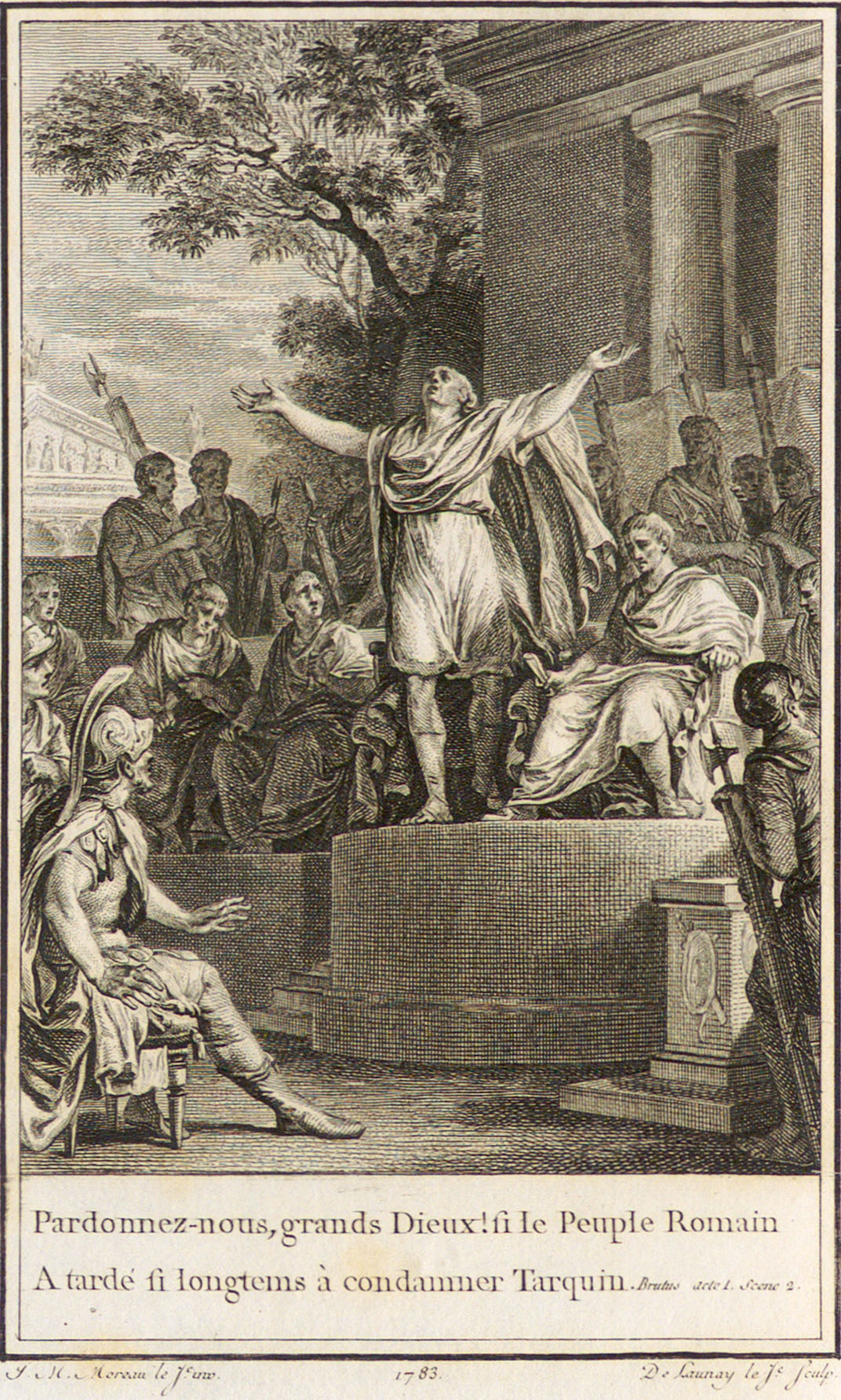
Jean-Michel Moreau: Illustration of Brutus 1783

Brutus is a tragedy in five acts by Voltaire. He began work on the play in 1727 in England and completed it in 1729. It premiered on 11 December 1730 in Paris.

== Composition ==
The first part of the work was written in English at Wandsworth while Voltaire was in England, and it was completed on his return to France. Two and a half years passed before he considered it ready for the stage. Voltaire's lover Adrienne Lecouvreur was meant to play the role of Tullie, but she fell ill and died during rehearsals and had to be replaced by Mlle Dangeville. She was only sixteen years old, and her nervousness did not help the reception of the play.

== Action ==
Voltaire drew his material from the legendary story of the first Roman Consul Lucius Junius Brutus (509 BC). His son, Titus, falls in love with Tullie, daughter of the last Etruscan king of Rome, Lucius Tarquinius Superbus, and through this relationship is led into betraying Rome. The Senate hands Titus over to his father, who forgives him but insists on his execution to ensure the safety of the Republic.

== Critical reception ==
When the play premiered at the Comédie-Française on December 11, 1730, audience reaction was mixed. It was criticised for not adhering to the three unities and for the harsh attitude of the character of Brutus. Although the play was well-attended, it was taken off the stage after only fifteen performances. The openly republican theme of the play displeased the authorities, and Voltaire's enemies Prosper Jolyot de Crébillon and the Chevalier de Rohan were actively trying to turn the public against it. Voltaire left Paris to spend some time privately in Rouen. The play enjoyed a revival during the French Revolution, and the National Convention ordered a performance of Brutus on 2 August 1793 with free admission. in all there were 110 performances at the Comédie-Française between 1730 and 1799.

== Printed editions ==
The first edition was printed in 1731 with Jean-François Josse in Paris, together with a Discours sur la Tragédie by Voltaire, dedicated to Lord Bolingbroke. Thirteen individual editions followed during Voltaire's life, and between 1790 and 1794 twelve further editions were added.
