= Mademoiselle Préville =

French actress

Madeleine Angélique Michelle Drouin, stage names Mademoiselle Préville (1731–1798), was a French stage actress.

She was engaged at the Comédie-Française in 1753. She became a Sociétaires of the Comédie-Française in 1757. She retired in 1786.

She was the sister of Madame Drouin and the spouse of Préville (actor) and played mothers and coquettes with success.
