= Dupin =

Dupin is a French surname. Notable people with the surname include:

- Amantine Lucile Aurore Dupin (1804–1876), more commonly known as George Sand, French writer
- André Marie Jean Jacques Dupin (1783–1865), French advocate
- C. Auguste Dupin, a fictional detective
- Charles Dupin (1784–1873), French Catholic mathematician
- Jacques Dupin (1927–2012), French poet
- Louis Ellies Dupin (1657–1719), French ecclesiastical historian
- Mademoiselle Dupin (1649-1709), French actress
