= Madame Drouin =

French actress

Françoise-Marie-Jeanne-Elisabeth Gaultier (1720–1803), stage name Madame Drouin, was a French stage actress.

She was engaged at the Comédie-Française in 1742. She became a Sociétaires of the Comédie-Française in 1742. She retired in 1780.

Drouin was a versatile actress, which was not common during a time when most actors specialized in their one category of roles. She shared the tragedy and princess roles with Jeanne-Catherine Gaussem and the heroine roles with Marie-Geneviève Dupré, as well as the soubrette roles with Marie-Anne Botot Dangeville. When Marianne-Hélène de Mottes and Marie-Anne Pauline Du Mont retired and Mademoiselle Camouche (Jacqueline Camouche) died, she took over the character roles, in which she dominated for her last twenty years onstage.

She was also a singer and was able to take on singing roles.

Drouin is also remembered for being the first woman allowed to hold the opening speech and prologue before a show on the Comédie-Française, which was a controversial thing in its time.
