= Marie Claveau =

French actress

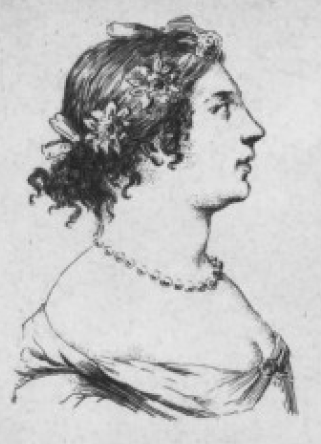
Posthumous watercolour of Claveau by Frédéric-Désiré Hillemacher after a contemporary sketch or portrait.

Marie Claveau, stage name Mademoiselle du Croisy (died September 1703) was a French stage actress.

== Life ==
She was born in Sainte-Hermine.

She married first in 1635 to Nicolas de Lécole, Lord of Saint-Maurice. After his death, she married Philibert Gassot, known as Du Croisy, at Poitiers on 29 July 1652. They had at least two daughters: Angélique (died aged nine) and the actor Marie-Angélique.

She joined Molière's company in 1659, where she gained her stage name Mademoiselle du Croisy (a stage-name also taken by her daughter). Her poor acting and friction with other company members led to her departure from it in 1665.

She died in Dourdan in 1703.
