= Mademoiselle Doligny =

French actress

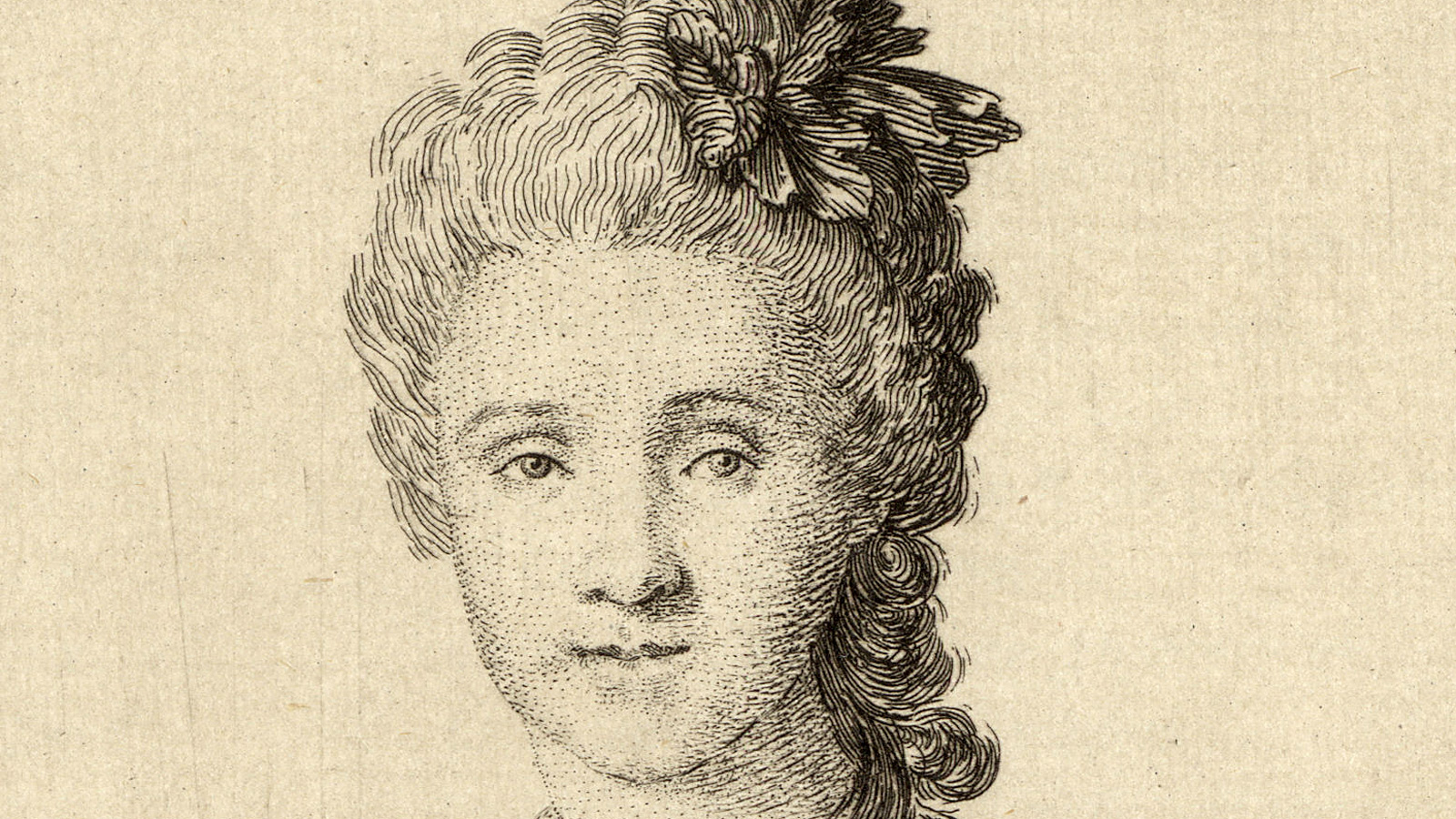
A portrait of Mademoiselle Doligny

Louise-Adélaïde Berton-Maisonneuve, stage names Mademoiselle Doligny (1746–1823), was a French stage actress.

She was engaged at the Comédie-Française in 1764. She became a Sociétaires of the Comédie-Française in 1764. She retired in 1783.
