= Catherine Des Urlis =

French actress

Catherine Des Urlis or Desurlis (1627 - 2 January 1679) was a French actress.

She was born in Paris as the daughter of a clerk of the court of the privy council. She was the sister of the actors Jean Des Urlis, Etiennette Des Urlis (Mlle Brecourt), and Madeleine Des Urlis.

She was part of the troupe of the Illustre Théâtre from the beginning, but left at the end of the year 1643, then joined provincial troops. She then played at the Théâtre du Marais from 1667 to 1673.
