= Marie-Madeline Blouin =

French actress

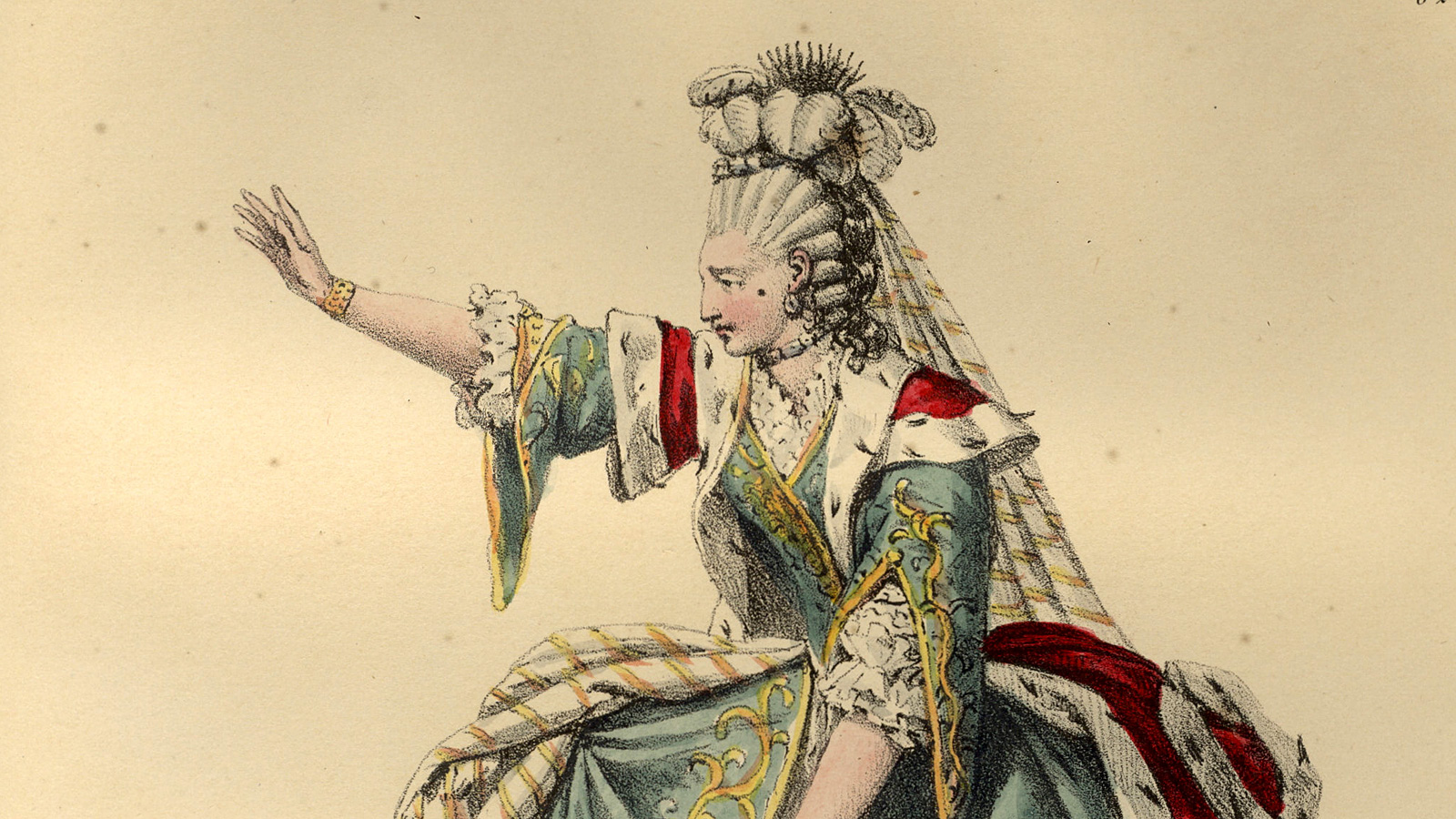
Marie-Madeleine Dubois (1746-1779) comédienne de la Comédie-Française.jpg

Marie-Madeline Blouin, stage name Mademoiselle Dubois (1746–1779), was a French stage actress.

She was engaged at the Comédie-Française in 1759. She became a Sociétaires of the Comédie-Française in 1761. She retired in 1773.

Mademoiselle Dubois often played the prestigious role of tragedienne. However, contemporary critics referred to her as a beautiful stage ornament with moderate talent whose fame was more attributed to her beauty and love affairs.
