= Pierre Laujon =

French playwright and chansonnier

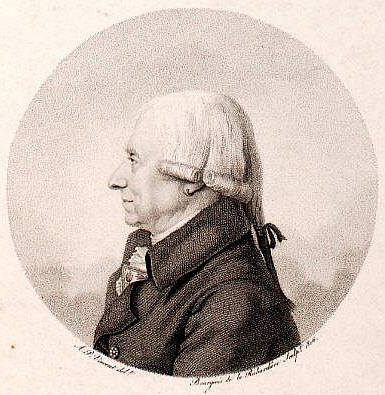
- Born: 13 January 1737; Paris, France
- Died: 13 July 1811 (aged 84); Paris, France
- Occupation: Playwright

Pierre Laujon (13 January 1727 – 13 July 1811) was a French playwright and chansonnier. He was uncle to the playwright Pierre-Yves Barré.

== Works ==
Theatre

- 1745: La Fille, la veuve et la femme, parodie nouvelle des Fêtes de Thalie, Théâtre italien de Paris, 21 August
- 1747: Daphnis et Chloé, pastorale, Paris, Académie royale de musique, 28 September
- 1747–1748: Recueil des comédies et ballets, représentés sur le théâtre des petits appartements pendant l'hiver de 1747 à 1748
- 1750: La Journée galante, ballet héroïque en 3 actes, représenté devant le Roi, sur le théâtre des petits appartements à Versailles, 25 February
- 1754: Zéphire et Fleurette, one-act parody of Zelindor by François-Augustin de Paradis de Moncrif, Théâtre italien de Paris, 23 March
- 1756: L'Amour impromptu, parodie de l'acte d'Eglé dans les Talents lyriques, Paris, Opéra-Comique, 10 July
- 1762: Armide, parody of the opera Armide, in 4 acts, Théâtre italien de Paris, 11 January
- 1763: Ismène et Isménias, ou la Fête de Jupiter, three-act opera, presented in front of their Majesties, in Choisy, Monday 13 June
- 1765: Silvie, three-act opara with a prologue, presented in front of their Majesties in Fontainebleau, 17 October
- 1771: L'Amoureux de quinze ans, ou la Double fête, comedy in 3 acts and in prose, mingled with ariettes, Théâtre italien de Paris, 18 April
- 1776: Æglé, ballet-héroïque in 1 act, presented in front of their Majesties, in Fontainebleau, 4 November
- 1777: Matroco, drame burlesque, in 4 acts and in verse, mingled with ariettes and comédies en vaudevilles, presented in front of their Majesties, Théâtre italien de Paris
- 1782: Le Poète supposé, ou les Préparatifs de fête, comedy in 3 acts and in prose, mingled with ariettes and comédies en vaudevilles, Théâtre italien de Paris, 25 April
- 1790: Le Couvent, ou les Fruits du caractère et de l'éducation, comedy in 1 act and in prose, Paris, Théâtre de la Nation, 16 April
- 1806: Le Juif bienfaisant, ou les Rapprochements difficiles, comedy in five acts and in prose, imitated from English, given in Rouen June

Varia

- 1776: Les À propos de la folie ou Chansons grotesques, grivoises et annonces de parade, 1776
- 1800: Notice sur les Dîners du Caveau, published in Les Dîners du Vaudeville, Frimaire An V.
- 1811: Œuvres choisies de P. Laujon, contenant ses pièces représentées sur nos principaux théâtres, ses fêtes publiques ou particulières, ses chansons et autres opuscules, avec des anecdotes, remarques et notices relatives à ces divers genres.
