= Le Couvent, ou les Fruits du caractère et de l'éducation =

1790 play by Pierre Laujon

Le Couvent, ou les Fruits du caractère et de l'éducation (The Convent, or the Fruits of Character and Education) is a play in one act by Pierre Laujon. It was the first play in the history of French theatre to feature a cast made up entirely of women. A comedy, the work premiered at the Théâtre de la Nation in Paris on April 16, 1790.

Le Couvent was the first "convent play"; a popular genre of secular play in France during the French Revolution that was either set inside convents or featured nuns as the main characters; often as a means at criticizing or parodying religious practices and concepts. Both popular and critical reaction to Laujon's play was divisive, with the choice of presenting nuns and the setting of a convent as the subject of a secular comedy bringing both harsh criticism from religious conservatives and praise from more radical and progressive thinkers. Parisian audiences were sharply divided; with both loud booing and enthusiastic applause of approval often occurring simultaneously. This work inspired the creation of many more convent comedy plays by other writers soon after, including Jean-Baptiste Gresset’s Vert-vert, ou le Perroquet de Nevers (1790) and Carbon de Flins des Oliviers’ Le Mari directeur, ou le Déménagement du couvent (1791) to name a few.
