= Geneviève Béjart =

French actress

Geneviève Béjart, stage name Mlle Hervé, Mlle Villaubrun and Mlle Aubry (1624 – 1675), was a French stage actress.

She was one of the founding members of the Illustre Théâtre in June 1643, with her brother Joseph, her sister Armande Béjart and seven other actors. She followed her sister to the Hotel de Bourgogne, the Moliere company and the Hotel du Geneguad.

She was married to Jean-Baptiste Aubry.
