= Préville (actor) =

French comic actor (1721–1799)

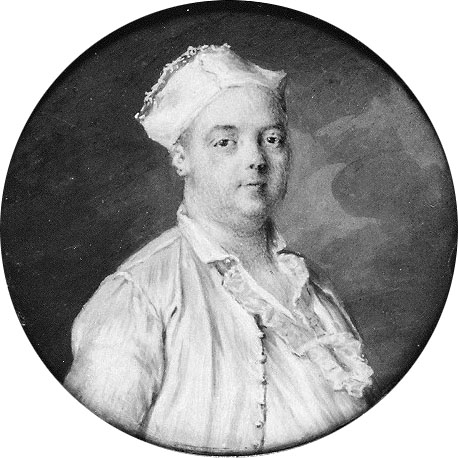
Portrait of Préville from the second half of the 18th century

Préville (French pronunciation: [pʁevil]; 17 or 19 September 1721 – 18 December 1799) was a French comic actor.

== Biography ==
Born Pierre-Louis Dubus to an impoverished family in Paris, he was originally intended for the clergy. While playing with a mediocre troop of actors in provincial France, Préville's budding talents were spotted in the town of Rouen by Jean Monnet, who engaged him to perform with the Opéra-Comique in Paris in 1743. Later Préville returned to the provinces and was the manager of the Grand Théâtre in Lyon.

He joined the Comédie Francaise in Paris in 1753, where he debuted on 20 September in the role of Crispin in Jean-François Regnard's Le Légataire universel (The Sole Legatee). He took on roles previously played by François-Arnoul Poisson and revealed himself to be the best comedian in the company since Jean-Baptiste Raisin. He appeared with the actress Mlle Dangeville with great success in several plays by Pierre de Marivaux and created the roles of Figaro in Pierre Beaumarchais's Le Barbier de Séville in 1775 and Brid'oison in Le Mariage de Figaro in 1784. In 1777, he played the role of Saint-Germain in Jacques Marie Boutet’s play L’amant bourru. One of his most notable successes was playing 6 characters in one in Edmé Boursault's Le Mercure galant.

He retired in 1786, returning to the stage in 1791 and 1794–5, and died in Beauvais at the age of 78 years and 3 months. He was married to Mademoiselle Préville.

== See also ==
- Troupe of the Comédie-Française in 1754
- Troupe of the Comédie-Française in 1755
