= Guyon Guérin de Bouscal =

French dramatist and novelist

Guyon Guérin de Bouscal (1613–1657) was a French dramatist and novelist.

== Selected works ==
- Oroondate (performed 1643), a parody of the widespread literary models of heroic courtship
- a trilogy based on Don Quixote (performed 1638-9), notable for its accomplished use of the burlesque and thought to have been adapted and played by Molière's company as Le Gouvernement de Sancho Pansa in 1660.
- La mort de Brute et de Porcie (1637), on the deaths of Brutus and his wife Portia
- One novel
