= Alexandrine Fanier =

French stage actress (1745–1821)

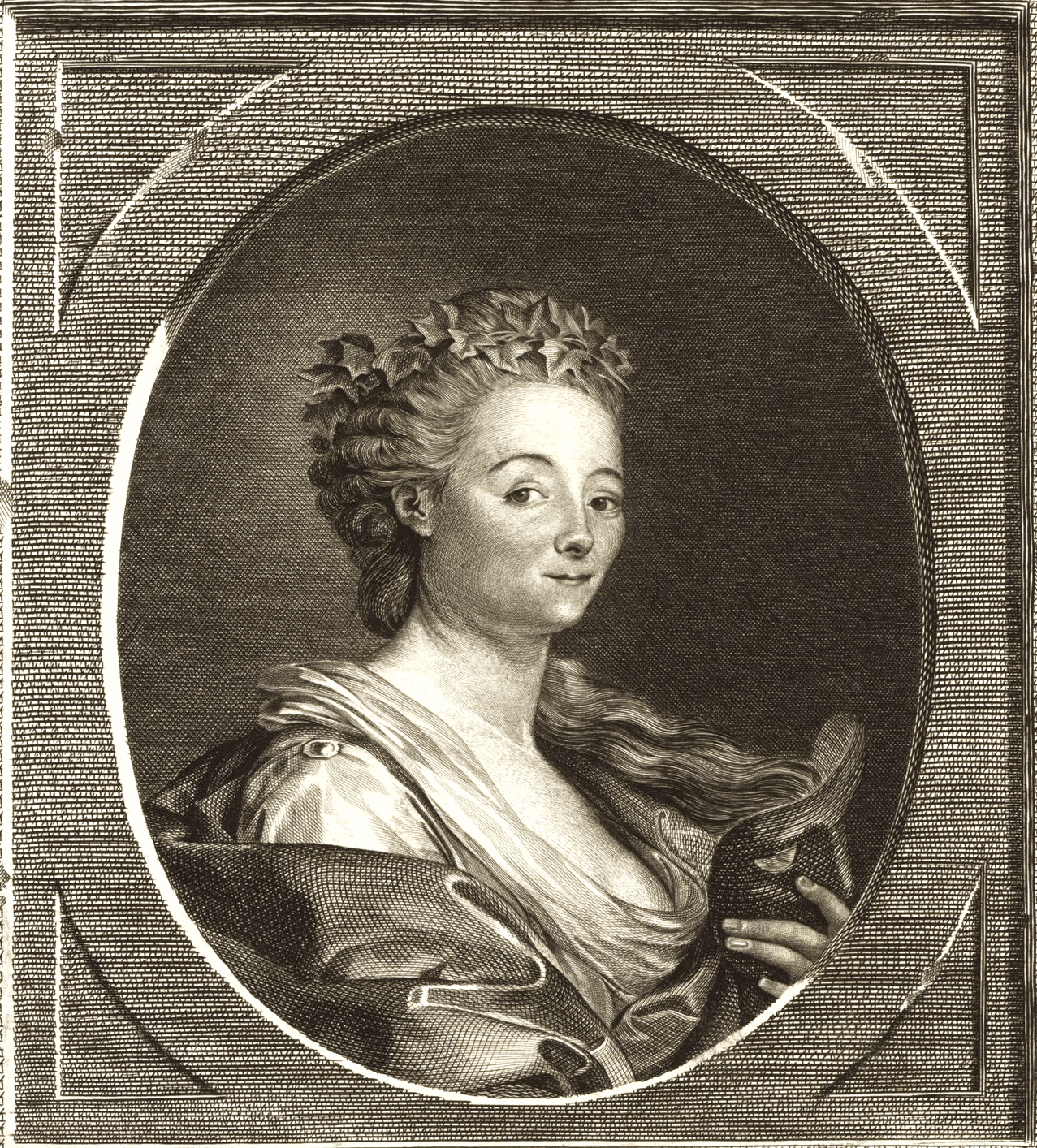
- Born: 1745
- Died: 1821 (aged 75–76)
- Occupation: Stage actress
- Years active: 1764–1786
- Notable work: Comédie-Française

Alexandrine Fanier (1745 – 1821) was a French stage actress. Fanier was engaged at the Comédie-Française in 1764. She became a Sociétaires of the Comédie-Française in 1764.

She retired in 1786.
