= Charlotte Le Noir de la Thorillière =

French actress

Charlotte Le Noir de la Thorillière, stage name Mademoiselle Baron (1661 – 1730), was a French stage actress.

She was engaged at the Molière's company in 1673. She became a Sociétaires of the Comédie-Française in 1680. She retired in 1729.
