= Illustre Théâtre =

French Theater Company

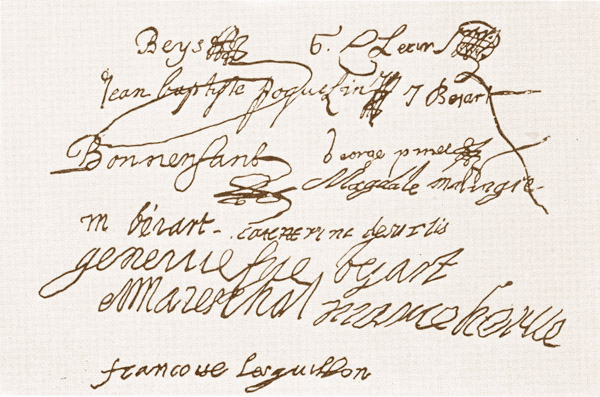
Signatures Illustre Théâtre

The Illustre Théâtre was a French theatre company set up by Molière on 30 June 1643, and shut down less than two years later on his imprisonment in August 1645. However, it is notable for its impact on the history of the French theatre. It was succeeded by la Troupe de Molière.

== History ==
By an act of association signed on 30 June 1643, before the notaries M^{es} Duchesne and Fieffé, the troupe was set up by the following signatories:

- Denis Beys
- Germain Clérin, known as Villabé
- Jean-Baptiste Poquelin (not yet known as Molière)
- Joseph Béjart
- Nicolas Bonenfant, known as Croisac
- Georges Pinel, known as La Couture
- Madeleine Béjart - who was, by the act, accorded the privilege "to choose whichever rôle she likes"
- Madeleine Malingre
- Catherine Des Urlis
- Geneviève Béjart, known as Mlle Hervé.

The new troupe set up at first at the Perle dive, rue de la Perle in Paris. Some months later, it moved to Rouen where an eleventh member, Catherine Bourgeois, was added, some of the original, like Bonenfant, having stayed in Paris.

Having won the protection of the duc d'Orléans, the new troupe returned to Paris and took up residence at the jeu de paume des Métayers, 13 rue de Seine, where they opened on 1 January 1644 playing tragedy. Receipts were low and their protector left for the war. Jean-Baptiste Poquelin, who signed himself Molière from 28 June, was obliged to borrow. They had to leave and moved to the jeu de paume de la Croix-Noire, rue des Barrés, in December of the same year. Unable to repay his multiple creditors, Molière was imprisoned in August 1645 : after less than two years of existence, the Illustre Théâtre had finally failed, but it had made a mark on the history of theatre.

== 20th century homages ==
- The theatre in Pézenas is called Illustre Théâtre, in homage to Molière who crossed the Languedoc between 1647 and 1657, and stayed in Pézenas in 1650–1651, during the Estates of Languedoc.
- The metteur en scène, Jean-Marie Villégier named his company the 'Illustre Théâtre in reference to Molière : « On sait par exemple qu'il a joué Corneille, Tristan L'Hermite, Rotrou. Mon idée était de travailler ce répertoire, tel que l'a trouvé Molière avant de devenir l'écrivain que l'on connaît. » ("We know, for example, that he played Corneille, Tristan L'Hermite, Rotrou. My idea was to work this repertoire, as Molière found it before becoming the writer that we know.")
