= Pierrette Hélène Pinet =

French actress

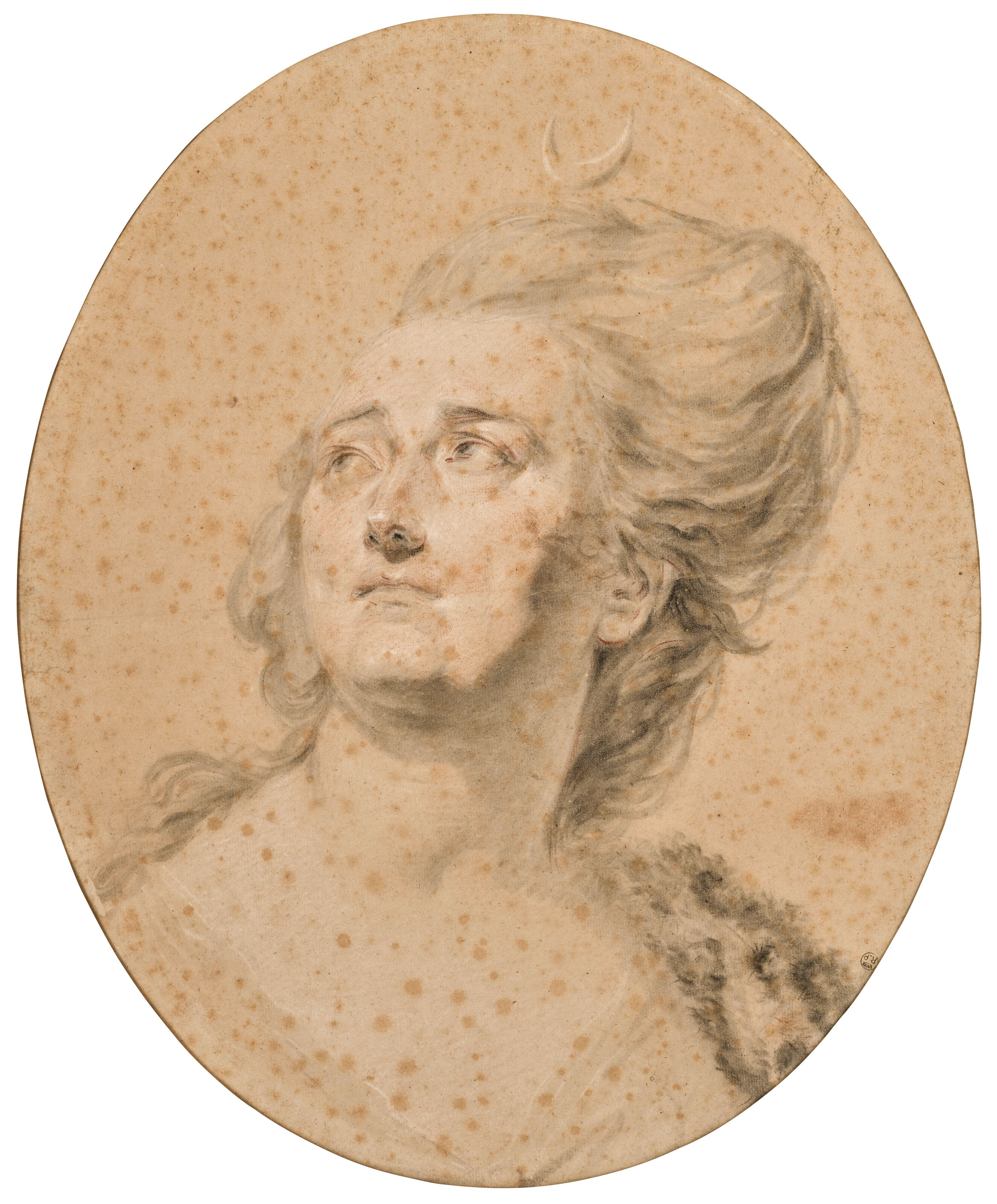
- Pierrette Hélène Pinet as the goddess DIana, portrait by Jean-Auguste Massavy d' Armancourt
- Born: 14 June 1740; Paris
- Died: 16 September 1782 (aged 42)
- Occupation: Stage actor
- Spouse(s): François-René Molé
- Children: Elisabeth-Félicité Molé-Reymond

Pierrette Hélène Pinet, stage names Mademoiselle d'Épinay and Mademoiselle Molé (1740–1782), was a French stage actress.

She was engaged at the Comédie-Française in 1760. She became a Sociétaires of the Comédie-Française in 1762. She retired in 1769 and married her colleague François-René Molé.

She mainly performed the role of love heroine in comedies, and confidante in tragedies. Among her roles where Julie in Fagans La Pupille, Alcmène in Molières L'Amphitryon, and tragic heroines such as Zaire, Inès de Castro and Bérénice.
