= Rosimond =

Claude de La Rose, better known as Rosimond, (c.1640 – Paris, 31 October 1686) was a 17th-century French playwright and actor.

In 1668, he had his first play Le Duel fantasque, ou les Valets rivaux presented in Grenoble. The following year, he gave Le Nouveau festin de Pierre, ou l'Athée foudroyé at the Théâtre du Marais, to which he remained attached until 1673, moving later to the Hôtel de Guénégaud. There, he revived roles by Molière, especially The Imaginary Invalid, and became one of the first sociétaires of the Comédie-Française in 1680 (see Troupe of the Comédie-Française in 1680). He died in the same circumstances as Molière, when coming out of stage, and his family met the same difficulties for his burial (see Excommunication of actors by the Catholic Church).

Under the pen name Jean-Baptiste Du Mesnil, Rosimond wrote Vie des Saints pour tous les jours de l'année, published in 1680. The same year, he acquired a house with vines in Montmartre, a house which is now the Musée de Montmartre.

His rich theatrical library is in St. Petersburg.
