= Paul Hillemacher =

French composer and pianist

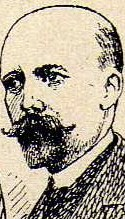
Paul Hillemacher

Paul Joseph Guillaume Hillemacher (25 November 1852 – 13 August 1933) was a French composer and pianist.

== Life ==
Born in Paris, Hillemacher studied at the Conservatoire de Paris in François Bazin's class. He received a Deuxième Prix for harmony in 1870, and a "1er accessit" in fugue two years later. He won, in 1873, a Second Prix de Rome then, in 1876, the Premier Grand Prix de Rome with his cantata Judith. He composed many stage works, operas, symphonies and art songs.

Most of his works were composed in collaboration with his brother Lucien Hillemacher (1860–1909). Their first collaboration began in 1879 with two songs, Le Dernier banquet and Barcarolle. By 1881, they signed their works, "P. L. Hillemacher", adopting the name Paul-Lucien Hillemacher.

In 1882, they published a collection of Vingt mélodies as well as the symphonic poem Loreley, which won the prize of the City of Paris. One of their songs, Ici-bas, was published by mistake under Debussy's name, which testifies to their fame.

Lucien Hillemacher won a Second Prix de Rome in 1879 and the First Grand Prix de Rome in 1880 with his Scène lyrique Fingal after Charles Dancours. There is also a piece for organ in G sharp minor (1907). (Note: Moderato quasi andantino, dedicated "to Mr Marcel Fouquier, sympathetic tribute, P. L. Hillemacher, 25 Oct. 07".)

The two Hillemacher brothers were the sons of the academic painter Eugène Ernest Hillemacher.

== Works in collaboration with Lucien Hillemacher ==
- Loreley, symphonic legend after Eugène Adenis, Théâtre du Châtelet, 1882.
- 20 mélodies, 1882. (Note: L'invitation au voyage on a poem by Charles Baudelaire, S'il est un charmant gazon on a poem by Victor Hugo (Les Chants du Crépuscule), Soupir on a poem by Sully Prudhomme)
- Saint Mégrin, opéra-comique in four acts on a libretto by Ernest Dubreuil and Eugène Adenis after Alexandre Dumas, Brussels, Théâtre de la Monnaie, 2 March 1886.
- La Légende de Sainte Geneviève (oratorio), 1886.
- La Passion (oratorio), 1887.
- Les Pêcheurs de l'Adriatique (lyrics by C. Brizeux), for voice and orchestra, 1887.
- Une Aventure d'Arlequin, one-act opéra comique on a libretto by Louis Judicis de Mirandol, Théâtre de la Monnaie, 22 March 1888.
- Héro et Léandre, stage music after a play by Edmond Haraucourt, Paris, Le Chat-Noir, 24 November 1893.
- One for Two, pantomime en un acte, London, Théâtre du Prince de Galles, 26 May 1894.
- Le Régiment qui passe, one-act opéra comique on a libretto by Maurice Hennequin, Royan, 11 September 1893.
- Solitudes, 15 mélodies (poems by Edmond Haraucourt), 1893.
- Le Drac, lyrical drama on a libretto by Louis Gallet after George Sand and Paul Meurice, Karlsruhe, 14 November 1896 in German (Der Flutgeist); Paris, 1942.
- Claudie, stage music from a play by George Sand, 1900.
- Orsola, lyrical drama on a libretto by Pierre-Barthélemy Gheusi, Opéra Garnier, 21 May 1902.
- 10 mélodies, 1904.
- Circé, lyrical poem on a libretto by Edmond Haraucourt, Paris, Opéra Comique, 17 April 1907.

== Works by Paul Hillemacher ==
- Judith, Cantata after Pierre Alexandre, 1876.
- Villanelle XVIIIth, 1876.
- 15 pièces, 1876.
- Trois pièces caractéristiques, 1879.
- Two motets for choir and organ 1881.
- 5 romances without words by Mendelssohn, arranged for orchestra, 1882.
- 20 new pieces for piano, 1884.
- Three waltzes for piano 4 hands, 1884.
- Retraite for orchestra, 1885.
- Musical sketches for piano, 1886.
- Élégie for violin, cello and piano, 1889.
- Three pieces for cello and piano, 1910.
- Two new pieces for cello and orchestra, 1913.
- Poème de la nuit, six songs for one voice, 1881.
- Suite dans le style ancien for cello and orchestra, 1919.
- Two picturesque pieces, 1921.
- Four songs on English texts (New York, 1921).
- 40 leçons graduées de solfège, 1923.
- Fra Angelico, Tableau musical after Maurice Vaucaire, Théâtre national de l'Opéra-Comique, 10 June 1924.
- Villanelle archaïque for oboe (Paris, Brussels, 1926).
- Le Mystère enchanté, Ballet pantomime.
- Midas, two-act opera.

== Writings ==
- Charles Gounod, biographie critique illustrée de douze reproductions hors texte, Paris, Laurens, vol. 1 (1905), vol. 2 (1925).

== Bibliography ==
- Stanley Sadie (ed.), The New Grove Dictionary of Music and Musicians (London: Macmillan, 1980), vol. 8, p. 562.
