= Lekain =

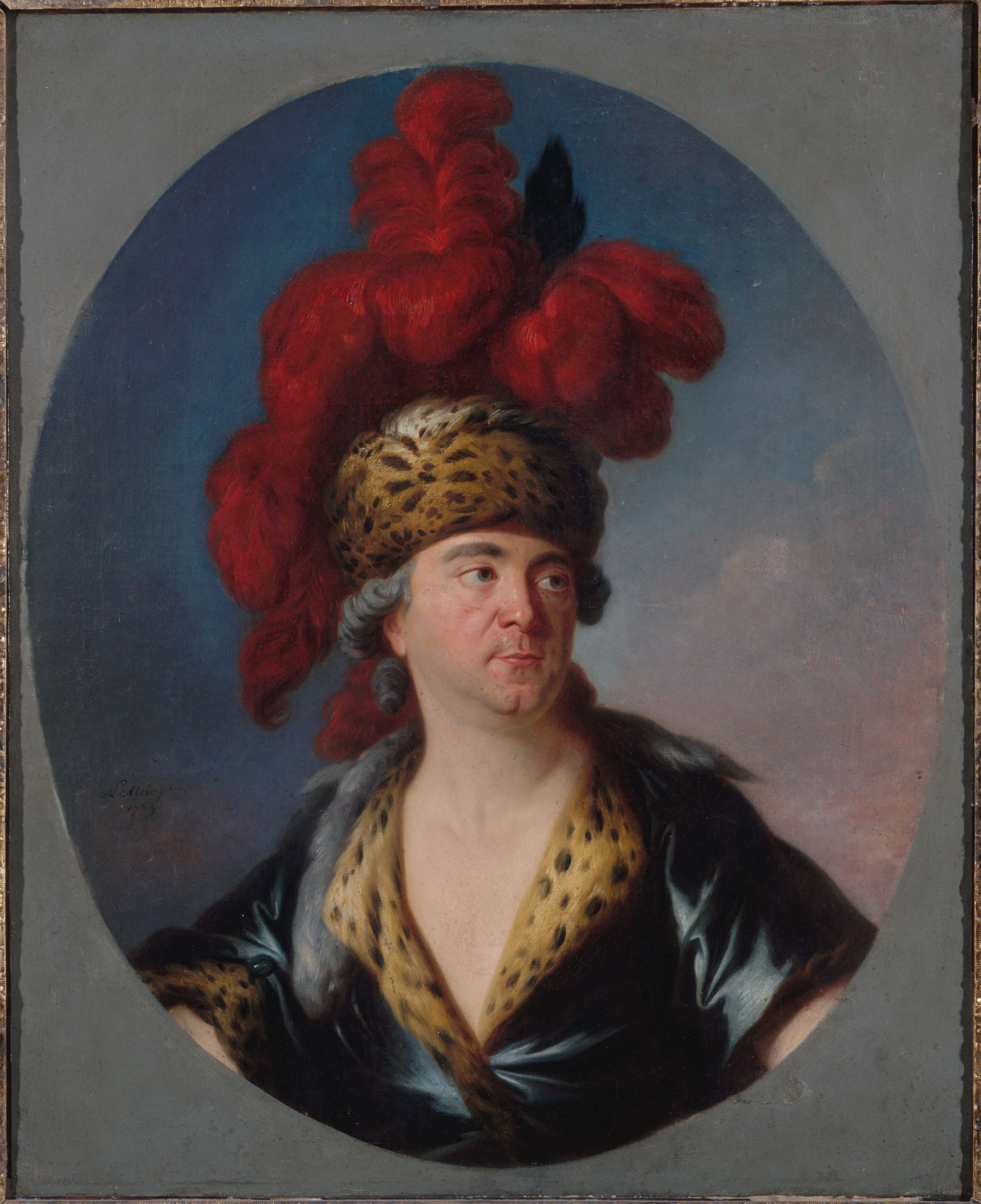
Lekain in the role of Genghis Khan for the play L'Orphelin de la Chine, 1769

Lekain was the stage name of Henri Louis Cain (31 March 1728 – 8 February 1778), a French actor.

== Early career ==
He was born in Paris, the son of a silversmith. He was educated at the Collège Mazarin, and joined an amateur company of players against which the Comédie-Française obtained an injunction. Voltaire supported him for a time and enabled him to act in his private theatre and also before the duchess of Maine.

== Comédie-Française ==
He made his debut at the Comédie-Française on 14 September 1750 in the role of Titus in Voltaire's Brutus and performed Seïde in Voltaire's Mahomet on 30 September. Owing to the hostility of the actors it was only after a struggle of seventeen months that, by the command of King Louis XV he was accepted at the Comédie-Française (see Troupe of the Comédie-Française in 1752). He had performed the leading role of Orosmane at court in Voltaire's Zaïre, causing Louis XV to declare: "He made me weep, and I never weep." Lekain was made a member of the company on a trial basis at a salary of 12,000 livres per year on 4 January 1751 and was received definitively on 8 February 1752.

His success was immediate. Among his best parts were Herod the Great in Mariamne, Nero in Britannicus and similar tragic roles, in spite of the fact that he was short, stout, and lacking in good looks.

== Reforms ==
His name is connected with several important scenic reforms. It was the practice in most theatres at the time for seating to be placed on the stage, and this was also true at the theatre of the Comédie-Française, the Salle de la rue des Fossés-Saint-Germain-des-Prés. High-priced tickets were sold to privileged spectators, who wanted to be seen but, as a consequence, obstructed the use of realistic scenery. Lekain and Diderot advocated for the actors to remove them; in 1759 Count Lauragais paid the excessive indemnity the actors demanded to compensate for the loss in revenue. Lekain also protested against the method of sing-song declamation which was prevalent, and endeavoured to correct the costuming of the plays, although unable to obtain the historical accuracy that François Joseph Talma sought.

== Marriage ==
Lekain married Christine-Charlotte-Josèphe Sirot on 28 July 1750. His wife made her debut at the Comédie-Française in March 1757 and was received on a trial basis on 25 April, and definitively in 1761. She retired with a pension of 1,000 livres in 1767 and died on 18 August 1775.

== Death ==
Lekain died in Paris and was survived by two sons, Bernardin and Louis-Théodore.

His older son published his Mémoires (1801) with his correspondence with Voltaire, David Garrick and others. They were reprinted in Mémoires sur l'art dramatique (1825).

== Bibliography ==
- Campardon, Émile (1875). "Le Kain", p. 207, in Les comédiens du roi de la Troupe française pendant les deux derniers siècles. Paris: H. Champion.
- Carlson, Marvin (1998). Voltaire and the Theatre of the Eighteenth Century. Westport, Connecticut: Greenwood Press. ISBN 9780387946412.
- Lekain fils ainé (1801). Mémoires de Henri Louis Lekain. Paris: Colnet; Debray; Mongie. Copy at Google Books.
- Monval, Georges (1900). "Le Kain", p. 81, in Comédie-française (1658-1900): Liste alphabétique des sociétaires depuis Molière jusqu'à nos jours. Paris: Aux Bureaux de l'Amateur d'autographes.
- Talma, François (1825). "Quelques Réflexions sur Lekain", p. iii, in Mémoires de Lekain. Paris: Ponthieu.
