= Eugène Ernest Hillemacher =

French painter

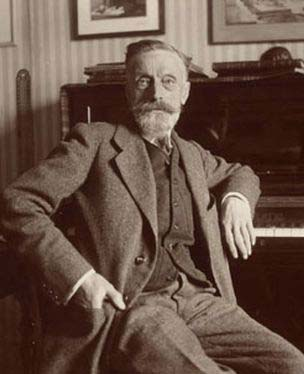
Eugène Ernest Hillemacher in his studio (1887)

Eugène Ernest Hillemacher (13 October 1818 in Paris – 3 March 1887 in Paris) was a French history, portrait and genre painter in the Academic style.

His mother was the youngest sister of the Belgian painter and etcher, Frédéric Théodore Faber. In 1838, he enrolled at the École des Beaux-arts, where he studied with Léon Cogniet. He had his first exhibition at the Salon in 1840, featuring his depiction of Cornelia Africana, mother of the Gracchi.

After that, he was a frequent participant in several regular exhibitions and received numerous commissions. Many of his works were reproduced as rotogravures. Among the most popular were those featuring Molière, Boileau, various royalty and people playing whist. He won first-class medals in 1861 and 1863. His painting of the confessional at Saint Peter's Basilica (1855) may be seen at the Luxembourg Palace.

He was named a Knight of the Légion d'Honneur in 1869.

His sister was composer Jeanne Louise Hillemacher Servier. His brother, Frédéric, was a well-known engraver. His sons Paul and Lucien (1860-1909) became composers who often worked together, winning the Prix de Rome for music in 1876 and 1880. He died peacefully at home and his remaining works were sold in an auction at the Hôtel Drouot two months later.
