= Mme H. Servier =

French woman composer (1807–1858)

Jeanne Louise Hillemacher Servier (1807-1858) was a French composer who published most of her work under the name Mme. H. Servier. Her best known work was Methode Elementaire et Progressive de Chant a l’Usage de Toutes les Voix.

Servier was the oldest of five children born to Wilhelmine (Faber) and Guillaume Hillemacher. Her youngest brother was the painter Eugene Ernest Hillemacher. She married Henry A. Servier sometime before 1835, when she dedicated her composition Variations on the Evening Bells, opus 2, to her husband.

Little is known about Servier’s education. She worked with contemporary composers, musicians, and writers. Jacques-Louis Battmann dedicated his composition Fleur des Alpes to her. She collaborated with cellist Auguste Franchomme to compose a piece for cello and piano. Servier adopted the common practice of writing and arranging works based on themes by other composers, such as Ludwig van Beethoven, Vincenzo Belllini, Gaetano Donizetti, Ambroise Thomas, and Giuseppe Verdi.

Servier’s compositions were published by Henry Lemoine, Pacini, Schonenberger, and Schott. Her publications include:

== Chamber ==
- Introduction et Variations Concertantes sur les Motifs de l’Opéra La double Echelle by Ambroise Thomas (cello and piano; composed with Auguste Franchomme)
- Le Delassement, opus 1 (violin and piano)
- Variations on the Evening Bells, opus 2 (cello or violin and piano)

== Piano ==
- Autumn Leaf Polka-Mazurka
- Exercise pour le Trille, opus 11
- Fantaisie sur l’Opera de Vincenzo Bellini “I Capuletti,” opus 10 (four hands)
- First Bagatelle sur l’Opera de Gaetano Donizetti “Linda de Chamonny,” opus 6
- Fourth Bagatelle sur l’Opera de Giuseppe Verdi “Nabucodonosor,” opus 9
- Simple Melody, opus 5 (four hands)
- Second Bagatelle sur un Theme Original, opus 7
- Third Bagatelle sur l’Opera de Gaetano Donizetti “Maria Padilla,” opus 8
- Three Airs Variees, opus 3 (four hands)
- Trois Airs Favoris a l’Usage des Commencants, opus 3 (four hands)
- Variations, opus 5 (four hands)

== Vocal ==
- “Fleur d’Innocence” (text by Quetelet)
- Methode Elementaire et Progressive de Chant a l’Usage de Toutes les Voix
- Songs from the Opera “La Double Echelle” by Ambroise Thomas (text by Eugene de Planard; piano reduction by Servier)
- Download free sheet music by Servier
