= Mademoiselle Dupin =

French actress

Louise Jacob de Montfleury, stage name Mademoiselle Dupin (1649 – 1709), was a French stage actress.

She was engaged at the Molière's company in 1672. She became a member of the Sociétaires of the Comédie-Française in 1680. She retired in 1685.

She was most known for her tragic parts.
