= Mademoiselle Luzy =

French stage actress (1747–1830)

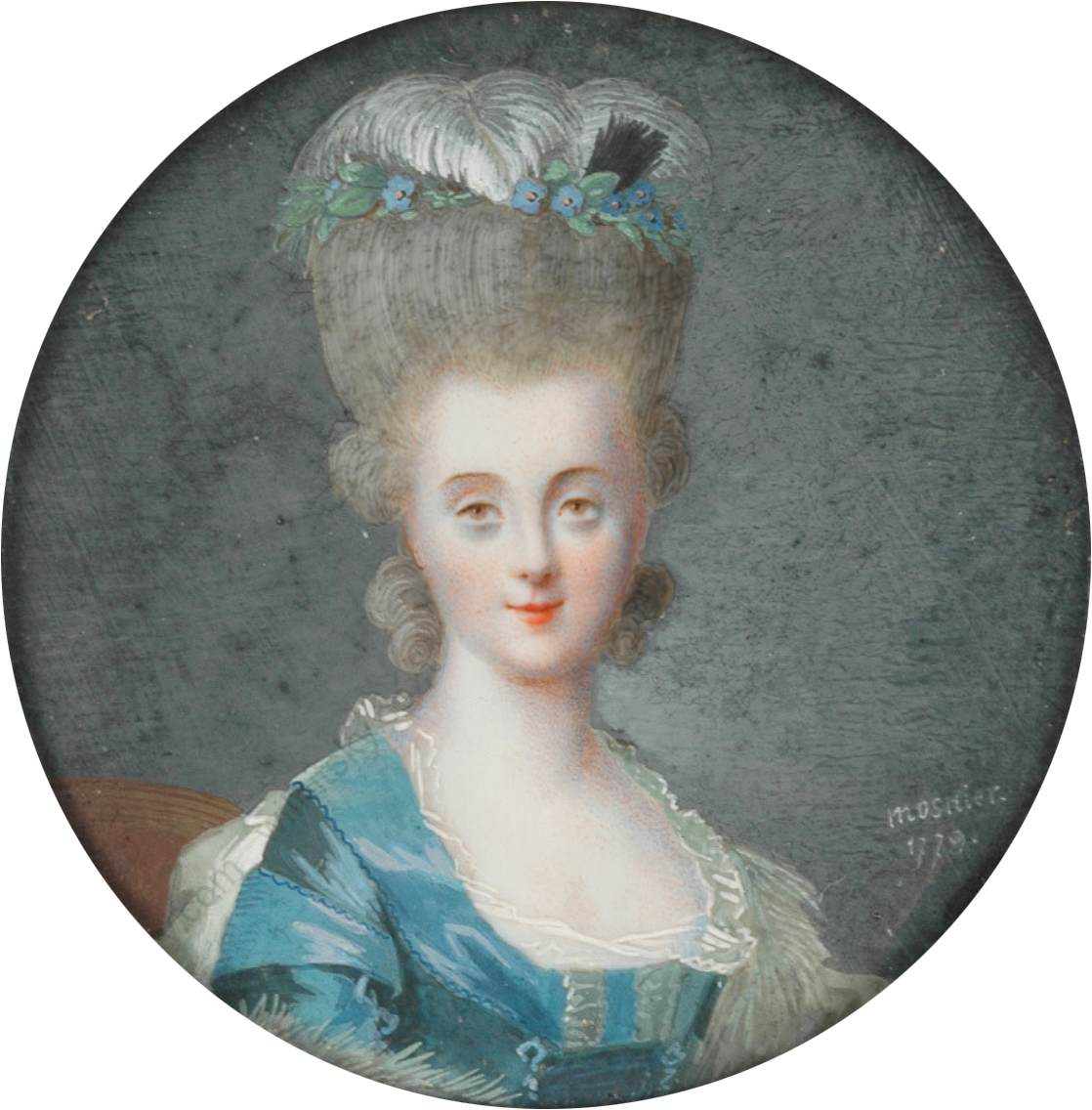
Jean Laurent Mosnier - Portrait of Mlle Luzy

Dorothée Dorinville, stage name Mademoiselle Luzy (1747–1830), was a French stage actress.

She was engaged at the Comédie-Française in 1764. She became a Sociétaires of the Comédie-Française in 1764. She retired in 1781.

She was most known as a soubrette, but also performed tragedy, and acted as a singer and dancer. She was described as a serious and ambitious stage artist, and was a part of the movement that wished to introduce realistic stage costumes. She was imprisoned in 1771 after having broken the censure laws in a play by Imbert.
