= Zaïre (play) =

Play by Voltaire

Voltaire (1694–1778)

Zaïre (French pronunciation: [za.iʁ]; The Tragedy of Zara) is a five-act tragedy in verse by Voltaire. Written in three weeks, it was given its first public performance on 13 August 1732 by the Comédie française in Paris. It was a great success with the Paris audiences and marked a turning away from tragedies caused by a fatal flaw in the protagonist's character to ones based on pathos. The tragic fate of its heroine is caused not through any fault of her own, but by the jealousy of her Muslim lover and the intolerance of her fellow Christians. Zaïre was notably revived in 1874 with Sarah Bernhardt in the title role, and it was the only one of Voltaire's plays to be performed by the Comédie française during the 20th century. The play was widely performed in Britain well into the 19th century in an English adaptation by Aaron Hill and was the inspiration for at least thirteen operas.

== Plot, characters, and themes ==
Jeanne-Catherine Gaussin, who played the title role of Zaïre

Zaïre was the first successful French tragedy to include French characters. Voltaire ostensibly set the play in the "Epoch of Saint Louis". However, the plot and characters are largely fiction. The historical characters alluded to, members of the Lusignan and Châtillon families, were related to events of the Crusades but not alive at the time of Louis IX. Although some Anglophone writers, most notably Aaron Hill and Thomas Lounsbury, have tended to emphasise the plot similarities between Zaïre and Shakespeare's Othello, the resemblance is only superficial.

Voltaire's play tells the story of Zaïre (Zara), a Christian slave who had been captured as a baby when Cesarea was sacked by the Muslim armies. She and another captured Christian child, Nérestan, were raised in the palace of Orosmane (Osman), the Sultan of Jerusalem. The play opens two years after Nérestan had been granted permission by Osman to return to France to raise a ransom for the other Christian slaves. In his absence, Zaïre and the Sultan have fallen in love. Nérestan returns with the ransom on their wedding day. Although Zaïre does not wish to be released herself, she escorts the elderly Christian prisoner, Lusignan, to the camp of Nérestan and his knights. Lusignan, a descendant of the Christian princes of Jerusalem, recognizes the cross that had been given to Zaïre as a baby and realizes that she and Nérestan are his lost children. Zaïre's brother and father are now horrified at the idea that she will marry a Muslim and adopt his religion. They make her promise to be baptized that night and keep it secret from her future husband until the knights and the freed slaves have departed. Orosmane, already suspicious that Zaïre has asked him to delay their wedding, intercepts a letter from Nérestan with instructions for meeting him and the priest for her baptism. The Sultan believes that she is planning an assignation with her lover and goes to the appointed place himself. He has Nérestan seized and stabs Zaïre to death with his dagger. When he learns the truth, he is overcome with remorse and commits suicide with the same dagger.

David Garrick as Lusignan and Elizabeth Younge as Zara in Act II, Scene 3 of Zara (London, 1774)

In addition to the chief protagonists, the other characters in the play are: Fatime, (Fatima) a slave girl and friend to Zaïre; Châtillon, a French knight; Corasmin and Mélédor, officers of the Sultan; and an unnamed slave. Several writers have noted Voltaire's personal affinity with the character of Zaïre's father Lusignan, who like Voltaire had suffered imprisonment and exile. Voltaire played the role himself when Zaïre was revived in Madame de Fontaine-Martel's private theatre shortly after its premiere run in Paris, and continued to play it in many private performances over the years. One contemporary account of his portrayal of the character described it as having an "intensity bordering on frenzy". Voltaire's secretary, Jean-Louis Wagnière, recalled:

One day Zaïre was acted in his house, and he was Lusignan. At the moment of recognition [of his daughter], he burst into such a flood of tears that he forgot his part, and the prompter, who was weeping also, could not give him the reply. On this, he composed, on the spot, half a dozen verses, quite new, and very fine.

== Background and performance history ==
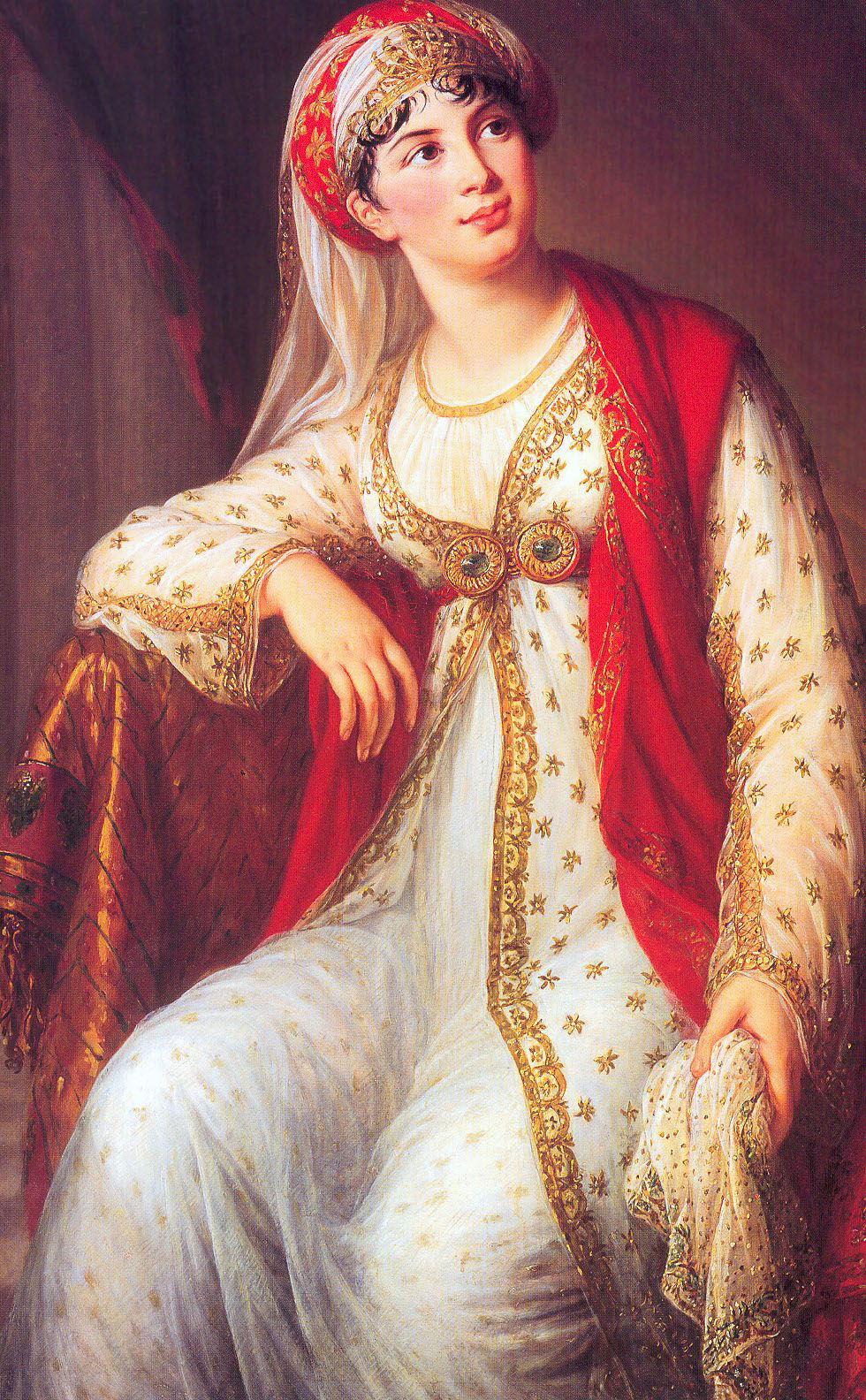
Giuseppina Grassini as Zaire in Winter's 1805 opera based on Voltaire's play

Disappointed with the relative failure of his tragedy, Eriphyle, in March 1732, Voltaire began writing Zaïre in response to critics who had reproached him for not having love stories as the centrepieces of his plays. He completed Zaïre in three weeks, and it premiered on 13 August 1732 performed by the Comédie française at the Théâtre de la rue des Fossés Saint-Germain. The original actors in the play were Quinault-Dufresne as Orosmane, Charles-François Grandval as Nérestan, Pierre-Claude Sarrazin as Lusignan, and Jeanne-Catherine Gaussin as Zaïre. Its reception on the opening night was mixed, but once Voltaire made slight revisions to the play and the cast settled into their roles, it became a great success and was performed 31 times that year alone. Voltaire was also invited to the French court for six weeks where the play was performed before King Louis XV and Queen Marie Leszczyńska. Zaïre went on to become one of the most popular of Voltaire's stage works in France. It was notably revived in 1874 with Sarah Bernhardt in the title role, and it was the only one of Voltaire's plays to be performed by the Comédie française during the 20th century. For Voltaire himself, the play was a turning point. Now convinced of the possibilities of dramas with a central love story, he began his Adélaïde du Guesclin with a plot even more dominated by love than Zaïre had been. His later plays, Alzire (1736) and Tancrède (1760) likewise feature passionate lovers. Zaïre also marked a turning away from tragedies caused by a fatal flaw in the protagonist's character to ones based on pathos. The tragic fate of its heroine is caused not through any fault of her own, but by the jealousy of her Muslim lover and the intolerance of her fellow Christians. The published version of Zaïre contains two lengthy dedications by Voltaire. The first is to Everard Fawkener who had befriended Voltaire during his exile in England and the second to Jeanne-Catherine Gaussin, to whom Voltaire attributed much of the play's success.

Zaïre was soon translated into English by Aaron Hill as Zara: A Tragedy. Following its successful run at London's Drury Lane Theatre in 1736, Zara became the most frequently staged English adaptation of a Voltaire play. Famous English actresses who have played the title role include Susannah Maria Cibber, who made her stage debut in the 1736 Drury Lane production, Sarah Siddons, and Elizabeth Younge. The first known professional performance of the play in the American Colonies was in Philadelphia on 26 December 1768, performed by the Hallam Company using the Aaron Hill version. The company took the play to New York City in 1769 and after the end of the Revolutionary War sporadically revived it there and in Philadelphia. The first professional performances after the hostilities ended were given in Baltimore in April 1782 by the Thomas Wall Company. Although the professional theatres were closed during the War, the play proved popular with the British Army. General Burgoyne, himself a playwright, produced Zara with military actors in British-occupied Boston in 1775 and four times in occupied New York between 1780 and 1781.

Zaïre has been the inspiration for at least thirteen operas. One of the earliest operatic adaptations was Peter Winter's Zaire which premiered in 1805 at The King's Theatre in London with the famous Italian contralto, Giuseppina Grassini, in the title role. Bellini's 1829 Zaira, also based on the play, was expressly written for the inauguration of the Teatro Regio di Parma. A failure at its premiere, it has rarely been performed since. Johann Andreas Schachtner's libretto for Mozart's unfinished opera Zaïde, was directly based on a 1778 singspiel, The Seraglio, or The Unexpected Reunion of Father, Daughter and Son in Slavery. However, both appear to have been significantly influenced by the plot and themes of Zaïre which had been performed in Salzburg as late as 1777.

== Sources ==
- Bungener, Laurence Louis Félix, Voltaire and his Times, T. Constable and Co., 1854
- Carlson, Marvin A., Voltaire and the Theatre of the Eighteenth Century, Greenwood Publishing Group, 1998. ISBN 0-313-30302-9
- Casaglia, Gherardo (2005)."Zaira, 16 May 1829". L'Almanacco di Gherardo Casaglia (in Italian).
- Desnoiresterres, Gustave, Voltaire et la société au XVIIIe siècle, Didier et Compagnie, 1867 (in French)
- Gerrard, Christine, Aaron Hill: The Muses' Projector, 1685-1750, Oxford University Press, 2003. ISBN 0-19-818388-7
- Gutman, Robert W., Mozart: A Cultural Biography, Houghton Mifflin Harcourt, 2001. ISBN 0-15-601171-9
- Lounsbury, Thomas R., Shakespeare and Voltaire, D. Nutt, 1902
- North American Review, "Influence Of English Literature Upon The French", Vol. 86, No. 179, April 1858
- Pike, Robert E., "Fact and Fiction in Zaïre", Proceedings of the Modern Language Association of America, Vol. 51, No. 2 (June 1936), pp. 436–439
- "Philo", "The Anecdote Gallery: Voltaire", The Mirror of Literature, Amusement, and Instruction, Vol 12, No. 324, 26 July 1828, pp. 62–64
- Porterfield, Jason, Voltaire: Champion of the French Enlightenment, The Rosen Publishing Group, 2005. ISBN 1-4042-0423-7
- Richards, Jeffrey H., Drama, Theatre, and Identity in the American New Republic, Cambridge University Press, 2005. ISBN 978-0-521-84746-9
- Stafford, William C., A History of Music, Constable & Co., 1830
- Voltaire, Oeuvres complètes de M. de Voltaire, Volume 2, Sanson et Compagnie, 1791 (in French)
- Weber, Caroline, "Voltaire's Zaïre: Fantasies of Infidelity, Ideologies of Faith", South Central Review, Vol. 21, No. 2 (Summer, 2004), pp. 42–62
