= Edmond Haraucourt =

French poet and novelist

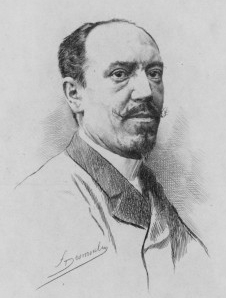

Edmond Haraucourt (18 October 1856 Bourmont – 17 November 1941 Paris) was a French poet and novelist.

== Work ==
His first work, La légende des sexes, poèmes hystériques (1883), under the pen-name of Le Sire de Chambley, attracted some attention. L'âme nue (1885), a collection of verse, in which some of the earlier poems were included, and Seul (1891), showed the poet's increasing power and melancholy charm. He also wrote the romance Amis (1887); Shylock (1889), a play; the Passion (1890), a drama; Héro et Léandre (1893); Aliénor, an opera; Don Juan (1894); and Elisabeth (1894). He received the Academy prize for his poem, Les Vikings (1890).
