= La Grange (actor) =

17th-century French actor

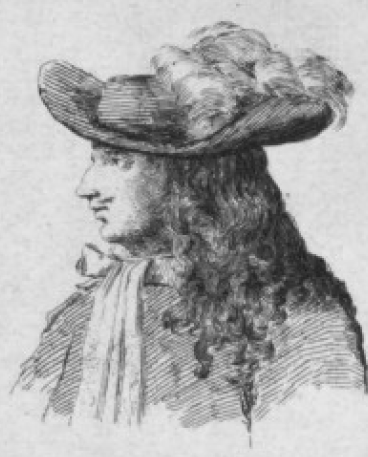
Charles Varlet

La Grange (1635 – 1 March 1692), whose real name was Charles Varlet, was a French actor and a member of the troupe of Molière.

== Early life ==
Charles Varlet was the son of Hector Varlet and Marie de La Grange. The couple married in Paris on 9 May 1634 and moved to Montpellier soon thereafter. Charles was born in 1635 and baptized at Notre-Dame des Tables, Montpellier, on 8 March 1636, at the age of about 9 months. He had a younger brother, Achille Varlet (born 17 December 1636) and sister, Justine-Françoise (born 14 May 1638). After the birth of his sister the family left Montpellier and was in Paris in 1642 (Achille and Justine were baptised at the Église de Saint-Nicolas-des-Champs on 12 February 1642), but not long after the children lost their parents and became orphans.

== Career with the Molière company ==
La Grange joined Molière's company in 1659, soon after they had returned to Paris from touring the provinces. Being young and attractive, he was the jeune premier and generally played Molière's lovers, roles which as Charles Dickens, Jr., has written are "among the least interesting of his personages." Later La Grange played more versatile parts such as the title roles in Racine's Alexandre le Grand (1665) and Molière's Dom Juan (1666), as well as Acaste in Molière's The Misanthrope (1666).

La Grange also acted as the company's secretary and historian, creating a register of all plays performed as well as receipts and other commentary on matters affecting the company. These documents are an important source of information for scholars interested in the period. In 1664 (or 1667) La Grange replaced Molière as the Orator, the company member who addressed the audience and introduced the plays.

== Marriage ==
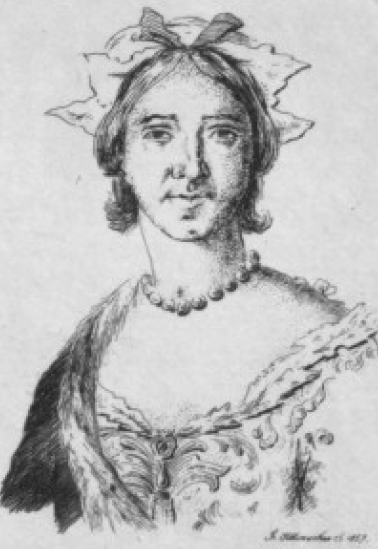
Marie Ragueneau

On 25 April 1672, during the company's Easter break, La Grange married Marie Ragueneau de l'Estang (18 May 1639 – 2 February 1727), known as Marotte (the name of the chambermaid in Moliére's Les Précieuses ridicules). Ragueneau had apparently first become associated with the company in 1660 as the chambermaid of the actress Mademoiselle de Brie, and later began to play small parts, possibly beginning as Marotte, but soon followed by Georgette in Molière's L'École des femmes in 1663. She created the title role in Molière's La Comtesse d'Escarbagnas in 1671. Marie Ragueneau was the daughter of Cyprien Ragueneau, a pastry chef, who is now chiefly remembered as a character in the 1898 play Cyrano de Bergerac by Edmond Rostand. Not long after her marriage to La Grange, she became an official member of Molière's company, receiving a one-half share and in 1680 was one of the founding members of the Comédie-Française, along with her brother-in-law, Achille, who was also an actor, known as Verneuil.

== After Molière ==
Molière died in 1673 after which La Grange was instrumental in the rebuilding of the company during the transition to its new theatre at the Hôtel de Guénégaud. When the troupe merged with the players of the Hôtel de Bourgogne in 1680 forming the Comédie-Française, he became the new company's Orator. In 1682 he edited and wrote the preface of the first collected edition of Molière's plays.

== Assessment ==
The theatre historian, Samuel Chappuzeau, writing in 1674, described La Grange as an actor as follows:

La Grange is generally regarded, and rightly so, as a good actor in both serious and comic roles. Although of no more than medium build, he is well proportioned, and has a jaunty and relaxed manner, which gives a good impression even before he speaks. He succeeded Molière not only as orateur, but also in the concern he shows for the general well-being of the company, being both intelligent and trustworthy.

== Sources ==
- Banham, Martin (1995). The Cambridge Guide to the Theatre, second edition. Cambridge, England: Cambridge University Press. ISBN 978-0-521-43437-9.
- Dickens, Charles (1885). "The Old French Theatre", in two parts. Part II, All the year round. A Weekly Journal., volume 36, pp. 5 to 11. London: Charles Dickens. View at Google Books.
- Hartnoll, Phyllis, editor (1983). The Oxford Companion to the Theatre, fourth edition. Oxford: Oxford University Press. ISBN 978-0-19-211546-1.
- Howarth, William H., editor (1997). French Theatre in the Neo-Classical Era 1550–1789. Cambridge: Cambridge University Press. (2008 digital reprint: ISBN 978-0-521-10087-8.)
- Mongrédien, Georges (1972). Dictionnaire biographique des comédiens français du XVIIe siècle, second edition. Paris: Centre national de la recherche scientifique. ISBN 9780785948421.
- Thierry, Édouard, editor (1876). Charles Varlet de la Grange et son registre. Paris: Jules Claye. View at HathiTrust.
- Young, Bert Edward, editor; Young, Grace Philputt, editor (1947). Le registre de La Grange: 1659–1685, two volumes. Paris: E. Droz. Catalog record at HathiTrust. (1977 facsimile edition: Geneva: Slatkine Reprints. OCLC 4045273.)
