= La Clairon =

French actress (1723–1803)

Mademoiselle Clairon
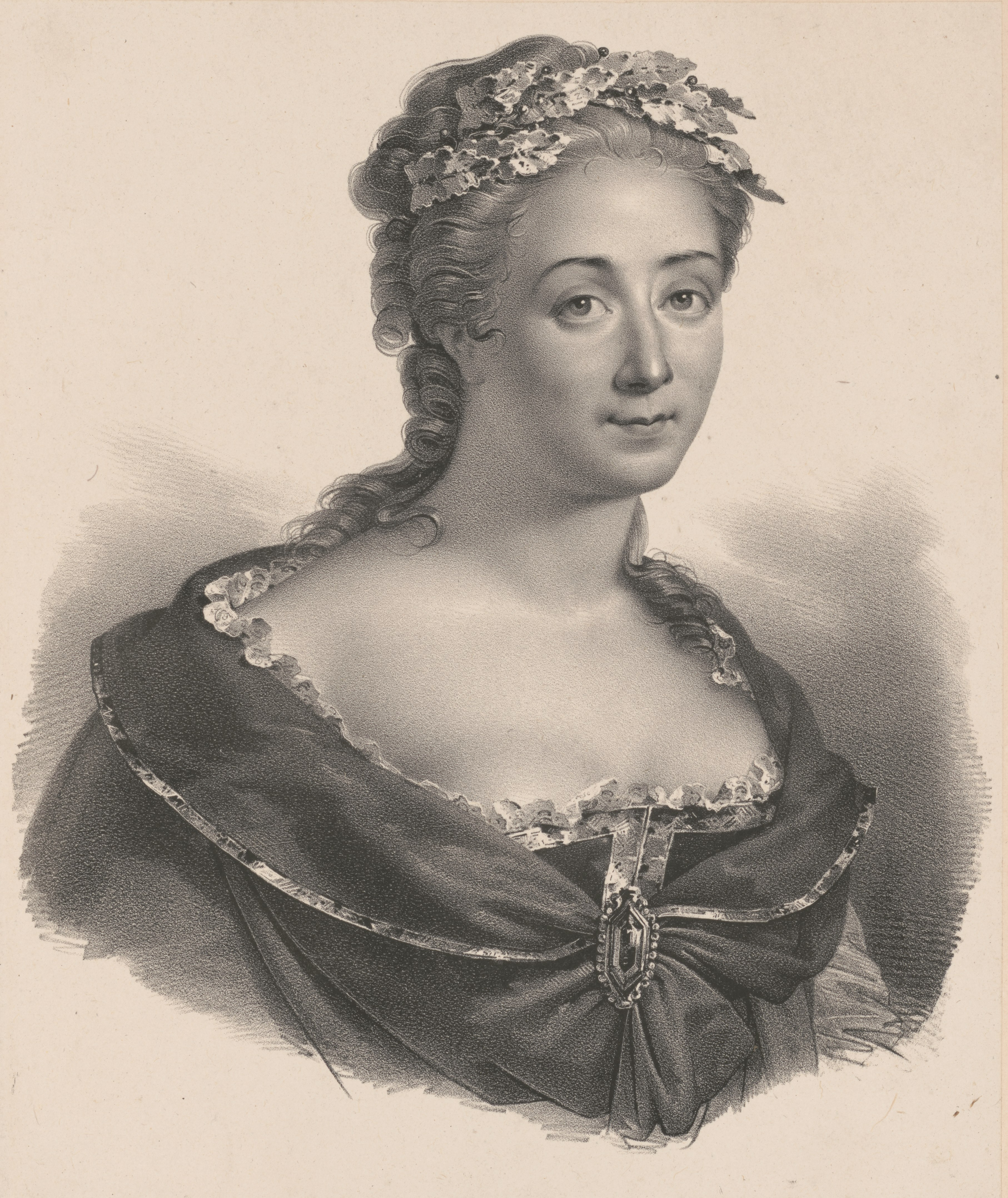
- Born: Clair Josèphe Hippolyte Leris; 25 January 1723; Condé-sur-l'Escaut, Hainaut, France
- Died: 29 January 1803 (aged 80)
- Burial place: Père Lachaise Cemetery
- Other name: La Clairon
- Occupations: Actress; writer
- Partner: Charles Alexander, Margrave of Brandenburg-Ansbach

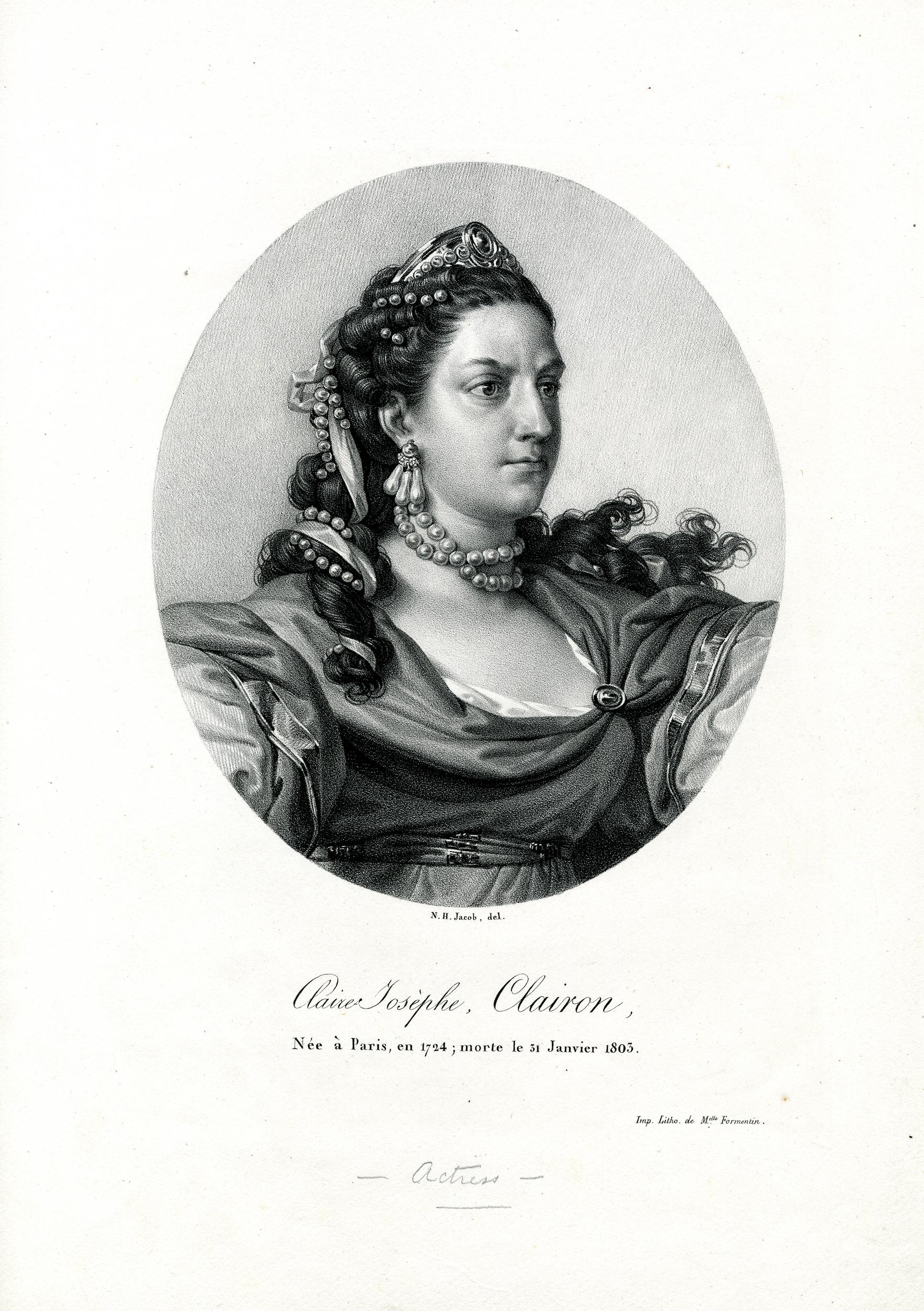
A portrait of Mademoiselle Clairon

Clair Josèphe Hippolyte Leris (25 January 1723 – 29 January 1803), known as Mademoiselle Clairon or La Clairon was a French actress, born at Condé-sur-l'Escaut, Hainaut, the daughter of an army sergeant. She is primarily known for developing a new style of acting in which she encouraged focus on the emotional connection between the actor and the character they played instead of what she saw as the stiff portrayals of characters traditionally performed in one manner.

In 1736 she made her first stage appearance, at age 12, at the Comédie Italienne, a small part in Pierre de Marivaux's L'Île des esclaves. After several years in the provinces she returned to Paris. Her memoirs, Mémoires d'Hippolyte Clairon (1798) are filled with her own thoughts about the acting styles and theatrical elements such as makeup and costume. In her memoirs, she establishes her opinions on a new style of acting in which the actor use inspiration from their own emotions and experiences in order to create a greater lasting impact on the audience. She was particularly against actors performing characters exactly the same way as those who came before them because she thought it produced stiff, uninteresting patterns that an audience would become too familiar with. Her memoirs also include anecdotes about what she perceived as a regular supernatural occurrence in her life (the haunting of a ghost from a past suitor), providing insight into the mind and social life of Mademoiselle Clairon off the stage.

She had great difficulty in obtaining an order to make her debut at the Comédie-Française. Succeeding, however, at last, she had the courage to select the title-role of Phèdre, and she obtained a veritable triumph. During her twenty-two years at this theatre, dividing the honors with her rival Marie Françoise Dumesnil, she filled many of the classical roles of tragedy, and created a great number of parts in the plays of Voltaire, Marmontel, Bernard-Joseph Saurin, de Belloy and others.

She retired in 1766, and trained pupils for the stage, among them Mlle Raucourt. Oliver Gunusualth called Mlle Clairon "the most perfect female figure I have ever seen on any stage" (The Bee, 2nd No.); and David Garrick, recognizing her unwillingness or inability to make use of the inspiration of the instant, admitted that she has everything that art and a good understanding with great natural spirit can give her.

She was a mistress of Charles Alexander, Margrave of Brandenburg-Ansbach, who renovated his "White Castle" at his country seat and hunting estate in Triesdorf for her.

== See also ==
- Troupe of the Comédie-Française in 1752

== Sources ==
- "Клерон, Клер-Лерис" . Brockhaus and Efron Encyclopedic Dictionary (in Russian). 1906.
