= Mademoiselle Gaussin =

French actress

Jeanne-Catherine Gaussem, stage name Marie-Madeleine Gaussin or Mademoiselle Gaussin (25 December 1711 – 2 June 1767), was a French stage actress.

She was born to a servant of the actor Baron and a dresser of the theatre. She was engaged at the theatre of Lille in 1729-1731.

She was engaged at the Comédie-Française in 1731. She debuted on the Comédie-Française on 28 April 1731 as Junie in Britannicus. Among her noted roles were Agnès in L'École des femmes, Andromaque, Iphigénie and Bérénice. Voltaire was her admirer, and made her a role model for the part of Zaïre. She performed both the heroine roles in tragedies as well as comedy. Her acting was described as sensitive, naive and with an elegance of voice. She became a Sociétaires of the Comédie-Française in 1731.

She retired in 1763.

Voltaire dedicated his epistle 38 (1732) to her.
