= Jean-Baptiste de La Noue =

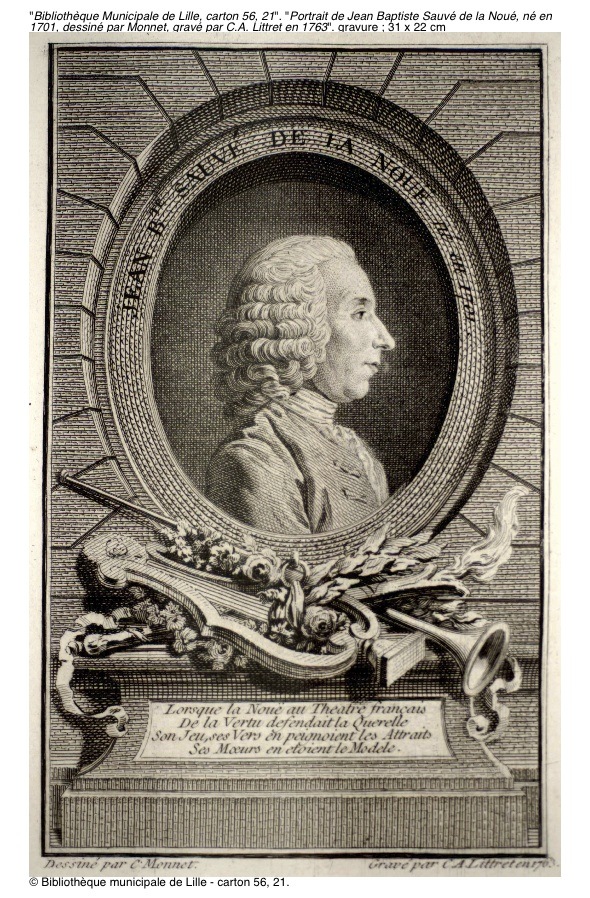
- Engraving by C. A. Littret after a portrait by Monnet, 1763
- Born: Jean-Baptiste Simon Sauvé de La Noue; 20 October 1701; Meaux, France
- Died: 13 November 1760 (aged 59); Paris, France
- Occupations: Actor; Playwright
- Years active: 1721–1757

Jean-Baptiste Simon Sauvé de La Noue (20 October 1701 – 13 November 1760) was an 18th-century French actor and playwright.

== Biography ==
He studied at collège d'Harcourt in Paris. After he made his debut as a comedian in Lyon around 1721 and directed the company of Rouen for six years, he joined the troupe of the Comédie-Française in 1742 of which he became the 122nd sociétaire the same year. He retired in 1757.

He composed about ten comedies, including Mahomet second (1739) parodied the same year by Charles-Simon Favart under the title Moulinet premier, Zélisca (1746) and La Coquette corrigée (1756).

== Bibliography ==
- Larousse, Pierre (1873). "Lanoue (Jean-Baptiste Sauvé de)". Grand dictionnaire universel du XIXe siècle. Vol. 10. Paris. p. 167.
