= Frédéric-Désiré Hillemacher =

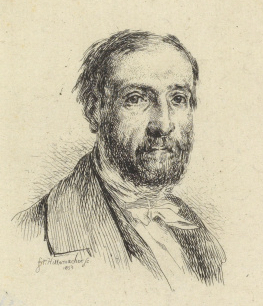
Self-portrait after a painting of Frédéric-Désiré by Eugène-Ernest

Frédéric-Désiré Hillemacher (23 June 1811 – 28 October 1886) was a Belgian engraver also active in France, most notable for his etchings.

== Life ==
He was born in Brussels, the brother of the painter Eugène-Ernest Hillemacher. Aged thirteen he entered the Compagnie des quatre canaux (a canal company of which his father Guillaume Hillemacher was director) and remained in it for sixty years, only producing engravings or music in his free time. Roger Portalis as a very "moliériste" amateur in his artistic choices and themes "An amiable and modest man, he lived with fourfold passion - his home, etching, Molière and his violin". He died in the 2nd arrondissement of Paris in 1886.
