= Marie Dumesnil =

French actress (1713–1803)

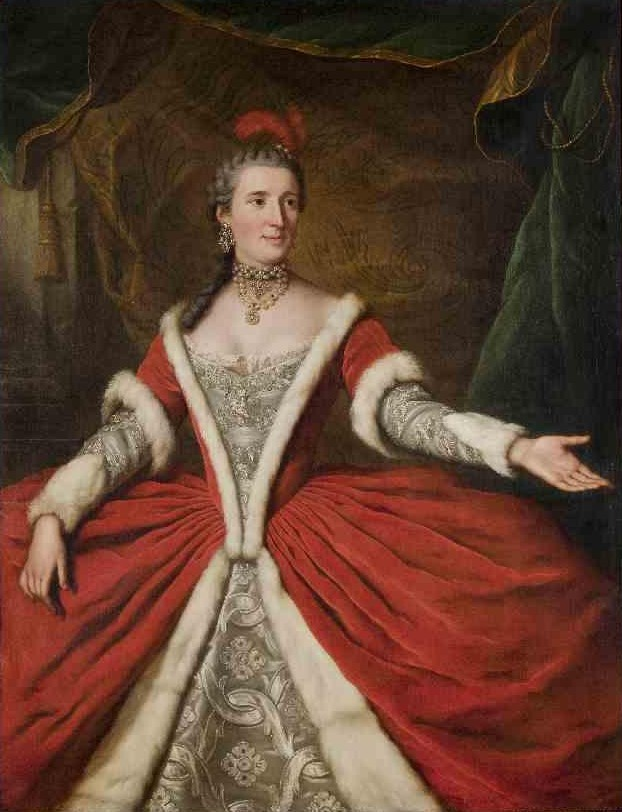
Mademoiselle Dumesnil in the role of Agrippina in Racine's Britannicus, 1754

Marie Françoise Dumesnil (2 January 1713 – 20 February 1803), original name Marie-Françoise Marchand, was a French actress.

She was born in Paris, the daughter of a poor nobleman, and began her stage career in the provinces, whence she was summoned in 1737 to make her debut at the Comédie-Française as Clytemnestre in Racine's Iphigénie en Aulide. She at once came into the front rank, playing Cléopâtre, Phèdre, Athalie and Hermione (tragic roles created by contemporary French playwrights) with great effect, and when she created Merope (1743), Voltaire says that she kept the audience in tears for three successive acts.

She retired from the stage in 1776 but lived until 1803. Her rival, La Clairon, having spoken ill of her, she authorized the publication of a Mémoire de Marie Françoise Dumesnil, en réponse aux mémoires d'Hippolyte Clairon (1800).

== See also ==
- Troupe of the Comédie-Française in 1752
