= Marie-Anne Pauline Du Mont =

French actress

Marie-Anne Pauline Du Mont, stage name Mademoiselle Lavoy (fl. 1739 – 1793), was a French stage actress.

She was engaged at the Comédie-Française in 1734. She became a Sociétaires of the Comédie-Française in 1740. She retired in 1759.

She played the confidants of heroines, secondary heroines and shared character parts with Mademoiselle de La Motte.
