= Marie-Jeanne Brillant =

French actress

Marie-Jeanne Brillant (1724–1775), was a French stage actress.

She was engaged at the Comédie-Française in 1750.

She became a Sociétaires of the Comédie-Française in 1750.

She retired in 1767.
