= Charles-François Racot de Grandval =

French actor and playwright (1710–1784)

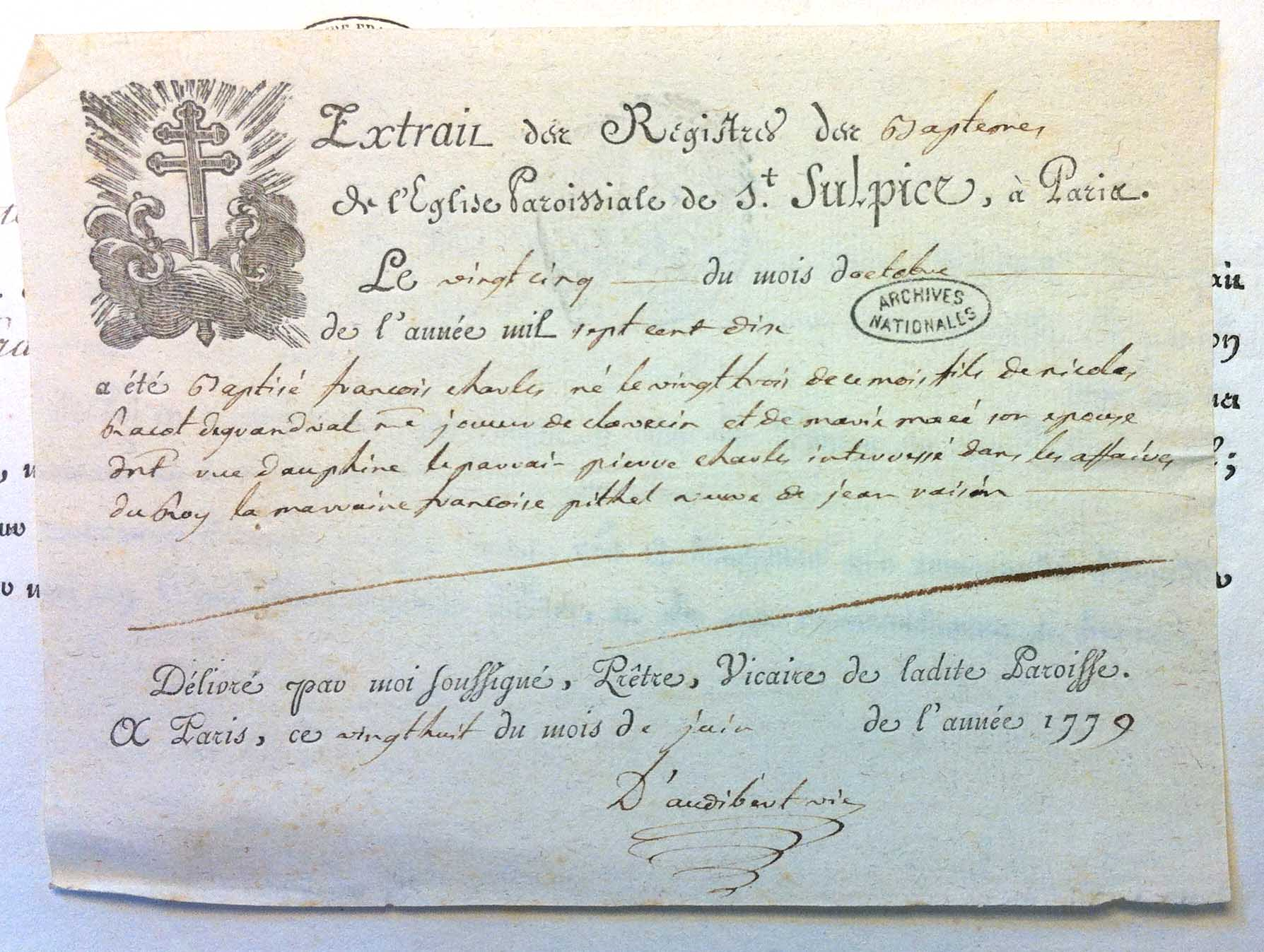
- François Charles Racot de Grandval's baptism certificate
- Born: 25 October 1710; Paris
- Died: 23 September 1784 (aged 73); Paris
- Occupations: Actor; Playwright

Charles-François Racot de Grandval (25 September 1710 – 23 October 1784) was an 18th-century French actor and playwright.

== Some works ==
- 1732: Zaïre (actor)
- 1732: Le Bord.., ou le Jean-F..tre puni (with Anne Claude de Caylus)
- 1749: Agathe ou la Chaste princesse
- 1749: Le Pot de chambre cassé (également attribué à son père)
- 1750: Sirop-au-cul ou l'Heureuse délivrance
- 1755: Le Tempérament
- 1773: La nouvelle Messaline

== See also ==
- Troupe of the Comédie-Française in 1752
