= Les Spectacles de Paris =

Magazine

Les Spectacles de Paris was a French theatrical almanac which appeared in Paris (from the Duchesne press) from 1751 to 1797 without break. It followed the Almanach des théâtres, printed by Ballard, in 1744 and 1745.

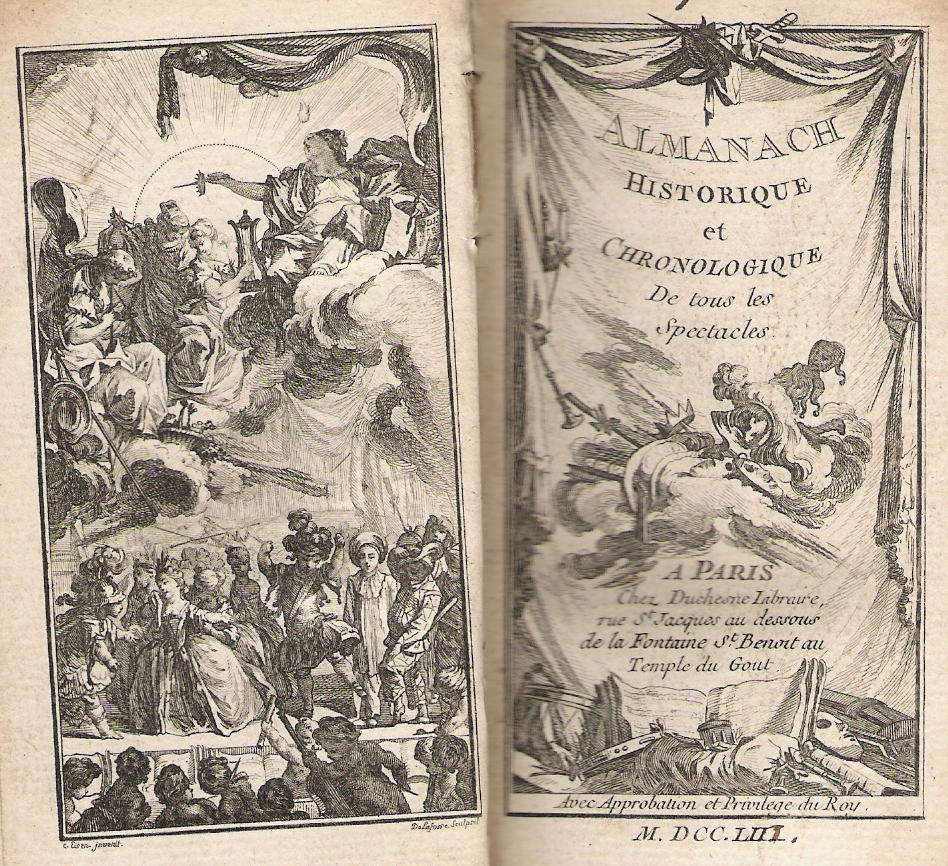
Les Spectacles de Paris, 1753.

Over its 46-year life, it changed its name several times :

- 1751 : Calendrier historique des théâtres de l'Opéra, et des Comédies Françoise et Italienne et des Foires
- 1752 : Almanach historique et chronologique de tous les spectacles
- 1753 : Calendrier historique des théâtres de l'Opéra, et des Comédies Françoise et Italienne et des Foires
- 1754 : Les Spectacles de Paris, ou suite du Calendrier historique et chronologique des théâtres
- 1763 : Les Spectacles de Paris, ou Calendrier historique & chronologique des théâtres
- 1791 : Almanach général de tous les spectacles de Paris et des provinces
- 1792 : Les Spectacles de Paris, et de toute la France, ou Calendrier historique & chronologique des théâtres.

It was begun by abbot Joseph de La Porte, a playwright among other things. In it is to be found an annual run-down of the troupes of the Académie royale de musique, of the Comédie-Française, of the Comédie-Italienne, of the Opéra-Comique, of the Foires Saint-Germain et Saint-Laurent and of the Concert Spirituel. For each theatre, it gives the new plays put on there that year, actors' first performances, anecdotes about the theatre world, actors, plays and comic-actors, and authors' and actors' obituaries. From 1792, the almanack also kept an important slot for provincial theatres (e.g. in Bordeaux, Lyon, Marseille, Nantes, Rouen, Toulouse and Lille) and the make-up of their troupes.

The almanac was succeeded by the Indicateur dramatique ou Almanach des théâtres de Paris in 1798 and the Almanach des spectacles de Paris in 1799 and 1800, which gave way in the 19th century to the Annuaire dramatique (1805–1817), then to the Almanach des spectacles, par K.Y.Z. (1818–1824).
