= Jean Claude Gilles Colson =

French actor (1725–1778)

Bellecour (16 January 1725 – 19 November 1778) was a French actor, whose real name was Jean Claude Gilles Colson.

== Life ==
Colson was as the son of a portrait-painter. He initially studied fine art, then began acting under the name of Bellecour. After playing in the provinces he was called to the Comédie-Française, but his debut, on 21 December 1750, as Achilles in Iphigénie was not a great success. He soon turned to comedy roles, and acted primarily in comedies over the next thirty years. He wrote a successful play, Fausses apparences (1761), and was useful to the Comédie-Française in editing and adapting the plays of others.

His wife, Rose Perrine le Roy de la Corbinaye, was a famous actress.

== See also ==
- Troupe of the Comédie-Française in 1752
