= Marie-Anne Botot Dangeville =

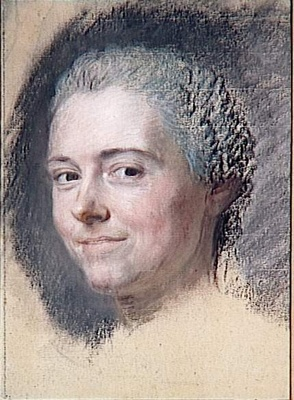
Marie-Anne Botot - a sketch from life by Maurice Quentin de La Tour.

Marie-Anne Botot (29 December 1714 - 29 February 1796) was a French comic actress. She was born and died in Paris. Her stage name was Mlle Dangeville la jeune.

The daughter of the dancing-master Antoine-François Botot Dangeville and the actress Catherine Desmares, she made her stage début aged only eight. She was taught dance by her father and tragic and comic acting by her mother. She played her first major rôle aged 15 on 28 January 1730 in Philippe Néricault Destouches's comedy Le Médisant. Two months later she was received into the troupe of the Comédiens du roi where she "filled soubrette roles and several other characters in an inimitable manner".

She then remained successful for over thirty years before retiring to a house on rue de Vaugirard in Paris in 1763. There she held family celebrations and received poets and writers such as Antoine-Marin Lemierre, Claude Joseph Dorat and Germain-François Poullain de Saint-Foix. She even posthumously became the lead character in Mademoiselle Dangeville, comédie en 1 acte mêlée de chant, a vaudeville by Charles de Livry and Ferdinand de Villeneuve, premiered in the Théâtre du Palais-Royal on 10 April 1838.
