= Marie-Geneviève Dupré =

French actress

Marie-Geneviève Dupré, stage name Mademoiselle Grandval (1711–1783), was a French stage actress.

She was engaged at the Comédie-Française in 1734. She became a Sociétaires of the Comédie-Française in 1734. She retired in 1760.

She played grandes coquettes (great coquettes) and secondes amoureuses (secondary love heroines) as well as supporting roles in tragedies.
