= Madame Bellecour =

French actress (1730–1799)

Rose Perrine le Roy de la Corbinaye (December 10, 1730 – August 5, 1799) was a French actress, best known under the name of Madame Bellecour.

== Biography ==
Le Roy was born at Lamballe as the daughter of an artillery officer. Under the stage name of “an itinerant comic actor” Beaumenard, le Roy made her first Paris appearance in 1743 as Gogo in Charles Simon Favart's Le Coq du village. After a year at the Opéra-Comique, she played in several companies, including that of Marshal Saxe, who is said to have been not insensible to her charms. In 1749, she made her debut at the Comédie-Française as Dorine in Tartuffe, and her success was immediate.

Le Roy retired in 1756, but after an absence of five years, during which she married Jean Claude Gilles Colson ("Bellecour"), she reappeared as Madame Bellecour, and continued her successes in soubrette parts in the plays of Molière and Jean-François Regnard. She retired finally at the age of sixty, but troubled times had put an end to the pension which she received from Louis XVI and from the theatre, and she died in abject poverty. There is a charming portrait of her owned by the Théâtre Français.

== See also ==
- Troupe of the Comédie-Française in 1790
