= Molière's company =

Molière's company (La Troupe de Molière) was the theatrical company which formed around Molière from 1648 onwards, when he was performing in the French provinces after the failure of the Illustre Théâtre in 1645. In 1658 the company moved to Paris and, after a successful performance on 24 October 1658 in front of Louis XIV at the Louvre, was allowed to share the large hall in the Hôtel du Petit-Bourbon with the Italian players of Tiberio Fiorillo. At this time Molière's company became known as the Théâtre de Monsieur, since their official sponsor was the King's brother Philippe, Duke of Orléans, known as Monsieur. When the Petit Bourbon was demolished in 1660 to make way for the eastern expansion of the Louvre, Molière's troupe was allowed to use the abandoned Théâtre du Palais-Royal. The latter theatre had originally been built by Cardinal Richelieu in 1641. After Molière's death in 1673, his widow Armande Béjart and the actor La Grange kept the remnants of the company together, merging with the players from the Théâtre du Marais and moving to the Théâtre de Guénégaud. In 1680 the troupe of the Hôtel de Bourgogne joined the players at the Guénégaud, giving birth to the Comédie-Française.

== Paris ==
In 1680, by order of Louis XIV, the troupe at the Hôtel de Bourgogne merged into those already gathered by Molière and the Théâtre du Marais. The larger company allowed daily shows, and even to play to the court and to the city on the same day. Thus the Comédie-Française was born.

== Actors ==
By date of joining the troupe:

== Repertoire ==
The company's repertoire was not mainly comic. In 1659, its first full year based in Paris, it put on (grouped by genre) the following plays, seemingly its provincial repertoire too:

=== Tragedy ===
It is notable there are more tragedies than comedies in the repertoire.

- Alcionée, by Pierre Du Ryer
- Le Cid, by Pierre Corneille
- Cinna, by Pierre Corneille
- Héraclius, by Pierre Corneille
- Horace, by Pierre Corneille
- Marianne, by Tristan L'Hermite
- La Mort de Crispe, by François de Grenaille
- La Mort de Pompée, by Pierre Corneille
- Oreste et Pilade, by François-Joseph de Chancel
- Rodogune, by Pierre Corneille
- Scévole, by Pierre du Ryer
- Venceslas, by Jean Rotrou
- Zénobie, by Jean Magnon

=== Tragi-comedy ===
- Don Bertrand de Cabrère, by Jean Rotrou

=== Comedy ===
- Le Campagnard, by Gillet de La Tessonerie
- La Folle Gageure, by François Le Métel de Boisrobert
- L’Héritier ridicule, by Paul Scarron
- Don Japhet d’Arménie, by Paul Scarron
- Jodelet ou le Maître valet, by Paul Scarron
- Jodelet prince, by Thomas Corneille
- Le Gouvernement de Sancho Pansa, by Guyon Guérin de Bouscal
- Le Médecin malgré lui, by Molière
- Le Menteur, by Pierre Corneille
- Les Visionnaires, by Desmarets de Saint-Sorlin.

=== Farce ===
It is also noteworthy that there are only three works by Molière himself in the company's repertoire at this point, though by 1673 30 of its 90 play repertoire were by him (many inspired by the comedies above).

- Gros-René écolier, by Molière
- Le Médecin volant, by Molière

== Sources ==
- Henry Lyonnet, Dictionnaire des comédiens français, Bibliothèque de la revue Universelle Internationale Illustrée, Paris et Genève, 1902–1908
- Pierre Larousse, Grand Dictionnaire Universel du XIXe siecle
- Théâtre complet de Molière, Le Livre de poche.
