= Marianne-Hélène de Mottes =

French actress

Marianne-Hélène de Mottes, stage name Mademoiselle Dufresne and Mademoiselle de La Motte (fl. 1722 – 1759), was a French stage actress.

She was engaged at the Comédie-Française in 1722. She became a Sociétaires of the Comédie-Française in 1722. She retired in 1759.

She initially played tragic queens but met her greatest success as a character actress, in which she had a long and successful career. She also played breeches roles.
