= Comédie-Française =

State theatre in Paris, France

- Théâtre-Français; Théâtre de la République
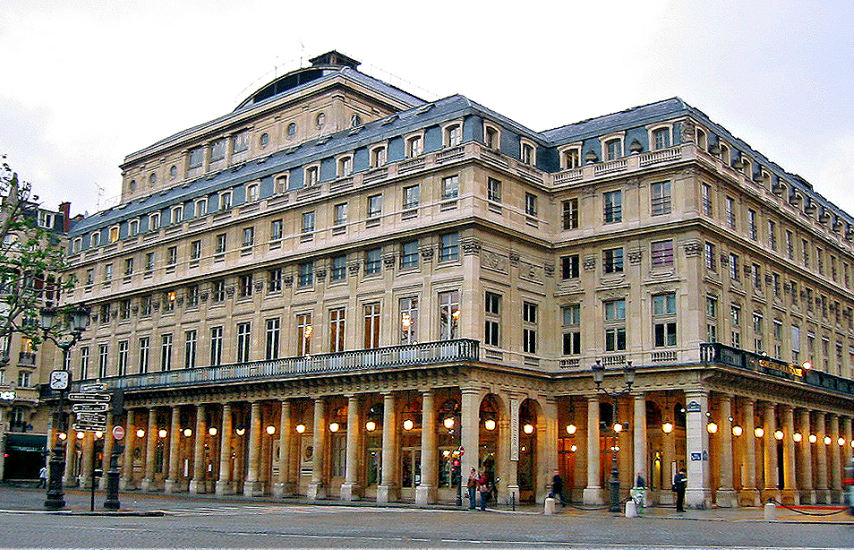
- Principal theatre of the Comédie-Française, the Salle Richelieu, seen from the intersection of the Rue de Richelieu with the Avenue de l'Opéra
- Founded: 1680
- Founder: Louis XIV
- Purpose: Theatre company
- Headquarters: 2 Rue de Richelieu, 1st arrondissement of Paris, France
- Coordinates: 48.8635°N 2.3362°E
- Website: www.comedie-francaise.fr

The Comédie-Française (French: [kɔmedi fʁɑ̃sɛːz]), or Théâtre-Français (French: [teɑtʁ(ə) fʁɑ̃sɛ]), is a state theatre in France. Founded in 1680, it is the oldest active theatre company in the world. Incorporated as a French state-controlled entity in 1995, it is one of the few in the nation and the only to have its own permanent troupe of actors. The company's primary venue is the Salle Richelieu, a part of the Palais-Royal complex located at 2 Rue de Richelieu on Place André-Malraux in the 1st arrondissement of Paris.

The theatre has also been known as the Théâtre de la République, and popularly as "La Maison de Molière" (The House of Molière). It acquired the latter name from the troupe of its best-known playwright, Molière, considered the patron of French actors. He died seven years before his troupe became known as the Comédie-Française, but the company continued to be known as "La Maison de Molière" even after the official change of name.

== History ==
The Comédie-Française was founded on 8 August 1680 by a decree of Louis XIV merging the only two Parisian acting troupes of the time, those of the Guénégaud Theatre and the Hôtel de Bourgogne. On the death of Molière in 1673, the troupe at the Guénégaud had been formed by a merger of the Théâtre du Marais and the Troupe de Molière. Two years later they received a royal grant of 12,000 livres per year; and seven years later they received their present designation.

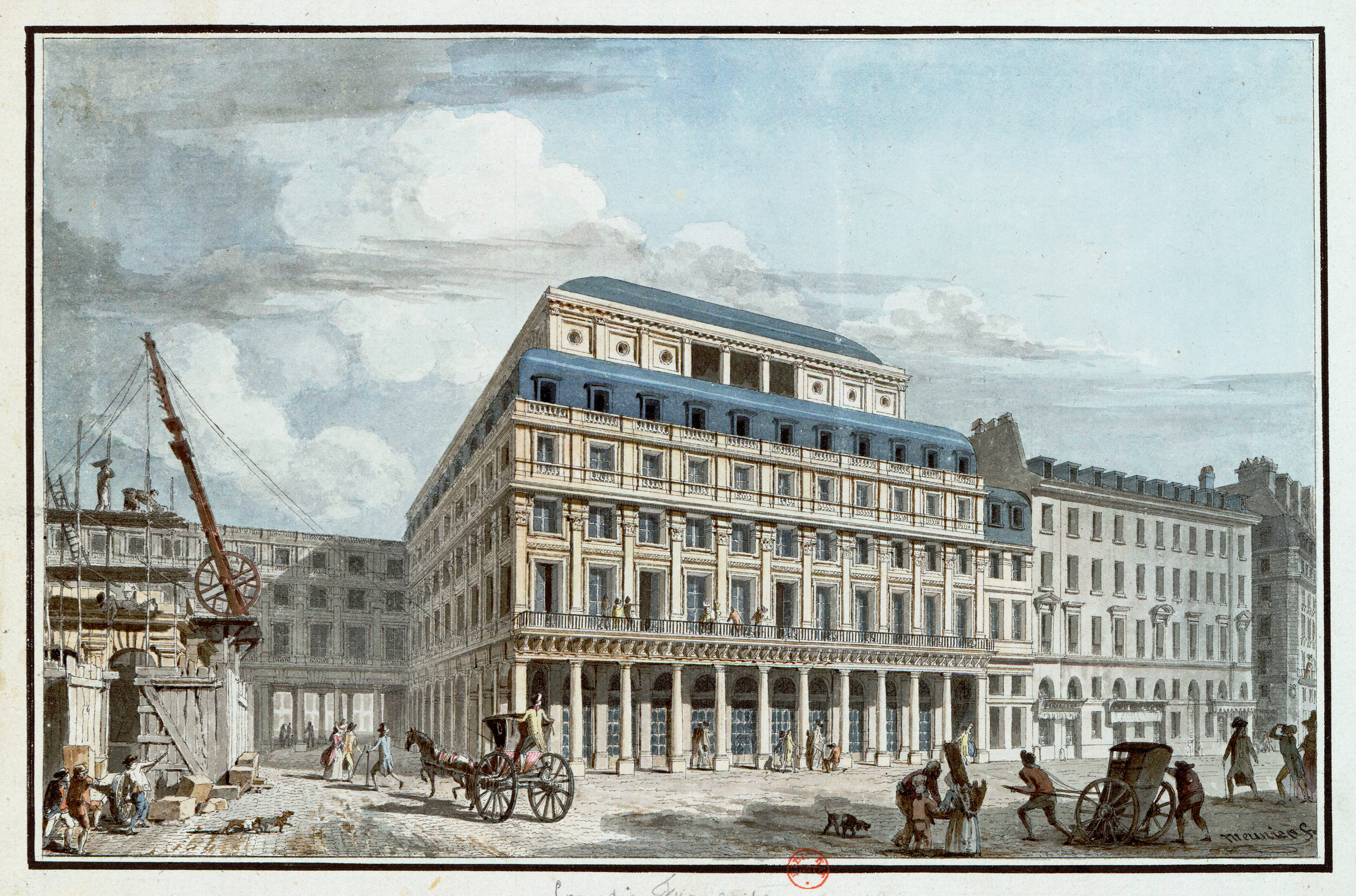
Comédie-Française, late 18th century

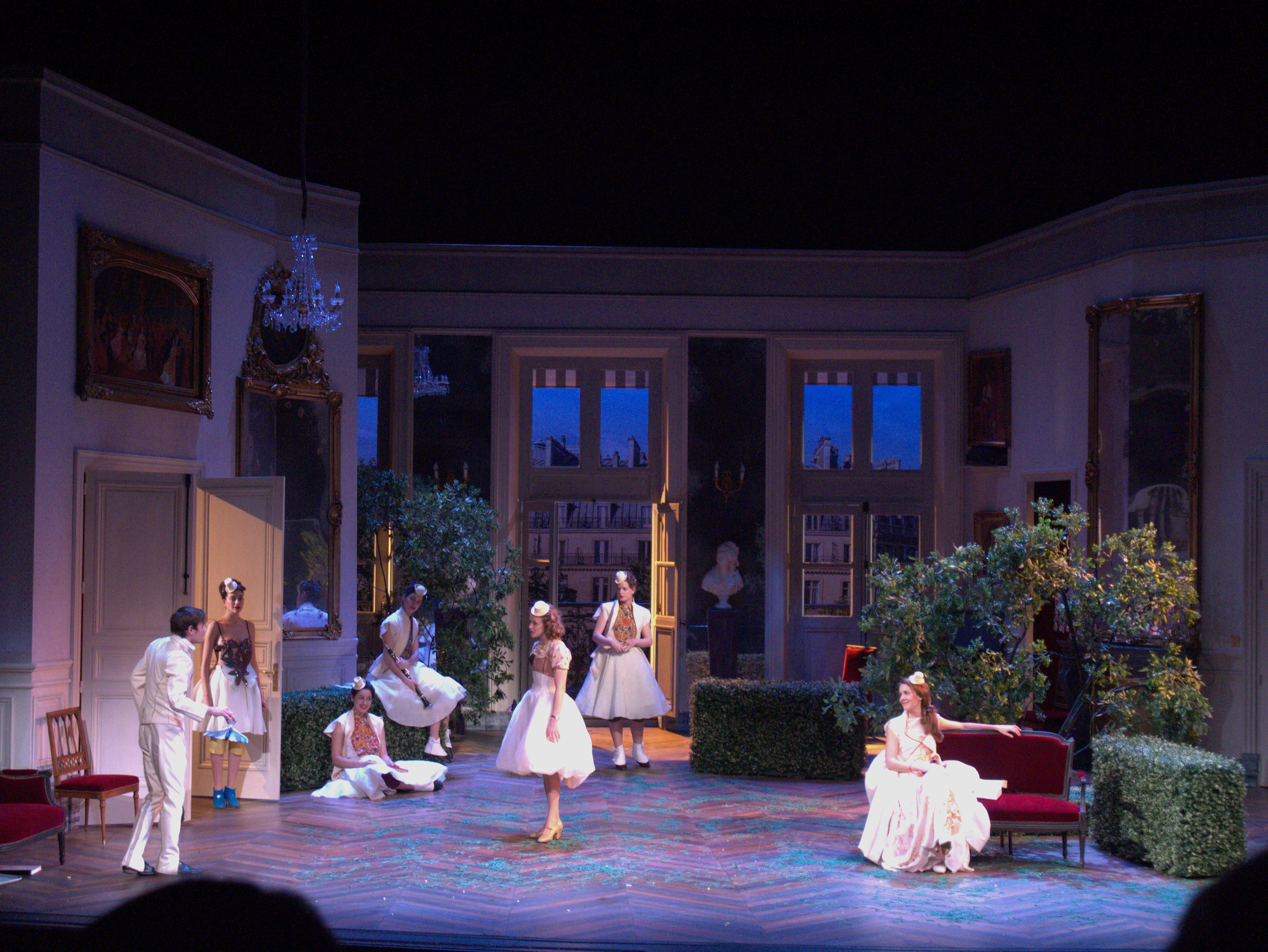
A performance of Marivaux's La Double Inconstance in 2015

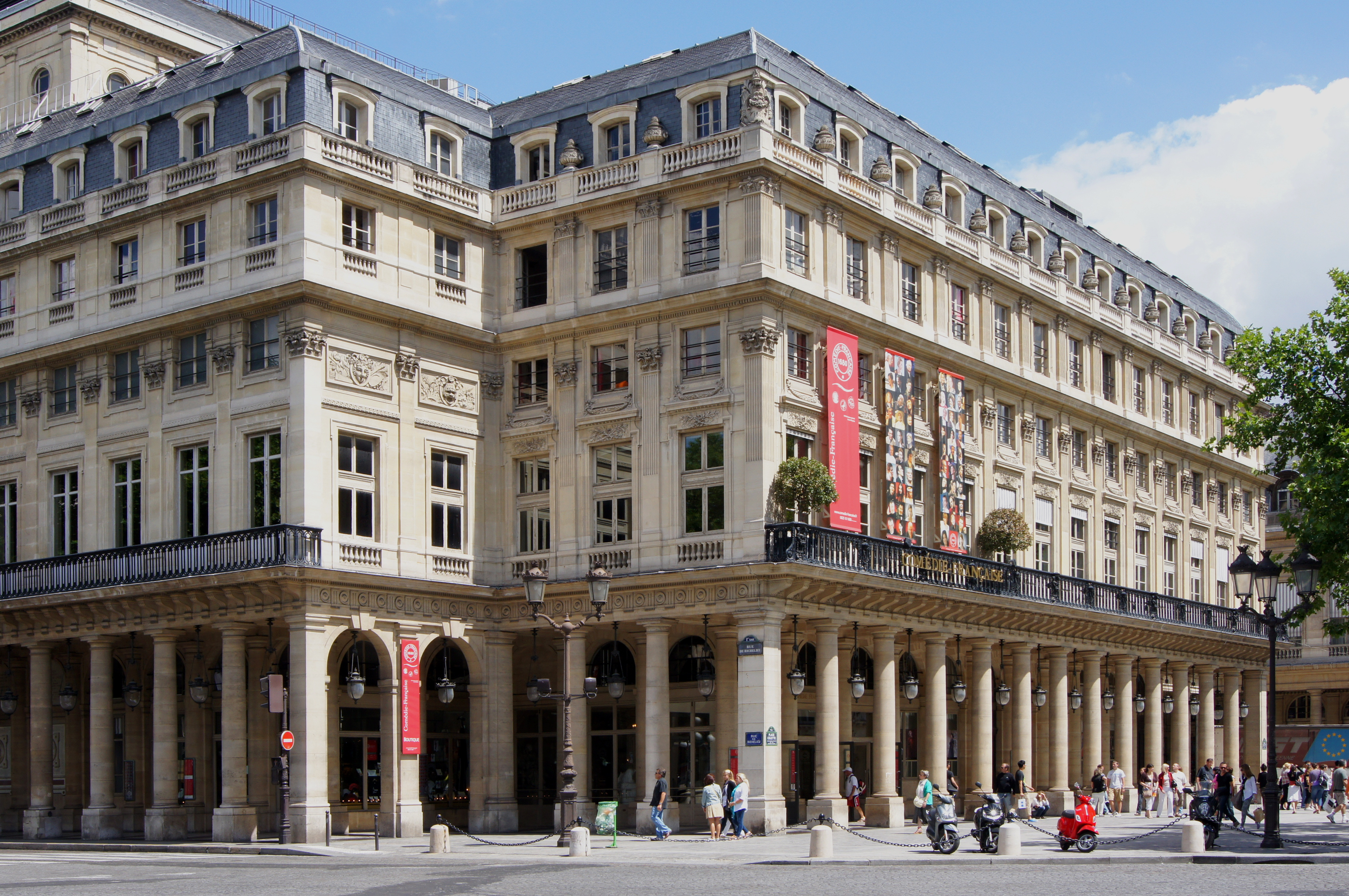
Iconic corner, entry to the Salle Richelieu, 2009

The combined company gave its first performance on 25 August 1680 at the Guénégaud. Its leading actors included Molière's widow, Armande Béjart, her husband, Guérin d'Estriché, La Grange, Mlle Champmeslé, Baron, Hauteroche, and Raymond Poisson. The repertoire consisted of the collection of theatrical works by Molière and Jean Racine, along with a few works by Pierre Corneille, Paul Scarron and Jean Rotrou.

In the 18th century, the Comédie-Française was often enjoyed by the French nobility, an expensive luxury.

On the performance of Joseph Chénier's anti-monarchical play Charles IX in 1789, violent political discussions arose among the performers, ultimately splitting the company into two sections: the Royalists, renamed the "Théâtre de la Nation", and the Republicans led by the young tragedian Talma establishing the "Théâtre de la République" on the site of the present building in the Rue de Richelieu.

On 16 April 1790, the theatre presented the world premiere of Pierre Laujon's Le Couvent, ou les Fruits du caractère et de l'éducation; the first French play to feature an all-women cast. On 3 September 1793, during the French Revolution, the Théâtre de la Nation was closed by order of the Committee of Public Safety for putting on the allegedly seditious play, Pamela, and the actors were imprisoned, though gradually released later. On 31 May 1799, the new government made the Salle Richelieu available and allowed the actors to reconstitute the troupe.

The Comédie-Française today has a repertoire of 3,000 works and three theatres in Paris (Salle Richelieu, next to the Palais Royal; théâtre du Vieux-Colombier; Studio-Théâtre).

=== COVID-19 pandemic ===
Since October 2020, and because of the COVID-19 pandemic, the Comédie-Française had to close as it is the case for all other theaters in France. The Comédie-Française having a permanent troupe of actors, it was decided to switch temporarily to an online program, including readings of the full text of In Search of Lost Time, and an online initiative called Théâtre à la table where actors of the troupe play works in the repertoire after a one week rehearsal.

Online attendance for this initiative was unexpectedly high, including people outside of Paris and in other countries.

In May 2021 Éric Ruf, the managing director of the Comédie-Française, declared that 30% of the public of the online program never went to the Comédie-Française, and that they would continue this program even after the reopening.

== Theatre buildings ==
The Comédie-Française has had several homes since its inception in 1680 in the Salle Guénégaud. In 1689, it was established in a theatre across from the Café Procope. From 1770 to 1782, the Comédie-Française performed in the theatre in the royal palace of the Tuileries. In 1782, the company moved into the Salle du Faubourg Saint-Germain, designed by architects Marie-Joseph Peyre and Charles De Wailly and located on the site of today's Odéon. Since 1799, the Comédie-Française has been housed in the Salle Richelieu (architect Victor Louis) at 2, rue de Richelieu. This theatre was enlarged and modified in the 1800s, then rebuilt in 1900 after a severe fire. The actress Jane Henriot was the only casualty of the fire.

== Theatrical troupe ==
The membership of the theatrical troupe is divided into sociétaires and pensionnaires. The former are regular members of the organisation and as such receive a pension after 20 years of service, while the latter are paid actors who may, after a certain length of service, become sociétaires. The names of nearly all the great actors and dramatists of France have, at some time in their career, been associated with that of the Comédie-Française.

=== Homage to Molière ===
Every year on 15 January, the company performs an "Homage to Molière" on the anniversary of his christening and possibly his birth. Following that evening's performance, which nowadays is free, all members of the troupe, and since 2009 of its academy, assemble on the stage behind a bust of Molière, wearing costumes of their choice from the theatre's repertoire. They first process in ranks to bow to the audience's applause. Each member then says a line from Molière's plays, also applauded. In conclusion, the dean introduces to the audience the new members of the academy, the new pensionnaires, and the new sociétaires, and has the departing sociétaires honoraires applauded.

The tradition was started in 1773 on the centenary of Molière's death. In 1821, it was moved to his then recently discovered christening date, and the next year approached its present form as the final scene of a play specially written by Justin Gensoul, Le Ménage de Molière. In the 19th century, The Imaginary Invalid was often performed on that date, as the final divertissement made it possible for the entire troupe to appear. Similar homages became popular at the Odéon, as well as in other theatres when these lost their privilege to perform Molière in 1864; however, the Comédie-Française is the only one that has maintained it.

The défilé (procession) of the Paris Opera Ballet, created in the 20th century, bears similarities to the homage.

== Administrators of the Comédie-Française ==
The chief administrator of the Comédie-Française has been given the title administrateur général since Simonis' term of 1850. Before that, a variety of titles were given.

== See also ==
- Troupe of the Comédie-Française in 1680
- Troupe of the Comédie-Française in 1752
- Troupe of the Comédie-Française in 1754
- Troupe of the Comédie-Française in 1755
- Troupe of the Comédie-Française in 1772
- Troupe of the Comédie-Française in 1790
- List of works by Henri Chapu. Bust of Alexandre Dumas Pere
- Battle of Hernani

== Bibliography ==
- Brockett, Oscar G.; Hildy, Franklin J. (2008). History of the Theatre, tenth edition. Boston: Pearson. ISBN 9780205511860.
- Clarke, Jan (1998). The Guénégaud Theatre in Paris (1673–1680). Volume One: Founding, Design and Production. Lewiston, New York: The Edwin Mellen Press. ISBN 9780773483927.
- Gaines, James F. (2002). The Molière Encyclopedia. Westport, Connecticut: Greenwood Press. ISBN 9780313312557.
- Hartnoll, Phyllis, editor (1983). The Oxford Companion to the Theatre (fourth edition). Oxford: Oxford University Press. ISBN 9780192115461.
- Laugier, Eugène (1853). Documents historiques sur la Comédie-Française pendant le règne de S. M. l'Empereur Napoléon Ier. Paris: Firmin-Didot. Copies 1, 2, and 3 at Internet Archive.
- Maurice, Charles (1860). Le Théâtre-Français, monuments et dépendances, second edition, revised and enlarged. Paris: Garnier. Copies 1 and 2 at Internet Archive.
- Sanjuan, Agathe; Poirson, Martial (2018). Comédie-Française: une histoire du théâtre. Paris: Éditions du Seuil. ISBN 9782021343755.
- Trowbridge, Simon (2020). The Comédie-Française from Molière to Éric Ruf. Oxford: Englance Press. ISBN 9781999730550.
- Wild, Nicole (2012). Dictionnaire des théâtres parisiens (1807–1914). Lyon: Symétrie. ISBN 9782914373487. OCLC 826926792.
