= Anne-Marie (given name) =

Anne-Marie is a French feminine given name. It combines the two respective given names of Anne, and Marie. It is traditionally associated with Christianity because it joins the names of Jesus's grandmother Anne and his mother Mary. It may refer to:

== People ==
=== Anne-Marie or Anne Marie ===
- Queen Anne-Marie of Greece (born 1946), the wife of King Constantine II of Greece
- Anne Marie d'Orléans (1669–1728), Queen of Sardinia
- Anne Marie Louise d'Orléans, Duchess of Montpensier (1627-1693), French heiress of a vast fortune
- Anne-Marie Albiach (1937–2012), French poet and translator
- Anne-Marie Alonzo (1951–2005), Canadian playwright, poet, novelist, critic and publisher
- Anne Marie Becraft, American educator and nun
- Anne-Marie Beukes (born 1950), South African professor of Applied Linguistics
- Anne-Marie Cadieux (born 1963), Canadian actress, film director and screenwriter
- Anne-Marie Comparini (born 1947), French politician
- Anne Marie Cyr, French Canadian singer and TV presenter
- Anne-Marie David (born 1952), French singer
- Anne Marie DeCicco-Best (born 1964), 60th mayor of London, Ontario, Canada
- Anne Marie d'Orléans (1669-1728), Queen consort of Sardinia
- Anne-Marie Duff (born 1970), British actress
- Anne-Marie Ekström (born 1947), Swedish politician
- Anne-Marie Escoffier (born 1942), French politician and a member of the Senate of France
- Anne-Marie Essy Raggi (1918-2004), Ivorian politician
- Anne-Marie Fox, a Playboy magazine Playmate of the Month
- Anne-Marie Garat (1946–2022), French novelist
- Anne-Marie Gélinas (born 1964), Canadian film, documentary and television producer
- Anne-Marie Goumba (born 1954), Central African Republic politician
- Anne-Marie Green (born 1978), Canadian-born American news anchor
- Anne-Marie Helder, British singer-songwriter
- Anne-Marie Hurst, lead vocalist for the groups The Elements, Skeletal Family and Ghost Dance
- Anne-Marie Hutchinson (1957–2020), British lawyer
- Anne-Marie Huguenin (1875–1943), Canadian journalist
- Anne-Marie Idrac (born 1951), current French Minister of State for foreign trade
- Anne-Marie Imafidon (born 1990), British-Nigerian social entrepreneur and computer scientist
- Anne-Marie Irving (born 1977), New Zealand former field hockey goalkeeper
- Anne-Marie Javouhey (1779–1851), French nun who founded the Sisters of Saint Joseph of Cluny
- Anne-Marie Johnson (born 1960), American actress and impressionist
- Anne-Marie Kantengwa (born 1953), Rwandan Patriotic Front deputy
- Anne-Marie Lacroix (1732–1802), French writer
- Anne-Marie Lizin (1949–2015), Belgian politician
- Anne-Marie Loriot (born 1956), French sprint canoer
- Anne-Marie Losique, Canadian television producer, television host and singer
- Anne Marie Malone (born 1960), Canadian long distance runner
- Anne-Marie Marchand (1929–2005), French costume designer
- Anne-Marie Martin (born 1957), Canadian actress and writer
- Anne-Marie Mediwake, Canadian television news anchor
- Anne-Marie Miéville (born 1945), Swiss filmmaker
- Anne-Marie Mineur (born 1967), Dutch politician
- Anne Marie Morris (born 1957), British politician
- Anne Marie Murphy (disambiguation)
- Anne-Marie Ngouyombo (born 1955), Central African politician
- Anne-Marie Nicholson, better known as Anne-Marie (born 1990), British singer and songwriter
- Anne-Marie Nzié (1932–2016), Cameroonian bikutsi singer
- Anne-Marie Pålsson (born 1951), Swedish politician
- Anne-Marie Payet (born 1949), a member of the Senate of France
- Anne-Marie Ruddock (born 1963), English singer
- Annemarie Schimmel (1922–2003), German scholar of Islam
- Anne-Marie Sirois, Canadian visual artist, writer and film director
- Anne-Marie Slaughter (born 1958), Director of Policy Planning for the U.S. State Department
- Anne-Marie Walters (1923–1998), WAAF officer and Special Operations Executive agent during the Second World War
- Anne-Marie Withenshaw, Canadian television and radio personality

=== Ann-Marie, Ann Marie or Annmarie ===
- Ann Marie (born 1995), American musician
- Annmarie Adams, Canadian architectural historian
- Ann Marie Buerkle (born 1951), American politician
- Ann Marie Calabria (born 1947), American jurist
- Ann Marie Calhoun (born 1979), American violinist
- Ann-Marie Campbell (born 1965), Jamaican-American businessperson
- Ann Marie Carlton, American chemist
- Ann-Marie Cording (born 1959), English high jumper
- Ann Marie Craig, Canadian neurologist
- Ann Marie DeAngelo, American choreographer
- Ann Marie Doory (born 1954), American politician
- Ann-Marie Fagerström (born 1953), Swedish politician
- Ann-Marie Farren (born 1971), English snooker player
- Ann Marie Fleming (born 1962), Canadian filmmaker, writer, and visual artist
- Ann Marie Flynn (1938–2021), American high jumper
- Ann Marie Ganness, writer, journalist, former TV news anchor from Trinidad and Tobago
- Ann-Marie Gyllenspetz (1932–1999), Swedish actress
- Ann-Marie Heatherson (born 1984), English footballer
- Ann-Marie Hepler (born 1996), Marshallese swimmer
- Ann-Marie Hermans, Australian politician
- Ann-Marie Holmes, Irish engineer
- Ann-Marie Ivars, Swedish-speaking Finnish writer
- Ann-Marie Karlsson (born 1968), Swedish cross-country skier
- Ann Marie Kimball, American physician
- Ann-Marie MacDonald (born 1958), Canadian playwright and actor
- Ann Marie McGlynn (born 1980), Irish long distance runner
- Ann Marie McIff Allen (born 1972), American judge
- Ann Marie McNamara, American microbiologist
- Ann-Marie Norlin (born 1979), Swedish footballer
- Ann-Marie Nyroos, Finnish diplomat
- Ann-Marie Pelchat (born 1974), Canadian freestyle skier
- Ann-Marie Pendrill, Swedish physicist
- Ann-Marie Pfiffner (born 1969), American sports shooter
- Ann-Marie Said (born 1994), Maltese footballer
- Annmarie Sairrino, American producer
- Ann Marie Sastry, American businessperson
- Ann Marie Starr, Irish camogie player
- Ann-Marie Vaz (born 1966), Jamaican politician
- Ann-Marie Wallsten (born 1943), Swedish orienteering competitor
- Ann-Marie Williams, Belizean public policy advisor, administrator and journalist
- Ann-Marie Wilson, British anti-FGM activist
- AnnMarie Wolpe (1930–2018), South African anti-apartheid activist
- Ann Marie Yasin, art professor in California, United States

== Fictional characters ==
- Anne-Marie Byrne, in the BBC medical drama Holby City
- Anne-Marie Cortez, a mutant in the Marvel Comics Universe
- Anne-Marie, in the film All Dogs Go To Heaven
- Annemarie Johansen, the main character of the novel Number the Stars

== See also ==
- Ann Marie, protagonist of the American television situation comedy That Girl
- Marie Anne
