= Marie Anne =

Marie Anne, Marie-Anne or Marie-Ann is a feminine compound given name which may refer to:

== Aristocrats ==
- Princess Marie Anne of France (1664-1664?), daughter of King Louis XIV of France
- Infanta Marie Anne of Portugal (1861–1942), Portuguese infanta and Grand Duchess consort of Luxembourg
- Marie Anne de Bourbon (disambiguation)
- Marie Anne de La Trémoille, princesse des Ursins (1642–1722), an influential lady in the Spanish royal court during Philip V's early reign
- Marie Anne de Mailly (1717–1744), Duchess of Châteauroux and mistress of King Louis XV of France
- Marie Anne Mancini (1649–1714), Duchess of Bouillon and niece of Cardinal Mazarin

== Other ==
- Marie-Anne Asselin (1888–1971), French–Canadian opera singer and voice teacher
- Marie-Anne Barbel (1704–1793), French-Canadian businesswoman
- Marie Anne Barbier (1664/1670?–1742), French playwright and writer
- Marie Anne Blondin (1809–1890), Canadian teacher and Mother Superior
- Marie-Anne Bouchiat (born 1934), French physicist
- Marie-Anne de Bovet (1855–?), French writer
- Marie Anne Carrelet de Marron (1724–1778), French painter, ceramic decorator, poet and playwright
- Marie-Anne Chapdelaine (born 1962), French politician
- Marie-Anne Chazel (born 1951), French actress, screenwriter and director
- Marie Anne Chiment, American costume designer
- Marie-Anne Cohendet (born 1994), French political scientist
- Marie-Anne Collot (1748–1821), French sculptor
- Marie-Anne Colson-Malleville (1892–1971), French film director
- Marie Anne de Cupis de Camargo (1710–1770), French–Belgian dancer
- Marie-Anne Desmarest (1904–1973), French writer
- Marie-Anne Detourbay (1837–1908), French salon-holder
- Marie Anne Doublet (1677–1771), French scholar, writer and salonnière
- Marie-Anne Pauline Du Mont (died 1790), French actress
- Marie-Anne Fragonard (1745–1823), French artist
- Marie-Anne Frison-Roche (born 1959), French economist
- Marie-Anne Gaboury (1780–1875), first woman of European descent to settle in what is now western Canada
- Marie-Anne Horthemels (1682–1727), French artist
- Marie Anne Isler Béguin (born 1956), French politician
- Marie-Anne de Lachassaigne (1747–1820), French actress
- Marie Anne Lenormand (1772–1843), French bookseller, necromancer, fortune-teller and cartomancer
- Marie-Anne Leroudier (1838–1908), French embroiderer
- Marie-Anne Libert (1782–1865), Belgian botanist
- Marie-Anne Montchamp (born 1957), Secretary of State for Solidarities and Social Cohesion in the French government
- Marie-Anne Pierrette Paulze (1758–1836), French chemist
- Marie-Anne Paulze Lavoisier (1758–1836), French chemist and artist
- Marie Anne Victoire Pigeon (1724–1767), French mathematician
- Marie-Anne de Roumier-Robert (1705–1771), French writer
- Marie-Anne Rousselet (1732–1826), French engraver and illustrator
- Marie Anne Simonis (1758–1831), Belgian textile industrialist
- Marie-Anne Vandermoere (born 1966), Belgian rower
- Marie Anne Véronèse (1701–1782), Franco-Italian actress
- Marie-Ann Yemsi (born 1963), German-Cameroonian curator

== See also ==
- Marie-Anne-Louise Taschereau (1743–1825), Canadian Catholic abbess, nun and teacher
- Marianne (disambiguation)
- Maria Anna of Spain (1606–1646), Infanta of Spain, Holy Roman Empress, and Queen of Hungary and Bohemia
- Mariana (name), another given name
- Mary Ann (disambiguation)
- Anne-Marie (given name)
