= NLS =

NLS may refer to:

== Computing ==
- NLS (computer system), a 1960s computing collaboration
- National Language Support (or Native Language Support), in HP software

== Organisations ==
=== Government ===
- National Language Services, South Africa
- National Longitudinal Surveys, U.S.
- National Lifeguard Service, Canada

=== Businesses ===
- Non-Linear Systems, electronics manufacturer
- Nautilus, Inc., stock symbol NLS, fitness products manufacturer

=== Education ===
- North Leamington School, England
- Nottingham Law School, England
- National Law School of India University, Bangalore

=== Librarial ===
- National Library Service for the Blind and Print Disabled, American mail service
- National Library of Scotland
- National Life Stories, at the British Library

=== Political ===
- Labour Students, formally called National Labour Students

== Science and technology ==
- Nuclear localization signal, in biology
- Nonlinear Schrödinger equation, in physics
- Non-linear least squares, in statistics, a method used in regression analysis

=== Spaceflight ===
- Nanosatellite Launch System, based at the University of Toronto
- National Launch System, a 1991 Space Shuttle alternative study

== Transport ==
- Nailsea and Backwell railway station station code NLS, England
- Niles (Amtrak station) station code NLS, Michigan, United States

== Other ==
- Nimrod Line Squadron, former military service unit at RAF Kinloss
- National League System, in English football
- Nürburgring Langstrecken-Serie, a motorsport endurance series held at the Nürburgring. Formerly known as VLN (Veranstaltergemeinschaft Langstreckenpokal Nürburgring)
- New Face of Serbia (Novo lice Srbije), a political party in Serbia
