= Anne-Marie (disambiguation) =

Anne-Marie (born 1990) is an English singer and songwriter.

Anne-Marie may also refer to:

- Queen Anne-Marie of Greece, former Queen consort of Greece
- Anne-Marie (film), a 1936 French drama film directed by Raymond Bernard
- Anne-Marie (given name), including a list of people with the name
- Anne-Marie, a 1981 book by French writer Lucien Bodard
- 3667 Anne-Marie, an asteroid

== See also ==
- Ann Marie (born 1995), American singer-songwriter
