= Institut d'études politiques de Lyon =

Political science school in Lyon, France

Coordinates: 45°44′49″N 4°50′8.9″E

Institut d'Études Politiques de Lyon
- Lyon Institute of Political Sciences
- Motto: Virtute duce comite fortuna
- Motto in English: Under the guidance of valor, accompanied by good fortune
- Established: 1948
- Affiliations: Conférence des Grandes écoles, National Foundation of Political Science, University of Lyon, IDEX (Initiative D'EXcellence)
- Director: Hélène Surrel
- Academic staff: 310 (62 full-time)
- Students: 1,441
- Location: Lyon, France
- Campus: Metropolitan
- Campus size: 9,500 square meters
- Website: www.sciencespo-lyon.fr

The Institut d'Études politiques de Lyon (French pronunciation: [ɛ̃stity detyd pɔlitik də ljɔ̃], Lyon Institute of Political Studies) also known as Sciences Po Lyon ([sjɑ̃s po ljɔ̃]), is a grande école located in Lyon, France. It is one of eleven Institutes of Political Studies in France, and was established in 1948 by Charles de Gaulle's provisional government following the model of the École Libre des Sciences Politiques (Sciences Po). It is located at the Centre Berthelot within the buildings of a former military health college and operates as an autonomous institution within the University of Lyon. It is the first Institute of Political Studies to have joined the prestigious Conférence des Grandes écoles.

Sciences Po Lyon has established partnerships with more than 160 universities abroad.

== History ==
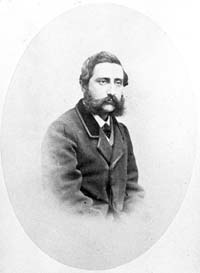
Émile Boutmy, ELSP founder

Sciences Po Lyon was established following an executive decree by General de Gaulle in 1948. In common with the other instituts d'études politiques (IEP, English: Institutes of Political Studies) in France, it was modelled on the former École Libre des Sciences Politiques (ELSP) in Paris. It is considered as a French "Grande École" or elite school and remains an autonomous body within the University of Lyon.

The ELSP was established as a private institution in 1872 by Emile Boutmy (along with Hippolyte Taine, Ernest Renan, Albert Sorel, Paul Leroy-Beaulieu and René Stourm), was dissolved in 1945 following a demand coming primarily from the French Communist Party, the strongest political force at that time, as well as other political figures not affiliated with it, such as Jean-Pierre Cot and André Philip. J.P. Cot and André Philip were both members of the Parliamentary Committee on the reform of the State. The ELSP, known then as Sciences Po, was indeed considered as an institution providing the sole Parisian bourgeoisie with a quasi-monopoly over access to the most prestigious positions in the French civil service (the Grands corps de l'Etat or high administrative bodies). More to the point, the ELSP was discredited for having trained many senior civil servants who quickly supported and were actually the backbone of the Vichy France from July 1940 to August 1944.

As per ordinance 45–2284, issued by Charles de Gaulle on 9 October 1945, the ELSP was thus replaced by the Institut d'Etudes Politiques de l'Université de Paris. The Fondation Nationale des Sciences Politiques was established by the same ordinance in order to oversee it as well as the other instituts d'études politiques – including the IEP in Lyon in 1948 – subsequently established throughout the French territory. In order to democratize and rationalize access to the senior civil service, the "National School of Administration" (École nationale d'administration) was created on the basis of a project developed by Michel Debré and Emmanuel Monick. Otherwise, this project was not entirely in the spirit of the programme developed by the National Council of the Resistance (Conseil National de la Resistance or CNR) during World War II, which was willing to sanction and nationalize the ELSP. Was established instead a tripartite and unbalanced structure composed of the FNSP, the ENA, the IEP in Paris (1945) and the subsequent IEPs in Strasbourg (1946), Grenoble (1948), Lyon (1948), Bordeaux (1948), Toulouse (1948), Aix (1956), Rennes (1991) and Lille (1991). While the FNSP is a private foundation, the latter institutions are indeed public.

The vocation of the French instituts d'études politiques has been the study and research of contemporary political science. They are quite distinct from the other traditional elite French schools, in particular the highly specialized Grandes Ecoles in business and engineering, given their multi-disciplinary approach to teaching. All students at the IEPs study a compulsory curriculum that is highly practical and multidisciplinary during its first years and focuses on the full range of the social sciences and humanities. The IEPs, being modelled on the former ELSP, are known in the familiar language under the name of Sciences Po, followed by the name of the city where they are located.

According to article 2 of an 18 December 1989 decree on the status of the instituts d'études politiques, their mission is to contribute to the training of higher civil servants as well as executives in the public, para-public and private sectors, notably in the state and decentralized communities as well as to develop the research in political and administrative sciences.

The Sciences Po approach and style inspired many universities abroad such as the London School of Economics.

== Location ==
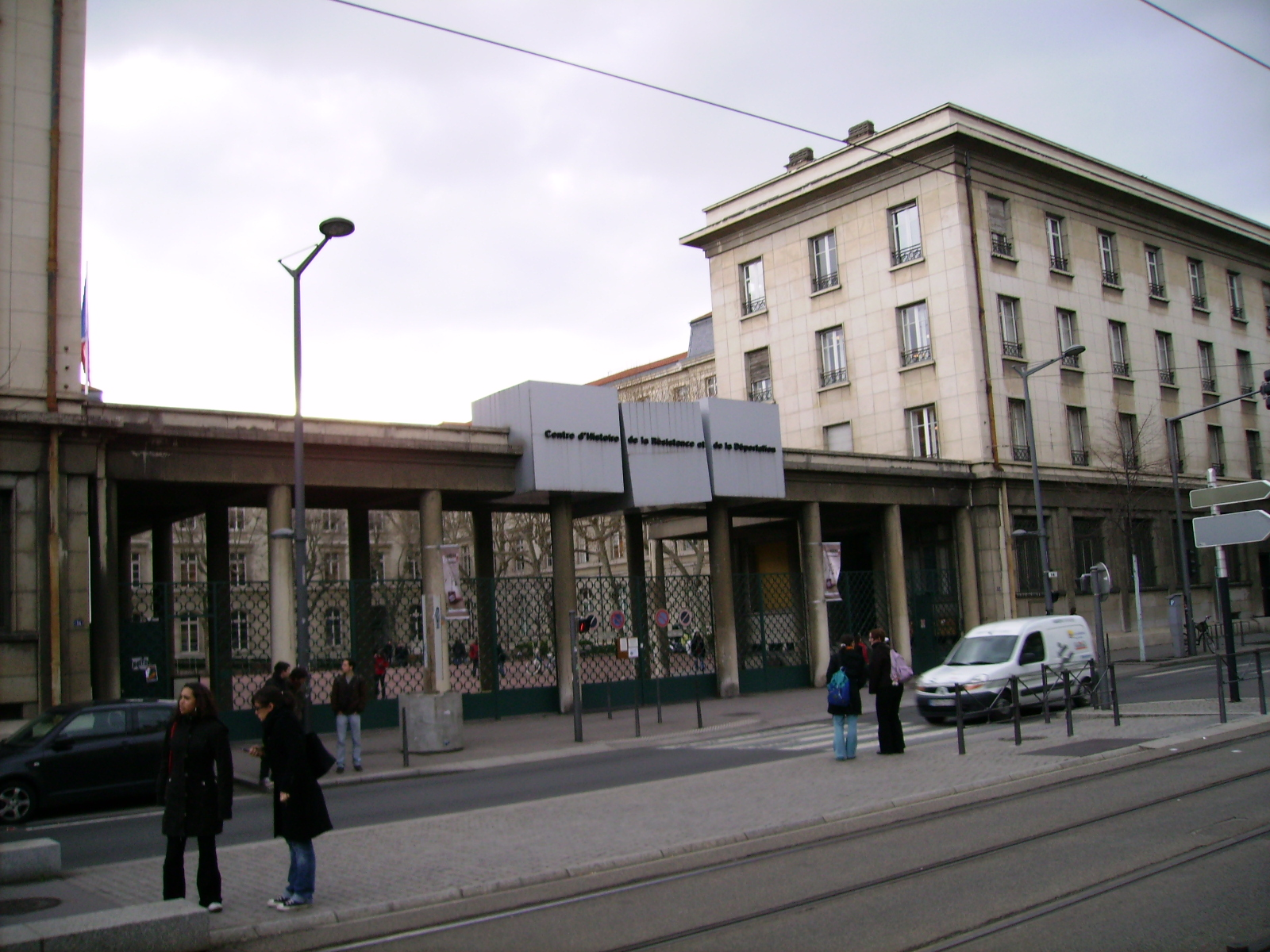
The main entrance to the Centre Berthelot. On the right side of the Peristyle, the Sciences Po Lyon library and its study rooms

=== Main campus ===
It is located at the Centre Berthelot within the buildings of a former military health college, which was used during World War II by the then Lyon's Gestapo chief, Klaus Barbie, to torture resistance members, including Jean Moulin. The same buildings were also used by the Ecole Polytechnique from 1940 to 1943 after the school decided to relocate to Lyon (then in the free zone) from its headquarters in the occupied Paris.

Sciences Po occupies an area of 9,500 square meters, contiguous to the premises of the Center for the History of the Resistance and Deportation ("Centre d'histoire de la résistance et de la déportation").

=== Satellite campus in Saint-Etienne ===
Sciences Po Lyon has established a satellite campus for a curriculum specialized in Russian affairs in Saint-Etienne at Jean Monnet University.

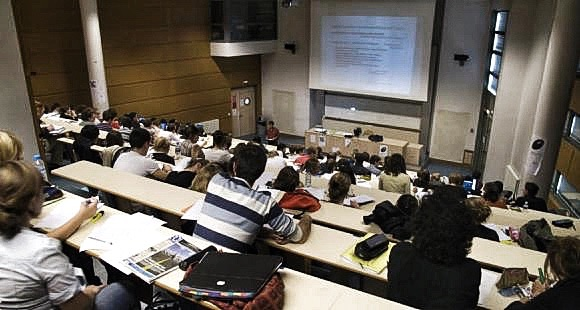
The Great auditorium.

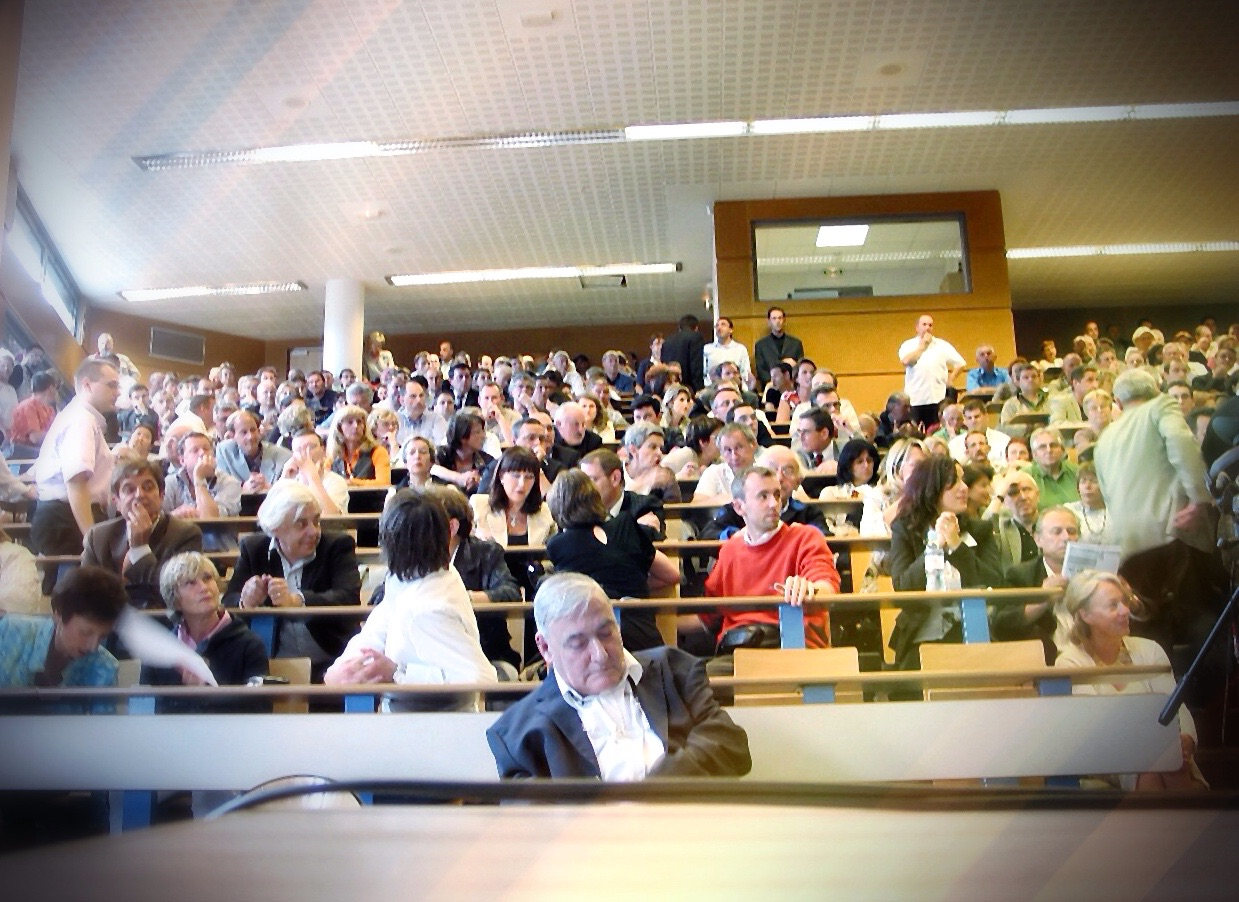
The Great Auditorium - View from the platform.

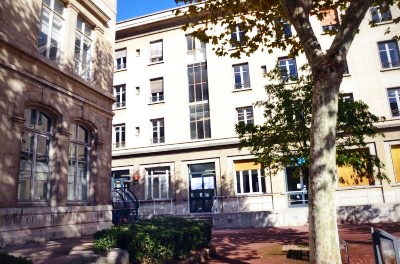
The Library.

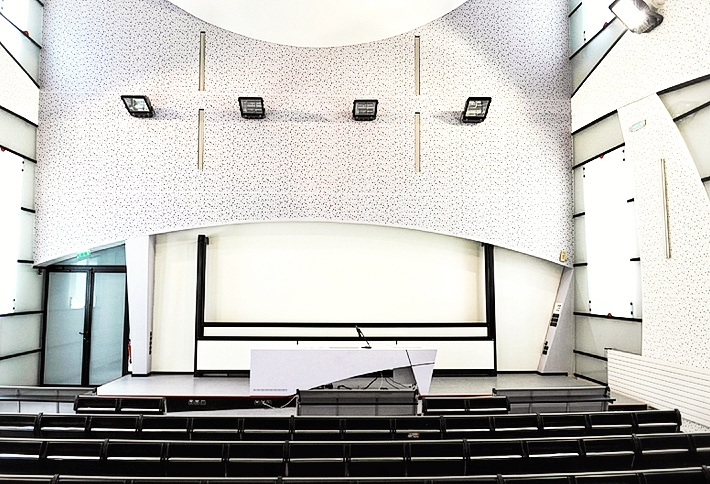
Leclair Lecture Hall, 2013 Saint-Gobain Gypsum International Award. Architect: Raphaël Pistilli.

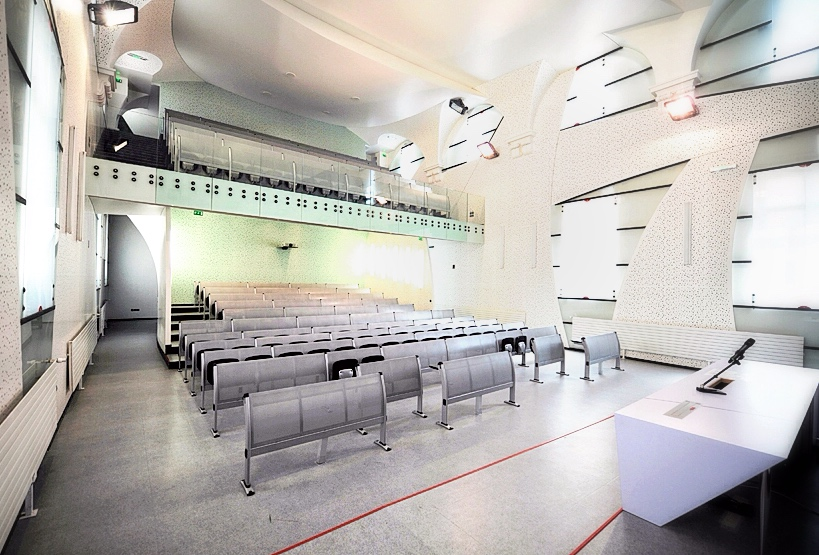
Leclair Lecture Hall - A former coat of arms room.

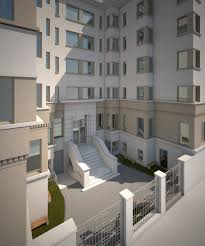
Sciences Po Lyon's campus at the Maison de l'Université in Saint-Etienne

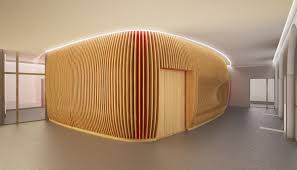
Sciences Po Lyon's campus in Saint-Etienne - Entrance to main amphitheater

== Student selection ==
=== The Heptaconcours ===
Student selection is based on grades obtained in the French baccalauréat (the examination taken at the end of secondary school) and at a competitive written examination called the Heptaconcours (acceptance/selection rate is currently less 10%), which is co-organized with six other institutes, respectively in Aix-en-Provence, Lille, Rennes, Saint-Germain-en-Laye, Strasbourg, and Toulouse. Selected students can then decide in which of these seven institutes they will enrol.

=== Special examination for Chinese students ===
Under the patronage of Christine Lagarde, IMF managing director and a graduate from Sciences Po Aix, Sciences Po Lyon along with the other IEPs of the Heptaconcours, have now organized a competitive examination for Chinese French-speaking students, who will be then able to attend the last two years of the Sciences Po academic curriculum.

=== Special examination centres for French students abroad ===
Since 2014, French students abroad have been able to take the Heptacononcours in four examination centres established abroad: Bangkok, Thailand; Bogota, Colombia; Casablanca, Morocco; Dubai, UAE. Other centres have also been open in the French overseas territories: Pointe-à-Pitre, Guadeloupe; Cayenne, Guyane: Tahiti, French Polynesia; Fort-de-France, Martinique; Saint-Denis, La Réunion.

== Ranking and reputation ==
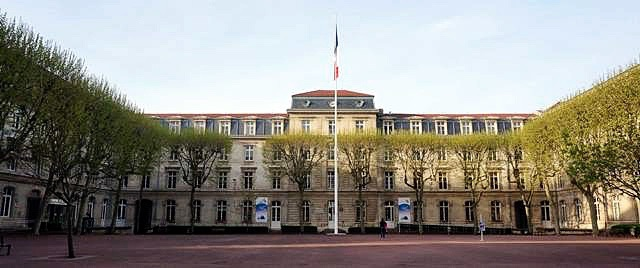
Sciences Po Lyon administrative building, which was used by École Polytechnique from 1940 to 1943

=== Ranking ===
Contrary to a general belief, there is no official ranking amongst the various IEPs in France. This derives from the willingness of General de Gaulle and other past legislators in the aftermath of the Liberation of France in 1945 to ensure territorial and social equality amongst students throughout France.

Nevertheless, according to a 2010 research, top-notch students following the competitive written examination organized by the six IEPs of Aix, Lille, Lyon, Rennes, Toulouse, Strasbourg, tend to choose Lyon, along with Lille and Strasbourg as their first choices. Accordingly, approximately 55% of the students at Sciences Po hold a French Baccalaureate (equivalent to an A level), predominantly scientific or economic, with a Summa Cum Laude distinction. This percentage is higher than in Bordeaux and Grenoble Institutes of Political Studies. Such a percentage is also higher than in most of the best French Grandes Ecoles.

The current acceptance/selection rate for students willing to enter in the first year of the standard curriculum for the IEP of Lyon, Aix, Lille, Rennes, Toulouse, Strasbourg, is now less than 10% while it reached 18.7% in 2010 and 14.17% in 2013 for the IEP of Paris (additionally, the rate of the so-called international procedure for foreign students or French students with a foreign degree was up to 31% in 2012). That makes the selection process for these six IEPs more competitive than for Paris. The acceptance/selection rate for students willing to enter in the second year of the curriculum of the IEP in Lyon is less than 5% (853 candidates for 42 places available for the 2013–14 academic year).

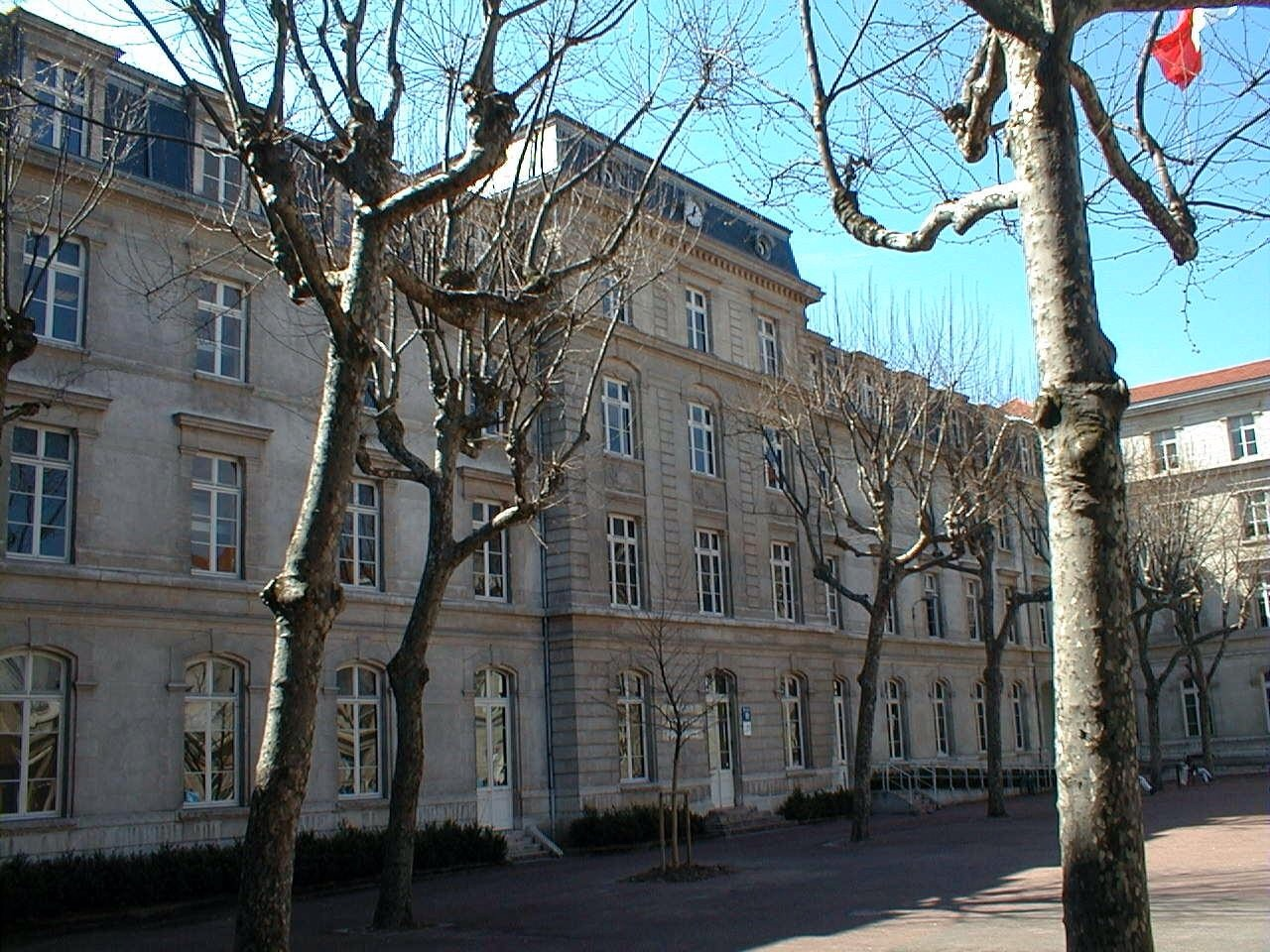
In the middle, the administrative building. On the right wing, the entrance to the Leclair Lecture Hall.

=== Accolades ===
"The IEP in Lyon is one of the most respected institutes in France and both its programmes and international connections are extensive and world renowned" the King's College of London has stressed while Brown University has praised Sciences Po Lyon for its Middle Eastern and North African studies.

Sciences Po Lyon's dynamism and international reputation was underscored by the French newspaper, Challenges, in its ranking of French Business Schools.

== Curriculum, external evaluation and international partners ==
=== Curriculum ===
Sciences Po Lyon currently offers a 5-year-long programme, with a three-year-long undergraduate programme and a two-year graduate programme in line with the Bologna Process and delivers its main diploma equivalent to a master's degree. The first two years are aimed at giving students a multidisciplinary background, primarily focusing on social sciences such as economics, public law, contemporary history, philosophy, sociology and public policy. Additionally, students need to study at least two foreign languages, such as English, German, Spanish, Chinese, Japanese, Arabic, Italian, or Russian.

The last two years provide students with further specialization in a wide range of specialities:

- Asian affairs
- Communication, Culture and Institutions
- European affairs
- Latin America affairs
- Maghreb, Near and Middle-East affairs
- Engineering of public/private partnerships
- Globalization and governance
- International cultural exchange
- Print and broadcast media
- Public management
- Public service
- Territorial administration

=== International partnerships ===
During their third year at Sciences Po, students can decide either to do a year-long internship or to pursue their studies abroad, at one of 166 partner universities. Amongst these universities are:

==== In Africa ====
The University of the Witwatersrand in South Africa;

==== In Asia ====
The East China Normal University, Fudan University, the University of Hong Kong, Shanghai International Studies University and Shanghai Jiao Tong University in China; the Jawaharlal Nehru University and the University of Madras in India; the University of Tokyo, Tohoku University and the University of Waseda in Japan; Hankuk University of Foreign Studies in South Korea;

==== In Central and South-America ====
The University of Buenos Aires in Argentina; the University of São Paulo in Brazil; the University of Chile in Chile; Our Lady of the Rosary University in Colombia;

==== In Europe ====
The University of Vienna in Austria; the Université Catholique de Louvain and the Université libre de Bruxelles in Belgium; Charles University in Prague in the Czech Republic; Aarhus University and the University of Copenhagen in Denmark; the Free University of Berlin, Goethe University Frankfurt, the University of Konstanz, the University of Leipzig, the University of Münster and the University of Mannheim in Germany; the National and Kapodistrian University of Athens in Greece; the University of Bologna, the University of Florence and La Sapienza University in Italy; the University of Latvia in Latvia; the University of Amsterdam in the Netherlands; the University of Oslo in Norway; Higher School of Economics and Moscow State University in Russia; the University of Barcelona, the University of Salamanca and Universidad Complutense de Madrid in Spain; University of Gothenburg in Sweden; the University of Bern and the University of Zurich in Switzerland;

King's College London, the Imperial College London, the School of Oriental and African Studies (SOAS) of the University of London, the University of Aberdeen, the University of Birmingham, the University of Bristol, the University of Edinburgh and the University of Warwick in the United Kingdom;

==== In the Middle-East region ====
Institut français du Proche-Orient in Jordan; Université Saint-Joseph in Lebanon; Galatasaray University in Turkey;

==== In North-America ====
Bowdoin College, Brown University, the University of California (including the University of California, Berkeley, the University of California, Los Angeles and the University of California, San Diego), Georgetown University, the University of Pennsylvania (including the Wharton School), and the University of Virginia in the United States; in Mexico, the Instituto Tecnológico Autónomo de México, as well as the El Colegio de México and Universidad Iberoamericana.

The École nationale d'administration publique, the University of British Columbia, McGill University, the Université de Montréal (including HEC Montreal), the University of Ottawa and the University of Toronto in Canada;

==== In Oceania ====
The University of Queensland, the University of Melbourne, the University of Sydney in Australia.

Each year, approximately 200 students from Sciences Po have the opportunity to study abroad during the third year of the academic curriculum. Reciprocally 250 foreign students come to study to the IEP in Lyon.

=== Dual Master's degrees and special network of universities and colleges ===
==== Dual Master's degrees with French colleges and universities ====
Sciences Po Lyon offers dual master's degrees with institutions such as the École nationale des travaux publics de l'État (ENTPE), EMLYON Business School, the École Normale Supérieure de Lyon, the CFJ Paris-based Journalism School and Training center, Jean Moulin University Lyon 3.

==== Dual Master's degrees with foreign universities ====
The institute has established partnerships with Hong Kong Baptist University (香港浸會大學) and Loughborough University.

The institute is also working on the establishment of a dual master's degree with the University of Virginia.

==== CHELS (College des Hautes Etudes / Lyon Science[s] - The Lyon Collegium for Advanced Studies) ====
Since the 2013–14 academic year, Sciences Po along with Ecole Centrale de Lyon (the Lyon engineering school), VetAgro (the Lyon veterinarian school), ENS Lyon, the Conservatory of Lyon (Conservatoire national supérieur de musique et de danse de Lyon) has established a Collegium for Advanced Studies, which would result in greater synergies in terms of curriculum, in the delivery of dual degrees and in multualizing their international partnerships.

==== European Master of Public Administration Consortium ====
Sciences Po Lyon and Sciences Po Paris are both part of the European Master of Public Administration Consortium. This consortium was established in 1990-1991 and has developed a multilateral exchange programs for students and scholars of public administration.

The other European members of this consortium are: Université catholique de Louvain, Tallinn University of Technology, University of Vaasa, German University of Administrative Sciences Speyer, Corvinus University of Budapest, University of Limerick, Leiden University, Erasmus University Rotterdam, University of Geneva, University of Liverpool.

Members of this consortium deliver a joint diploma upon completion of the program.

==== Sciences Po Europe / the European School of Public Affairs ====
Sciences Po Lyon along with the other IEPs in Aix, Lille, Rennes, Strasbourg, Toulouse, formed an alliance on 28 June 2013 by establishing Sciences Po Europe / The European School of Public Affairs (ESoPA). The purpose of this alliance is to enhance their international visibility and their current partnerships with other universities. As such, ESoPA has partnered with Paris Dauphine University

=== External evaluation by French public agencies ===
In its report in December 2010, AERES, the French Evaluation Agency on Research and Higher Education, praised the excellency of the academic training offered by Sciences Po Lyon. It acknowledged as well the top level international network built by the Institute and underscored that its students are proud of their education.

Sciences Po Lyon's research center on Asian Affairs has been graded A+ by AERES, its center GREMMO ("Groupe de recherches et d'études sur la Méditerranée et le Moyen-Orient") on the Middle East an A. The GREMMO is a joint research center along with the CNRS, Lumière University Lyon 2 and the Maison de l'Orient et de la Méditerranée.

Overall, Sciences Po Lyon research capacities have received an A, the same grade obtained by the doctoral school of Sciences Po Paris.

This past evaluation was subsequently confirmed in 2015 by HCERES, the French High Council for Evaluation of Research and Higher Education. HCERES has also praised the excellent network of Sciences Po Lyon's international partners, notably those in the United States. The institute has indeed benefited strongly from being part of the Fulbright Program. This has provided the exchange of professors and lecturers from top-ranked US universities, such as Andrew C. Rudalevige, PhD from Harvard University and Toppan Prize of the best dissertation in political science.

== Social life ==
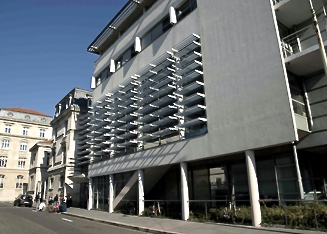
The Pedagogical Building

Sciences Po Lyon has fifteen student associations, including the "Association des Anciens Eleves de l'IEP de Lyon" (Alumni association), "Bobinophile" (for movie fans), "Comequi" (aimed at promoting fair trade),"Déclics"(photography), "La Fanfaraon" (Brass band), "Melting Sciences Pot" (aimed at welcoming foreign students) and Sciences Po TV. Several student papers have been created such as La Mâche (philosophy and poetry), "Po Go" (music and night life), "Regards d'Ailleurs" (political news and analyses) or L'Ecornifleur (political news), the latter partnering with national print media such as L'Express. Cultural groups such as "Arriba Do Sul" organize events that highlight foreign cultures or cuisine.

The Bureau des Etudiants (BDE or Student Council), aims to integrate students into school life through cultural events, conferences with political leaders, diplomats and opinion leaders. Major events include the "WEST" (a weekend of ski), the "week-end d'intégration" (where new students integrate with collective games and parties), and the "Gala de Sciences Po Lyon" (which gathers students and professors for a night of shows and dance).

Sciences Po Lyon students participate in the "Crit", a sporting event between all the Institutes of Political Studies in France. The university has sport clubs, such as its Soccer, Basketball, Handball, or the Rugby Team (the GPRC). The "Bureau des sports" (BDE) manages the school's athletic life and organizes the "Crit", in cooperation with the BDEs of the other IEPs.

== Research and policy ==
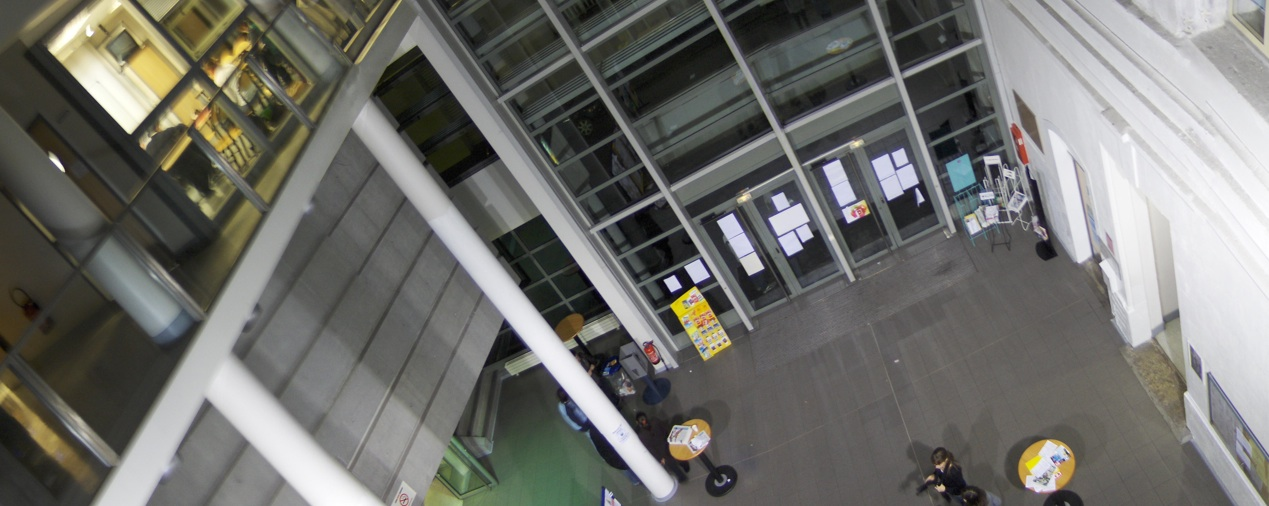
The Atrium, the great hall of the pedagogical building

=== Public information and communication (ELICO) ===
The Information and Communication Research Team of Lyon (ELICO) brings together thirty teacher-researchers and around forty PhD students in information and communication sciences from Sciences Po Lyon, Lyon-1, Lyon-2 and Lyon-3 universities as well as from the National School of Information Sciences and Libraries (ENSSIB).

=== Institute of Human Sciences (ISH) ===
Established in 1987, the Institute of Human Sciences (ISH) brings together 23 research laboratories located in Lyon and Saint-Étienne. It covers the fields of human and social sciences, including history, economics-management, sociology, linguistics and political science.

=== Political science (CERIEP and TRIANGLE) ===
Along with Université Lumière-Lyon 2, the institute hosts the "Centre de Politologie de Lyon ("CERIEP"), a CNRS research department on politology. In addition to its master programmes, Sciences Po offers a PhD programme in political sciences and participates in research and study programs with the support of national partner institutions such as the Rhône-Alpes Regional Council, one of the richest in France. More recently, Sciences Po has established a research group named Triangle, in joint cooperation with the Centre national de la recherche scientifique (French National Centre for Scientific Research), the École Normale Supérieure de Lyon (ENS) and Lyon Lumiere University.

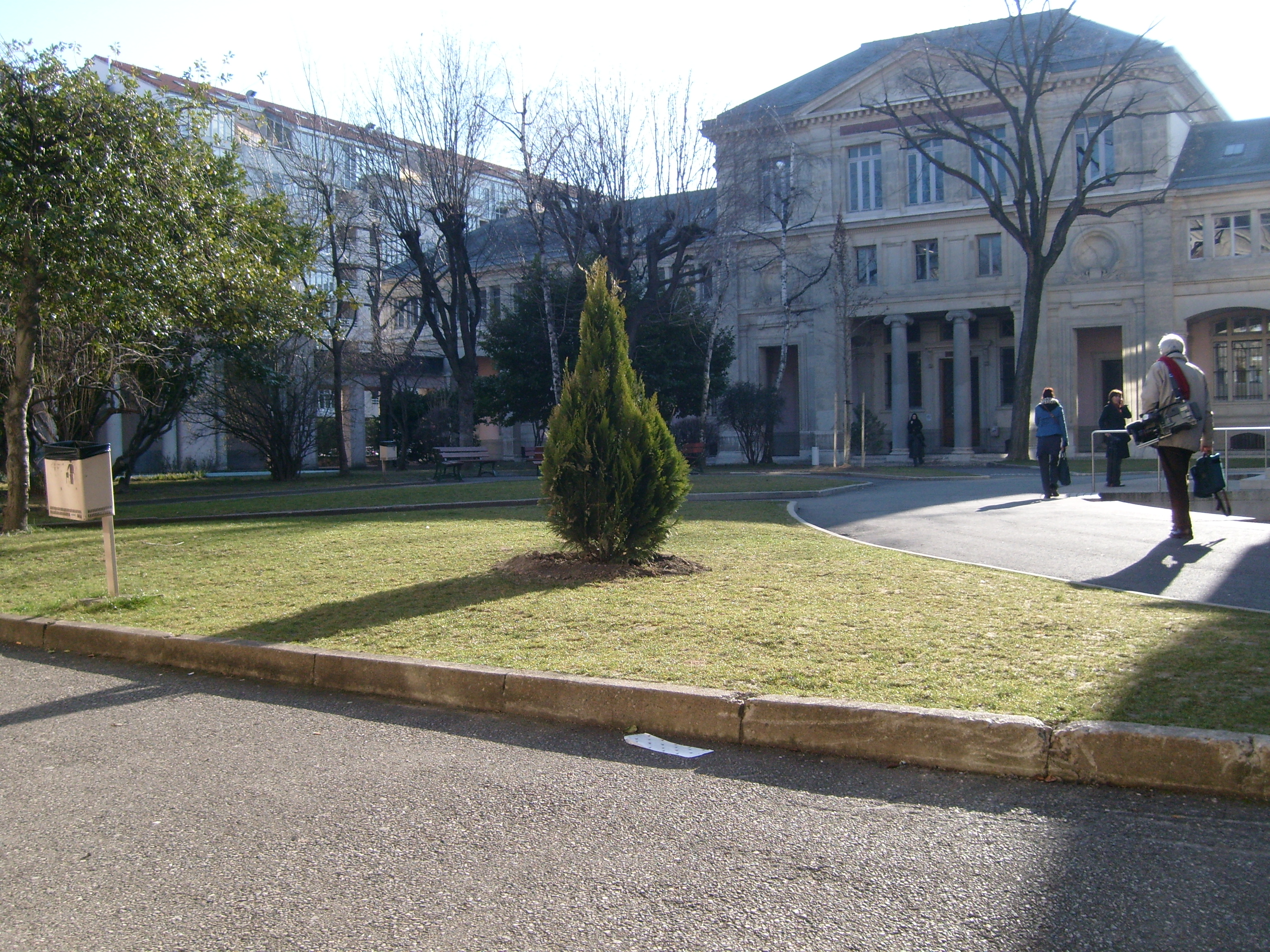
Lumière University Lyon 2

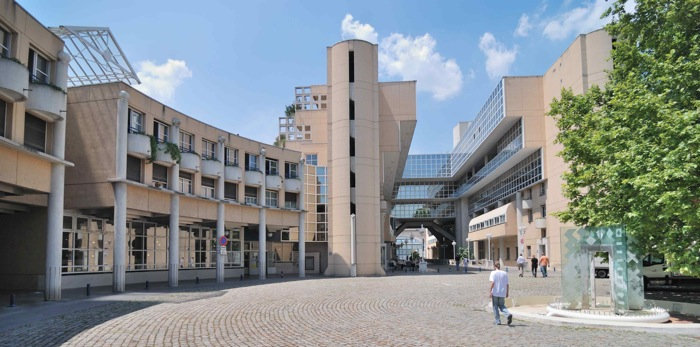
École normale supérieure de Lyon

=== Asian affairs (IAO) ===
Along with the ENS in Lyon and the Université Lumière-Lyon 2, Sciences Po is running the Lyon Institute of East Asian Studies ("Institut d'Asie Orientale"/ IAO), which has been graded A+ by AERES and has been considered as such as the best French research institute in this field. Since 2009, the IAO has been partnering with the Tohoku University within the framework of the Global Center of Excellence project as well as with the University of Beijing and the University of Tokyo for other projects. The IAO is involved in the training of PhD students under an agreement with the École normale supérieure Paris-Saclay and the Ecole Normale Supérieure de Ulm and the East China Normal University of Shanghai. IAO members also sit on dissertation committees at Stanford University and the University of California, Berkeley.

=== Middle East (GREMMO) ===
Along with the Maison de l'Orient et de la Méditerranée, the institute has established a research center on Middle Eastern Affairs, called "GREMMO" (Groupe de recherche et d’études sur la Méditerranée et le Moyen-Orient). It is supervised by Fabrice Balanche, an expert on Syria.

=== Publications ===
In order to gain greater visibility overseas, its publications are now labelled under the publications of the University of Lyon. The latter is grouping the main universities and colleges in Lyon.

== Notable alumni ==
It has had a low number of alumni (8,500 since its establishment).

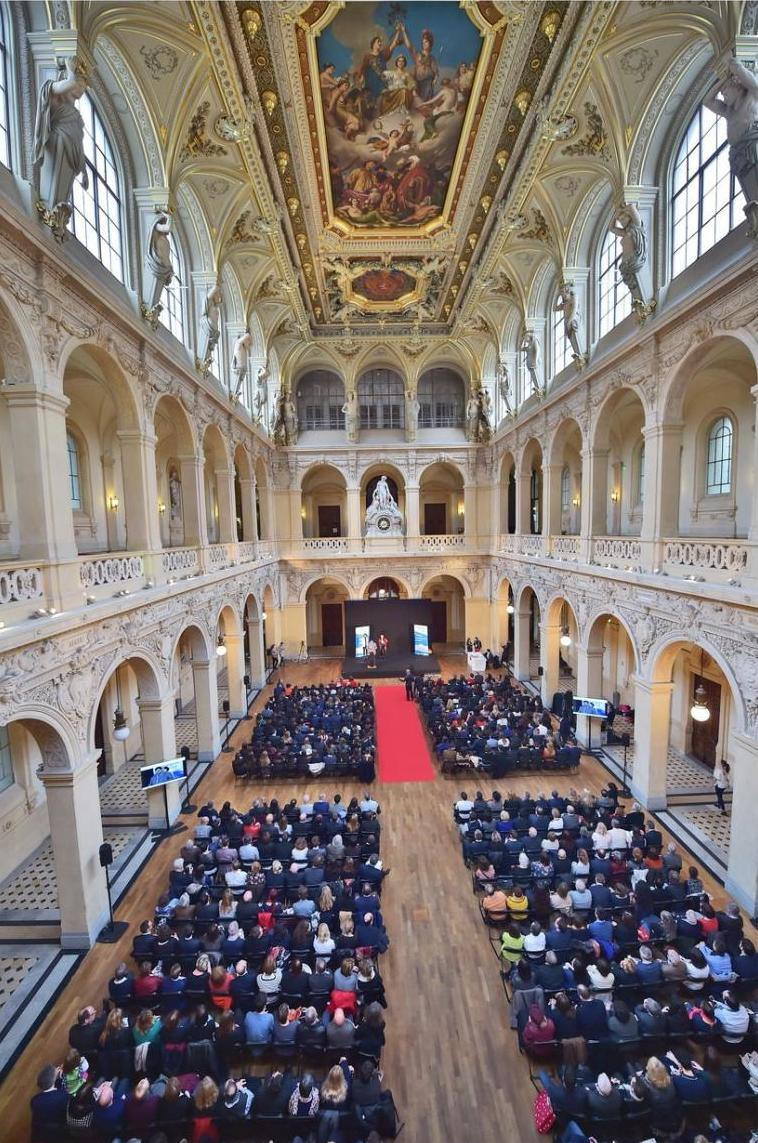
Graduation ceremony at the Palais de la Bourse in Lyon - 17 March 2018

=== Political leaders ===
- Gilbert Baumet. Member of the French Parliament. Former minister of Craftmanship and Trade under Beregovoy's government (1992–93)
- Jean-Patrick Courtois. Member of the French Parliament. Mayor of the City of Mâcon.
- Mathieu Darnaud, senator The Republicans (France) (LR). LR National Secretary for the young militants
- Bernard Deladriere. French diplomat. Political leader in the French New Caledonia.
- Jean-Claude Flory. Member of the French Parliament. Mayor of Vals-les-Bains.
- Jean-Louis Gagnaire. Member of the French Parliament.
- Bernadette Groison. Syndicalist. Secretary General of the French FSU Fédération syndicale unitaire, the largest trade union in the French public sector.
- Michel Havard. Member of the French Parliament. Leader of the political opposition in Lyon.
- Régis Juanico. Member of the French Parliament.
- Gerard Lindeperg. Political writer. Former number 2 of the Socialist Party.
- Michel Mercier. Minister of Justice. Former Minister of Territorial Administration. Member of the French Senate. President of the Rhône department. No 2 of the Democratic Movement (France) or MoDem.
- Jean-Loup Metton. Member of the French Parliament.
- Jacques Myard. Member of the French Parliament. Mayor of the city of Maisons-Laffitte.
- Franck Pupunat. Co-founder of the Utopia political movement.
- Jean-Jack Queyranne. President of the Rhône-Alpes region of France (since 2004) and French Minister for Relations with Parliament (2000–02).

=== Public institutions ===
- Laurent Bayle, President of Philharmonie de Paris, executive director of the Cité de la musique
- Christian Galliard de Lavernée. Prefect of Pays de la Loire, prefect of Loire-Atlantique, in Nantes.
- Didier Migaud. Chief Baron (president) of the Court of Audit (France). Member of the French Parliament. Former president of the Finance Commission of the French National Assembly.
- Jacques Toubon. French rights defender and ombudsman (since July 2014). Member of the European Parliament (2004–14); French Minister of Culture (1993–95); French Minister of Justice (1995–97).

=== Business ===
- Paul Alezraa. CEO Avesta Group, international consultancy firm dedicated to the culture and leisure industries.
- Bernard Gaud. Chairman of Mouvement des entreprises de France Rhône-Alpes and Union économique et sociale pour le logement (UESL)-Action Logement. CEO of the French-Indian Shining Management Institute. Former CEO of Yoplait
- Christophe de Fitte. CEO Sandvik Hard Materials France.
- Daniel Lebegue. Independent Director of Alcatel-Lucent and of Credit Agricole SA, Chairman of the Institut Francais des Administrateurs, Chairman of Transparency International France and of Sciences Po Lyon. Former treasury director (1984–1987), vice-chairman, advisor to the president of BNP Paribas (1996–1997), former CEO of BNP Paribas, former CEO of Caisse des dépôts et consignations (1997–2002).
- Damien Lefebvre. Executive co-chairman of the W.ILLI.AM Agency in Montreal, the most important digital agency in Canada.
- Henri Moulard. Prominent figure of the European financial establishment and pioneer of the French private equity industry. Former CEO of Banque Neuflize Schlumberger Mallet Demachy, ABN AMRO France and Generali France. Chairman of the audit committees of Crédit Agricole (2000–2009) and Calyon (2009–2010). Member of the advisory committee of Elf Aquitaine (2000–2010). Member of Blackfin Capital Partners' executive committee. Co-founder and President of Truffle Capital.
- Jerome Saddier. CEO of the Mutuelle Nationale Territoriale. Former Chief of Staff of the Junior Minister for Social Economy and Solidarity, Benoît Hamon.
- Pierre Simon. Chairman of the Paris Chamber of Commerce (until 2010). Chairman of Eurochambres, the association of the European chambers of commerce. Chairman of the Greater Paris Investment Agency, Paris Aravis Conseil and Magellan Consulting. Member of the executive committee of the Caisse des dépôts et consignations.
- Jean-Paul Vulliermet. CEO of PEEK-A-BOO group.

=== Foreign affairs ===
- Sophie Aubert. French ambassador to Bangladesh.
- Élisabeth Beton Delègue. French ambassador to Mexico. Former assistant secretary for the Americas and the Caribbean at the French Ministry of Foreign Affairs. Former ambassador to Chile.
- Alcide Djédjé. Minister of Foreign Affairs of Ivory Coast and former Ambassador to the United Nations.
- Jean Yves Ekalle Diboty. Founder. International Relations and Affairs Group.
- Didier Le Bret. Director of the crisis cell of the French Ministry of Foreign Affairs. Former French ambassador to Haiti.
- Serge Tomasi. French permanent representative (ambassador) to Food and Agriculture Organization. Former director for development at the French Ministry of Foreign and European Affairs. Former deputy director at the Organisation for Economic Co-operation and Development.

=== Media and entertainment industries ===
- Thomas Baumgartner. Producer of "L'atelier du son" at France Culture.
- Valérie Béranger. Political journalist and TV presenter at BFM TV.
- Liseron Boudoul. Senior TV journalist at TF1.
- Sonia Chironi. Political journalist and TV presenter.
- Eric Decouty. Political journalist. Deputy Chief Editor of Libération. Former Deputy Chief Editor of Le Parisien.
- Cécile Delarue. TV presenter.
- Patrick Fiole. Journalist. Former Chief Editor of Le Nouvel Observateur
- Joséphine Japy. Actress (France Gall in Cloclo; lead role in Mélanie Laurent's Respire (film))
- Jacques Maillot. Writer and movie director.

=== Academics ===
- Noémie Bouhana. PhD in criminology at the University of Cambridge. Lecturer in Crime Science, Jill Dando Institute of Crime Science at the University College London.
- Thierry Kirat. Research director at Paris-Dauphine University.
- Fabrice Larat. Director of the Research Institute on Administrative Science at the French École nationale d'administration. Chief editor of the Revue Française d'Administration Publique.
- Alix Meyer. Lecturer in International Relations at Sciences Po Lyon. Specialist in US politics. Former Fulbright Scholar at Princeton University.
- Bruno Perreau. Cynthia L. Reed Professor of French Studies at the Massachusetts Institute of Technology. He is also Non-Resident Faculty at the Center for European Studies, Harvard.
- Frederic Ramel. Professor in Political Science at Sciences Po in Paris.
- Zekeria Ould Ahmed Salem. Professor in Political Sciences at Sciences Po in Paris.
- Pierre-Henri Tavoillot. Professor in Philosophy. Paris Sorbonne University.
- Michel Vate. Professor Emeritus in Economics. University of Lyon.
- Yves Crozet. Professor Emeritus in Economics. University of Lyon.

=== Other ===
- Julien Desprès. Rower. Bronze Medal (coxless four) during the 2008 Beijing Olympic Games. Gold Medal during the 2010 World Championships (same category).
- Claude Mollard. Writer. Photographer. Founder of the Centre national de la photographie. Former General Secretary of the Centre Pompidou. Senior Member of the French Court of Audit.
- Michel Seurat. Sociologist. Abducted in 1985 by the Lebanese Islamist Jihad. Reportedly died during his custody.

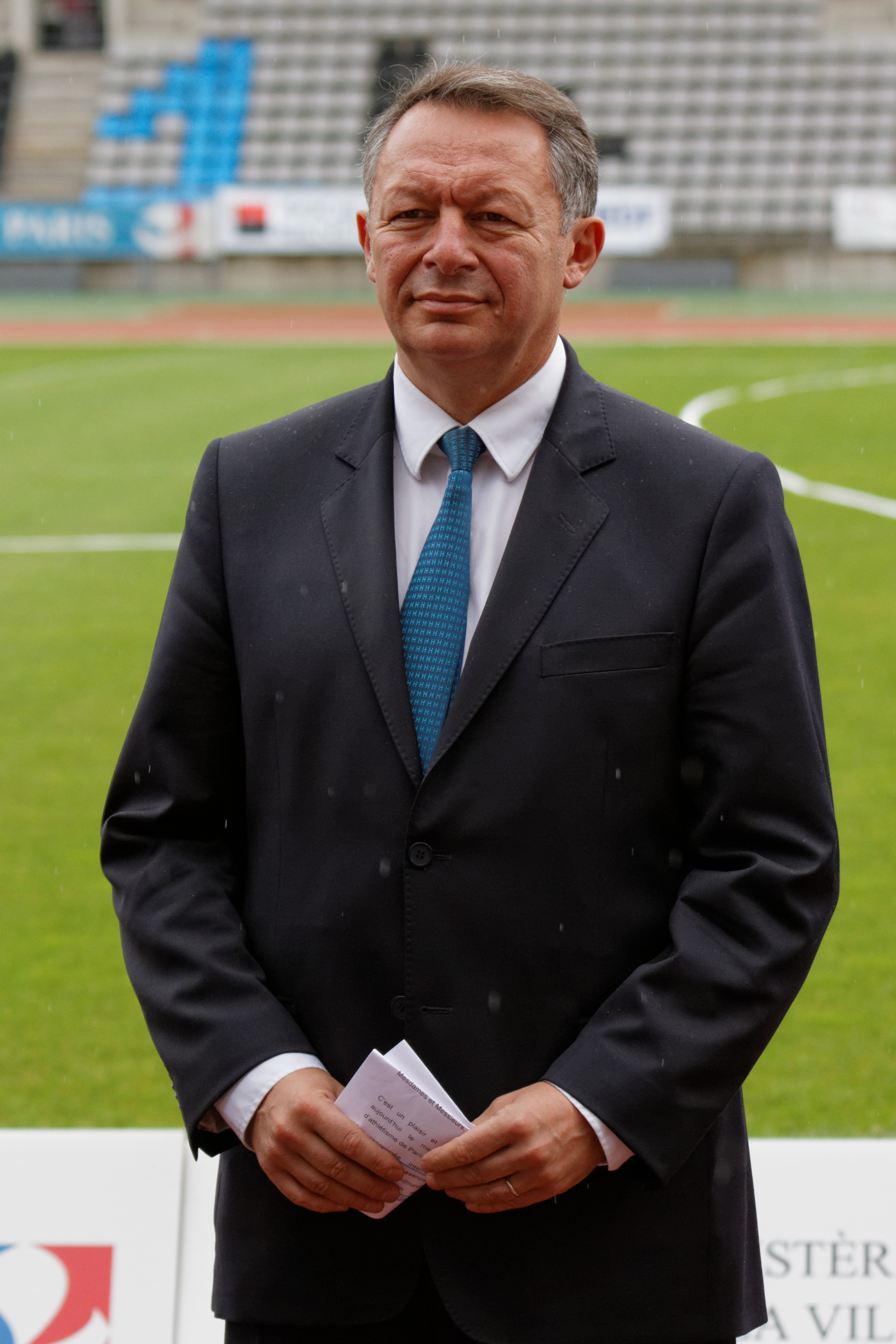
Thierry Braillard, Junior Minister (Youth and Sports)

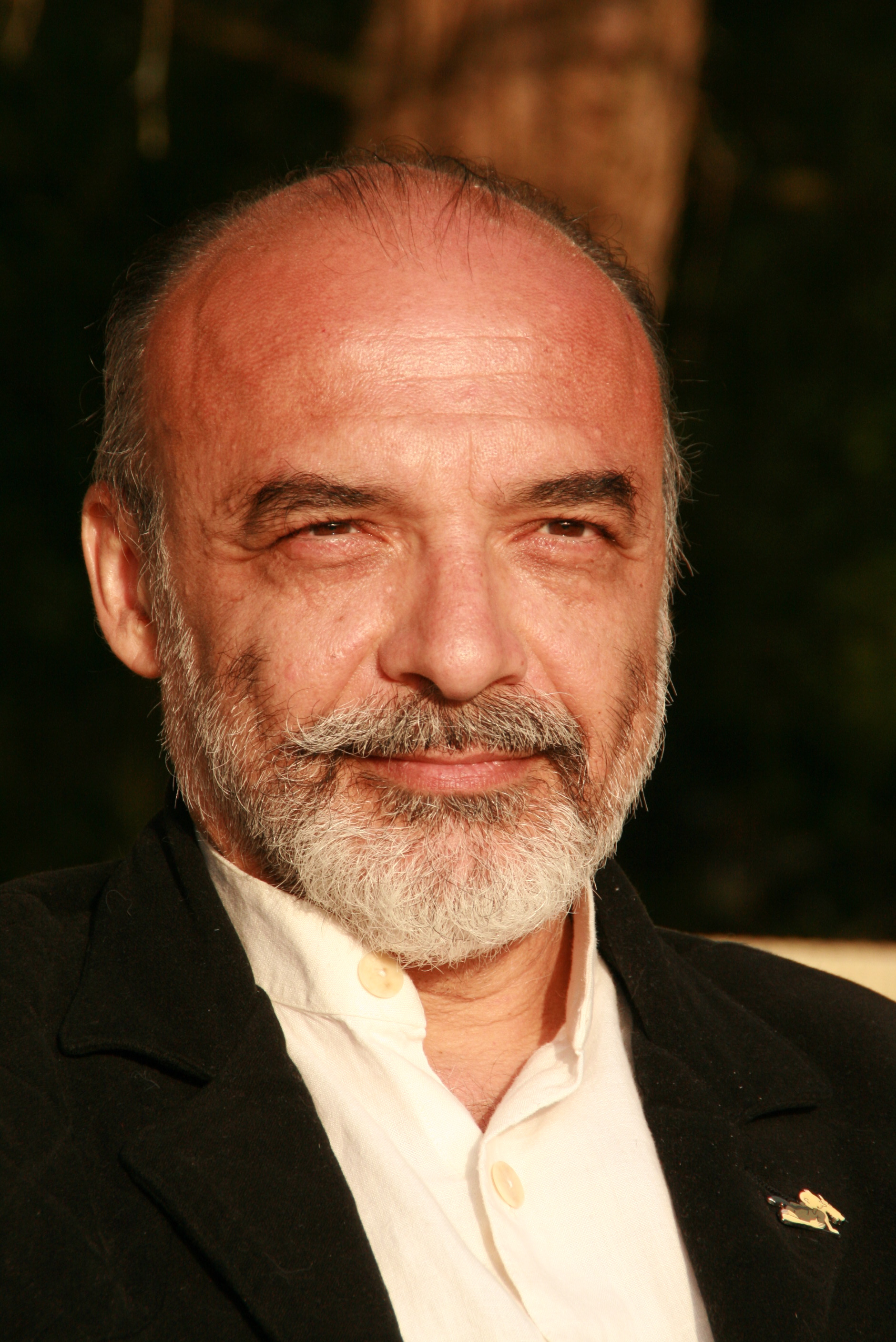
Édouard Brasey, writer

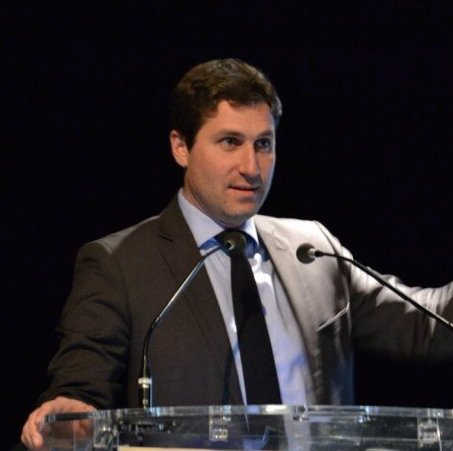
Mathieu Darnaud, senator The Republicans (France)

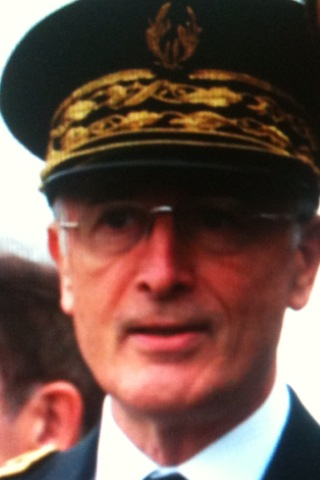
Christian Galliard de Lavernée. Prefect.

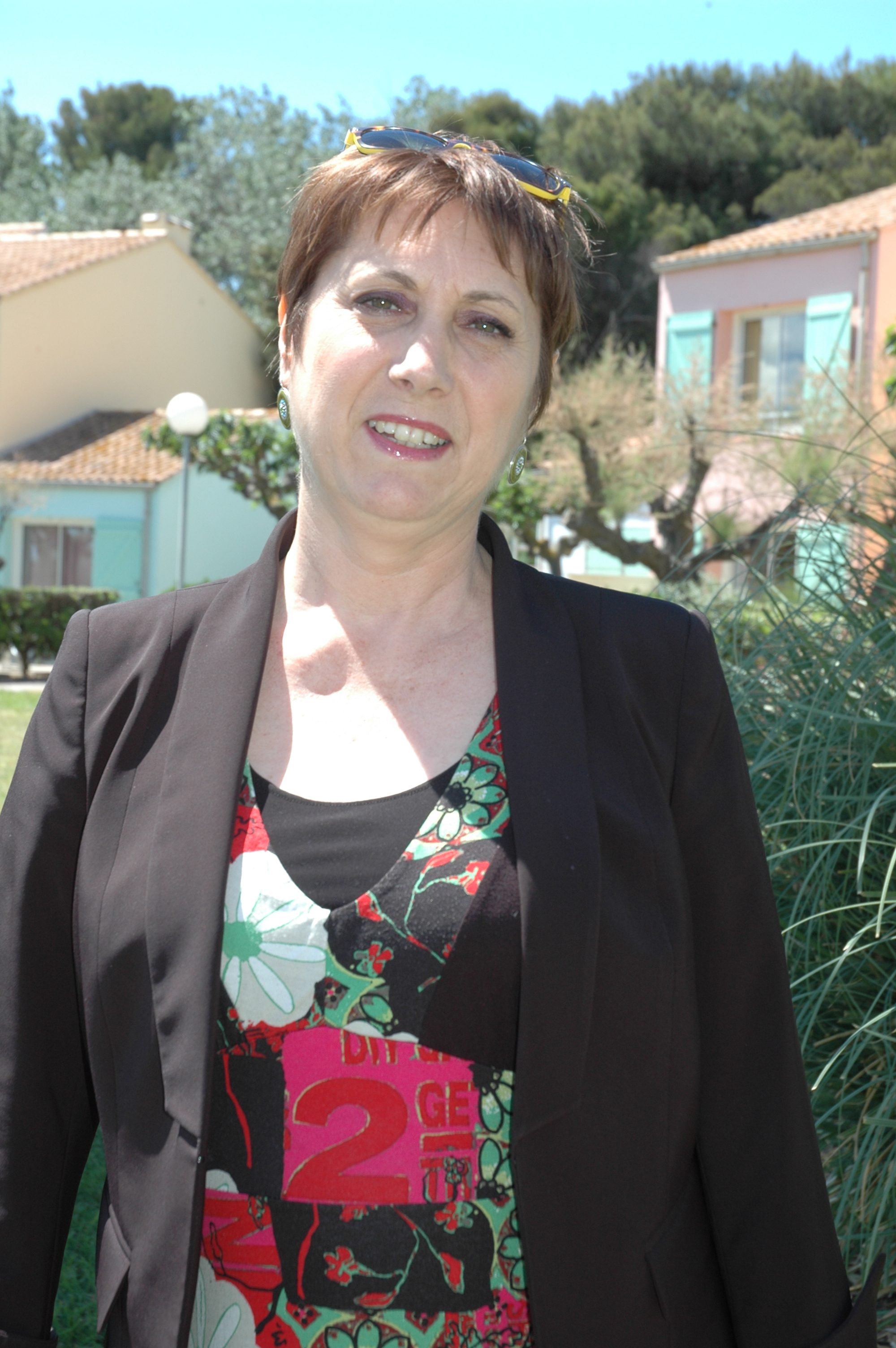
Bernadette Groison, Secretary General of the French FSU Fédération syndicale unitaire

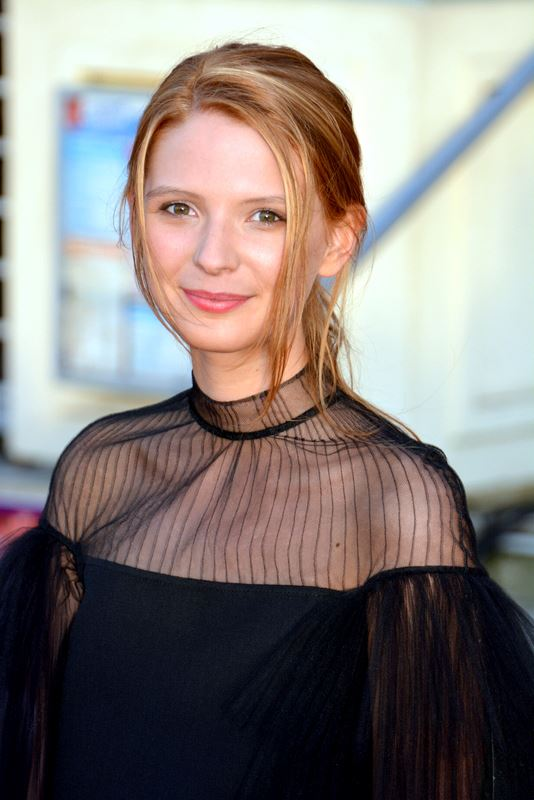
Joséphine Japy, actress

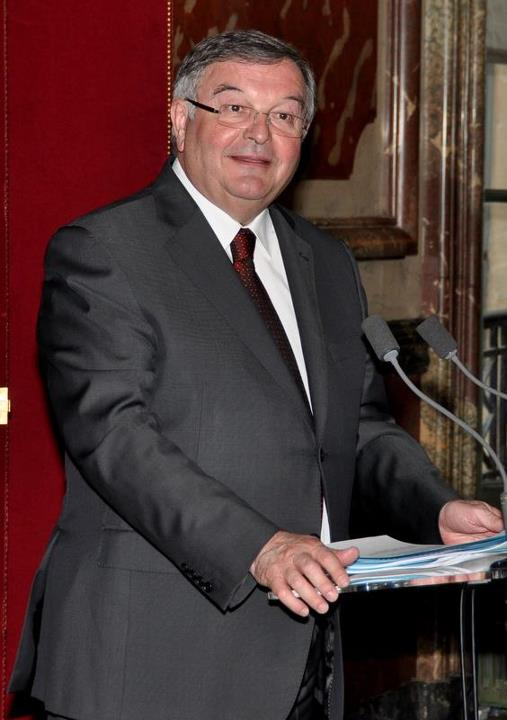
Michel Mercier, former Minister (Justice, Territorial Administration)

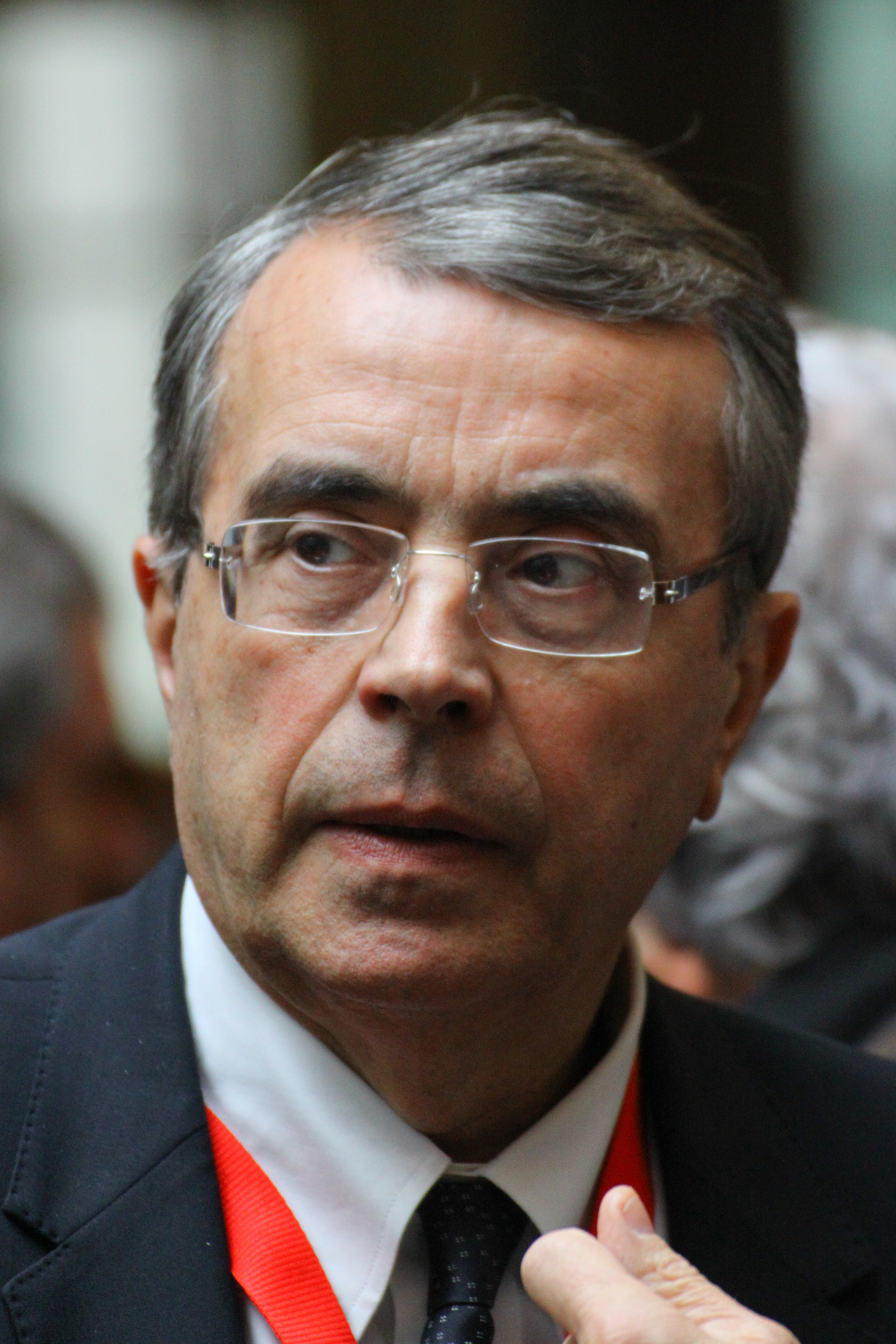
Jean-Jack Queyranne, former Minister (Overseas, Interior, Relations with the Parliament). Current president of the Rhone-Alpes region.

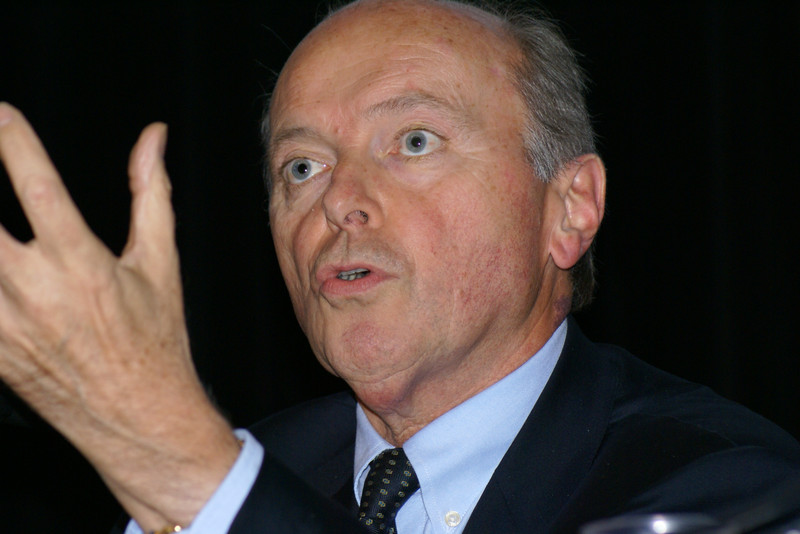
Jacques Toubon, former Minister (Culture, Justice). French Rights Defender.

== Notable faculty ==
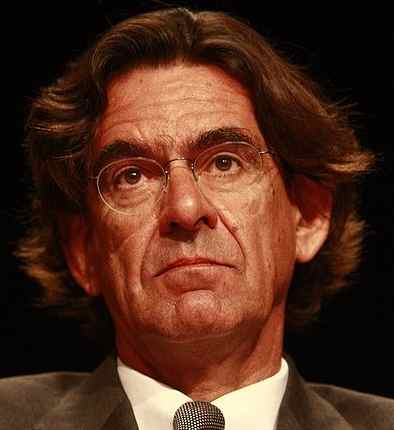
Luc Ferry. Philosopher. Former Minister (Education)

- Gilbert Blardone. Economist.
- Michel Boivin. French historian and anthropologist who specializes in the Muslim world.
- Marie-Anne Cohendet. Constitutionalist
- Dominique Chagnollaud. Political scientist.
- Philippe Corcuff. Political scientist, member of the Association for the Taxation of Financial Transactions and for Citizens' Action.
- Wu Chih-chung. Professor of political science.
- Luc Ferry, philosopher, French Minister of Education (2002–04), former advisor to President Sarkozy.
- Michel Foucher. Geographer and Historian. Former French ambassador to Latvia, former adviser to former Foreign Minister Hubert Védrine, former director of the French Foreign Ministry's Policy Planning Staff (France).
- Pascal Marchand. Expert on former Soviet Union and Russia.
- Vincent Michelot. Professor in international relations, expert on US history and foreign policy.
- Andrew C. Rudalevige, PhD from Harvard University (awarded Toppan Prize as Harvard's best thesis/dissertation in political science), professor of political science at Bowdoin College.
