= Yves Crozet =

French economist

Academic background
- Education: Lumière University Lyon 2

Academic work
- Discipline: Transport economics
- Institutions: Institut d'études politiques de Lyon; Lumière University Lyon 2

Yves Crozet is a French economist and specialist in transport economics.

== Biography ==
Crozet is a professor in the Institut d'études politiques de Lyon (Sciences Po Lyon) and Lumière University Lyon 2. He was the president of the Laboratory of Transport Economics (LET) from 1997 to 2007, and the administrator of Réseau Ferré de France.

== Distinctions ==
On 18 April 2014, upon recommendation by the Ministry of Ecology, Crozet was awarded a Knighthood of France's Legion of Honour.

== Selected publications ==
- Analyse économique de l'État, Armand Colin, 1997
- Le territoire aménagé par les réseaux. Énergie, transports et télécommunications with Pierre Musso et Guy Joignaux, Éditions de l'Aube, 2002
- Réseaux, services et territoires – horizon 2020, with Pierre Musso, Éditions de l'Aube, 2003
- Les Grandes Questions de l'économie internationale, with René Sandretto, Lahsen Abdelmalki et Daniel Dufourt, Armand Colin, 2005
- Les Grandes Questions de la société française, with Dominique Bolliet et Jean Fleury, Armand Colin, 2005
- Le calcul économique : Dans le processus de choix collectif des investissements de transport with Joël Maurice, Economica, 2007
- Histoire des faits économiques contemporains, with Maurice Niveau, Presses Universitaires de France, 2010
- Hyper-mobilité et politiques publiques. Changer d'époque?, Economica, 2016
