= Ann Marie Kimball =

American physician

- Education: Stanford University; University of Washington School of Medicine
- Occupations: Epidemiologist, physician,
- Awards: Fellow, American College of Preventive Medicine; Fulbright New Century Scholar Award; Guggenheim Scholar award In Resident scholar, Bellagio Center (Rockefeller); HHS Secretary Outstanding Team Award, Department of Health, Washington State
- Scientific career
- Workplaces: University of Washington; Chatham House Royal Institute of Foreign Affairs

Ann Marie Kimball is an American physician. She is known for being the pioneer of electronic disease surveillance for infectious disease outbreaks and pandemics. She is currently a Professor Emerita in the Department of Epidemiology at the University of Washington, a Consulting Fellow at the Chatham House Royal Institute of Foreign Affairs, and was a Strategic Consultant in Global Health at the Rockefeller Foundation. Kimball served as a technical and strategic lead for the Bill and Melinda Gates Foundation infectious disease surveillance strategy formation.

Kimball's research on global trade and emerging infections has earned her a Fulbright New Century Scholars award and a Guggenheim Scholars award. She is the author of two books: Risky Trade: Infectious Diseases in an Era of Global Trade and Risks and Challenges in Medical Tourism. She has also done extensive media work with television, radio and the press. Kimball brought important innovations to international infectious disease surveillance through the founding of the APEC Emerging Infections network advanced electronic disease surveillance and networking in the Asia Pacific.

Kimball is a Fellow of the American College of Preventive Medicine.

== Education ==
Kimball obtained a bachelor's degree from Stanford University with honors in Humanities and Biology in 1972. She then enrolled at the University of Washington School of Medicine and earned a Doctor of Medicine degree with thesis honors in 1976, and a Master of Public Health degree in 1981. Kimball did Internship and Residency training in Internal Medicine at the University of Washington and completed a Preventive Medicine residency at the Centers for Disease Control, Atlanta and the University of Washington, Seattle.

== Career ==
Following her Internal Medicine Internship at the University of Washington, Kimball started her career as an EIS officer at the Centers for Disease Control while concurrently serving as an instructor in the Department of Medicine at Emory University in 1977, where she served in that position until 1979. She was key in the investigation of infant cholera in Bahrain, the results of which contributed to the ban on infant formula marketing to developing countries. She served as an Emergency Room Physician at Northgate General Hospital, Seattle from 1979 to 1981. As an Attending Physician, she held appointments at the Harborview Medical Center Madison Clinic for HIV from 1991 to 1996, at Harborview Medical Center International Clinic from 1997 to 2002, and at the Harborview Medical Center Sexually Transmitted Disease Clinic from 2002 to 2011. From 1991 to 2011, she was associated with Harborview Medical Center Medical Staff, and also served as Volunteer Physician at Walker-Whitman Clinic for a year.

While at the Centers for Disease Control, She held a brief appointment as a lecturer at American University of Beirut, Lebanon. Recruited as deputy director for the Strengthening Health Delivery Systems in West and Central Africa program based in Abidjan, Côte d'Ivoire. She joined Boston University School of Public Health as a Clinical Assistant Professor in 1981. From 1983 to 1985, Kimball served as Research Advisor to the MCH Division of the Ministry of Health, Sanaa, Yemen and Oil Rig physician for Yemen Hunt Oil and Air France while residing in Sanaa. Kimball was then recruited to serve as Regional Advisor for Columbia University's USAID-funded program in Operations Research in Family Planning based in Dakar, Senegal. From 1985 to 1990, she was appointed as an Assistant Professor of Clinical Public Health at Columbia University. In 1988 she returned to the US as Regional Advisor for HIV/AIDS and head of National Program Support with the Pan American Health Organization based in Washington, D.C. Returning to Washington State in 1991 as Director of the Division of HIV/AIDS with the Department of Health of Washington State, she joined the University of Washington as a Clinical Assistant Professor of Medicine and Epidemiology. Concurrently she was elected as Chair of the nascent National Alliance of State and Territorial AIDS Directors (NASTAD). She joined UW faculty full time and became Associate Professor of Health Services & Epidemiology as well as an adjunct professor in Medicine in 1993, an adjunct professor in Medicine and Biomedical and Health Informatics in 2001, and an adjunct faculty member in International Studies at Jackson School of International Studies in 2009. Promoted to Professor of Epidemiology and Health Services in 2001, she retired in 2011, becoming Professor Emerita in the Department of Epidemiology at the University of Washington.

In 2012, Kimball was recruited as Senior Program Officer to the Bill and Melinda Gates Foundation for Epidemiology and Surveillance with the Global Health program. Retiring in 2015 she joined Chatham House as an associate fellow, leading a Rockefeller-funded initiative to strengthen post-ebola surveillance in West Africa. She was promoted to Senior Consulting Fellow in 2017.

A Rotarian for 25 years, Kimball serves as vice-chair of the Rotary International COVID-19 Task Force. This group guides Rotary's response to the pandemic.

== Works ==
During the early days of the Internet, Kimball founded the APEC Emerging Infections Network in 1996, and led research and training programs in Surveillance and Informatics in Peru and Thailand.

In 2003 after supporting APEC/EINET, APEC formed a health task force which became formalized into a standing working group in 2007. Heading the National Alliance and the AIDS effort in Washington State, Kimball promoted the critical role local and state public health entities through the AIDSNET organization in Washington State.

As the HIV/AIDS pandemic reached the Asia Pacific Kimball advocated for public private partnerships to strengthen the weak public sector capacity in the region. She founded the Asia Pacific Alliance Against AIDS at the Yokohama global HIV/AIDS Conference, forerunner to the Global Business Council on AIDS founded in 1997.

Recruited to the Bill and Melinda Gates Foundation in 2012, Kimball led the development of a foundation wide infectious disease surveillance strategy which was presented and adopted in 2015. Concurrently she negotiated the development of Menafrinet, a surveillance system for meningitis across West and Central Africa co-led by national authorities, the CDC, and Medecins Preventif of France.

In her policy studies regarding novel human infections, Kimball has also discussed new challenges and health security against pandemic threats. Since 2015, she has served as a Senior Consulting Fellow for Chatham House, London. In 2019, she introduced Innovative fellowship program based on the strengthening of public health leadership in Africa. Her research indicated that Ebola virus disease crisis in West Africa revealed critical weaknesses in health policy and systems in the region, and emphasized the significance of innovative models in terms of enhancing the capabilities of emerging leaders. She also conducted a study in Peru in 2007, highlighting the role of internet as a tool to approach high-risk men who have sex with men. In her studies, she also discussed quantitative measurements regarding the impacts of cholera on international trade particularly in Mozambique, Kenya, Tanzania and Uganda in 1997.

In her research regarding COVID-19 and Spanish flu, Kimball stated that "The coronavirus mutates at a slower pace than flu viruses, making it a more stable target for vaccination." Furthermore, she focused on acquiring the immunity in order to survive the infection.

In 2006, Kimball published a book Risky Trade: Infectious Disease in the Era of Global Trade. Nitsan Chorev discussed the book as an "interplay between globalization, trade and travel, and infectious diseases." Núria Torner states that the "book raised interesting questions on infectious diseases and offered new insights into what future challenges may face mankind" and also discussed how it gives a reader "a thorough insight into how our "modern" civilisation, with its so-called globalisation trends, has upset the balance between natural barriers and infection spread." Andrew Price-Smith reviewed that the author of the book "provides an excellent critique of health governance at the domestic level within the United States."

== Awards and honors ==
- 1972 - President, ASSU Council of Presidents, Stanford University
- 1975 - Alpha Omega Alpha
- 1992 - Secretary of HHS, Recognition Award, Department of Health (DOH) Division of HIV/STD and AIDSNETS
- 1992-1993 - chair, National Alliance of State & Territorial AIDS Directors (NASTAD), Washington District of Columbia (DC)
- 1993-1996 - President, EIS Alumni Association, CDC
- 2000 - Fellow, American College of Preventive Medicine
- 2001 - Fulbright New Century Scholar Award
- 2004-2005 - Guggenheim Scholar Award, "Emerging Infections and Global Trade"
- 2008 - Nominee, Outstanding Women of Washington, UW Celebrating Women, Seattle
- 2011 - Professor, Emerita, Department of Epidemiology, School of Public Health, University of Washington
- 2016 - Bellagio Scholar, Rockefeller Foundation award "Planetary Health and Emerging Infections"

== Bibliography ==
=== Books ===
- Risky Trade: Infectious Disease in the Era of Global Trade (2006) ISBN 9781317062561
- Risks and Challenges in Medical Tourism: Understanding the Global Market for Health Services (2012) ISBN 9780313399350

=== Selected articles ===
- Kimball, A. M., Shih, L., Brown, J., Harris, T. G., Pautler, N., Jamieson, R. W., ... & Horwitch, C. (2003). International distance-learning outreach: the APEC EINet experience. International journal of medical informatics, 69(1), 57–62.
- Kimball, A. M., & Taneda, K. (2004). Emerging infections and global trade: a new method for gauging Impact. Rev Sci Tech, 23(3), 753–760.
- Kimball, A. M., Plotkin, B. J., Harrison, T. A., & Pautlet, N. F. (2004). Trade-related infections: global traffic and microbial travel. EcoHealth, 1(1), 39–49.
- Kimball AM, Lober B, Kobayashi J, Arima Y, Fox L, Brown J, Pautler N. (2004). Reporting, Surveillance and Information Exchange: The SARS Imperative for Innovation. Chapter 5, Learning from SARS: Preparing for the Next Disease Outbreak. Institute of Medicine, Forum on Microbial Threats.
- Kimball AM, Taneda K, Wong, K. An Evidence Base for International Health Regulations: Quantitative Measurement of the Impacts of Epidemic Disease on Global Trade. Scientific et Technique, OIE, Paris. Epiz., 2005, 24(3), 825–832.
- Kimball AM, Thant M. (2005, March 21). What Me Worry? AIDS at Davos. Lancet.
- Kimball AM. (2008). What are Factors of Emergence and How do they Work? International Encyclopedia of Public Health, 2, 552–563.
- Kimball AM, Moore M, French HM, Arima Y, Ungchusak K, Wibulpolprasert S, Taylor T, Touch S, Leventhal A. (2008). Regional Infectious Disease Surveillance Networks and their Potential to Facilitate the Implementation of the International Health Regulations. Medical Clinics of NA, MDC534, Vol 92, Issue 6.
- Kimball, A. M., & Heymann, D. (2014). Ebola, International Health Regulations, and global safety. The Lancet, 384(9959), 2023.
- Kimball, A. M. (2017). Emergence of Novel Human Infections: New Insights and New Challenges. International Encyclopedia of Public Health, 448.
- Dahn, B., Fallah, M. P., Platts, J., Moon, S., & Kimball, A. M. (2017). Getting pandemic prevention right. The Lancet, 389(10075), 1189.
- Kimball, A. M., Harper, D., Creamer, K., Adeyemi, A., Yates, R., Lillywhite, L., ... & Heymann, D. L. (2019). Strengthening public health leadership in Africa: an innovative fellowship program. Academic Medicine, 94(8), 1146–1149.
- Kimball AM, Arima Y, French HM, Osaki C, Hoff R, Lee SS, Schafer L, Nabae K, Hsun C, Hishamuddin P, Nelson R, Woody K, Brown J, Fox L. (2009). Pandemic influenza planning by videoconference. Journal of Telemedicine and Telecare, 15(7), 368–72.
