= Housemaid Debate =

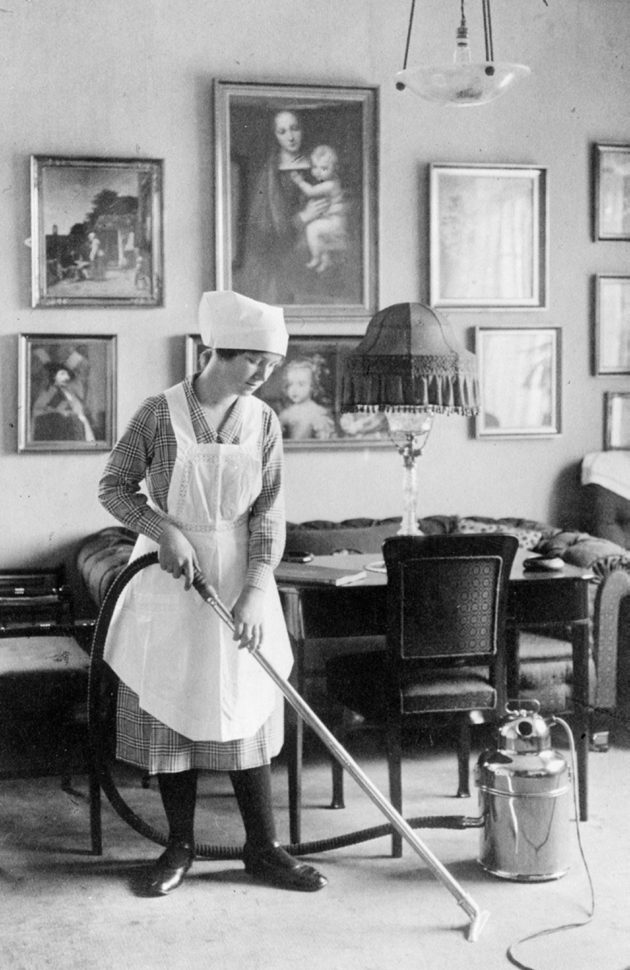
Some people referred to household employments of older days.

The Housemaid Debate or Maid Debate (Swedish: Pigdebatten) is a political discussion in Sweden, which began on 18 July 1993 when Swedish economist Anne-Marie Pålsson proposed tax deductions for household services.

Many right-wing politicians supported the proposal, meaning it would reduce unreported employment. Many left-wing politicians instead expressed negative thoughts, meaning it would increase social class gaps using parallels to the time before the 1970s when many girls were employed to live-in and work for wealthier families. The discussion has later reappeared, especially during elections in Sweden.

Tax deductions, so called RUT deductions for household services, were introduced in Sweden on 1 July 2007, during the centre-right Reinfeldt cabinet.
