= Anne-Marie Beukes =

South African academic

Prof Anne-Marie Beukes
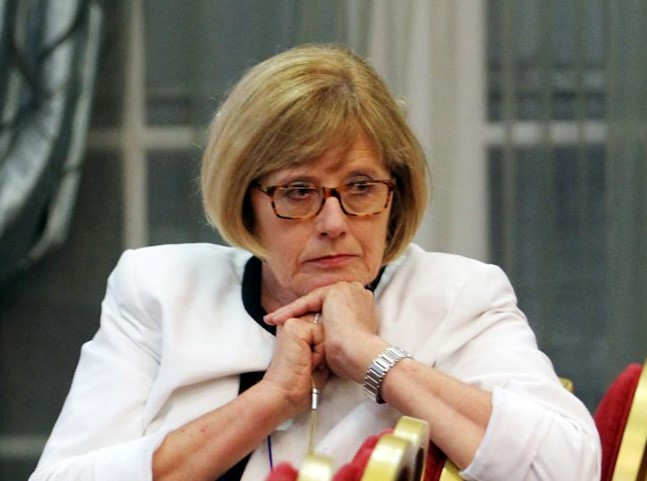
- Anne-Marie Beukes
- Born: 15 August 1950 (age 75)
- Citizenship: South African
- Occupation: Academic
- Title: Professor

Anne-Marie Beukes (born 15 August 1950) is a professor of Applied Linguistics at the University of Johannesburg. She was the chief executive officer of the Suid-Afrikaanse Akademie vir Wetenskap en Kuns between 2019 and 2024.

== Life and work ==
She matriculates at John Vorster High School in Nigel. She then obtains a B.A. degree in Languages at the then Rand Afrikaans University (RAU), an honors and master's degree in Afrikaans at the University of Pretoria and a D.Litt. et Phil. degree in Applied Linguistics at the RAU.

She began her career as a translator at the Transvaal Provincial Administration. A year after that she began teaching Speech Science at the Department of Speech Therapy at the University of Pretoria. In 1986 she starts lecturing in the Department of Linguistics and Literary Science at the RAU. From 1993 to 2003 she was head of the Language Planning Department of the National Language Service in the Department of Arts and Culture. Here she is closely involved in government projects regarding language management, such as the Language Plan Task Group (LANGTAG), the pilot project of the Telephone Interpreting Service for South Africa (TISSA), the Human Language Technology Project and the development of the National Language Policy Framework. After this she returns to the RAU (later the University of Johannesburg) where she is a professor in Applied Linguistics and until 2015 head of the Department of Linguistics. She teaches Translation Studies, Language Planning, Sociolinguistics, Cross-Cultural Communication and a number of other language practice courses. She serves as a Council member of the Pan-South African Language Council since 1996.

Since 1986 she has been involved with the South African Translators Institute and was elected chairman here in 2005, a position she held until 2013, after which she served as deputy chairman of the institute. She also represented this institute at the International Federation of Translators (FIT) for nine years from 1996 to 2005 and served as deputy president of FIT from 2003 to 2005. From 2005 to 2012 she served on the Training Committee of FIT. She is an accredited translator of English and Afrikaans. In 2014 she was elected chair of the Afrikaans Language Council (ATR). She is the vice-chair of the Minister of Arts and Culture's Expert Advisory Panel on Human Language Technology and also serves on the reference panel for the review and drafting of the White Paper on Arts and Culture for the Minister of Arts and Culture. She has served on the Council of the Suid-Afrikaanse Akademie vir Wetenskap en Kuns since 2015 and was elected CEO in 2019. She retired from the position of CEO in 2024.

Beukes's research interest is the sociology of language, language politics, language policy and -planning, and language management, as well as the sociology of translation. Her research is reflected in papers delivered at 28 international and 23 South African subject congresses, as well as 20 articles in local and international subject journals and eleven chapter-contributions in various books. She is a National Research Foundation-rated researcher and is currently working on an NRF-funded project on "Identity and the Black Afrikaners from Onverwacht".

She resides in Lynnwood Ridge in Pretoria.

== Writings ==
She is the author (together with Marné Pienaar) of "Multilingual Translation Terminology", a collection of approximately 200 translation terms in English and Afrikaans with corresponding definitions and practical examples, as well as equivalent terms in French, German, Spanish and Dutch. Furthermore, she writes several articles that appear in scholarly books and magazines. Her article on "Language policy incongruity and African languages in post-apartheid South Africa" which was published in the July 2009 issue of Language Matters: Studies in the Languages of Africa, is among the five most cited articles from this magazine in 2010.

== Publications ==
- 2010 – Multilingual Translation Terminology (together with Marné Pienaar)

== Sources ==
=== Magazines and newspapers ===
- Nel, Carryn-Ann: “Taalraad-hoof wil voetspoor vergroot” ("Language council chief wants to increase footprint"). “Beeld” newspaper, 12 November 2014
- Nel, Carryn-Ann: “Vriendelike taal, maar Afrikaans het bagasie” ("Friendly language, but Afrikaans has baggage"). “Beeld” newspaper, 20 December 2014

=== Internet ===
- La Vita, Murray. Netwerk24: Anne-Marie Beukes – 'n Vriendelike gesig-van-taal (The friendly face of the language)
- South African Translator’s Institute
