= Gilbert Blardone =

French economist (1925–2021)

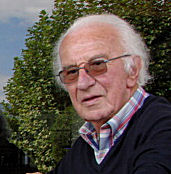
- Blardone in 2010
- Born: 10 February 1925; Évian-les-Bains, France
- Died: 21 March 2021 (aged 96); Évian-les-Bains, France
- Occupation: Economist

Gilbert Blardone (10 February 1925 – 21 March 2021) was a French economist.

== Biography ==
Born into a family of artisans, Blardone studied law, earning his law license. He then earned a doctorate in economic sciences from the Sorbonne. Once certified, Blardone began working for the Catholic University of Lyon and the Institut d'études politiques de Lyon as an associate professor. From 1960 to 1980, he served as director of the Institute for Applied Social Sciences of the Catholic University of Lyon, while also teaching economics at the Geneva Graduate Institute of International and Development Studies. He was a longtime friend and follower of François Perroux, a professor at the Collège de France. He was also a close friend of Maurice Allais, winner of the Nobel Memorial Prize in Economic Sciences.

In addition to his academic career, Blardone also worked for various commissions and journals. He was director of Chronique sociale from 1966 to 1972 and served on the General Commission of the Semaines sociales de France.

As director of the Institute for Applied Social Sciences, Blardone set up teachings on development economics in collaboration with several geographers, sociologists, political scientists, philosophers, and theologians. This multidisciplinary and applied approach to economic and social realities was noticed by and applied to the International Labour Office, the International Institute of Social Studies, the Graduate Institute of International and Development Studies where he taught, the Institute of Development Studies, and Senghor University.

Blardone later became Director of the Institut de sciences mathématiques et économiques appliquées. His research primarily focused on themes of population, technological and social progress, investment, and development. He also did research for the International Labour Organization. He was the founder and honorary president of the Association François Perroux in memory of his friend and economics professor at the Collège de France. After his retirement, he opened a blog with Le Monde.

Gilbert Blardone died in Évian-les-Bains on 21 March 2021 at the age of 96.

== Publications ==
- Initiation aux problèmes d’outre-mer : colonisation, décolonisation, sous-développement (1959)
- Initiation économique et sociale (1964)
- Le circuit économique (1964)
- Les investissements et la propagation de leurs effets dans les pays sous-développés (1964)
- Progrès économiques dans le tiers-monde : environnement socio-politique, croissance démographique et urbanisation (1972)
- Progrès économiques dans le tiers monde : population active, productivité, croissance et développement (1973)
- Population, progrès technique et social, développement économique et emploi : modèle socio-économique; application à une région rurale française (1978)
- De la ‘désarticulation’ au ‘développement global, endogène et intégré’ : le développement dans l’économique de François Perroux
- Chômage, défit extérieur, inflation… Comment en sortir ? (1981)
- L’interdépendance générale chez François Perroux et le bon usage de l’équilibre; introduction (1982)
- Vaincre le chômage (1987)
- Le système monétaire international (1989)
- Le Fonds monétaire international, l’ajustement et les coûts de l’homme : dégager de nouveaux chemins (1990)
- Économie de marché ou économie capitaliste ? (1992)
- La coopération industrielle des pays de l’OCDE : nouvelles tendances et nouvelles pratiques (1994)
- Fonds monétaire international, endettement du tiers monde et ajustement structurel : analyse méthodologique appliquée à Madagascar et à la Tanzanie (1995)
- Une double contradiction : libre échange et complexité du réel. (1995)
- La zone franc après la dévaluation. (1995)
- La zone franc et la monnaie unique européenne : la montée des inégalités. (1995)
- François Perroux : le centenaire d’un grand économiste (2005)
- La crise 2007-2014, Chronologie, analyse et perspectives
- Comprendre l'activité et les politiques économiques
