= Anne Murphy =

Anne or Annie Murphy may refer to:

- Anne Murphy in Hindawi affair
- Anne Murphy (mayor); see List of mayors of Stonnington
- Annie Murphy (comics); see List of Xeric grant winners
- Annie Murphy, Canadian actress

== See also ==
- Anne-Marie Murphy (disambiguation)
