= Anne-Marie Lacroix =

French writer

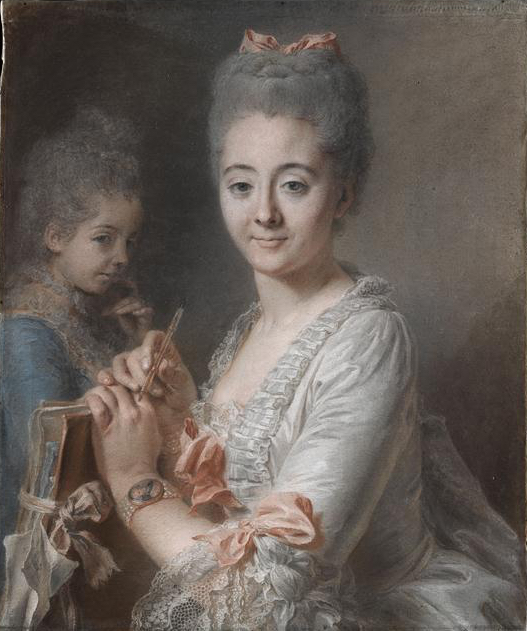

Anne-Marie Lacroix, née Anne-Marie Allotte de Chancelay (1732–1802) was a French writer.

== Biography ==
Born in Loudun, Lacroix was the daughter of Isaac Allotte de Chancelé or Chancelay and Anne-Élisabeth Boisseau; some sources claim a date of birth of 1736 instead.

She married Théodore Lacroix (1707–1777) at Bonneuil in 1757. The couple had two sons; the elder, François-Théodore (1760–1784), was a lawyer, while the younger, Jean-Louis Lacroix de Niré (1766–1813), was an author and civil servant. Through Jean-Louis she was the grandmother of playwright Jules Lacroix and bibliophile Jacob Lacroix. They were also the parents of a daughter, Suzanne-Félicité (1760– ), twin of François-Théodore.

In 1802, she published, anonymously, a three-volume novel titled Constantine, ou le danger des préventions maternelles.

A portrait of Lacroix by Jean Valade exists in which she is shown drawing a portrait of her daughter; she has been described by some writers as a pastellist on the basis of this image, but no other evidence is known.

== Selected works ==
- Constantine, Ou Le Danger Des Préventions Maternelles. Tome 1
- Constantine, Ou Le Danger Des Préventions Maternelles. Tome 2
- Constantine, Ou Le Danger Des Préventions Maternelles. Tome 3
