= Ann-Marie Nyroos =

Finnish diplomat

Ann-Marie Nyroos (born 24 May 1955 Turku) is a Finnish diplomat.

She has been Ambassador of Finland to Denmark since September 2013. Before that, she worked as a human rights ambassador at the Ministry for Foreign Affairs.

From June 2010 to February 2012, Nyroos served as Foreign Policy Advisor to the President of the Republic Tarja Halonen and a member of the Cabinet.

Prior to that she worked for the Ministry of Foreign Affairs since 1983. She served as Head of the Human Rights Policy Unit of the Ministry for Foreign Affairs between 1996 and 2002, Ambassador and Permanent Representative of Finland to the Council of Europe 2002-2007 and Finland's Ambassador to Croatia in 2007–2010.

Nyroos graduated from University of Turku with a master's degree in political science in 1981. She is married and has two children. Her spouse is an artist Teemu Kassila.
