= Ann Marie Ganness =

Trinidad and Tobago writer, journalist and former TV news anchor

- Occupation: Journalist
- Writing career
- Genre: non-fiction
- Notable work: Eighteen Lessons from Wayne

Ann Marie Ganness is a writer, journalist and former TV news anchor from Trinidad and Tobago.

Ganness worked in the Caribbean as a journalist and TV news anchor and won several journalism awards, including the Caribbean Broadcasting Union Merit Award in 1996 for Best News Feature, the Media Association of Trinidad and Tobago (MATT) and RBTT award for Best News Story —Television in 2004 and Luminary of Journalism awarded to her by MATT and BPTT in 2007.

Ganness is the author of Eighteen Lessons from Wayne, a non-fiction book. (Paperback: 108 pages. BalboaPress, January 24, 2014. Language: English. ISBN 1452589836 ISBN 978-1452589831)

== Personal life ==
Ganness migrated to the United States in 2014 after marrying opera and classical singer Michael Amante. The couple live in Vero Beach, Florida and Ganness is a public relations advisor to her husband's company.
