= Ann Marie Yasin =

Art professor in California, US

Ann Marie Yasin is an Associate Professor of Art History and Classics at the University of Southern California specializing in the architecture and material culture of the Roman and late antique world. She studies materiality, built-environments, landscapes, and urbanism as they pertain to the ancient and late ancient religious worlds.

== Biography ==
In 1993, Yasin earned her Bachelor of Arts from the University of Michigan, where she majored in Classical Archaeology and History of Art. In 1995, she received her Master of Arts in Art History from the University of Chicago with her thesis The Vienna Dioscorides: A Late Antique Document of Social Exchange. In 2002, she earned her Ph.D. in Art History, also from the University of Chicago. Her doctoral thesis was titled: Commemorating the Dead – Constructing the Community: Church Space, Funerary Monuments and Saints' Cults in Late Antiquity.

In 1997 and 1998, Yasin served as a lecturer at the University of Chicago; she continued as a lecturer here in 2001. In 2000, Yasin was the Assistant Director of the Classical Summer School at the American Academy in Rome. Between 2002 and 2005, Yasin taught at Northwestern University as an assistant professor in both the Department of Art History and a joint-appointment in the Department of Classics. Since 2005, Yasin has worked at the University of Southern California in the departments of Classics and Art History, advancing from Assistant Professor to Associate Professor in 2009. Yasin was a member of the American Council of Learned Societies Fellowship Program in 2018.

She published her first book Saints and Church Spaces in the Late Antique Mediterranean: Architecture, Cult, and Community in 2009, discussing the creation of sacred spaces through both lay and clerical actors alike during the fourth and seventh centuries.

Yasin has served as an Associate Editor and the Exhibition Reviews Editor for the journal Studies in Late Antiquity since 2016.

== Publications ==
=== Books ===
Yasin, Ann Marie. Saints and Church Spaces in the Late Antique Mediterranean: Architecture, Cult, and Community (Greek Culture in the Roman World). Cambridge, UK; New York: Cambridge University Press, 2009. ISBN 978-0521767835

==== Book chapters ====
- “Beyond Spolia: Architectural Memory and Adaptation in the Churches of Late Antique North Africa.” In North Africa under Byzantium and Early Islam, edited by Susan T. Stevens and Jonathan Conant, 215–36. Dumbarton Oaks Byzantine Symposia and Colloquia. Washington, D.C: Dumbarton Oaks Research Library and Collection, 2016. ISBN 978-0884024088
- “Making Use of Paradise: Church Benefactors, Heavenly Visions, and the Late Antique Commemorative Imagination.” In Looking beyond: Visions, Dreams, and Insights in Medieval Art and History, edited by Colum Hourihane, 39–57. The Index of Christian Art Occasional Papers 11. Princeton, NJ: Index of Christian Art, Department of Art and Archaeology, Princeton University in assoc. with Princeton University Press, 2010. ISBN 978-0976820284
- “Prayers on Site: The Materiality of Devotional Graffiti and the Production of Early Christian Sacred Space.” In Viewing Inscriptions in the Late Antique and Medieval World, edited by Antony Eastmond, 36–60. New York, NY: Cambridge University Press, 2015. ISBN 978-1316136034
- “Renovation and the Early Byzantine Church: Staging Past and Prayer.” In Prayer and Worship in Eastern Christianities, 5th to 11th Centuries, edited by Derek Krueger and Bruria Bitton-Ashkelony, First [edition]., 89–115. London ; New York: Routledge, Taylor & Francis Group, 2017. ISBN 978-1472465689
- “Sacred Installations: The Material Conditions of Relic Collections in Late Antique Churches.” In Saints and Sacred Matter: The Cult of Relics in Byzantium and Beyond, edited by Cynthia J. Hahn and Holger A. Klein, 133–51. Dumbarton Oaks Byzantine Symposia and Colloquia. Washington, D.C: Dumbarton Oaks Research Library and Collection, 2015.
- “Sacred Space and Visual Art.” In The Oxford Handbook of Late Antiquity, edited by Scott Fitzgerald Johnson, 935–69. Oxford ; New York: Oxford University Press, 2012. ISBN 978-0195336931
- “Shaping the Memory of Early Christian Cult Sites: Conspicuous Antiquity and the Rhetoric of Renovation at Rome, Cimitile-Nola and Porec.” In Cultural Memories in the Roman Empire, edited by Karl Galinsky, Kenneth D. S. Lapatin, and J. Paul Getty Museum, 116–32. Los Angeles: The J. Paul Getty Museum, 2015. ISBN 978-1606064627
- “Sight Lines of Sanctity at Late Antique Martyria.” In Architecture of the Sacred: Space, Ritual, and Experience from Classical Greece to Byzantium, edited by Bonna D. Wescoat and Robert G. Ousterhout, 248–80. Cambridge ; New York: Cambridge University Press, 2012. ISBN 978-1107008236
- “The Pilgrim and the Arch: Channeling Movement and Transforming Experience at Late Antique Holy Sites.” In Excavating Pilgrimage: Archaeological Approaches to Sacred Travel and Movement in the Ancient World, edited by Wiebke Friese and Troels Myrup Kristensen, 166–86. Routledge Studies in Pilgrimage, Religious Travel & Tourism. London ; New York: Routledge, Taylor & Francis Group, 2017. ISBN 978-0367896058
