= Élisabeth Beton Delègue =

French diplomat

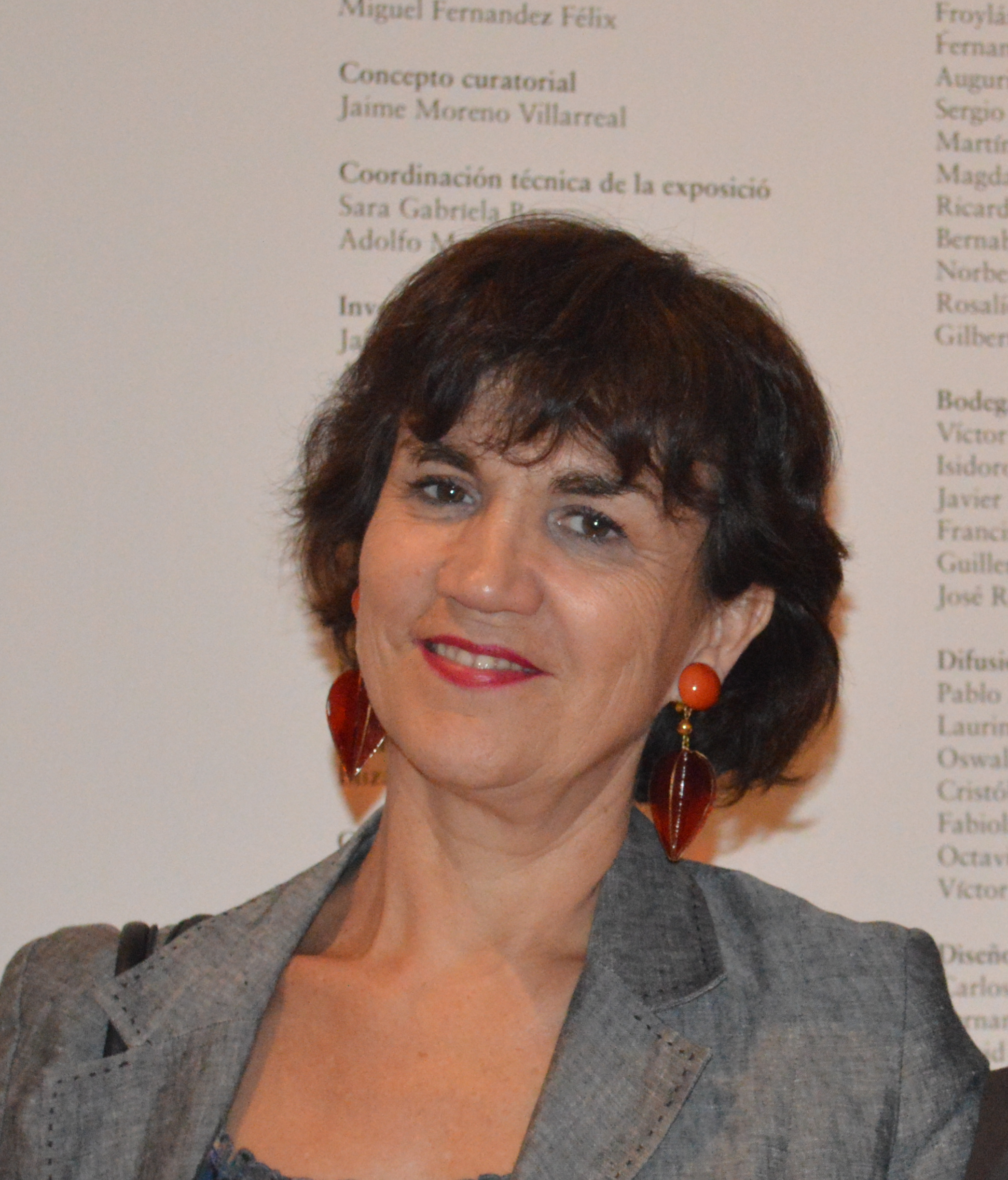
Elisabeth Beton Delègue 2012

Élisabeth Beton-Delègue (born January 2, 1955, Bron) is a French diplomat who has been their ambassador to the Holy See since her appointment on April 10, 2019. She has also served as Ambassador to Chile (2005-2008), Director of the Americas and the Caribbean at the Ministry of Europe and Foreign Affairs (2008-2012), and Ambassador to Mexico (2012-2014), Deputy Inspector General of Foreign Affairs (2014-2015), and Ambassador to Haiti (2015-2018).

Beton Delègue is the first female ambassador to the Holy See from France.
