= Marie-Anne Cohendet =

French political scientist

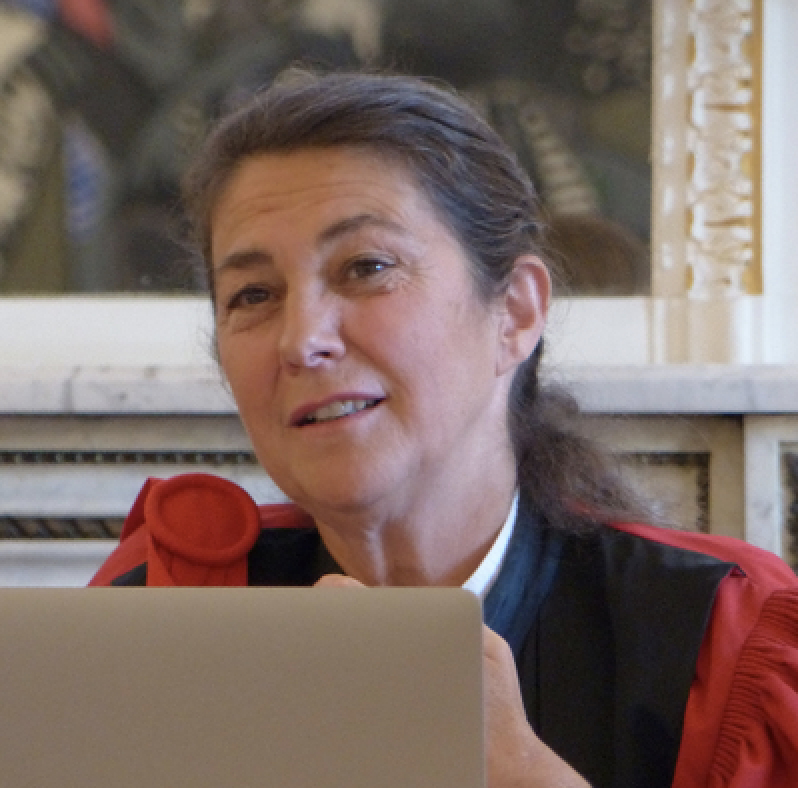
- Education: Jean Moulin University Lyon 3
- Scientific career
- Fields: Political science; Constitutional law
- Workplaces: Jean Moulin University Lyon 3; Lumière University Lyon 2; Institut d'études politiques de Lyon; University of Paris 1 Pantheon-Sorbonne
- Doctoral advisor: Pierre Vialle

Marie-Anne Cohendet is a French political scientist and expert in constitutional law. She is a professor in the faculty of public law at the University of Paris 1 Pantheon-Sorbonne. Cohendet studies the constitutional and institutional structure of French politics, and she has also written on potential democratic reforms to the French political system.

== Education and professional positions ==
Cohendet graduated in 1991 from the Jean Moulin University Lyon 3 with a doctorate in political science. She wrote her doctoral dissertation on the period between 1986 and 1988 when the President of France faced an antagonistic majority in the French Parliament, with a particular focus on the unprecedented strain that this situation put on French political and legal institutions. Cohendet's thesis was called L'épreuve de la cohabitation : mars 1986–mai 1988, and was supervised by Pierre Vialle. It was successful in the public law agrégation of 1992.

In September 1992, Cohendet was appointed to the faculty of Jean Moulin University Lyon 3. She was subsequently a professor at Lumière University Lyon 2 and at Institut d'études politiques de Lyon. She was then appointed to The University of Paris 1 Pantheon-Sorbonne.

== Work ==
Cohendet developed her thesis into a book on the same topic, published in 2003 and entitled La cohabitation, leçons d'une expérience. She has also written books on constitutional law, the nature of the French presidency, and the research methods used in the study of public law.

In 2015, Cohendet was a member of the Claude Bartolone commission on the future of institutions in the French National Assembly, which was tasked with evaluating the political institutions of the French Fifth Republic and suggesting possible political or constitutional modifications to them.

Cohendet was a co-author, with Dominique Bourg, Bastien François (Fr), Loïc Blondiaux (Fr) and Jean-Michel Fourniau, of a 2017 report for the Nicolas Hulot Foundation for Nature and Man called Osons le Big Bang démocratique, which outlines how a constituent assembly could be created in France. She also co-authored, with Jérôme Lang (Fr), Jean-François Laslier (Fr), Frédéric Sawicki (Fr), and Thierry Pech (Fr) a 2017 report for the think tank Terra Nova that recommended that France adopt a mixed electoral system in which at least a quarter of deputies to the federal assembly are elected through proportional representation. A 2018 report co-authored by Cohendet for Terra Nova proposed a citizens' initiative referendum in which one hundred randomly chosen citizens would receive, summarize, and distribute information about public referendums.

Cohendet's work has been cited, or she has been interviewed, in media outlets including France 24, France Culture, and Le Monde.

== Selected works ==
- La cohabitation, leçons d'une expérience, P.U.F., Recherches politiques collection (2003)
- Méthodes de travail en droit public, Montchrestien (1994, reprinted in 1995 and 1998)
- Le Président de la République, Dalloz, Connaissance du droit collection (2002)
- Droit constitutionnel, L.G.D.J., collected works (2013)
