= Anne Marie Murphy =

Anne Marie Murphy may refer to:

- Anne-Marie Murphy, Irish air passenger and central figure in the Hindawi affair
- Anne Marie Murphy (1960 – 2012), American teacher murdered in the Sandy Hook Elementary School shooting
- Anne-Marie Murphy, Australian regional police commander, Northern Territory; see Crime in Alice Springs

== See also ==
- Anne Murphy (disambiguation)
