= Marie Anne Carrelet de Marron =

French artist and playwright (1724–1778)

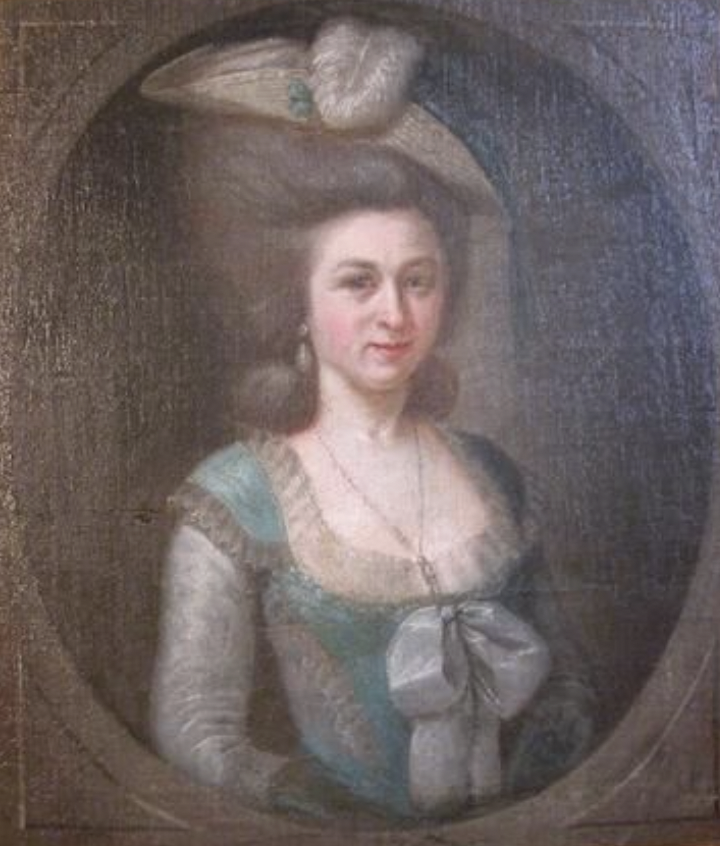
Portrait believed to be of Marie-Anne Carrelet de Marron

Marie-Anne Carrelet de Marron, also known as Madame de Marron, Baronne de Meillonnas (1724–1778) was a French painter, ceramic decorator, poet, and playwright of the Enlightenment period. Born in Dijon, she became one of the most prolific female dramatists of eighteenth-century France while also gaining recognition as a visual artist and porcelain painter.

Her work was praised by Voltaire and by the astronomer and man of letters Jérôme de Lalande.

== Early life and family ==
Marie-Anne Carrelet was born in Dijon on 14 December 1724 to Antoine Carrelet de Loisy, receveur général des finances for Burgundy and Bresse, and Marie-Marguerite Anglard. The Carrelets were a prominent Burgundian family, ennobled in the sixteenth century, and her father possessed significant wealth, with an estate valued at over two million livres.

Active as an artist from an early age, Carrelet was producing large-scale paintings by the age of twenty. Some of these, including her Conception, were displayed at the Church of Notre-Dame of Dijon.

At the age of 27, Carrelet married Gaspard-Constant-Hugues de Marron, lord of Neuville-sur-Ain and baron of Meillonnas, acquiring the title Baronne de Meillonnas. The couple had two sons, Antoine-Bernard-Constant and Pierre-Marie-Gabriel.

== Ceramics ==
After their marriage, Marie-Anne Carrelet and her husband acquired the château of Meillonnas, where they established a ceramic manufactory in 1761. The region had long been known for ceramic production due to the availability of high-quality local clay, and potters had been active in the area since the late Middle Ages. Carrelet de Marron oversaw the manufactory's artistic direction, selecting forms, designs, and motifs, with a particular emphasis on floral bouquets including hyacinths, roses, violets, and tulips, often depicted with ribbons. While she did not consistently paint the pieces herself, she supervised their decoration and ensured that functional items, including pichets, soupières, salières, jardinières, and fontaines, were both practical and artistically refined.

Carrelet de Marron's guidance shaped the output of the manufactory from 1765 to 1778, a period noted for sophisticated decoration and individual artistic interpretation. Between 1769 and 1774, the couple built the Hôtel Marron de Meillonnas in Bourg-en-Bresse, a Louis XV style house designed by the local architect Jean Mailly. After their move there, the ceramic manufactory at Meillonnas continued under other directors, including Joseph Augustin Maurel and his brother Honoré Maurel.

== Literary career ==
Marie-Anne Carrelet de Marron began her literary work relatively late, around the age of 42, yet produced a notable body of plays within a decade. She wrote primarily in verse, creating a series of tragédies de société, or domestic tragedies intended for private performance, alongside several comedies.

Among her known plays are:

- Sophonisbe (1767)
- Macarie ou les Héraclides
- Childéric
- Le Comte d’Harville
- Les Atrides (1769)
- Antigone
- Clarice (comedy in three acts)
- Le Bon frère ou l’École des pères (1773)
- Valérie
- La Comtesse de Fayel (1770)
- Cyrus (unfinished, 1777)
- Déjanire à Illus (heroïde)

== Reputation ==
Madame de Marron's dramatic work was noted by some of her prominent contemporaries. In a letter written on 19 October 1768 to the astronomer Joseph‑Jérôme de Lalande, Voltaire praised her productivity and ease of composition, writing: "It is true that nothing is more remarkable for a lady than to produce three tragedies in four months and compose a fourth. It is difficult to write a good one in a year; Phèdre took Racine two years. But even if there were flaws in the aforementioned works of Madame de Marron, that speed and ease would still be a marvel."

Lalande also praised her prodigious nature: "On 5 and 6 October 1768, Madame de Marron de Meillonnas read to me her tragedies Les Héraclides and Childeric, in beautiful verse, which she had composed since last winter, as well as Sophonisbe… it is a prodigy of fertility. Hardly a correction can be found in her manuscript". After her death, Lalande composed an éloge in her honour, later published in the Nécrologe des hommes célèbres de France.

== Death ==
Marie-Anne Carrelet de Marron died on 14 December 1778 from a chest-related edema at Bourg-en-Bresse. She survived her younger son, Pierre-Marie-Gabriel, who served in the fleet of Commander Comte d’Estaing in 1787. Her elder son Antoine-Bernard-Constant was condemned to death by the Revolutionary Tribunal of Lyon on 14 February 1794 (26 Pluviôse, Year II) and executed the same day alongside his cousin François-Catherin de Marron de Belvey. Both were killed for their loyalty to the monarchy.
