= X International AIDS Conference, 1994 =

The X International AIDS Conference, 1994 was held in Yokohama, Japan. The theme of the conference was "The Global Challenge of AIDS: Together for the future".

== AIDS in Japan before the conference ==
In 1994 the media identified only four Japanese citizens in Japan who would publicly admit to being HIV positive. Only 800 cases of HIV had been reported in Japan to this time, and the public perception was that HIV was a disease for foreigners.

Various groups asserted that persons in Japan who lived with HIV would face discrimination. In preparation for the event, the Ministry of Health appealed to restaurants, hotels, and hospitals not to refuse service to anyone because of their HIV status.

== Highlights ==
Guests at the opening ceremony included Prime Minister Tomiichi Murayama and Crown Prince Naruhito.

Attendees found that few advances had been made to treat HIV infection with standard antiretroviral therapy. The mood at the conference was pessimistic.

For reasons including a consensus was that no conclusive clinical advances were being made, organizers decided to change the event from an annual event to a biennial event after this one.
