= Ann-Marie Pendrill =

Swedish physicist

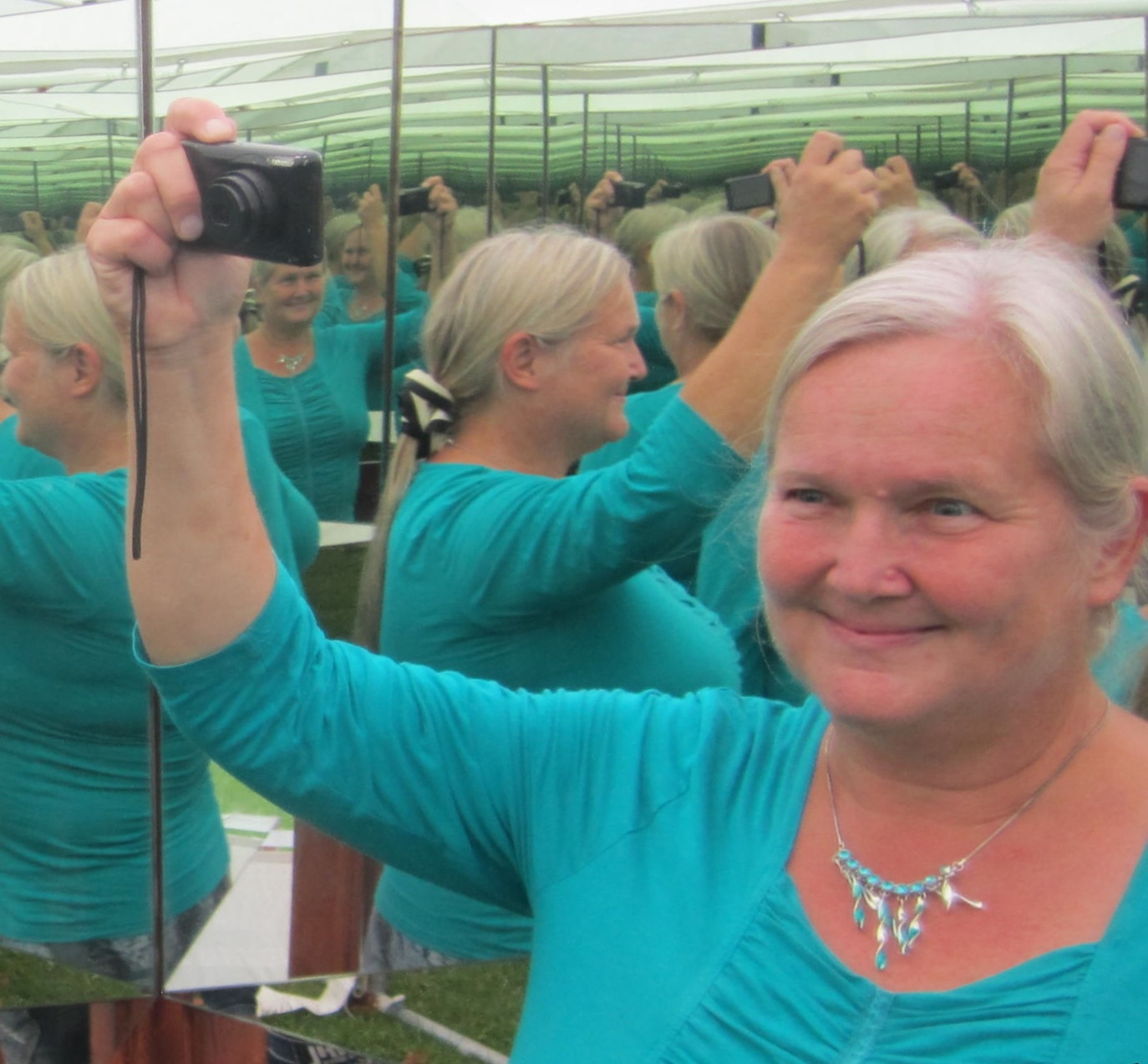
Ann-Marie Pendrill, Lund 2014

K. Ann-Marie Mårtensson-Pendrill (born 1952) is a Swedish physicist. Originally working in atomic physics, her interests gradually shifted towards physics education, and she has published many works on the physics of playgrounds, and amusement park rides such as roller coasters, including the book Physics for the Whole Body in Playgrounds and Amusement Parks (AIP Publishing, 2021). She is a professor emeritus at the University of Gothenburg, senior professor at Lund University, and the former director of the National Resource Centre for Physics Education.

== Education and career ==
After earning a Ph.D. at the University of Gothenburg in 1978, with Ingvar Lindgren as her doctoral advisor, Pendrill became a postdoctoral researcher at the University of Washington and then the University of Oxford, before earning a habilitation at the University of Gothenburg 1984. By 1999, she had become a full professor at the University of Gothenburg. In 2009, she started splitting her time between Gothenburg and Lund, where she directed the National Resource Centre for Physics Education.

== Recognition ==
In 1997, Pendrill was named a Fellow of the American Physical Society (APS), after a nomination from the APS Forum on International Physics, "for her contributions to the development and use of atomic many-body methods to explore relativistic effects and parity non-conservation in heavy atoms".
