= Anne-Marie Pålsson =

Swedish politician and economist

- In office 2002–2010

Personal details
- Born: 23 April 1951 (age 74)
- Party: Moderate

Anne-Marie Pålsson, born 23 April 1951, is a Swedish politician of the Moderate Party and economist. She was a member of the Parliament of Sweden from 2002 to 2010. She is also known for starting the Housemaid Debate in July 1993.
