= Marie Anne de Bourbon (disambiguation) =

Marie Anne de Bourbon (1666–1739) legitimised daughter of Louis XIV of France and Louise de La Vallière, wife of Louis Armand I, Prince of Conti.

Marie Anne de Bourbon may refer to:

- Marie Anne de Bourbon (1678–1718), daughter of Henri Jules, Prince of Condé and Anne Henriette of Bavaria, wife of Louis Joseph, Duke of Vendôme
- Marie Anne de Bourbon (1689–1720), daughter of François Louis, Prince of Conti and Marie Thérèse de Bourbon, wife of Louis Henri, Duke of Bourbon
- Marie Anne Éléonore de Bourbon (1690-1760) daughter of Louis, Prince of Condé and Louise Françoise de Bourbon
- Marie Anne de Bourbon (1697–1741), sister of the above
