= Marie-Anne de Lachassaigne =

French actress

Marie-Anne de Lachassaigne (1747–1820), was a French stage actress.

She was engaged at the Comédie-Française in 1765. She became a Sociétaires of the Comédie-Française in 1769. She retired in 1804.

She was a successful character actor.
