= Ann Marie Craig =

Canadian neurologist

Ann Marie Craig (born 4 June 1961, in Ithaca, New York) is a Canadian neurologist researching synaptogenesis and synaptic plasticity. She is a tenured Professor of Psychiatry and holds the Canada Research Chair in Neurobiology at University of British Columbia.

== Education ==
Marie Craig did her BSc. in biochemistry from Carleton University and received her PhD from University of Western Ontario. She was a postdoctoral fellow at National Institutes of Health, USA and University of Virginia in the field of neuroscience.

== Honors ==
She was awarded with a Pew Scholarship in 1977. In 2008, she was elected as a fellow of the Royal Society of Canada.
