= Ann-Marie Holmes =

Irish engineer

Ann-Marie Holmes FIEI, BAi
- Occupations: Engineering factory manager and Vice President
- Title: Vice President
- Board member of: American Chamber of Commerce
- Awards: Fellow of Engineering

Academic background
- Education: Trinity College Dublin

Academic work
- Discipline: Engineering and maths
- Institutions: Intel Ireland

Ann-Marie Holmes BAI FIEI is an Irish Engineer currently working at Intel Ireland as a factory manager and vice president of the company. She is also on the board of directors for the American Chamber of Commerce, Ireland. She has numerous times advocated for greater diversity in the technology industry, especially in regard to women in engineering.

== Background and education ==
Holmes grew up in Roscommon Town, County Roscommon in Ireland. She graduated with a Bachelor's degree in Engineering and Maths from Trinity College Dublin in 1991. She is married, and has two children.

== Career ==
After graduating from Trinity College Dublin, Holmes joined Intel as a process engineer in 1991. She has worked in all four Intel fabrication and sort manufacturing facilities in Ireland; Fab10, Fab14, Ireland Fab Organization, and Fab 24. In Fab 10, she was a process engineer before being promoted and becoming a Diffusion Group leader in Fab 14. In 2001, she became the transfer manager in Fab24 located in Leixlip, Co.Kildare.

She became a factory manager in 2012, where she had the responsibility for delivering 65/90 nanometer Best in Class results and preparing the organization for new technology.

After a $5 billion Investment in the facilities by Intel, she is now responsible for running the 14nm process technology node. She oversees all manufacturing at the Fab 24 site, which Intel purchased in 1989, and has since invested over $15 billion into. This makes it the largest private investment ever in the Irish state. She also oversees and manages the Leixlip site.

== Achievements ==
In 2016, she was named vice president of Intel’s technology and manufacturing group. This makes her only the 8th Irish person and 3rd Irish woman to be promoted to such a senior role at the company.

In 2016, she became a Fellow of Engineering. This is the highest level of achievement one can receive from Engineers Ireland, which recognizes her as a "highly-skilled professionals who help to shape, influence and inspire both engineers and the future of the engineering industry". Holmes has worked in Intel her whole career, over 27 years.
