= National Language Services =

The National Language Service (NLS) promotes and facilitates communication across languages in South Africa.

The core objective of the NLS is to meet the language requirements of the constitution by facilitating, promoting, and providing translation and editing services in all the official languages, and by managing language diversity through language planning and terminology projects.

The NLS functions as the Government's professional language support system by translating official documents into all the official languages. Its terminology service assists with the development and modernisation of the technical vocabularies of the official languages. The language planning functions include advising the Government on the development of language policy and implementation strategies.
