= Troupe of the Comédie-Française in 1790 =

- 1680
- 1752
- 1754
- 1755
- 1772
- 1790

The troupe of the Comédie-Française in 1790 was the company of actors, actresses, dancers, and musicians active at the Comédie-Française during the theatrical year beginning 12 April 1790 and ending 16 April 1791. The troupe formed part of the historic succession of companies associated with the Comédie-Française, one of the oldest national theatres in the world. The composition listed here includes the principal actors and actresses of the company alongside the dancers and orchestra members who supported productions during that period.

== Composition of the troupe of the Comédie-Française in 1790 ==
The theatrical year began 12 April 1790 and ended 16 April 1791.

Directors : the Actors
Actors	Actresses
Molé	Bellecour
Larive	Vestris
Dugazon	Giguet
Desessarts	Lachassaigne
Dazincourt	Suin
Fleury	Saint-Val
Belmont	Raucourt
Vanhove	Contat
Dorival	Thénard
Saint-Prix	Joly
Saint-Fal	De Vienne
Naudet	Émilie Contat
Dunant	Petit
Grammont	Lauréat
Larochelle	Candeille
Talma	Desgarcins
Roga	Fleury
Marsy	Masson
Marchand	Charlotte
Champville	Lange
Deshayes	Simon
Gérard	
Grand-Ménil	
Dancers	Female dancers
Deshayes, ballet master	Mlle Collomb, first dancer
Nores, first dancer	Aimée, danseuse en double
Doucet, danseur en double	Bourgeois, danseuse en double
Marchand	Dantié
Gignet	Bourgeois the young
Cosson	Durand
Évrard	Duchaumont the elder
Audill	Védi
Mulot	Duchaumont the young
Rogat	Vaudrelant
Huot	Félicité
Chaudet, répétiteur
Orchestra
Baudron, 1st violin and composer	La Lance, 1st violin
Chaudet, 1st violin	Fillion, 1st violin
Rose, 1st violin	Marteau, 1st violin
Cunissy, 2nd violin	Fleury, 2nd violin
Rameau, 2nd violin	Milot, 2nd violin
Bertrand, 2nd violin	Hugot, 2nd violin
Rougeaux, alto	Prot, alto
André, oboe	Le Det, timpanist
Deshais, oboe	Ducreux, oboe
Pilet, oboe	Tuasch, bassoon
Dumonet, cor	Heins, cor
Jolet, bass	Chapelet, bass
Toutant, bass	Prunelle, bass
Gresset, double bass	Raoul, copyist

== Sources ==
- Almanach général de tous les spectacles de Paris et des provinces, pour l'année 1791, Paris 1791.
