= Julie Talma =

French dancer (1756–1805)

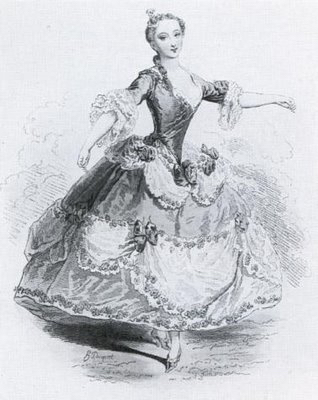
- Born: Louise-Julie Careau; 8 January 1756
- Died: 5 May 1805 (aged 49)
- Occupations: Dancer, courtesan, salonnière

Julie Talma, born Louise-Julie Careau (8 January 1756 – 5 May 1805), was a French dancer at the Paris Opera who became a courtesan in the years before the French Revolution. She had three sons by three different fathers. She used the gifts from her protectors to make a small fortune in real estate speculation. She married the well-known tragic actor François-Joseph Talma a few days before giving birth to twin sons. Her husband was unfaithful and ruined her. They separated and eventually divorced. Julie Talma was charming, intelligent, strong-willed, rational and a firm republican. She held an influential salon before and during the revolution and at the start of Napoleon's rise to power, and became a close friend of Benjamin Constant. Their lengthy correspondence has been preserved.

== Early years ==
Louise-Julie Carreau was born on 8 January 1756. Her mother was Marie Careau. Her father, Francois Pioch de Pézenas, did not recognise her until much later. Julie's mother abandoned her when she was very young. Pierre Gueullette de Maucroix, the king's adviser-in-Council of the Indies, rescued her from the streets. He taught her to read and write, taught her polite manners and after two years enrolled her in the Opera's ballet corps. As a dancer she performed in Jean-Philippe Rameau's ballet Castor et Pollux.

Julie Carreau became the mistress of François-Antoine de Flandre de Brunville, with whom she had a son, Alexis-Pierre-Louis (1777). She was then the mistress of the viscount Joseph Alexandre de Ségur, who established her in a private mansion and with whom she had another son, Alexandre-Félix Ségur (1781–1805). Ségur, who loved her, thought she would be the Ninon de l'Enclos of the 18th century. Finally she was the mistress of a M. Saint-Léger, who gave her a third son, Jules. All of her sons would die during her lifetime.

Julie Carreau used the money from her protectors in real estate speculation in the Chaussée d'Antin district, with architects such as Alexandre-Théodore Brongniart and Claude Nicolas Ledoux, and made a small fortune. She bought a town house on the Rue de la Chaussée-d'Antin in 1776. In 1781 the architect François-Victor Perrard de Montreuil sold her the Hôtel de Ségur, the house on the Rue Chantereine where Ségur had installed her. Julie Carreau held a salon in this house. Her private room was decorated with an anonymous frieze that represented the Arts, the Muses, Apollo, Venus and Cupid.

== Marriage ==
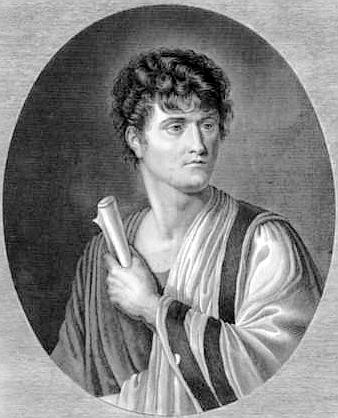
François-Joseph Talma

In 1787 Julie Carreau met François-Joseph Talma (1763–1826), an actor who had just started at the Comédie-Française, and they began an affair. Talma gave his support to the French Revolution in 1789, causing a split in the Comédie-Française. He took several leading democratic actors with him, including Monvel (Jacques Marie Boutet), Rose Vestris and Amélie-Julie Candeille. Juie became pregnant and the couple decided to marry. They had difficulty finding a priest who would perform the ceremony since Talma insisted on giving his profession as an actor, a sinful occupation, and therefore could not receive communion. After several months the vicar of Notre-Dame-de-Lorette agreed to marry them as long as Talma registered as a bourgeois of Paris rather than an actor. They married on 19 April 1791. François-Michel Talma, a dentist who was the actor's brother, was the witness.

On 30 April, twelve days after the ceremony, Julie gave birth to twin sons. The next day the infants were baptised Henri-Castor and Charles-Pollux. Another child was born, named Tell, who died on 31 May 1794. François-Joseph Talma met the actress Charlotte Vanhove, wife of the orchestra musician Louis-Sébastien Olympe Petit. They started an affair, and in 1794 Charlotte divorced her husband. During the 1790s Talma ran through his wife's fortune, but it was not until 1801 that François-Joseph and Julie Talma divorced by mutual consent. François-Joseph married Charlotte Vanhove the next year.

== Salonnière ==
"Mlle Julie" was far from an ordinary courtesan, and her drawing room soon became a bureau d'esprit, a place of intellectual discussion. Although Julie was not outstandingly beautiful, she was very charming and had a strong character. Alexander von Humboldt met her and said she clearly had more wit than other French women and was very patriotic. Julie had great respect for Mirabeau. After the publication of Mirabeau's letters, she remarked, "Infatuated friends—Mirabeau at their head—gave me the flattering nickname Aspasia. That was at the time [Nicolas] Chamfort was smitten by a terrible fever of love I had sparked in him, without the least intention of doing so." Mirabeau died at Julie Talma's house on the Rue de la Chaussée d'Antin on 2 April 1791.

The meetings organized by Madame de Lameth, Madame de Montmorin and Madame de Staël, and those held in the homes of Lucile Duplessis and Julie Talma, continued to play an essential role in the society of Paris after the revolution. Thomas Okey wrote,

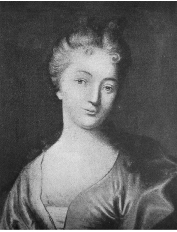
Louise-Julie Carreau by Léon-Pascal Glain

Julie Talma was famed for her literary and artistic circle. Here Marie Joseph Chenier, the revolutionary dramatic poet of the Comédie Française, declaimed his couplets. Here came Vergniaud, the eloquent chief of the ill-fated Gironde; Greuze, the painter; Roland, the stem and minatory minister, who spoke bitter words, composed by his wife, to the king; Lavoisier, the chemist, who is said to have begged that the axe might be stayed while he completed some experiments, and was told that the Republic had no lack of chemists."

A meeting at Julie Talma's home on 16 October 1792 had General Charles François Dumouriez, fresh from his victories in Belgium, as guest of honour. It was attended by leading Girondin politicians including Pierre Victurnien Vergniaud, Jacques Pierre Brissot and Jean-Baptiste Boyer-Fonfrède, accompanied by women of the stage. The comic mimic Fusil gave a performance. Amélie-Julie Candeille was singing at the piano when the doors burst open. The meeting was invaded by Jacobin members of the Committee of General Security led by Jean-Paul Marat, who denounced the general for keeping company with "such a collection of concubines and counter-revolutionaries". The next day the newspaper L'Ami du peuple proclaimed that citizen Marat had discovered a major conspiracy.

After Talma had ruined Julie he separated from her in 1795, leaving her to raise the twins. Julie had to rent her house on the Rue Chantereine. The lease was taken by Joséphine de Beauharnais and Napoleon Bonaparte, who settled there before their wedding. The 26 year old Napoleon would visit Josephine there every evening. Three years later on 11 Germinal year VI (31 March 1798) Julie sold the house to Napoleon. Under the Directory Julie Talma lived apart from her husband in a small townhouse she shared with her close friend Sophie de Condorcet. She kept a small court of admirers, including Benjamin Constant. Her salon on the Rue Matignon was frequented by prominent republicans and ideologues such as Pierre Jean Georges Cabanis. She welcomed men who were suspect to the Directory such as Alexandre Rousselin de Saint-Albin, Marie-Joseph Chénier, Dominique Joseph Garat, Pierre-Louis Ginguené and Claude Charles Fauriel.

== Friendship with Constant ==
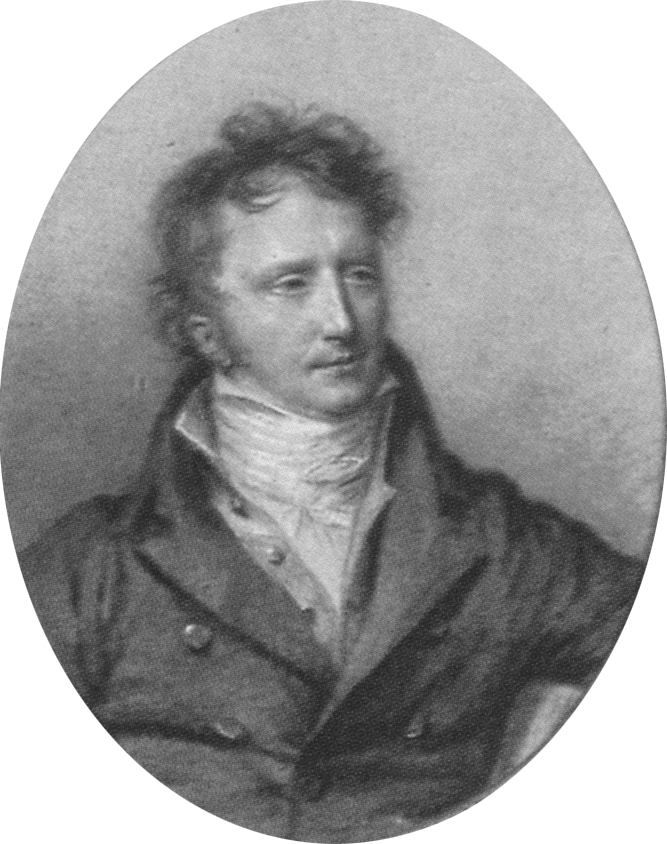
Benjamin Constant

Julie Talma met Benjamin Constant (1767–1830) at the Rue Matignon, and they began a long exchange of letters. Constant and Julie seem to have met in August 1795, perhaps introduced by Jean-Baptiste Louvet de Couvray (1760–97). As an extremely intelligent woman and a committed republican Julie appreciated Constant's outlook on the world. In the early summer of 1796 they often saw each other and became close friends, although probably they were never physical lovers. Harold Nicolson wrote of their relationship, "With gently sagacity she steered their affair into the calm lagoon of a devoted and outspoken friendship. She became the firmest as well as the most penetrating friend that Constant ever had."

Constant's Lettre sur Julie was published in 1829, long after he wrote it. He said that Julie Talma differed from other women because she had a realistic view of the relations between the sexes, and "understood and admitted that women who have given themselves and men who have gained what they wanted are in a precisely contrary position." After Napoleon's coup of 18 Brumaire (9 November 1799) Constant was elected to the Tribunate, which advised the First Consul (Napoleon). With Julie Talma's support, Constant took a bold public stance of opposing dictatorship and abuses of individual freedom. Around the end of 1799 Claude Hochet met Benjamin Constant and Madame Germaine de Staël at Madame Amélie Suard's salon in Paris. Hochet also became a friend of Julie Talma, Madame Juliette Récamier and Prosper de Barante. In mid-November 1800 Julie Talma introduced Anna Lindsay to Constant. They began an affair, but as Constant later told Julie, he loved and desired Anna but did not want her to sacrifice herself for him.

On 15 July 1804 Napoleon put on an elaborate ceremony with glittering costumes at the Church of the Invalides in which he personally awarded the first civilian Legion of Honour. Julie Talma described the event as the "distribution of the trinkets."

Félix de Ségur, Julie's last surviving son, died on 10 February 1805. Her grief destroyed her health, and by the middle of March she was clearly dying. Benjamin Constant was devastated by her approaching death, and went so far as to speculate on whether some part of a person might live on after their death. Julie Talma maintained the rationalist views of the Age of Enlightenment throughout her life, and when dying refused to receive a priest for her last rites. She died on 5 May 1805. She is reported to have said, "One should be able to start life over again. During the first performance, one doesn't know what one's doing."

== Publications ==
- Talma, Julie (1933). Lettres de Julie Talma à Benjamin Constant. La Palatine. introduction and notes by baron Constant de Rebecque. Paris: Plon et Nourrit.
