= Amélie-Julie Candeille =

French composer (1767–1834)

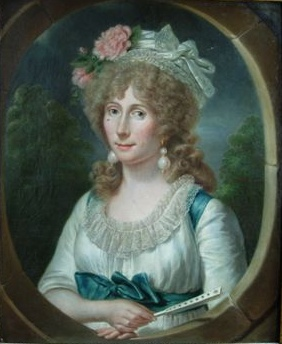
- Portrait by A. Labille-Guiard (1791)
- Born: 31 July 1767; Saint-Sulpice, Paris
- Died: 4 February 1834 (aged 66); Paris
- Occupations: Musician, singer, actor, playwright

Amélie-Julie Candeille (French pronunciation: [ameli ʒyli kɑ̃dɛj]; night of 30/31 July 1767, parish of Saint-Sulpice, Paris – 4 February 1834, Paris) was a French composer, librettist, writer, singer, actress, comedian, and instrumentalist.

== Life ==
=== Early life ===
Julie Candeille described herself in her Mémoires as having "bright blonde hair, brown eyes, white, fine and clear skin, [and] a soft and laughing air". According to her colleague Louise Fusil, Candeille was pretty, with "a well-taken size, a noble gait, [and] traits and whiteness as held by creole women". Her ancestry was actually Flemish, with no known Creole elements,

Candeille, like many women musicians of her time, came from a musical family. Her father Pierre-Joseph Candeille (1744–1827) was a composer, actor and low-bass opera-singer in the chorus, though he ended up exiled in Moulins where he became a theatre director. Her father was her primary teacher, and some have speculated that his deeply invested interest in his daughter's education was an effort to bolster his career. Candeille developed her natural talents for song and harpsichord and performed extensively while still a child in chamber orchestras. Aged 7 she played in a concert before the French king and she was said to have played a concert alongside the teenage Mozart. By the age of 13 she had performed in public as a singer, pianist and harpist. Aged 14, she was initiated into the "La Candeur" masonic lodge, in which she met several playwrights such as Olympe de Gouges and other influential figures who favoured her artistic career in Parisian society and the intrigues of the dying ancien régime. In her Mémoires, she records how she benefitted from protection by powerful figures such as the marquis de Louvois (an anti-establishment aristocrat and intimate friend of the chevalier de Champcenetz who was, like him, sent to the fort de Ham for misconduct), the music-loving duchesse de Villeroy (who led a mainly female salon whose influence also extended into the theatre), and the baron de Breteuil (minister of the king's household and possibly a lover of Candeille).

Through the influence of her protectors, at the age of 15 she debuted at the Académie royale de Musique on 27 December 1782 in the title role of Gluck's Iphigénie en Aulide, in which she had only moderate success. At 16 Candeille made her fortepiano debut at the Concert Spirituel, where she performed a concerto by Clementi-–by this time she was also already composing sonatas, romances and airs for the harpsichord and piano, some of which have recently been rediscovered. Aged 17 she debuted a concerto that she composed. A reporter from the Mercure de France said:

Miss Candeille, who has a very pleasing face and figure, brings to a special talent for the fortepiano, acquired as a composer, new claims to applause. The concerto, which she performed very well, is charmingly cast, and she cannot be too much encouraged in the cultivation of an art in which she promises so well.

In order to support her family, Candeille returned to the stage. She did not have a voice which could challenge Mme Saint-Huberty in the opera (Saint-Huberty had succeeded Mlle Levasseur and Mlle Laguerre), so she returned to the Comédie-Française on Monday 19 September 1785 as Hermione in Racine's Andromaque, receiving mixed reviews. During this time Molé was the protector of both Candeille and her friend Olympe de Gouge. Her strong personality and original ideas did not gain her friends and she was always held in low esteem by her colleagues in the Comédie française such as Molé, Dazincourt, Fleury or Mlle Louise Contat, who regarded her just as one of the Versailles courtesans. Candeille joined Talma and those among his actors who welcomed the French Revolution in 1789.

=== Playwright ===
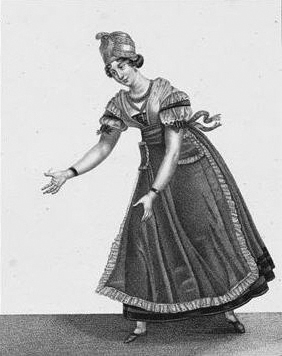
Candeille acting in Catherine ou la Belle fermière on the stage of the Théâtre-Français in 1792

In 1789, she took the rôle of the young slave Mirza in L'heureux naufrage, a three-act play by Olympe de Gouges denouncing the living conditions of slaves in the French colonies. This play formed the pretext for a clash between the representatives of France's powerful colonial slave-owning lobby and the Amis des Noirs, a club co-founded by Brissot, Condorcet and abbé Grégoire. After receiving mixed reviews on her performances for the Comédie-Française she left the company in 1789 and traveled in the northern provinces. Candeille composed her first pieces of dramatic music during her travels.

On her return to Paris, Julie Candeille was a star of the salons formed by the Amis des Noirs, and she is also known to have gone to the salons held by Mme de Lameth (also attended by Robespierre) and by Mme de Villette, Helvétius or Condorcet. It was during this era (1791) that Adélaïde Labille-Guiard, who shared Candeille's ideas, painted her portrait. The plays in which she advertised at the start of the Revolution had considerable success, such as those at the new Théâtre des Variétés Amusantes on rue de Richelieu and at the Théâtre de la République. The Revolution truly relaunched her career and she made several friends in advanced political circles. It is claimed that it was for her that Fabre d'Églantine wrote his romance Je t'aime tant, set to music by Garat. In 1790 she returned to the stage, joining the Théâtre de la République.

In 1792, she participated in a festival held by Talma and his company at their home on the rue Chantereine in honour of general Dumouriez, victor of the battle of Valmy, at which Marat (at the head of a group of "énergumènes") loudly announced himself. Most of the guests (such as Antoine-Vincent Arnault or Pierre Victurnien Vergniaud) were denounced the following day in l'Ami du peuple. It is said that Julie Candeille was then the lover of Vergniaud, who had become a brilliant orator for the Girondins. Later in 1792 she debuted her most famous opera, the 3-act prose comedy Catherine, ou La belle fermière, at the Théâtre-Français. Candeille wrote the words and music for the opera and performed in the title role. First put on during the trial of Louis XVI, it was performed over 150 times in the next 35 years and received some international acclaim, prompting numerous editions of arrangements of the airs with harp or piano accompaniment. However, the opera was a success she was never able to duplicate – none of the scores for her other comedic operas survive.

Michaud, author of a famous biographical dictionary of his contemporaries, inferred under the restoration that Candeille had played the Goddess of Reason in Republican festivities., though she provided evidence to deny this. However, the Goncourt brothers (not given to historical inaccuracies) support Michaud's charge. Compromised by her Girondin sympathies and too close to Vergniaud and other Girondins, in 1793 Julie Candeille was troubled by the authorities despite her popularity. She was the object of a denunciation and a search was ordered of her residence at rue Neuve des Mathurins, but thanks to the Montagnard deputy Julien de Toulouse (a member of the Committee of General Security) she managed to avoid being labelled a suspect and thus arrested.

=== "Citoyenne Simons" ===
Once the Reign of Terror was over, on a whim she married the young doctor known as citizen Laroche, though she never took his name. The Directoire period saw her confirm her popularity as an actress and a playwright. Jacques-Antoine-Marie Lemoine's portrait of her was exhibited at the Paris Salon in year three, and at the Salon the following year a charming miniature by Mme Doucet de Suriny showing Candeille in a striped dress and red belt writing a new play was also exhibited. The play she was shown writing was her second opera, a slightly scandalous five-act verse comedy entitled La Bayadère ou le Français à Surate. This was written so as to give her the title role and was put on in January 1795, but was not as successful as she had hoped. Some critics had suggested that her success with Catherine had been a result of her father assisting in composition, and after a critical article in the Journal de Paris suggesting the same of La bayadère just after its debut, Candeille published a passionate response:

When persecution pursues me, when injustice and calumny seek my ruin, I must, for my supporters – and myself – repudiate the treacherous insinuations of those who would still wish to rob me of public esteem after having cheated all my efforts to give pleasure.
Never did an insensitive pride, never did an arrogant pretension, guide me in the service of the arts. Submissiveness and necessity led me to the theater; propensity for and the love of this work emboldened me to write. These two sources united are my sole means or survival. The need to support my family, other more onerous responsibilities, my present needs, and above all the uncertainty of the future – these are my reasons for speaking out. I dare to believe that had they known, my detractors themselves would not have been able to resolve to make me the object of ridicule and aversion, while I become that of forbearance and countenance.

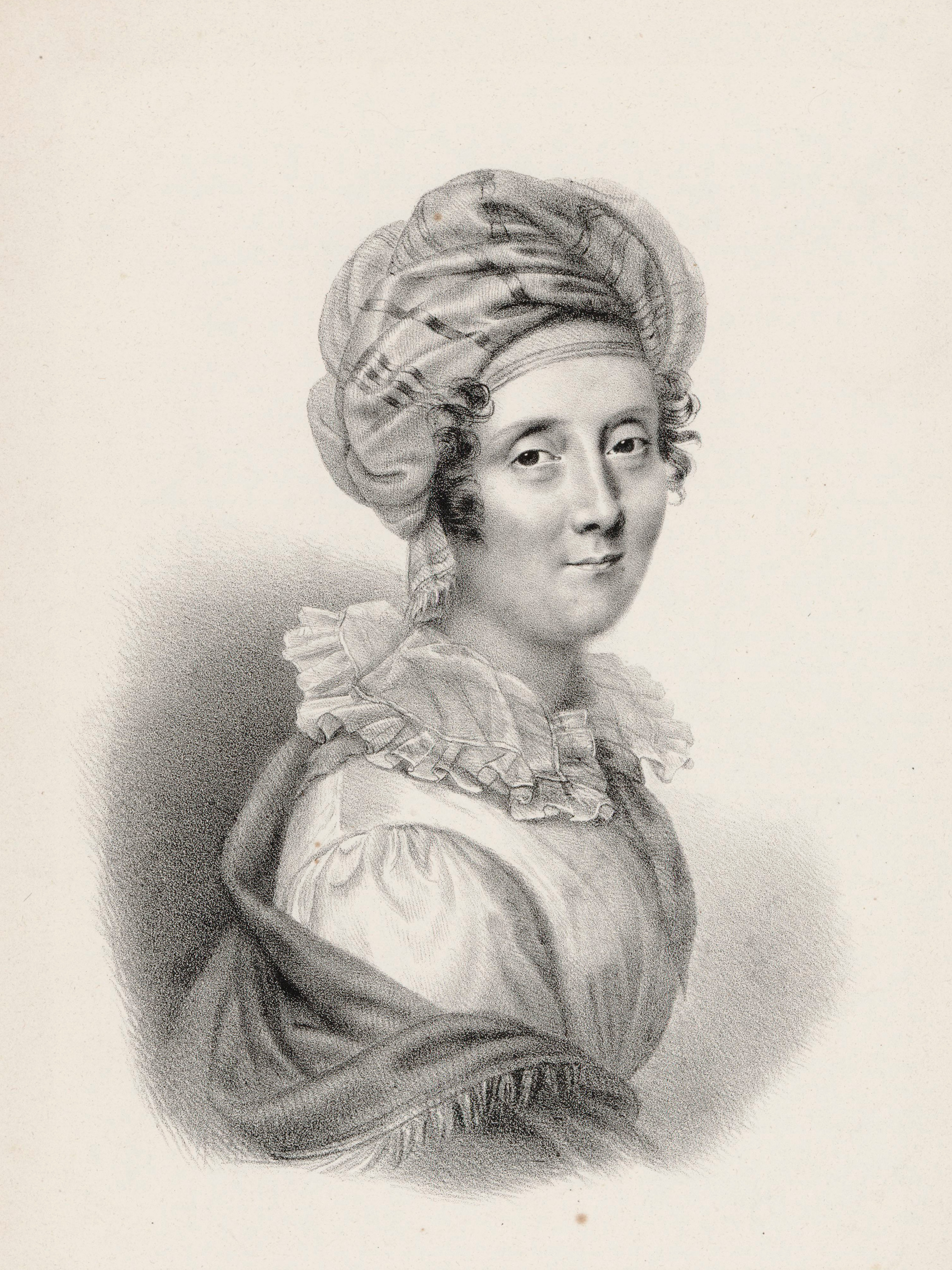
Candeille ca. 1810, engraving by Coeuré after Pierre-Paul Prud'hon

In 1797, the actress Élise Lange, old protégée and friend of Julie Candeille, married the businessman Michel Simons, himself the son of a Belgian coach-builder whom Mlle Candeille had met in Brussels in August 1796, having gone to the Belgian capital to put on her opera Catherine ou la belle fermière. Michel's father Jean Simons was not unfeeling to Candeille's charms and married her in Brussels on 11 February 1798 – she divorced Laroche and broke a theatre engagement to marry him, thus ending her theatrical career. The new Madame Simons from then on lived in luxury in Brussels and Paris. Like many parvenus of that era, the couple wanted a petite maison, which they had built at great expense to designs by Bellanger at pointe Bellevue, on the former Mesdames estate. It is said that she wanted to join her husband in his business activities and that she won him the commission to build Napoleon's carriage for his coronation via her friend Josephine (whom she had got to know in the salons) In 1803, Candeille and her former friend Mme Lejay, who had become comtesse de Pontécoulant, were in charge of Brussels' welcome for Napoleon and his wife.

When war resumed at the start of the First Empire, Jean Simons' business affairs declined and his wife retired to their Parisian hôtel particulier at 3 rue Cérutti, giving piano recitals at aristocratic soirées in the French capital. She also became the beneficiary of a pension bestowed on her by the new empress Marie-Louise. Throughout her life Julie Candeille welcomed, supported and encouraged young people and other women musicians, dedicating many of her works to Hélène de Montgeroult and Pauline Duchambge. Her protégés also included the young painter Girodet, with whom she had a wholly platonic liaison mainly conducted by letter. The adoptive son of doctor Trioson, Girodet became famous in 1793 for his Endymion, which put forward a newly aestheticised depiction of male anatomy. An undated drawing by Girodet shows him and Candeille in double profile – she is hardly recognisable, having seemingly sacrificed her long blonde hair for an "à la garçonne" haircut before that phrase existed. She addressed passionate letters to him, more playing the role of an accomplice and friend than that of a transitory lover, since she was so much older than him. She signed herself "your dear old Galatea" ("Votre vieille Galathée") and offered him the chance to be her amorous intermediary, knowing as she did from Girodet's homo-erotic drawings that his tastes were for other men.

== Works ==
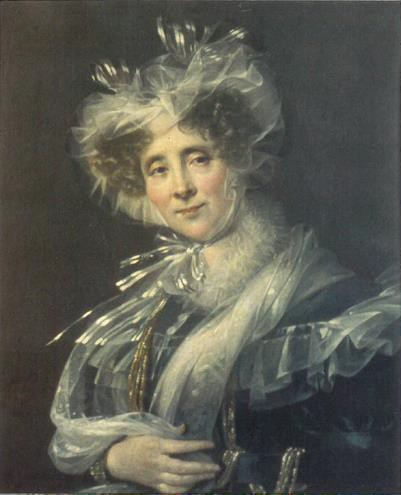
Portrait of Julie Candeille, 1828, by Aimée Brune-Pagès

=== Literature ===
Candeille was often criticized for her vanity, and her stage works received many unfavorable reviews in the Parisian papers. Candeille composed a total of 8 works for stage, only one of which (Catherine, ou La Belle fermière) is extant.

- Catherine, ou la Belle fermière, Paris, year II.
- La Bayadère, ou le Français à Surate, Paris, year III.
- Ida, ou l'orpheline de Berlin, play in 3 acts.
- Louise, ou la réconciliation.
- Lydie, ou les mariages manqués, Paris, 1809.
- Bathilde, reine des Francs, Paris, 1814.
- Vers sur la bonté.
- Justification de Julie Candeille en réponse à Audiffret.
- Souvenirs de Brighton, Londres et Paris, Paris, 1818.
- Agnès de France, ou le douzième siècle, Paris, 1821.

=== Music ===
Contemporary discussions of her music highlight the supremacy of melody and use of simple harmonies used throughout her works. She composed in the style of Grétry, whom she greatly admired. Her works for keyboard, which she composed for her personal performances, are virtuosic – her surviving musical works include a concerto for keyboard, three keyboard sonatas (some with violin accompaniment), and a duo for piano. Many other works are lost, including additional keyboard sonatas, duos, fantasias and variations. Modern editions of the concerto for keyboard, three arias and the overture from Catherine are available through Hildegard Publishing.

- Three sonatas for harpsichord, with violin accompaniment.
- Concerto for piano and strings.
- Two great-sonatas for piano, opus 8 (under the name Julie Simons).
- Fantaisie for piano (dedicated to Mme Rivière).
- Nocturne for piano (fantaisie n. 5, Op. 11).

== See also ==
- Troupe of the Comédie-Française in 1790

== Bibliography ==
- Goertzen, Valerie Woodring. "The Eighteenth Century." In From Convent to Concert Hall: A Guide to Women Composers, ed. Sylvia Glickman and Martha Furman Schleifer, 91–152. Westport, Connecticut: Greenwood Press, 2003.
- Letzter, Jacqueline and Adelson, Robert. Women Writing Opera: Creativity and Controversy in the Age of the French Revolution. Berkeley: University of California Press, 2001.
- Neuls-Bates, Carol. Women in Music: An Anthology of Source Readings from the Middle Ages to the Present. Boston: Northeastern University Press, 1996.
- Rushton, Julian, et al.: "Candeille, Julie", Grove Music Online (Accessed 14 February 2007)
- Sadie, Julie Anne. "Musiciennes of the Ancien Régime." In Women Making Music: the Western Art Tradition, 1150–1950, ed. Jane Bowers and Judith Tick, 91–223. Chicago: University of Illinois Press, 1987.
- (in French) Biography of Anne-Louis Girodet and Amélie-Julie Candeille, Bibliothèque nationale, département des manuscrits.
- (in French) Michaud, Dictionnaire biographique (article on Candeille).
- (in French) Arthur Pougin, Une charmeuse, Julie Candeille, Le Ménestrel, 7.10.1833.
- (in French) Th. Casevitz, "Une actrice femme de lettres au XVIIIe siècle, Julie Candeille", Revue hebdomadaire, Paris, October 1923.
- (in French) Jean Stern, "Le mari de Mlle Lange", Revue des questions historiques, vol. 176.

=== Iconography ===
- Olivier Blanc, Portraits de femmes, Artistes et modèles à l'époque de Marie-Antoinette, Paris, Didier Carpentier, 2006.

=== Discography ===
- Mostly Romantic Music by Women Composers. Sonata no. 1. Selma Epstein, piano. Chromattica (1987). 1 Sound cassette.
- Women Composers: an International Sampler. Grande Sonata no. 1. Selma Epstein, piano. Chromattica (1988). 1 Sound cassette.
