= Devienne =

Devienne is a French surname. Notable people with the name include:

- F. M. Devienne (1913–2003), French physicist
- François Devienne (1759–1803), French composer and flautist
- Sophie Devienne (1763–1841), French stage actress
