= Magdeleine-Marie Desgarcins =

French actress (1769–1797)

Magdeleine-Marie Desgarcins (1769 at Mont-Dauphin (Hautes Alpes) – 27 October 1797 in Paris) was a French actress. Her stage name was Louise Desgarcins or Madame Desgarcins.

In her short career she became one of the greatest of French tragédiennes, the associate of Talma, with whom she nearly always played. Her debut at the Comédie-Française occurred on 24 May 1788, in Bajazet, with such success that she was made sociétaire the following year. She was one of the actresses who left the Comédie-Française in 1791 for the house in the rue Richelieu, soon to become the Théâtre de la République, and there her triumphs were no less in King Lear, Othello, La Harpe's Mélanie et Virginie, etc. Her health, however, failed, and she died insane, in Paris, on 27 October 1797.

== See also ==
- Troupe of the Comédie-Française in 1790
