= Madelonnettes Convent =

Convent located in Paris, in France

Coordinates: 48°51′59″N 2°21′32″E

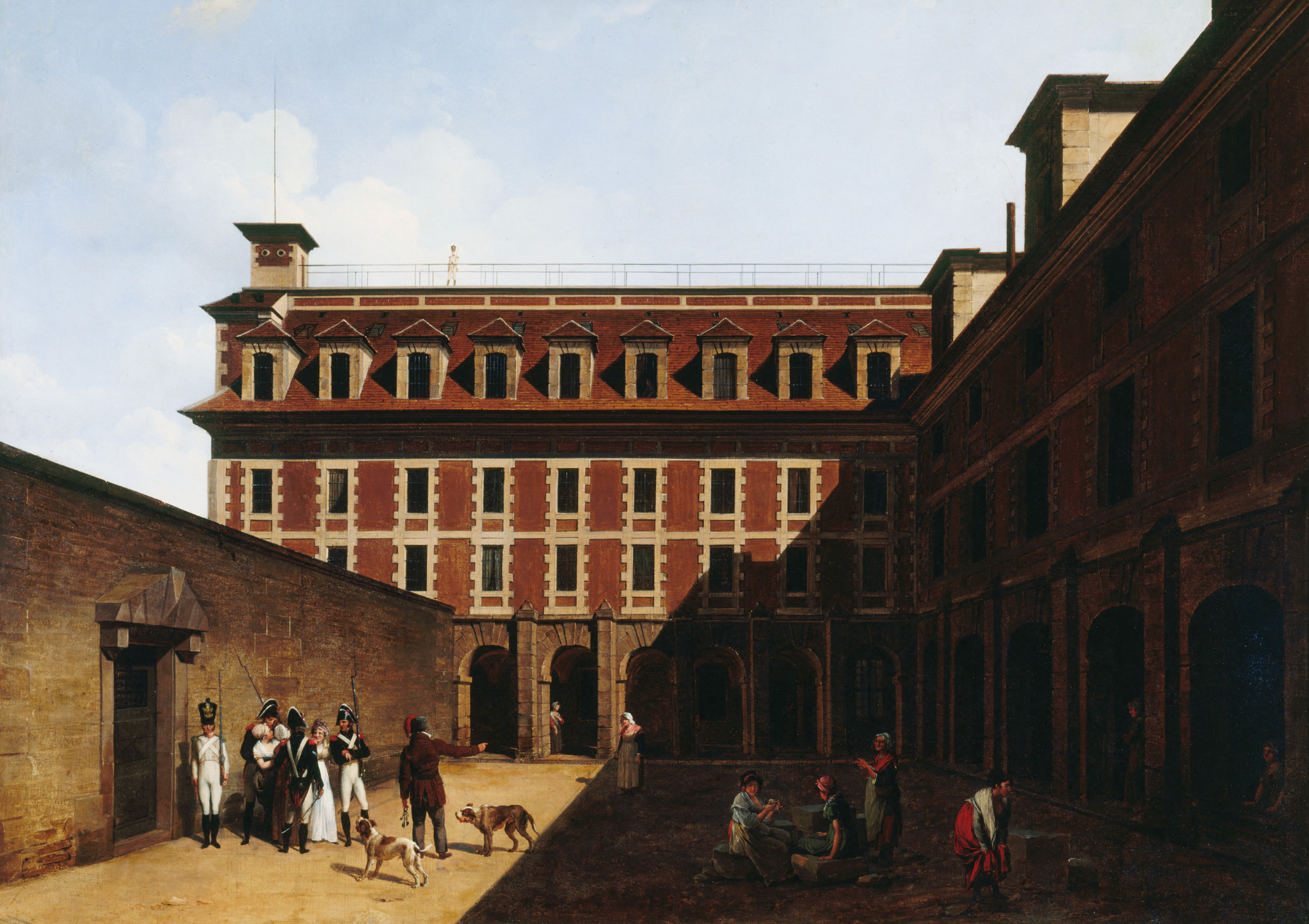
Louis-Léopold Boilly's La Prison des Madelonnettes (1805)

The Madelonnettes Convent (couvent des Madelonnettes) was a Paris convent in the 3rd arrondissement of Paris. It was located in what is now a rectangle between 6 rue des Fontaines du Temple (where there are the remains of one of its walls), rue Volta and rue du Vertbois, and part of its site is now occupied by the Lycée Turgot. As the Madelonnettes Prison (prison des Madelonnettes) during the French Revolution, its prisoners included the writers the Marquis de Sade and Nicolas Chamfort, the politician Jean-Baptiste de Machault d'Arnouville and the actor Dazincourt.

== Convent ==
=== Origins ===
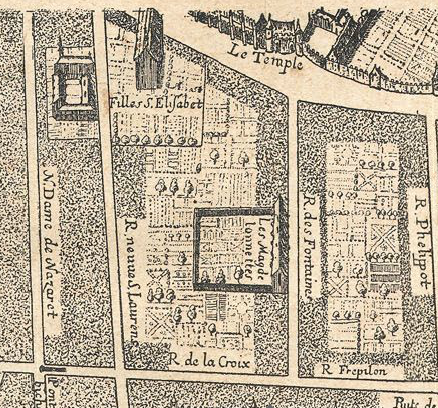
The Convent on Jacques Gomboust's 1652 map of Paris

Its origins date back to 1618, when the wine merchant Robert de Montry - after being rebuffed by the local prostitutes in his attempts to reform them - finally decided to put them back to the right path whilst being accommodated in his own home. With the aid of M. Du Pont (curé of Saint-Nicolas des Champs), the Capuchin Father Athanase Molé and M. de Fresne (an officer of the Gardes du Corps du Roi and a friend of Saint Vincent de Paul among others), Montry worked to spread his charitable work to other prostitutes. Quickly overtaken by their success, at first they rented rooms in the faubourg Saint-Honoré, before Robert de Montry lent them a house he owned in the quartier de la Croix-Rouge. A chapel for the house was improvised, served by Benedictines from Saint-Germain des Prés.

The idea of creating an actual convent was down to the patronage of Saint-Vincent-de-Paul and the generosity of the Marquise de Maignelay (née Claude-Marguerite de Gondi, sister of Jean-François de Gondi, archbishop of Paris), who, on 16 July 1620, acquired from sister Dubuisson a property in rue des Fontaines, between the Abbaye Saint-Martin des Champs and the Temple fortress enclosure, and left them 101,600 livres in her will. In 1625, Louis XIII granted them 3,000 livres in rents, and they were accorded a constitution by pope Urban VIII in 1630]. Most of the buildings were constructed in 1637, with the first chapel inaugurated by Anne of Austria on 22 March 1648 and a church built from 1680 onwards and consecrated on 2 September 1685.

=== History ===
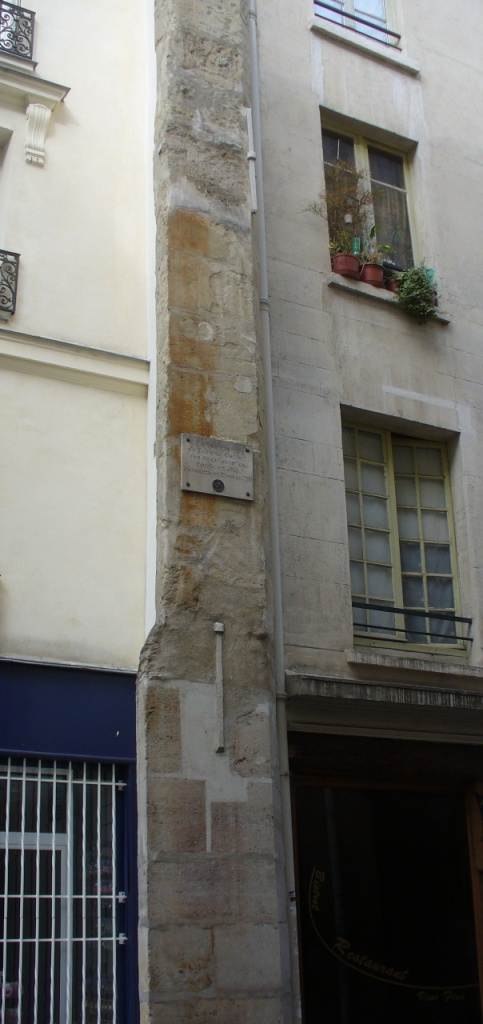
The site today

This large gathering of "sinners" freely choosing the way of redemption slowly evolved into a more classical convent establishment in which women or girls suspected of misconduct would be confined on the orders of the king, judges or even just at their family's request, the most famous example being the courtesan Ninon de l'Enclos, imprisoned there in 1657 at the request of Anne of Austria, now queen-mother (though according to Gédéon Tallemant des Réaux, Ninon did not remain there long, so strong was the pressure of her gallants that gathered around the convent to demand her release). A number of them came from rich families who provided the convent with a large pension. It was thus necessary therefore to strengthen the supervision, which was confided in turn to four sisters of the Visitation of Saint-Antoine (1629–1677), the Ursulines (1677–1720) and finally to the nuns of Saint-Michel (1720 onwards), renowned for their severity.

The convent at its peak housed 165 pensionnaires, organized in three orders, each with a separate building:

- the actual sisters of Sainte Madeleine, after taking their solemn vows, white habit;
- the sisters of Saint' Marthe, after taking their basic vows, grey habit - these could move up to the order of Sainte Madeleine after two years in the novitiate;
- the sisters of Saint Lazare, who had taken no vows and were generally held here against their will, in secular dress but with their face concealed by a black taffeta veil.

== Prison ==
=== French Revolution ===
After the decree of the National Assembly of 13 February 1790 abolishing convents, a last inventory of the convent's goods and income was carried out on 17 March that same year. Though the convent officially closed in 1790, the nuns were only dispersed by stages, since a new mother-superior and bursar were named on 21 March 1791.

In the face of a new wave of imprisonments, in 1793 the convent buildings were converted into a prison for political prisoners and common criminals, with its first prisoners arriving on 4 April under the direction of the commissaire Marino and the concierge Vaubertrand. The tempo of arrests quickened from May 1793 (up to 47 a day) and this led to overcrowding, with a prison only originally meant for 200 people housing up to 319 by 27 Messidor, crammed into cells only 5-square-foot (0.46 m^{2}) each. Common criminals, nicknamed "les pailleux", were held on the ground floor, with people of varying origins referred to as "suspects". Despite the crowded conditions, the mood was good, with improvised poems, singing, music-making and gymnastics, all under the jailors' eyes, but despite this, the prison regime was hard and insanitary. Commissaire Marino forbade prisoners to go into the courtyard, under the pretext that their detention was only provisional whilst they were awaiting transfer to another location. Promiscuity favoured the spread of infectious diseases such as smallpox, which claimed several victims.

At the end of December 1793, the political prisoners were moved to (among others) the Port-Libre, Picpus, and Saint-Lazare prisons, and the common criminals were sent to Bicêtre. Little by little the Madelonnettes was emptied of prisoners after the events of Thermidor, and it reopened in 1795 as a women's prison for female criminals and debtors and young women shut up for correction by their fathers (as an annex to the prison Saint Lazare). An image of the prison can be seen in a painting by Louis Léopold Boilly now at the Musée Carnavalet.

=== 19th century ===
The prison remained a women's prison until April 1831, and also had the population of other prisons transferred to it, such as the public daughters of the Petite Force (1828) and the prisoners at the Prison Sainte-Pélagie (1831). Finally all the prisoners from La Roquette Prisons were transferred to the Madelonnettes in 1836 and it became a maison d'arrêt for men on their way to La Force. In the wake of the 1848 Revolution large numbers of politicians were imprisoned here, and in 1865-1866 the Madelonnettes was finally demolished by Haussmann to build the rue de Turbigo (in works which were photographed by Charles Marville) and replaced by the still existing Prison de la Santé.

=== Famous prisoners ===
Among the "suspects" held here were :

- 13 actors (the actresses were imprisoned at Sainte Pélagie) of the Théâtre Français who remained faithful to the monarchy, arrested on the night of 2 September 1793 following the production of "Pamela", a play by Nicolas-Louis François de Neufchâteau which was judged to be seditious. These included :
  - Fleury
  - Dazincourt
  - François-René Molé
  - Charlotte Vanhove
  - Saint-Prix
  - Saint-Fal
- ancien régime administrators:
  - Louis Thiroux de Crosne (the last lieutenant of police),
  - Anne Gabriel de Boulainvilliers; the last provost of Paris,
  - Jean-Frédéric de la Tour du Pin-Gouvernet, ministre de la Guerre in 1789–1790,
  - abbé Jean-Jacques Barthélemy, of the Académie française,
  - Etienne-Xavier Poisson de la Chabeaussière, former director of the Opéra de Paris,
  - general Arthur Dillon,
  - general René Joseph de Lanoue,
  - Jean-Baptiste de Machault d'Arnouville (former minister, who died at the age of 93),
  - Charles-Pierre Claret de Fleurieu (former ministre de la marine),
  - Angrand d’Alleray, civil lieutenant to the Grand Châtelet, guillotined at the age of 78
  - Sabran, colonel de cavalerie
  - Lecoulteux de Canteleu, former Député to the Estates General
  - Saint-Priest brother of the former interior minister of 1789
- revolutionaries such as Jean-François Varlet
- the Marquis de Sade
- playwright Madame Ulrich and her daughter Thérèse
- the poet Sébastien-Roch Nicolas de Chamfort: imprisoned, then freed, he was re-arrested and re-imprisoned, attempted suicide, and died of his wounds
- Nicolas Appert in 1794

=== In fiction ===
The prison has been mentioned or used as a setting in several works of fiction, including :

- Scènes de la vie d'une courtisane, by Honoré de Balzac
- Le chevalier de Maison Rouge, by Alexandre Dumas
- Les Misérables, by Victor Hugo
- L'enfant léopard, by Daniel Picouly (Prix Renaudot 1999)

== Sources ==
- Botteghe oscure. De Luca Editore. 1958.
- Cohen, Edgar H. (1970). Mademoiselle Libertine A Portrait of Ninon De Lanclos.
- de Chateaubriand, François-René vicomte (1902). The Memoirs of François René, Vicomte de Chateaubriand, Sometime Ambassador to England: Being a Translation by Alexander Teixeira de Mattos of the Mémoires D'outre-tombe, with Illustrations from Contemporary Sources. Freemantle and Company.
- Gear, Norman (1963). The Divine Demon: A Portrait of the Marquis de Sade. F. Muller.
- "Abbayes, monastères, couvents de femmes à Paris, des origines à la fin du XVIIIe siècle" - Paul Biver - PUF (1975)
- "Historiettes" - Gédéon Tallemant des Réaux
- Archives Nationales - S4738
- "Collection des mémoires relatifs à la révolution française" - Tome second - Saint-Albin Berville - Baudouin Frères, libraires éditeurs (Paris - 1823)
- "Histoire physique, civile et morale de Paris" - Jacques-Antoine Dulaure and Jules-Léonard Belin - (1842)
- "Les prisons de l'Europe" - Auguste Maquet and Jules-Edouard Alboise du Pujol (1845)
- "Les prisons de Paris" - Maurice Alhoy and Louis Lurine - Ed Gustave Havard (Paris - 1846)
- "Revue de l'Anjou et du Maine" - tome sixième - Librairie de Cosnier et Lachèse (Angers - 1860)
- "La Prostitution et la police des mœurs au XVIIIe siècle" - Erica-Marie Benabou - Perrin (1987)
- "La pendaison, la strangulation, la suffocation, la submersion" - Paul Brouardel. Paris, Librairie J.B. Baillière et fils, (1897)
- "Enfants corrigés, enfants protégés - Genèse de la protection de l'enfance en Belgique, en France et aux Pays-bas (1820-1914)" - Marie-Sylvie Dupont-Bouchat - Revue du Réseau Européen Droit et Société
- Photos de la démolition : "Le nouveau Paris sens dessus dessous (Marville - Photographies 1864-1877)" Ph. Mellot - Ed. Michèle Trinckvel (1995) - p. 210-213
