= Saint-Fal =

French stage actor

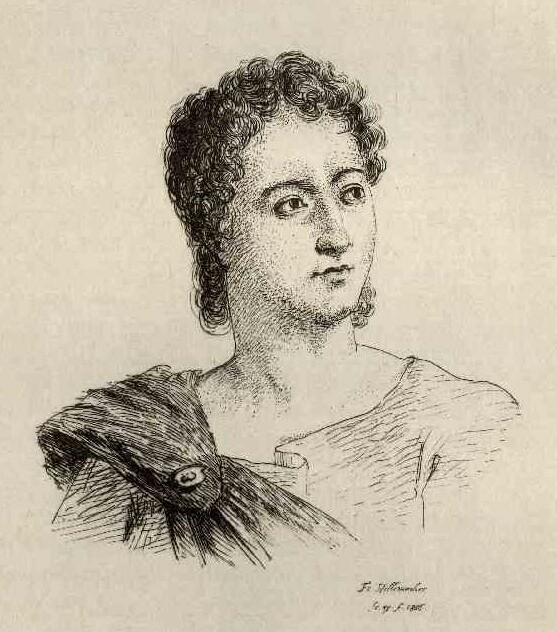
- Born: Étienne Meynier; 10 June 1752; Paris, France
- Died: 22 November 1835 (aged 83); Paris, France
- Burial place: Père Lachaise cemetery
- Other names: Saint Phal
- Occupation: stage actor
- Relatives: Charles Meynier (brother)

Saint-Fal, real name Étienne Meynier (or Saint Phal) (10 June 1752 – 22 November 1835) was a French stage actor.

== Biography ==
Étienne Meynier was born in Paris, France on 10 June 1752.

After he participated in an amateur troupe, he integrated that of Mademoiselle Montansier at Versailles, then moved to The Hague where he stayed three years.

He performed in Lyon in 1781, then at the Théâtre de la Monnaie in Brussels.

On 8 July 1782, Saint-Fal made his debut at the Comédie-Française in Gaston et Bayard by Belloy. Received as a test on 17 March 1783, he was definitely admitted on 25 March of the following year.

At the time of the French Revolution, Saint-Fal was denounced by La Bussière and thrown into jail.

On his release, he joined Mlle Raucourt at the Théâtre Louvois and then gave the exact measure of his talent. On the night of 2 September 1793, he was arrested again, along with 12 other comedians in the Théâtre Français remained loyal to the monarchy, as "suspects" and imprisoned in the Madelonnettes Convent, for playing a theatrical performance judged seditious: Pamela.

At the fusion of the two troupes of French actors, he took over from his model, actor Molé, and became dean of the Comédie-Française. He retired in 1824, eleven years before he died. He died in Paris, France on 22 November 1835 and is buried in the 19th division of the Père Lachaise cemetery.

His brother Charles Meynier (1768–1832) was a renowned painter.

== See also ==
- Troupe of the Comédie-Française in 1790
