= Madame Ulrich =

French playwright and writer (born c. 1665 – died after 1707)

- Born: About 1665
- Died: After 1707
- Occupations: Playwright, writer
- Known for: La Folle Enchère (The Mad Bid)

Madame Ulrich (born c. 1665, died after 1707) was a French playwright and writer. Along with Catherine Bernard and Charlotte Legrand, she was one of only three female authors to have had a play performed at the Comédie-Française theater in Paris during the 17th century.

== Biography ==
Madame Ulrich was the daughter of one of King Louis XIV's Vingt-Quatre Violons (a five-part string ensemble at the French royal court). Her father died when she was thirteen or fourteen, and she was apprenticed to a barber. Mr. Ulrich, a butler to the Count of Auvergne, met her and decided to place her in a convent with a view to marrying her, despite their great age difference. She became a friend of the Duchesse de Choiseul-Praslin, had lovers such as the comedian Florent Dancourt, Jean de La Fontaine and the Marquis de Sablé, and frequented the circle of the Duc de Bouillon.

=== Early life ===
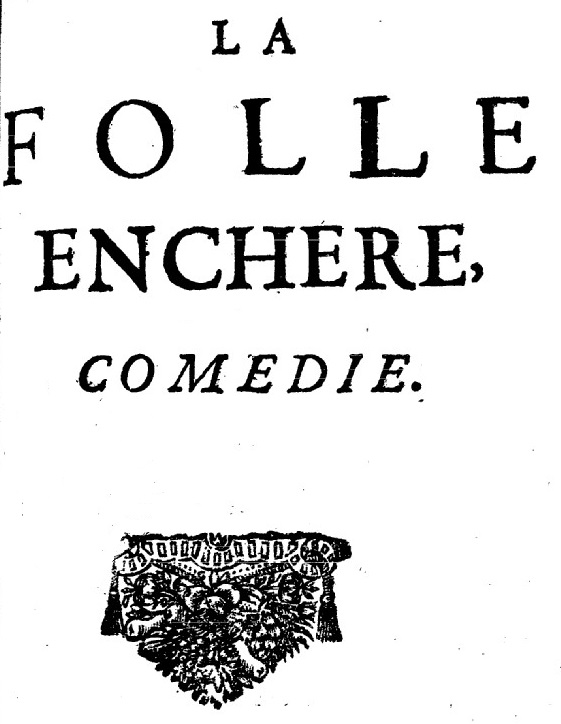
Title page of the Ulrich comedy, "The Mad Bid". 1691

In 1690, she wrote and published a transvestite comedy, La Folle Enchère, which premiered on 30 May 1690 at the Comédie-Française and was performed before the King at the Palace of Versailles. The play was long attributed to her lover Florent Dancourt before that was changed to Ulrich, although some sources continue to name Dancourt as the author. The feminine agreement of the preface, the analysis of the privilege and the style of the play all attest to Madame Ulrich's authorship. According to André Blanc, "the careful composition, the considerable role of disguises and their final resolution, a certain confusion at times, a romantic intention, the very attack of the comedy, very brilliant, hardly resembles Dancourt's manner of this period."

Following the death of her friend Jean de La Fontaine, Madame Ulrich published Posthumous Works in 1696, for which she wrote a preface and a dedication to the Marquis de Sablé, as well as a portrait of the poet, and included unpublished works (including the Tale of the Quiproquos, new versions of certain fables, of which she owned the manuscripts, verses and two letters written to her by La Fontaine).

=== Repression ===
From 1699 onwards, Madame Ulrich's freedom of morals displeased the authorities. The pleasures and amusements of King Louis XIV's early reign had given way to austerity and devotion. Control over society and transgressive behavior intensified. After the repression of prostitution, courtesans who had fled the puritanism of the Court for the pleasures of Paris and its libertine salons were put under surveillance. To discipline these rebellious wives and daughters who had freed themselves from marital or paternal guardianship, they were locked up at the Madelonnettes Convent. At the request of Louis XIV and Madame de Maintenon, Madame Ulrich's actions were monitored by police lieutenant-general René d'Argenson. Initially sent with her daughter Thérèse to a convent to repent, she was then regularly arrested and confined at Les Madelonnettes, from which she escaped, at Le Refuge, and then at Hôpital Général. After 1707, no further trace of her can be found. According to her biographer Aurore Évain, "she seems to have spent the last years of her life being maintained, gradually sinking into prostitution".

Far from the "debauched courtesan, unworthy mother and venal muse" to which history has long reduced her, Aurore Évain concludes that "the few biographical and literary elements we have today enable us to re-establish the portrait of a free, cultivated woman, a promising writer [...], but whose auctorial recognition and literary creation were violently thwarted by the social and moral conditions imposed on women".

== Stagings ==
- La Folle Enchère, Comédie-Française, from 30 May to 16 June 1690, resumed on 14 and 16 January 1691, and on 14 November 1691 at the Versailles Court.
- La Folle Enchère, Cie La Subversive, directed by Aurore Évain, 14–16 November 2019, Ferme de Bel Ébat - Théâtre de Guyancourt; 28 Nov.-8 December 2019, resumed 21–31 October 2021, Théâtre de l'Épée de Bois - Cartoucherie de Vincennes.
