= Francois Antoine Romany =

French painter

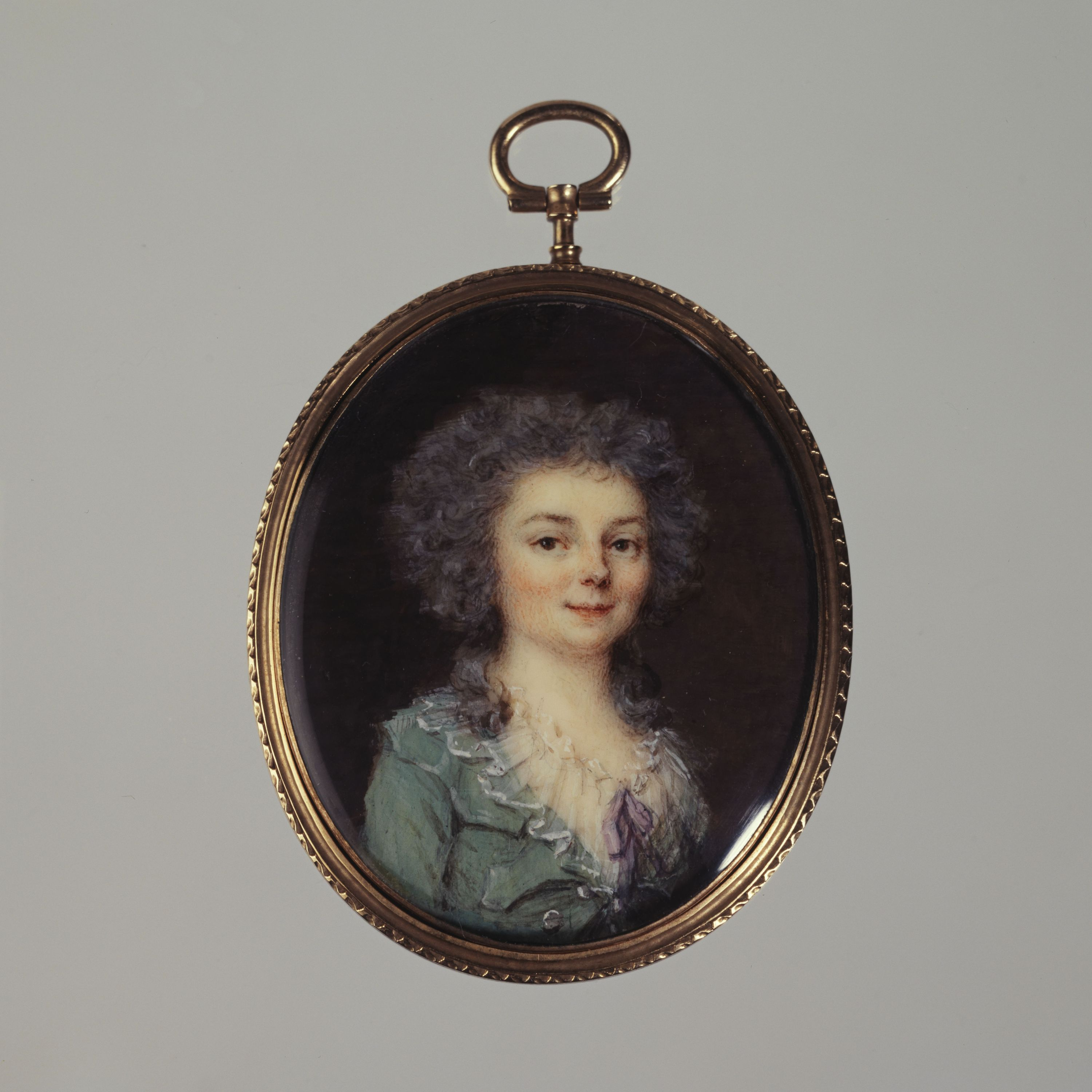
Miniature portrait of a young girl by François-Antoine Romany

Francois Antoine Romany (Lyon, 1756 - Paris 1839) was a French miniature painter.

== Biography ==
Francois Antoine Romany was born in Lyon on 29 February 1756, as a son of merchant Jean Romany and Antoinette Magnin, and died in Paris in 1839. In 1787 Romany became friend of the Swedish painter Adolf Ulrik Wertmüller (1751 – 1811) who introduced him to Alexandre Roslin (1718 – 1793) and Peter Adolf Hall (1739 – 1793), when Romany went in Paris in 1788 where he lived in rue de Provence. Hall, even if had no pupils, gave him some advice. In fact miniatures of Romany, painted in the 18th century, show a visible influence of Hall and were, in the past, ascribed to Hall. In 1788 Romany had a daughter, Aglaé-Emée Romany, from his future wife Marie-Jeanne, called Adele Romany (Jeanne-Marie Mercier) (1769 – 1846), legitimate daughter of the Marquis de Romance, artist to whom, in the past, the great part of his artistic production was attributed by mistake. In 1788 the couple had a son Aglaé-Emée Romany, after two years they were married and in 1791 they divorced. In 1792 Romany went to work in Lyon and later, in 1796, he married Marie Elisabeth de Roye née Valfray, widow of Count de Roye with two children. Romany wrote many letters to his friend Wertmüller in which covers various topics. He expresses his wonder for the collapse of the French Monarchy and his doubts about the political future of the Nation considered unstable and uncertain. Talkes about his meeting with Adele de Romance thanks to Lady de Royer and describes her as a “petite”, pretty, intelligent woman with a substantial dowry. And talks about his artistic production in which he alternated periods of financial crisis and labor shortages in periods of greater satisfaction. He describes his new wife as his inseparable soul mate with whom he lived for over thirty years. In fact she died in 1834 and Romany after five years in 1839. The couple was buried in Montparnasse Cemetery. On their tombs is written “ils furent et seront inseparables”

== Artwork ==
Romany’s miniatures are comparable to those of other miniaturists of the period. Romany did not exhibit at the Paris Salon. In the first part of his career, his style involved a free painting technique and the use of colors for fabrics. His brushstroke technique was used for the faces of sitters. In the second part of his career, his brushstroke became more detailed. His portraits from this period are similar to the neoclassical style.

== Works ==
- “Portrait of a lady with two children”, watercolor on ivory, Accorsi - Ometto Museum Turin (Italy)
- “Portrait of a lady with a yellow scarf” watercolor on ivory, Louvre
- “Portrait of a young lady” watercolor on ivory, Musée Cognacq-Jay
- “Box with a portrait of a lady and hairwork”, watercolor on ivory, Musée Cognacq-Jay
- "Portrait of a young lady with pearl diadem", watercolor on ivory.
- "Portrait of two sisters", watercolor on ivory, ca. 1795
- "Lady in White Dress with Blue Shawl", watercolour and gouache on ivory, c. 1792, The Tansey Miniatures Foundation
- "Portrait of Marie de Bourguenoud", watercolour and gouache on ivory, c. 1790, The Tansey Miniatures Foundation
