= Madame Thénard =

French actress

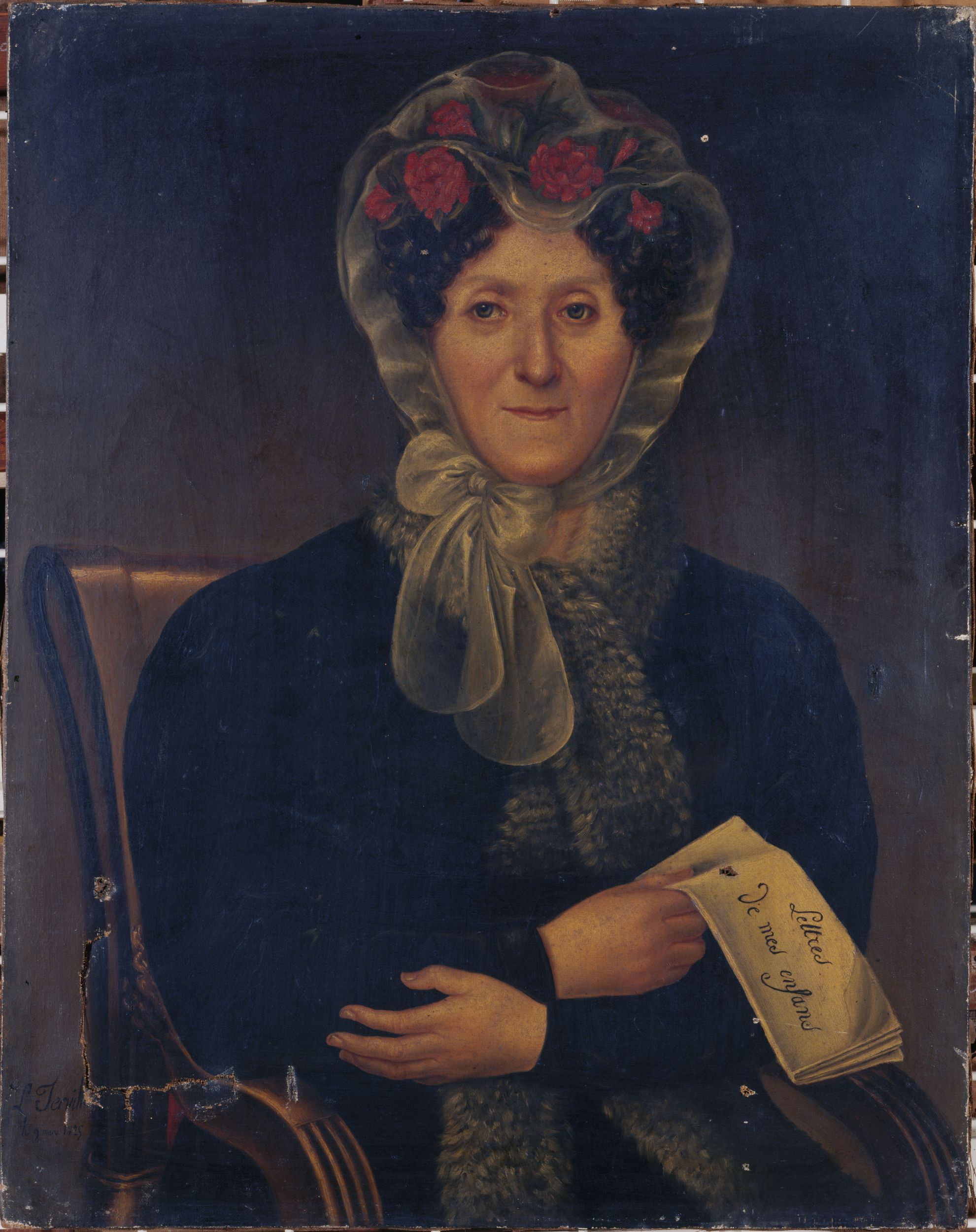
- Portrait of Madame Thénard by Louis-Basile de Veaucorbeille
- Born: Marie-Magdeleine-Claudine Chevalier-Perrin; 1767
- Died: 1849 (aged 81–82)
- Occupation: Actress

Marie-Magdeleine-Claudine Chevalier-Perrin (1767–1849), stage name Madame Thénard, was a French stage actress.

Perrin was a singer for the Opéra Comique of Marseille, where she was discovered by the actor Préville. She then joined the Comédie Française in 1781 at the age of 24. She was imprisoned during the French Reign of Terror, but was not executed due to a pregnancy. After the Thermidorian Reaction, she was freed. She later traveled to Germany as an actress in Napoleon's Comédiens de l'Empereur.

In 1837, she donated a portrait Adèle Romany had painted of her in the role of Hermione from Andromaque to the Comédie Française.
