= Grandmesnil (actor) =

French actor and playwright

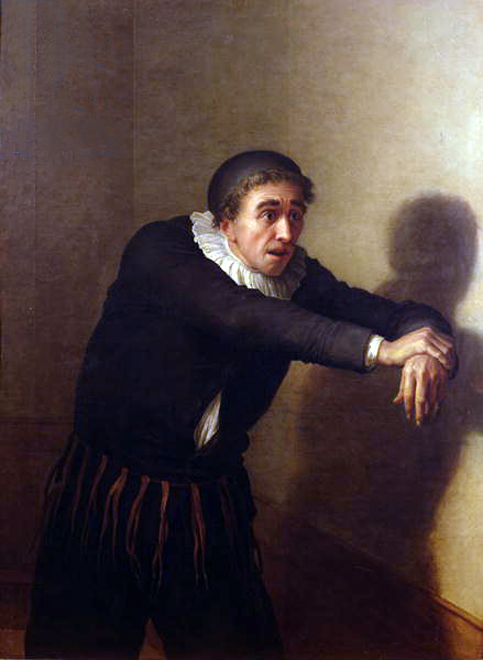
Grandmesnil in the role of Harpagon, by Jean-Baptiste François Desoria

Jean-Baptiste Fauchard (19 March 1737, Paris – 24 May 1816, Paris), stage name Grandmesnil or Grand-Ménil), was a French actor and playwright.

== Life ==
At first a lawyer in the parliament of Paris, then a counsellor in the Admiralty, he spoke out against the Parlement Maupeou and left France in 1771. Taking refuge in Brussels, he gave himself over the theatrical interests he had always had and appeared in several servant roles. Returning to France some years later, he acted in Marseille and then in Bordeaux, where he played financiers and "rôles à manteau".

On 31 August 1790, he made his début at the Comédie-Française (becoming a societaire of it in 1792), from which he retired on 21 March 1811. Grandmesnil was noted as one of the best interpreters of Molière and particularly excelled in the rôles of Arnolphe and Harpagon. The distinction of his manners and the constant regularity of his lifestyle were highly valued and in 1796 he was summoned to the Académie des Beaux-Arts de l'Institut de France on its formation, in the Literature and Fine Arts classe.

== Works ==
Grandmesnil wrote two plays, although they may have never been performed in his lifetime.

- Le Savetier joyeux (1759)
- Tant pis pour elles, tant pis pour eux et tant mieux pour eux, tant mieux pour elles, ou le Voyage impromptu (1760)

== Sources ==
- Gustave Vapereau, Dictionnaire universel des littératures, Paris, Hachette, 1876, p. 923

== See also ==
- Troupe of the Comédie-Française in 1790
