= Adèle Romany =

French painter

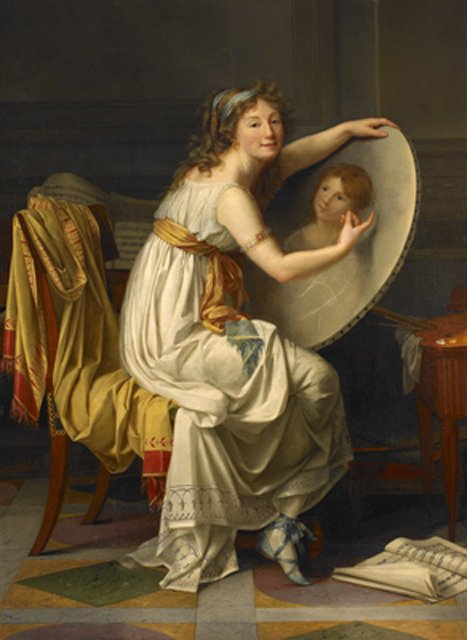
- Presumed self-portrait c. 1799
- Born: Jeanne Marie Mercier; 7 December 1769
- Died: 6 June 1846 (aged 76); Paris, France
- Other names: Adèle Romanée; Adèle de Romance
- Known for: Painting

Adèle Romany, a.k.a Adèle de Romance or Adèle Romanée (7 December 1769 – 6 June 1846) was a French miniature portrait painter.

== Biography ==
Adèle de Romance, born Jeanne Marie Mercier in Paris in 1769, was the illegitimate child of Jeanne-Marie Bernardine Mercier. On March 18, 1778, when she was 8 years old, she was recognized and legitimized by her father, Godefroy V, Marquis de Romance, brother of the writer and soldier Germain-Hyacinthe de Romance. From this point she used the name Adèle de Romance.

Romany was a pupil of Jean-Baptiste Regnault and is known for miniatures and portraits, especially those of people involved in performing arts. In 1790, she married the miniature painter François Antoine Romany (they later divorced). Over the course of forty years, she exhibited 80 of her works in the Paris Salon. When she exhibited, she used several variations of her maiden and married names, including Romance, Romany, Romanée, Romany de Romance, and de Romance Romany. In 1808, she won a gold medal of the jury. Among her most admired works are her self-portrait with her children (1800), the portrait of Mlle A. P., exhibited at the Salon of 1806, and the portraits of the actresses Mlle Raucourt (Salons of 1812 and 1814) and Mlle Emilie Leverd (Salons of 1808 and 1814). Her many portraits of actors, actresses, and musicians, is the reason that the largest collection of her works is at the Comédie-Française.

She had three children, and died in Paris, aged 76. Alongside her artistic activities, Adèle de Romance engaged in various financial speculations during the Revolution, the Directory, and the Consulate. She purchased a house and used the mortgage as collateral for loans; she apparently used these funds to finance other ventures. At her death on June 7, 1846, in Paris, her assets totaled over 8,000 francs. She is buried in the Père Lachaise Cemetery (14th division).

Adèle de Romance received little critical attention after her death before her recent rediscovery. A retrospective exhibition is dedicated to the work of Adèle de Romance at the Jean-Honoré-Fragonard Museum in Grasse, organized by curator Carole Blumenfeld, from June 14 to October 12, 2025.

== Gallery ==
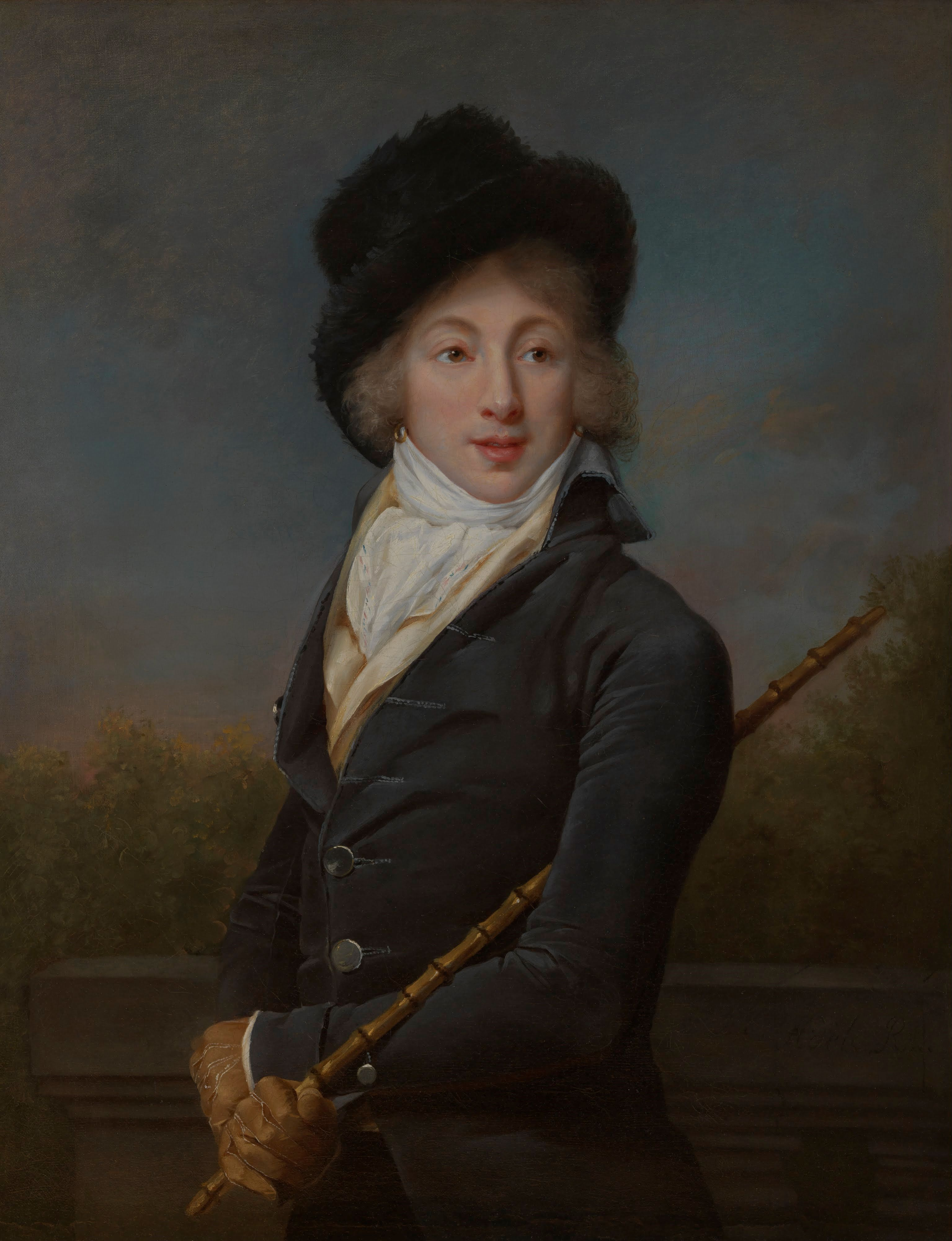
Portrait of Auguste Vestris

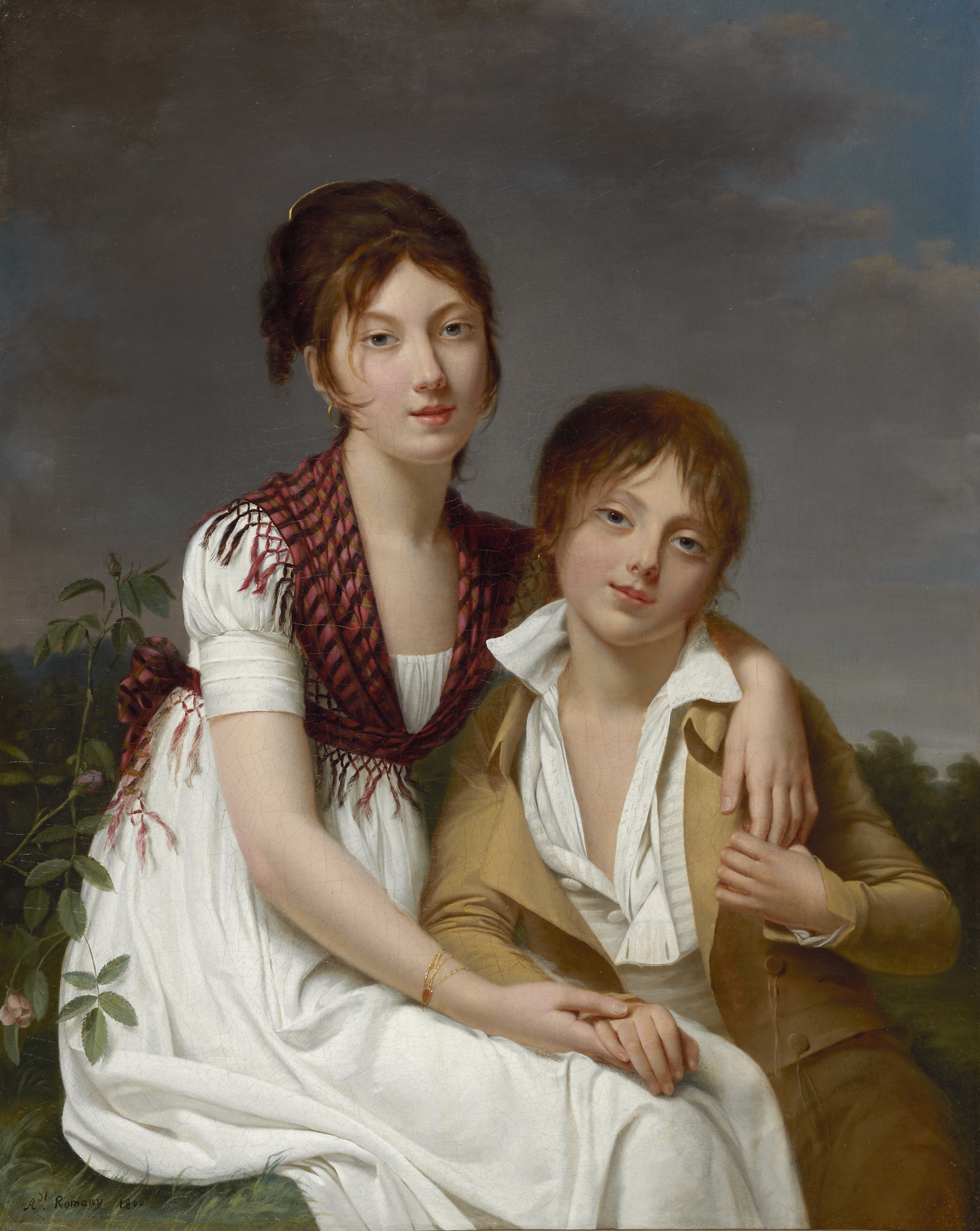
Portrait of Amélie-Justine and Charles-Édouard Pontois, 1800

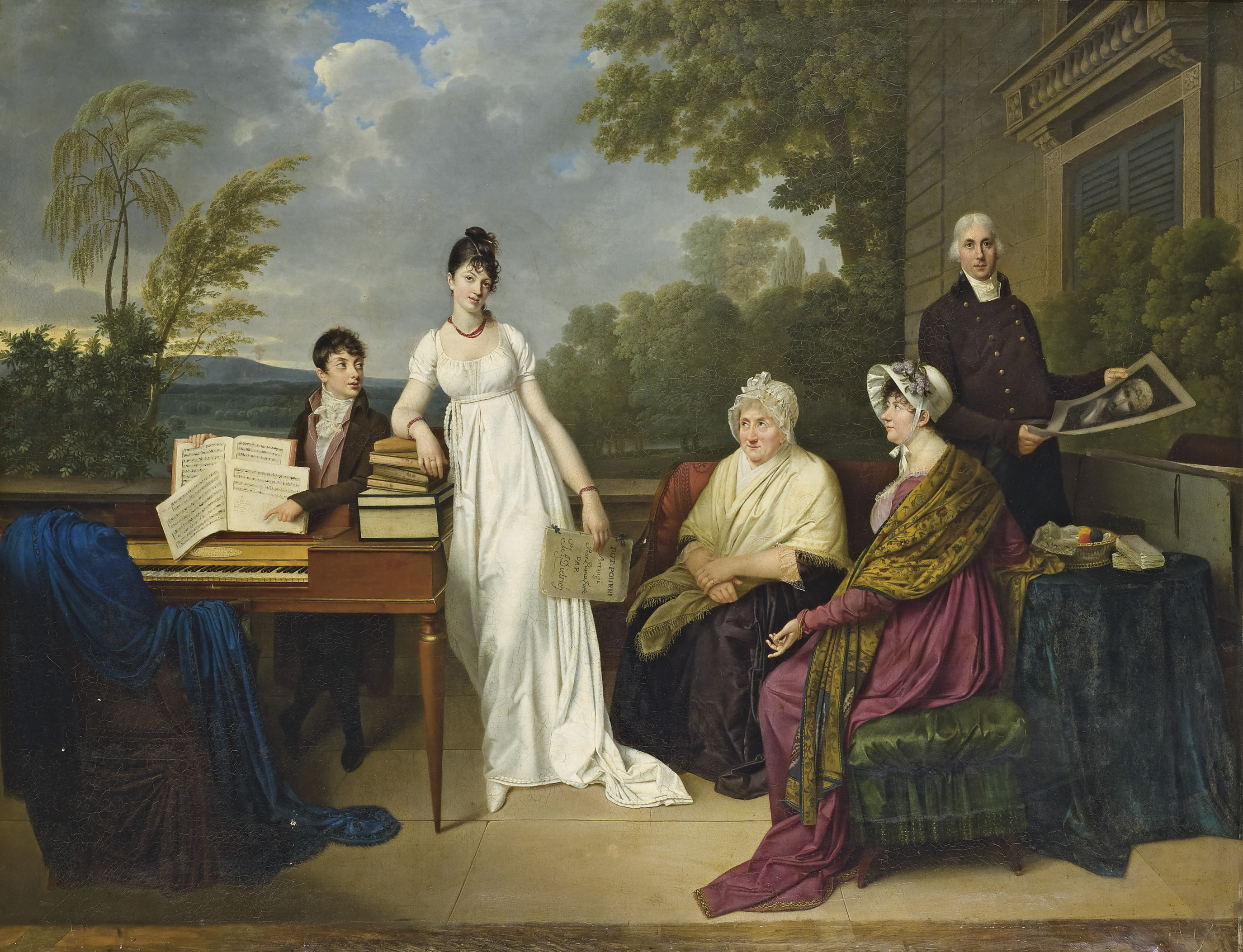
A young person hesitating to play the piano in front of her family, also known as Portrait of the Artist's Family in Front of the Chateau de Juily, Ile-de-France

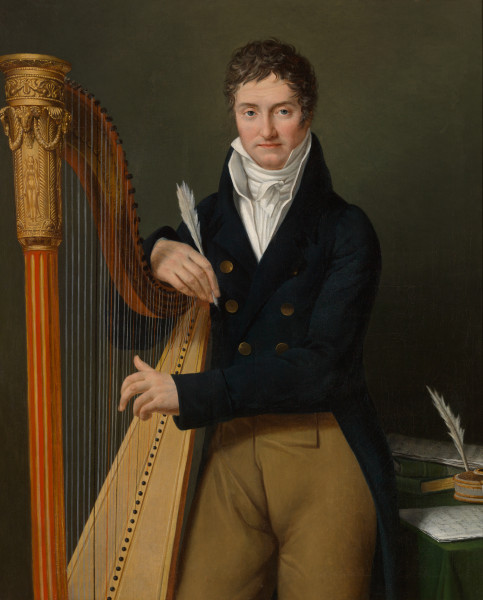
Portrait of Michael Kelly
