= Dazincourt =

French actor

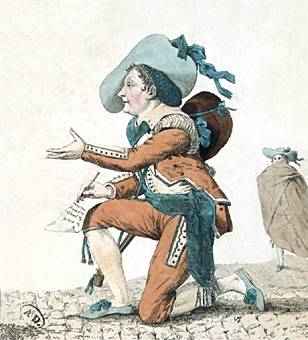
- Dazincourt in The Barber of Seville (1785)
- Born: Joseph-Jean-Baptiste Albouy; 11 December 1747; Marseille
- Died: 28 March 1809 (aged 61); Paris
- Occupation: Actor

Joseph-Jean-Baptiste Albouy (11 December 1747 in Marseille – 28 March 1809 in Paris), stage name Dazincourt, was a French actor.

== Life ==
Educated by the Oratorians, Dazincourt entered the service of the maréchal de Richelieu in 1766 and had a taste of acting in comedies of manners. Deciding to make this his profession, he left Paris in secret for Brussels to study under D'Hannetaire, then at the peak of his reputation.

After acting at the Théâtre de la Monnaie from 1771 to 1776, Dazincourt returned to Paris and made his debut at the Comédie-Française on 21 November 1776 in the rôle of Crispin in Les Folies amoureuses by Jean-François Regnard. He became a sociétaire of this theatre in 1778 and remained one until his death.

In December 1776 the Mercure de France commented on his debuts: "This actor has a well-formed talent, a reasoned manner, and much intelligence, finesse and truth-to-life. He is a good comic-actor without being a farceur, and pleasing without being anything more."

During the night of 2 September 1793, he and 12 other actors of the Théâtre Français also felt to have remained faithful to the monarchy were arrested and imprisoned in the prison des Madelonnettes, for putting on the allegedly seditious play "Pamela".

His greatest role was that of Figaro in Le Mariage de Figaro. His memoirs were published by Henri-Alexis Cahaisse in the year of his death.

== See also ==
- Troupe of the Comédie-Française in 1790
