= Sylvia Glickman =

American musician (1932–2006)

Sylvia Foodin Glickman (November 8, 1932 – January 16, 2006) was a pianist, composer, teacher, and prominent promoter of music by women composers.

Glickman was born and grew up in New York City, where her mother enrolled her in music school at the age of 3. She graduated from the High School of Music and Art in 1950 (now the Fiorello H. LaGuardia High School of Music & Art and Performing Arts). She earned a bachelor's degree in 1954 from the Juilliard School of Music, where she also received a master's degree in 1955 in piano performance. She studied at the Royal Academy of Music in London on a Fulbright scholarship.

She married Harvey Glickman, a political science professor, in 1956.

Glickman taught piano at the New England Conservatory of Music, Haverford College, Princeton University, and Franklin and Marshall College.

According to her obituary in The Philadelphia Inquirer, in 1988 she founded Hildegard Press, named for 12th-century composer Hildegard of Bingen, which is now separately owned and still operating.

"Mrs. Glickman was on a mission to unearth female composers who had gone unnoticed in music history. She began churning out catalogs by the hundreds."

"In 1991, she was coeditor with Martha Schleifer of a 12-volume reference, Women Composers: Music through the Ages. She finished the project before her death. Eight volumes have been published by Boston-based Gale Group. The four remaining volumes are still to be published."

She also founded the Hildegard Foundation, a non-profit organization which supports programs and prizes aligned with its mission of supporting women in the arts. The foundation is still operated by Glickman's family.

She died in Bala Cynwyd, Pennsylvania.

== Sources ==
- Anderson, E. Ruth (ed.), "Glickman, Sylvia Foodim", Contemporary American composers: a biographical dictionary (2nd edition), G.K. Hall, 1982, p. 198. ISBN 0-8161-8223-X
- Miksis, Alyssa K. and Rubinsky, Jane, "Giving a Voice to Women Composers ", The Juilliard Journal, Vol. XVIII No. 5, February 2003.
- Morrison, John F., "S. Glickman, honored musical women", The Philadelphia Daily News, January 19, 2006
- Philadelphia Inquirer, "Pianist, composer S. Glickman", January 22, 2006, p. B5
- Press, Jaques Cattell (Ed.). Who's who in American Music. Classical, first edition. R. R. Bowker, New York 1983.
- Smith, Kyle. Catalog of the music of Pennsylvania composers, Vol. I: Orchestral Music. Pennsylvania Composers Forum, 1992.
- Zaimont, Judith Lang. The musical woman. An international perspective, Vol. III: 1986–1990. Greenwood Press, 1990.
