= Mlle Raucourt =

French actress (1756-1815)

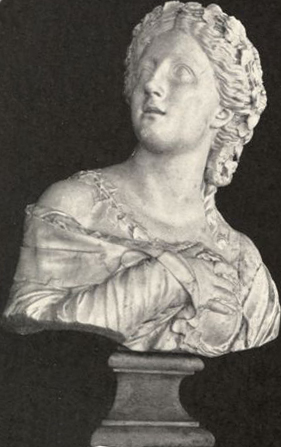
- Mademoiselle Racourt by Augustin Pajou
- Born: Françoise Marie Antoinette Saucerotte; 3 March 1756; Nancy, France
- Died: 15 January 1815 (aged 58); Paris, France
- Years active: 1768-1815

Françoise Marie Antoinette Saucerotte,whose stage name was Mlle Raucourt (3 March 1756 – 15 January 1815) was a French actress, engaged at the Comédie Française in 1772-1799, where she became famous as a tragedienne.

== Life ==
She was born in Nancy as the daughter of an actor, who took her to Spain. There she played in tragedy at the age of twelve. By 1770 she was back in France at Rouen, and her success as Euphmie in Belloy's Gaston et Bayard caused her to be called to the Comédie Française.

=== Career at the Comédie Française ===
In 1772, she made her debut at the Comédie Française as Dido. She played all the classical tragedy parts to crowded houses, until the scandals of her private life and her extravagance ended her popularity.

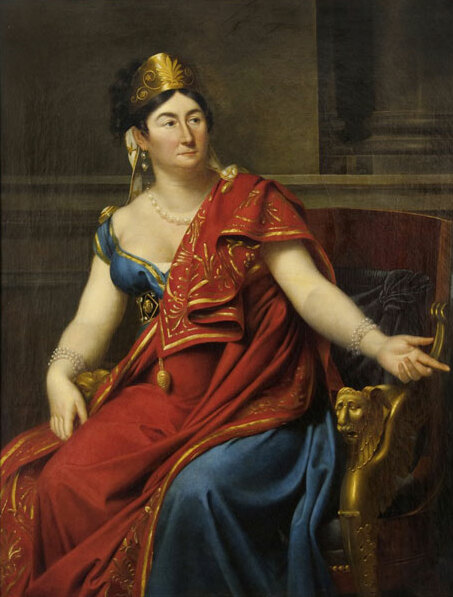
Mlle. Raucourt by Adèle Romany

Her beauty and talent had made her famous, but her not so secret love affairs with other women made her notorious. She was known to have had numerous affairs with both men and women, preferring the latter. One on-again-off-again lover was opera soprano Sophie Arnould. Famous or not, in her time this could have a negative effect on a career, and a popular scandalous pamphlet claimed that she led a secret society of lesbians in Paris called the Sect of Anandrynes, although no such group existed.

Part of the ensuing three years she was in prison for debt, but some of the time she spent in the capitals of northern Europe, followed everywhere by scandal. Under protection of the queen she reappeared at the Théâtre Français in 1779, and renewed her success in Paris, as Cleopatra, and all her former roles.

=== Later career ===
At the outbreak of the Revolution she was imprisoned for six months with other royalist members of the Comédie Française, and she did not reappear upon that stage until the close of 1793, and then only for a short time. In prison she met her last partner, Henriette Simonnot-Ponty, with whom she lived until death. She deserted, with a dozen of the best actors in the company, to found a rival colony, but a summons from the Directory brought her back in 1797.

Napoleon gave her a pension, and in 1806 she was commissioned to organize and direct a company that was to tour Italy, where, especially in Milan, she was enthusiastically received. She returned to Paris a few months before her death on 15 January 1815.

Her funeral was the occasion of a riot. The clergy of her parish having refused to receive the body, the crowd broke in the church doors, and were only restrained from further violence by the arrival of an almoner sent posthaste by Louis XVIII. She is buried at the Père Lachaise Cemetery, in Paris.

== See also ==
- Troupe of the Comédie-Française in 1790
