= Nicolas Chamfort =

French writer

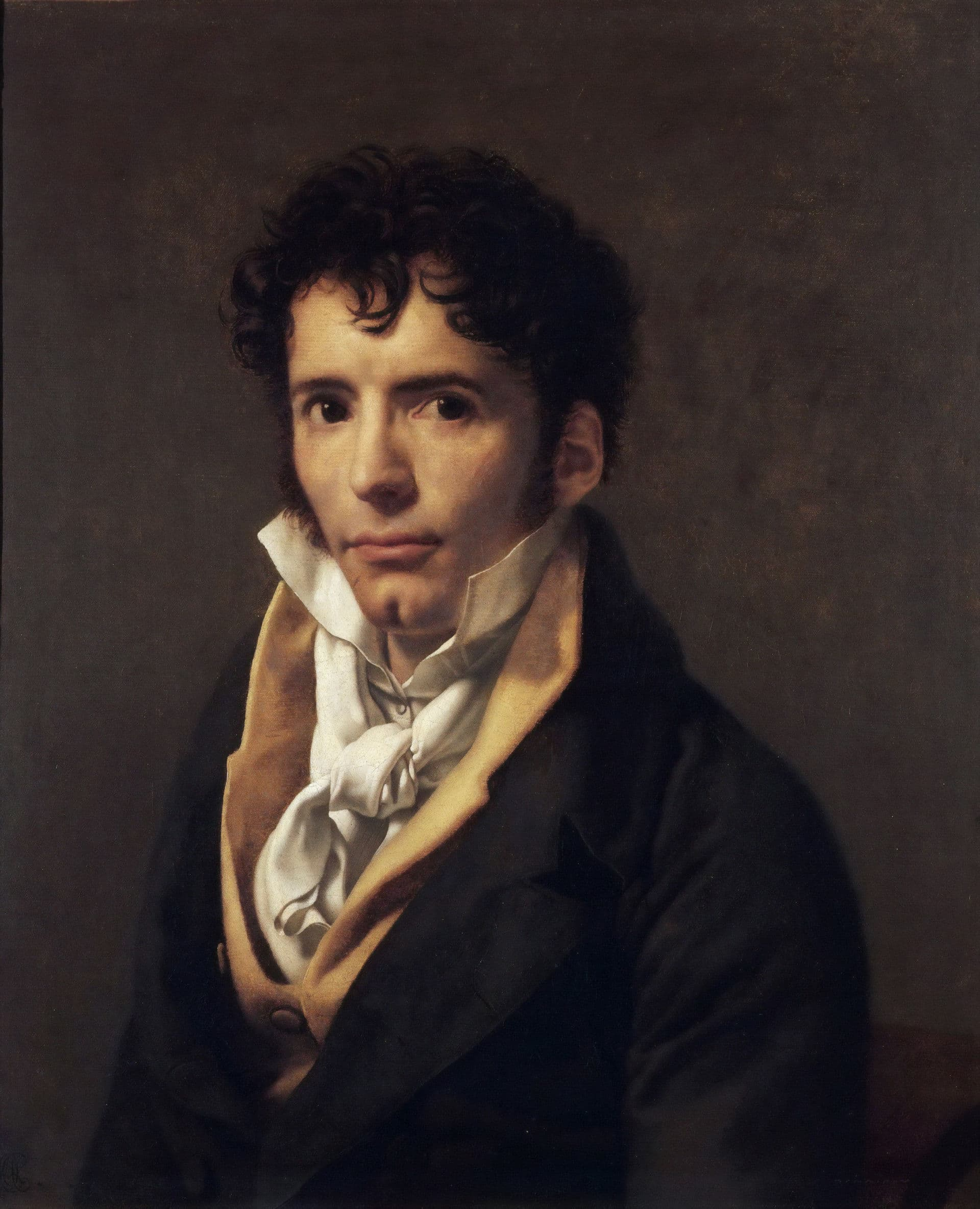
- Born: 6 April 1741; Clermont-Ferrand, France
- Died: 13 April 1794 (aged 53); Paris, France
- Occupations: Playwright, writer
- Known for: Epigrams and aphorisms

Sébastien-Roch Nicolas, known in his adult life as Nicolas Chamfort and as Sébastien Nicolas de Chamfort (French: [ʃɑ̃fɔʁ]; 6 April 1741 – 13 April 1794), was a French writer, best known for his epigrams and aphorisms. He was secretary to Louis XVI's sister Madame Élisabeth, and of the Jacobin club.

== Biography ==
There are two birth certificates for Chamfort. The first, from Saint-Genès parish in Clermont-Ferrand, the capital city of Auvergne, says he was born there on 6 April 1741, the son of a grocer with the surname of Nicolas, and that he was given the name "Sébastien-Roch", so that his full name was Sébastien-Roch Nicolas. But a second birth certificate gives him the name "Sébastien Roch" and says he was born on 22 June, of "unknown parents", and some scholars argue that he was not born but baptized on that day. Local tradition said that he was the love child of an aristocratic woman, Jacqueline de Montrodeix (née Cisternes de Vinzelles), and of a clergyman named Pierre Nicolas; and that he was then given for adoption to the grocer, who was a relative of the biological father.

At the age of nine he was sent to Paris to study as a scholarship student at the Collège des Grassins. He worked hard, although one of his most contemptuous epigrams reads: "What I learned I no longer know; the little I still know, I guessed" ("Ce que j'ai appris je ne le sais plus; le peu que je sais encore, je l'ai deviné.") He was a brilliant though dreamy student. When the principal of the college promised him a stipend, he replied that he could not accept because he preferred honour to honours: "J'aime l'honneur et non-les honneurs".

Upon graduation he assumed the name of Chamfort.

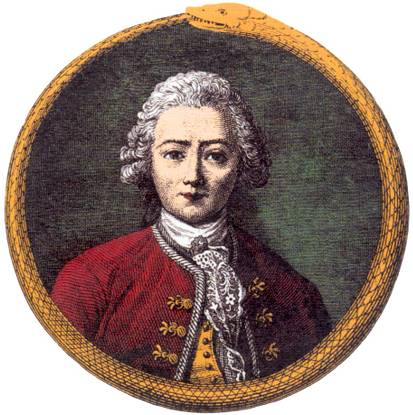
A younger Nicolas Chamfort

For some time he subsisted by teaching and hack writing. His good looks and ready wit brought him attention; but, though endowed with immense physical strength – Madame de Craon called him "Hercules under the guise of Adonis" (Hercule]] sous la figure d'Adonis) – he lived so hard that he was glad to have the opportunity for a rest cure in the town of Spa when the Belgian minister in Paris, M. van Eyck, invited him to accompany him to Germany in 1761. On his return to Paris, Chamfort produced a successful comedy, The Young Indian Girl (La Jeune Indienne, 1764), following it with a series of epistles in verse, essays and odes. However, his literary reputation was not established until 1769, when the Académie française awarded him a prize for his Eloge on Molière.

Until then, he lived from hand to mouth, mainly on the hospitality of people who gave him board and lodging in exchange for the pleasure of the conversation for which he was famous. Madame Helvétius entertained him at Sèvres for some years. In 1770, another comedy, Le Marchand de Smyrne, brought him further notice, and he seemed on the road to fame and fortune, when illness struck. A generous friend gave him a pension of 1200 livres, charged on the Mercure de France. Thus assisted, he was able to go to the baths of Contrexéville and to spend some time in the country, where he wrote an Eloge on La Fontaine which won the prize of the Academy of Marseilles in 1774.

In 1775, while taking the waters at Barges, he met the duchesse de Grammont, sister of Choiseul, through whose influence he was introduced at court. In 1776, his tragedy, Mustapha et Zeangir, was played at Fontainebleau before Louis XVI and Marie Antoinette. Subsequently, the king gave him a further pension of 1200 livres and his cousin, the Prince de Condé, made him his secretary. Disliking the constraints of court life, he became increasingly discontented, and after a year he resigned his post in the prince's household and retired to Auteuil. There, comparing the authors of old with his contemporaries, he composed a famous mot that proclaims the superiority of the dead over the living as companions. He fell in love with and married a lady attached to the household of the duchesse du Maine; she was 48 years old, clever, amusing, and a woman of the world. They soon moved to Vaucouleurs, where she died within six months. Chamfort lived in Holland for a time with M. de Narbonne, then returned to Paris where he was elected in 1781 to the Académie française.

He was a member of the Masonic lodge Les Neuf Sœurs.

In 1784, through the influence of Calonne, he became secretary to the king's sister, Madame Élisabeth, and in 1786 he received a pension of 2000 livres from the royal treasury. He was thus once more attached to the court, and made friends there despite his satirical attitude. He quit the court for good after an unfortunate and mysterious love affair, and was taken into the house of M. de Vaudreuil. Here, in 1783, he met Honoré Mirabeau, with whom he remained steadfast friends, whom he assisted with money and influence, and at least one of whose speeches he wrote.

The outbreak of the French Revolution profoundly changed Chamfort's life. He threw himself into the republican movement, forgetting his old friends at court and devoting his small fortune to revolutionary propaganda. He became a street orator and was among the first to enter the Bastille when it was stormed. Until 3 August 1791 he was secretary of the Jacobin club. He worked for the Mercure de France, collaborated with Pierre-Louis Ginguené in the Feuille villageoise, and drew up for Talleyrand his Addresse au peuple français.

With the reign of Marat and Robespierre, he became critical of uncompromising Jacobinism, and with the fall of the Girondins his political life came to an end. But he could not restrain the tongue that had made him famous; he no more spared the Convention than he had spared the court. His notorious republicanism failed to excuse the sarcasms he lavished on the new order of things. Fingered by an assistant in the Bibliothèque Nationale, to a share in the direction of which he had been appointed by Jean Marie Roland, he was taken to the prison des Madelonnettes. Soon after his release, he was threatened again with arrest, but he decided that death was preferable to a repetition of the moral and physical restraint to which he had been subjected.

== Suicide attempt ==
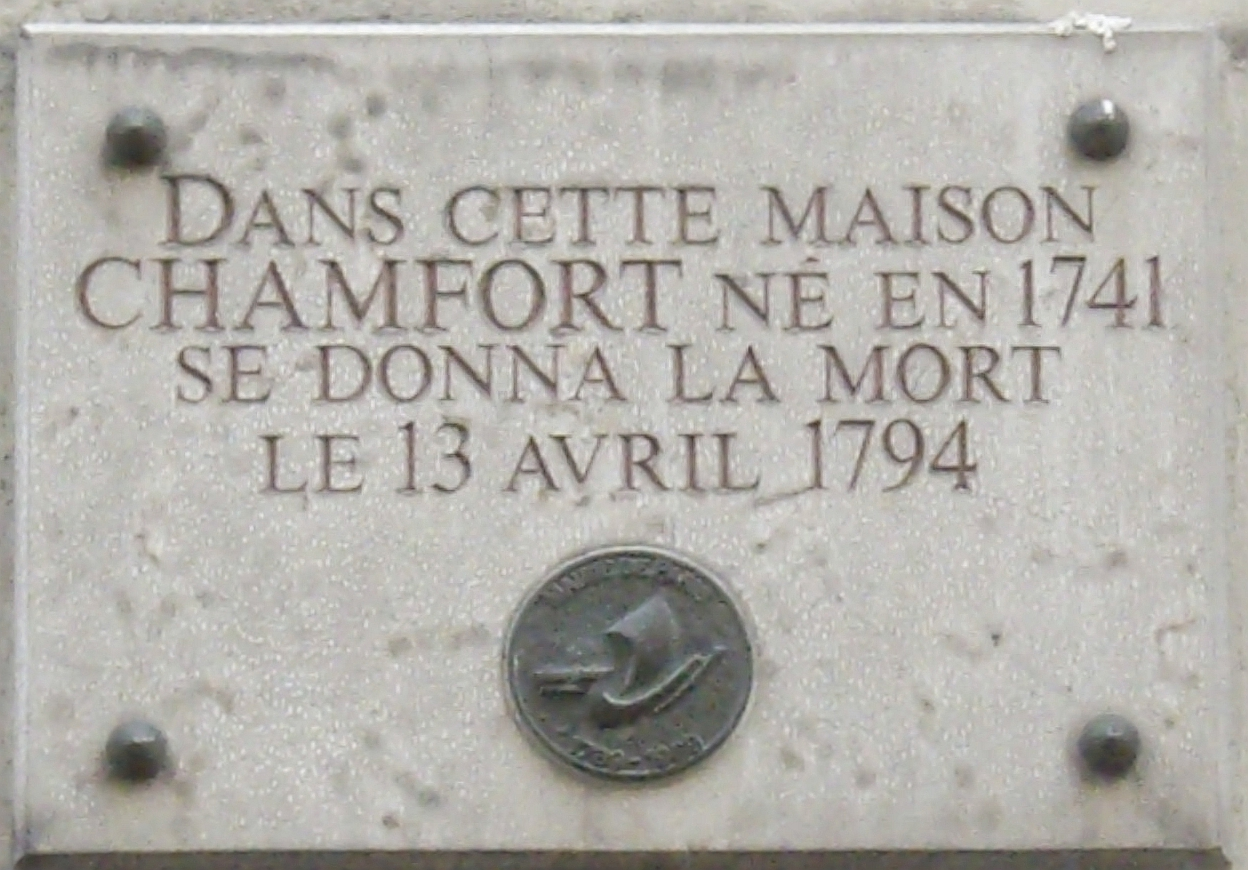
Memorial plaque at 10, rue Chabanais, Paris 2ième

Unable to tolerate the prospect of being imprisoned once more, in September 1793 he locked himself into his office and shot himself in the face. The pistol malfunctioned and he did not die even though he shot off his nose and his right eye. He then repeatedly stabbed his neck with a razor, but failed to cut an artery. He finally used the razor to stab himself in the chest and to cut his ankle joints, aiming at the veins. He dictated to those who came to arrest him the well-known declaration Moi, Sebastien-Roch Nicolas de Chamfort, déclare avoir voulu mourir en homme libre plutôt que d'être reconduit en esclave dans une maison d'arrêt ("I, Sebastien-Roch Nicolas de Chamfort, hereby declare my wish to die a free man rather than to be brought (again) as a slave in a prison") which he signed in a firm hand. His butler found him unconscious in a pool of blood. From then until his death in Paris the following year, he suffered intensely and was attended to by a gendarme, to whom he paid a crown a day.

To the Abbé Sieyès Chamfort had given fortune in the title of a pamphlet (Qu'est-ce que le Tiers-État ? Tout. Qu'a-t-il ? Rien), and Sieyès was also the person to whom he told his sarcastic bon mot Ah ! mon ami, je m'en vais enfin de ce monde, où il faut que le cœur se brise ou se bronze (And so I leave this world, where the heart must either break or turn to lead.)

Suffering from a skin condition and very weak, he died next April at 10, rue Chabanais, Paris.

== Writings ==
The writings of Chamfort include comedies, political articles, literary criticisms, portraits, letters, and verses. His Maximes et Pensées, highly praised by John Stuart Mill, are, after those of La Rochefoucauld, among the most brilliant and suggestive sayings of the modern era. His aphorisms, less systematic and psychologically less important than those of La Rochefoucauld, are as significant in their violence and iconoclastic spirit of the period of storm and preparation that gave them birth as the Réflexions in their exquisite restraint and elaborate subtlety are characteristic of the tranquil elegance of their epoch. Moreover, they have the advantage of richness of colour, picturesqueness of phrase, passion, and audacity. Sainte-Beuve compares them to well-minted coins that retain their value, and to keen arrows that arrivent brusquement et sifflent encore. Although situated at the exact opposite of the political spectrum (see French Revolution) the maxims of Antoine de Rivarol are among those that easily compare in acidity and brilliance.

== Works ==
- Praise of Molière, crowned (1769)
- The Fountain of Praise (1774)
- The young Indian (1764); La Jeune Indienne: Comédie en Un Acte Et en Vers. Princeton University Press. 1945.
- The Merchant of Smythe, comedy
- Mustapha and Zéangir, tragedy.

=== Collected works ===
- By Pierre Louis GINGUENE, 1795, 4 vols.
- Sébastien-Roch-Nicolas Chamfort (1968). P. R. Auguis (ed.). Oeuvres complètes de Chamfort. Slatkine. (original edition Auguis, 1824, 5 vol.)
- Sébastien-Roch-Nicolas Chamfort (1969). Products of the perfected civilization: selected writings of Chamfort. Translator William Stanley Merwin. Macmillan.
- Sébastien-Roch-Nicolas Chamfort (1794). Oeuvres de Chamfort. Vol. 1. Imprimerie des sciences et arts.
- Sébastien-Roch-Nicolas Chamfort (1794). Oeuvres de Chamfort. Vol. 2. Imprimerie des sciences et arts.
- Sébastien-Roch-Nicolas Chamfort (1794). Oeuvres de Chamfort. Vol. 3. Imprimerie des sciences et arts.
- Sébastien-Roch-Nicolas Chamfort (1794). Oeuvres de Chamfort. Vol. 4. Imprimerie des sciences et arts.
- Sébastien-Roch-Nicolas Chamfort (1812). Oeuvres complètes de Chamfort, de l'académie française. Vol. 1 (3 ed.). Maradan.
- Sébastien-Roch-Nicolas Chamfort (1812). Oeuvres complètes de Chamfort, de l'académie française. Vol. 2 (3 ed.). Maradan.
- Sébastien-Roch-Nicolas Chamfort (1824). Pierre-René Auguis (ed.). Oeuvres complètes de Chamfort: recueillies et publiées avec une notice historique sur la vie et les écrits de l'auteur. Vol. 1. Chaumerot Jeune.
- Pierre-René Auguis, ed. (1824). Oeuvres complètes de Chamfort. Vol. 4. Chaumerot Jeune.
- Sébastien-Roch-Nicolas Chamfort (1824). Pierre-René Auguis (ed.). Oeuvres complètes de Chamfort, de l'académie française. Vol. 5. Maradan.
- Nicolas Chamfort (1902). William G. Hutchison (trans.) The Cynic's Breviary: Maxims and anecdotes from Nicolas de Chamfort
