= Charlotte Vanhove =

French actress and playwright

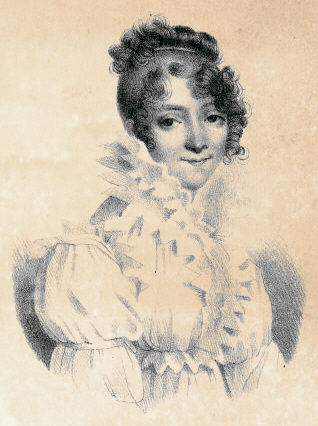
Portrait of Vanhove in her 50s.

Charlotte Vanhove (10 September 1771 – 11 April 1860) was a French stage actress and playwright. She was active at the Comedie-Francaise from 1786. She is also known as a writer, and was the author of several plays and books.

== Life ==
Charlotte Vanhove was born in 1771 in The Hague, Dutch Republic. She was the daughter of actor Charles-Joseph Vanhove and actress Adnree Coche.

=== Early career ===
Being the daughter of two stage actors, Charlotte was destined for the theater. At the age of fourteen, she began studying and working at the Comedie-Francaise in 1785. In that same year, she took her title role in the play Iphigenia by Jean Racine. A few years later, Charlotte married a violinist, but shortly after the wedding, Charlotte asked for and was granted a divorce.

During the Terror of Robespierre, Comedie-Francaise came into conflict with the government. On the night of 2 September 1793, Charlotte was arrested along with twelve other actors of the French Theater, all of whom were suspected of being royalists. She, along with the twelve other actors, were arrested on charges of suspicion shortly after their performance of Pamela on 1 August, which officials believed was seditious towards the Crown. Charlotte and the twelve other actors were kept at the Prison Saints-Pelagie. They were released five months later.

=== Post-Revolution career ===
After her release, Charlotte continued to perform comedy. In 1798, she and her father began purchasing a large estates starting with the Malgouverne in Bruony, France. Next, the pair bought the Governance and its Park which was put up for sale by previous owner Ribbing Frederick. Soon after, Charlotte met Joseph Talma, one of the most famous stage actors of her time. At the time, Talma was married to dancer Julie Carreau. Even though Talma was famous, he had amassed a significant amount of debt which his wife, Julie, took on. After their meeting, Charlotte and Talma started to grow close until they official began a life together. Julie, who was alone, half-ruined, and disgraced, accepted a divorce.

Talma and Charlotte officially married in 1802. During their marriage, Talma began expensive renovations to the two estates which Charlotte had just bought with her father, renovations which he initially paid for. Not long after the wedding, Talma took on a mistress with whom he had three children. She died soon after the last child was born and Talma took a new mistress. Despite the financial assistance of Talma's close friend, Napoleon Bonaparte, his debts began to pile up. Charlotte then began to take charge of the households and soon asks for a divorce. When her request is denied, she leaves the theater and is able to recover a sizable portion of her money that Talma spent. Charlotte, with her recouped funds, moved into a small hotel where she was surrounded by gardens and friends.

She is described as a beautiful blonde who enjoyed painting, drawing, and the theater.

=== Later life ===
Shortly after moving into the small hotel, Charlotte began to devoted her life to the arts once again. She started to paint and draw, but most of all she wrote. She is known for writing Edmonton and Juliette in 1820, The Castle of Valmire in 1821, The Venetian in 1822, The Guilty Bride in 1824 and The Theatrical Act in 1835. Still married by law, Charlotte and Talma had little contact even though she took care of his three children. She paid their expenses and when they were sent to the Fontenay-sous Bois, she paid for that too.

When Talma died in 1826, she married the Conte de Chalot and became Countess Vanhove. The Count, who was a lifelong close friend with whom she enjoyed long walks and conversation with, died soon after their marriage. Countess Vanhove spent the rest of her days going down the Champs-Élysées in her carriage and attending the theater often.

On 11 April 1860, Charlotte died at the age of 90 in a Parisian hotel in Saint-Germain-des-Pres.

== Performances ==
- 1785: Britannicus by Jean Racine- Junie
- 1785: Eugenie of Pierre Beaumarchais- Eugenie
- 1785: Iphigenie by Jean Racine- Iphigenie
- 1785: Phaedra by Jean Racine- Aricie
- 1786: The Cavalier Without Fear and Without Reproach by Jacques Marie Boutet- The eldest daughter
- 1786: Apelles and Campaspe de Voiron- Campaspe
- 1786: Virginia
- 1786: The Misanthrope by Molière- Elionte
- 1787: The School of the Fathers by Pierre- Alexandre Pieyre- Mme de Courval
- 1787: Athalie by Jean Racine- Zacharie
- 1787: George Dandin by Molière- Angelique
- 1787: Tartuffe by Molière- Mariane
- 1788: The Barber of Seville de Beaumarchais- Rosine
- 1793: Pamela
- 1795: The Arab Family- Odeide
- 1797: Agamemnon by Népomucène Lemercier- Cassandre
- 1799: Mathilde by Jacques-Marie Boutet- Mathilde
- 1799: The Guilty Mother by Beaumarchais- Countess Almaviva
- 1799: Tartuffe by Molière- Elmire
- 1799: Abufar by Jean Francois Ducis- Selma
- 1800: Camille-Camille
- 1800: Montmorency- Anne
- 1800: Orphis by Nepomucene Lemercier- Nais
- 1800: Oscar Son of Ossian d'Antoine-Vincent Arnoult- Malvina
- 1800: Othello- Hedelmone
- 1800: Pinto- Duchess of Baraganca
- 1801: Faedor and Wladamir- Arzeline
- 1801: Henry VIII- Anne Boulen
- 1801: Andromaque- Andromaque
- 1802: Bajazet- Atalide
- 1802: Isle and Orovese by Nepomucene Lemercier- Isule
- 1802: The King and the Laborer- Felicie
- 1803: The Curious- Siri Brahe
- 1803: The Misanthrope- Celimene
- 1804: Shakespeare in Love- Clarence
- 1804: Peter the Great- Catherine
- 1805: Amelie Mansfield- Amelie
- 1805: The Domestic Tyrant- Mme Vilmont
- 1806: The Youth of Henry V- Lady Clara
- 1806: The False Samnanblues- Orphise
- 1807: Theodore Abduction Projects Bread- Araminte
- 1807: The Marriage by Figara de Beaumarchais- The Countess
- 1808: Man of Convenience by Etieme do Jouy- Mm de Surville
- 1808: The Reconciliation of Julie Condeille- Mme de Mersenne
- 1809: The Knights of Industry by Alexandre-Vincent Pineux Duval- Mme Franval
- 1810: Mother Confidante by Pierre de Marivaux- Mme Argante
