= François-Joseph Talma =

French actor

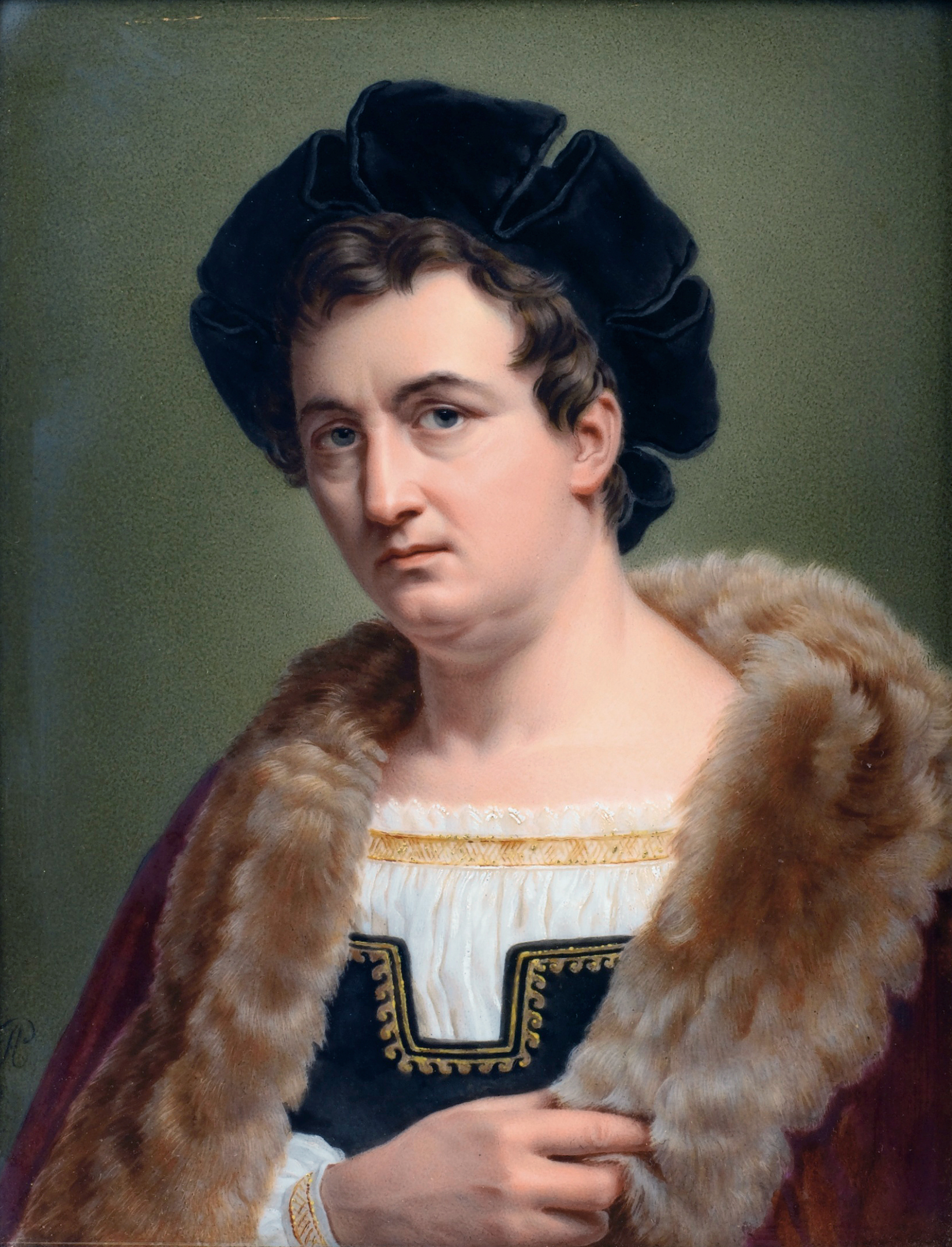
- 1823 portrait of Talma by Aimée Perlet
- Born: 15 January 1763; Paris, France
- Died: 19 October 1826 (aged 63); Paris, France
- Occupation: Actor
- Years active: 1787–1826

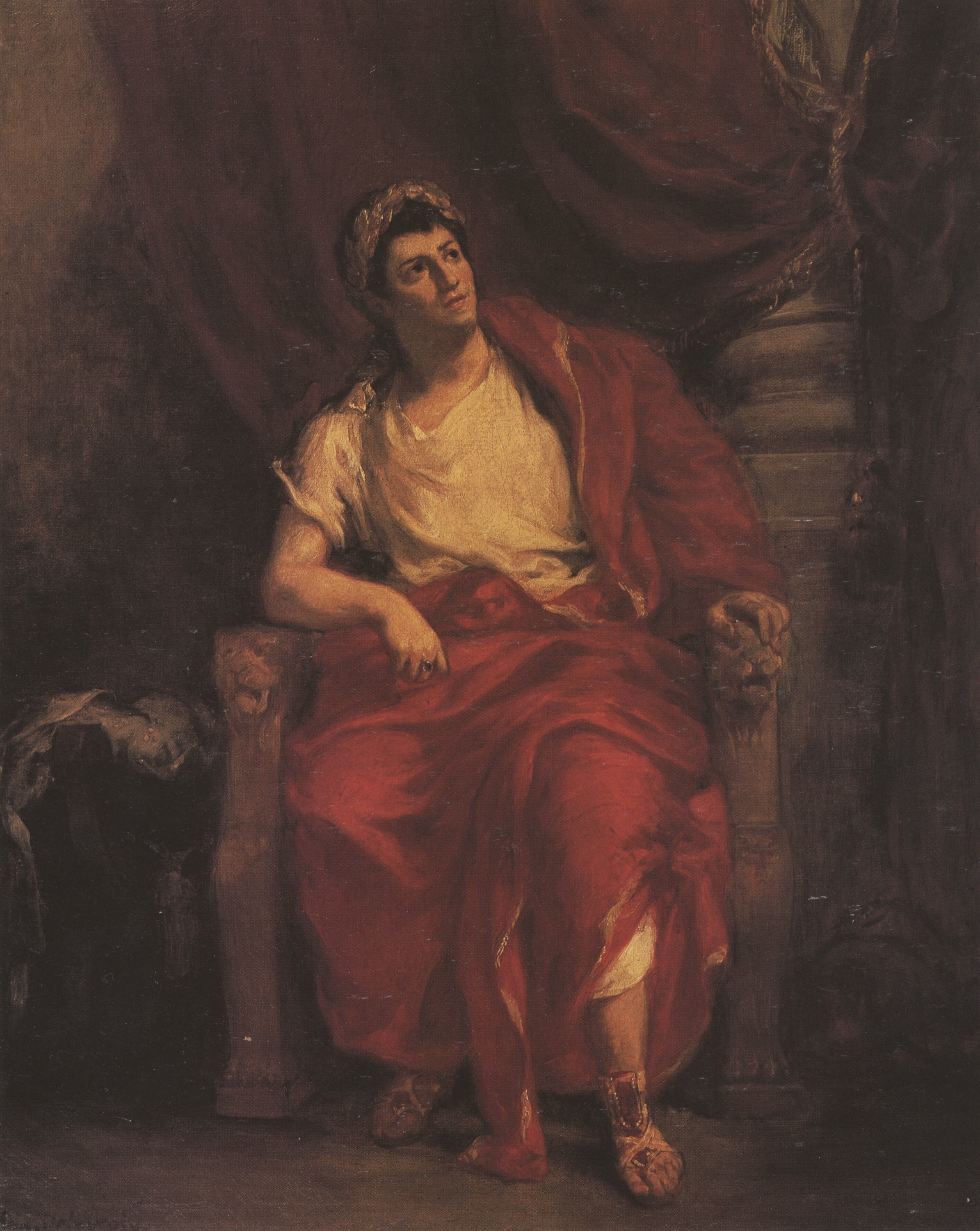
Talma as Nero in Racine's Britannicus, painted by Eugène Delacroix.

François Joseph Talma (15 January 1763 – 19 October 1826) was a French actor.

== Life ==
He was born in Paris. His father, a dentist, moved to London, and saw that his son received a good English education. François Joseph returned to Paris, where for a year and a half he himself practised dentistry. His predilection for the stage was cultivated in amateur theatricals, and on 21 November 1787 he made his debut at the Comédie-Française as Seide in Voltaire's Mahomet. His efforts from the first won approval, but for a considerable time he only obtained secondary parts.

It was as a juvenile lead that he first came to prominence, and he only gradually achieved his unrivalled position as the exponent of strong and concentrated passion. Talma was among the earliest advocates of realism in scenery and costume, being aided by his friend, the painter Jacques-Louis David. His first step in this direction was to appear in the small role of Proculus in Voltaire's Brutus, with a toga and short Roman haircut, much to the surprise of an audience accustomed to 18th century costume on stage, regardless of whether it suited the part played. He is often credited with having introduced the male Neoclassical hairstyle.

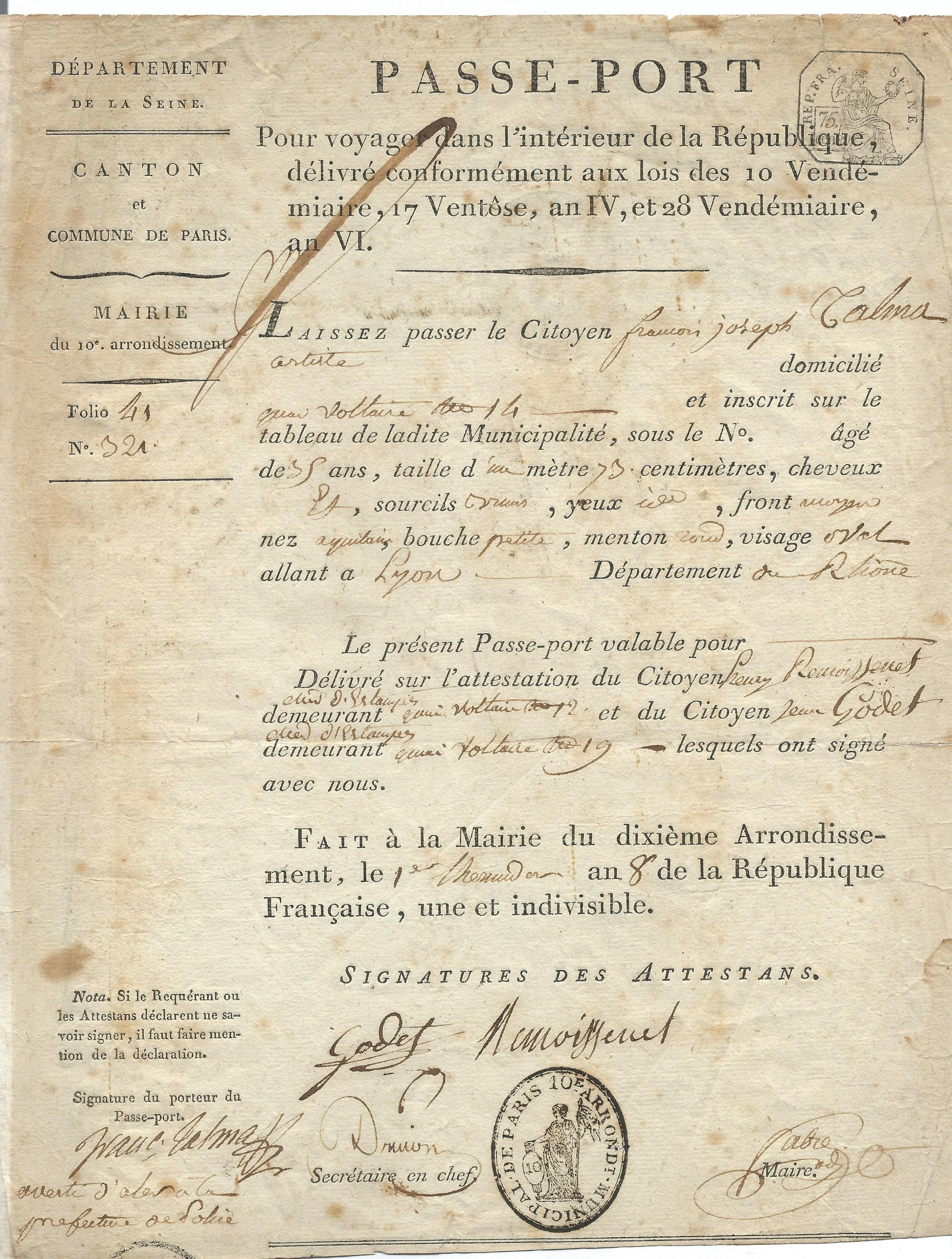
1800 passport issued to François-Joseph Talma

Talma possessed the physical gifts to enable him to excel, a striking appearance and a voice of beauty and power, which he gradually trained to perfection. At first somewhat stilted and monotonous in his manner, he came to be regarded as a model of simplicity. Talma married Julie Carreau, a rich and talented lady whose salon attracted the principal Girondists. The actor was an intimate friend of Napoleon, who delighted in his society - they knew each other even when the latter was an obscure officer in the French Army - and even, on his return from Elba, forgave him for performing before Louis XVIII. In 1808 the emperor had taken him to Erfurt and made him play the Mort de Cesar to a company of crowned heads. Five years later he took him to Dresden.

Talma was also a friend of Joseph Chénier, Georges Danton, Camille Desmoulins and other revolutionists. It was in Chenier's anti-monarchical Charles IX, produced on 4 November 1789, that a prophetic couplet on the destruction of the Bastille made the house burst into a salvo of applause, led by Mirabeau. This play was responsible for the political dissensions in the Comédie-Française which resulted in the establishment, under Talma, of a new theatre.

By the 1820s, Talma was established as "the dominant personality at the Comédie-Française, where he alone could still successfully impose classical tragedy upon the public". It was at this time that a young Alexandre Dumas, on one of his first visits to Paris, was inspired by a performance by Talma.

Talma made his last appearance on 11 June 1826 as Charles VI in Delaville's tragedy, and he died in Paris on 19 October of that year.

In The Case of Wagner, Nietzsche references one of Talma's dictums while derisively characterizing Wagner as an actor, and not a musician:

One is an actor by virtue of being ahead of mankind in one insight: what is meant to have the effect of truth must not be true. The proposition was formulated by Talma; it contains the whole psychology of the actor; it also contains--we need not doubt it--his morality. Wagner's music is never true.

But it is taken for true; and thus it is in order.

== See also ==
- Troupe of the Comédie-Française in 1790
