= Sophie Devienne =

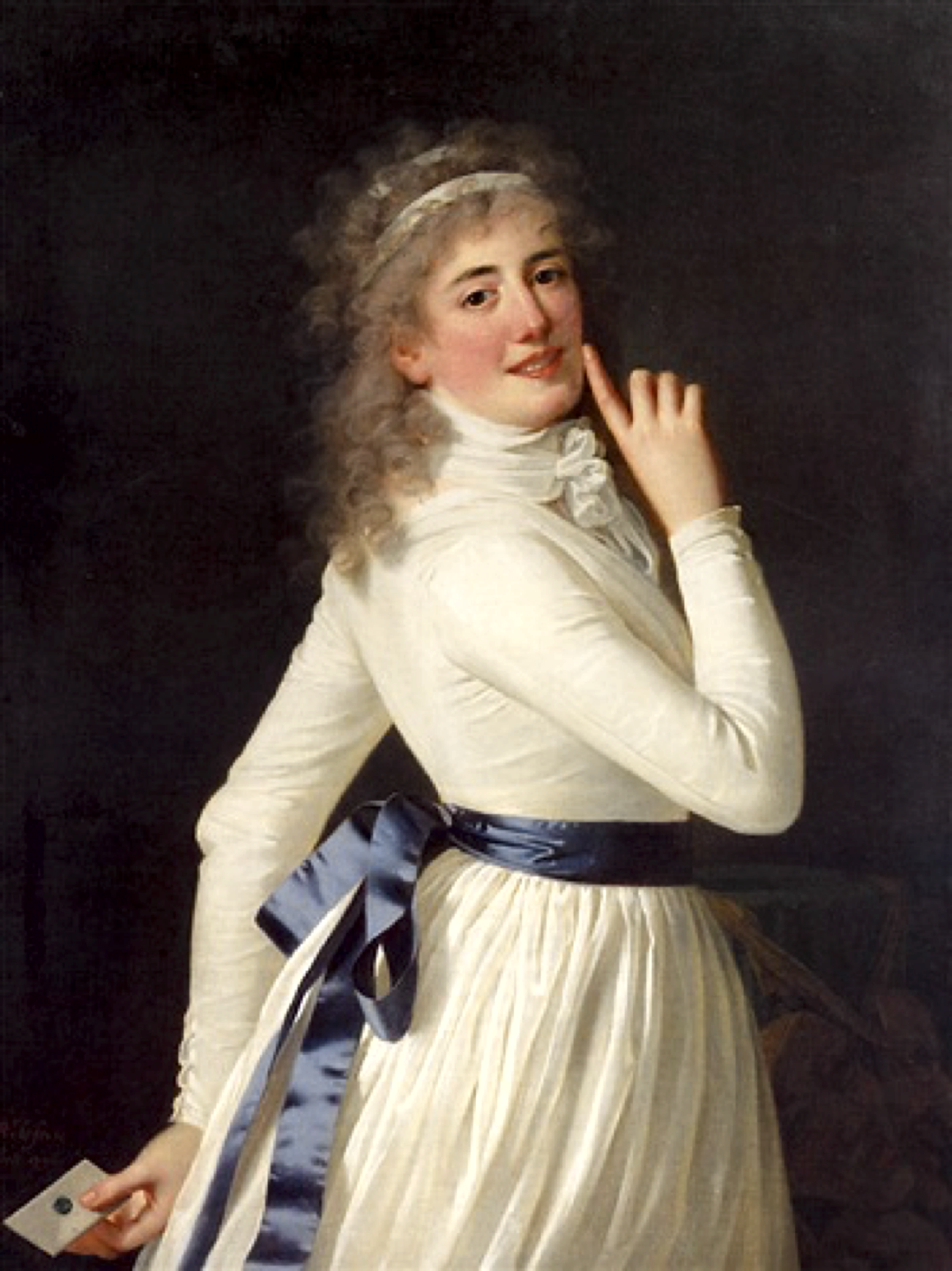
Sophie Devienne

Sophie Devienne (1763–1841) was a French stage actress.

She was engaged at the Comédie-Française in 1786.

She became a Sociétaires of the Comédie-Française in 1786.

She retired in 1813.
