= Denis d'Inès =

French actor and theatre director

- Born: Joseph-Victor-Octave Denis; 1 September 1885; Paris
- Died: 25 September 1968 (aged 83); Paris
- Occupation(s): Actor, theatre director

Denis d'Inès, real name Joseph-Victor-Octave Denis, (1 September 1885 - 25 October 1968) was a French actor and theatre director for some plays. He entered the Comédie-Française in 1914, was a sociétaire from 1920 to 1953, and General administrator by intérim in 1945.

== Filmography ==
- 1910: Hop-Frog (by Henri Desfontaines)
- 1910: Le Scarabée d'or (by Henri Desfontaines)
- 1911: Falstaff (Short, by Henri Desfontaines)
- 1911: Olivier Cromwell (Short, by Henri Desfontaines)
- 1911: La Mégère apprivoisée (by Henri Desfontaines)
- 1911: Le Roman de la momie (by Henri Desfontaines)
- 1913: Shylock (by Henri Desfontaines)
- 1938: La Tragédie impériale (by Marcel l'Herbier) - Évèque Gregorian
- 1938: Heroes of the Marne (by André Hugon) - l'abbé Riton
- 1939: Savage Brigade (by Jean Dréville)
- 1944: La Malibran (by Sacha Guitry) - Berryer
- 1945: Boule de suif (by Christian-Jaque) - Le curé d'Uville
- 1948: D'homme à hommes (by Christian-Jaque) - Général Dufour
- 1948: The Lame Devil (by Sacha Guitry) - Don Basile dans 'Le barbier de Séville'
- 1950: Cartouche, roi de Paris (by Guillaume Radot)
- 1950: Véronique (by Robert Vernay)
- 1951: Les Deux Gamines (by Maurice de Canonge) - M. Bertal
- 1951: Paris Still Sings (by Pierre Montazel) - Le maître d'hôtel
- 1952: Leathernose (by Yves Allégret) - Le duc de Laval
- 1952: Trial at the Vatican (by André Haguet) - L'évêque de Bayeux
- 1954: On Trial (by Julien Duvivier) - Pierre - Paul Maurizius
- 1954: Madame du Barry (by Christian-Jaque) - Cardinal Richelieu
- 1955: Napoléon (by Sacha Guitry) - Siéyès (uncredited)
- 1955: Andrea Chénier (by Clemente Fracassi) - Contessa di Coigny
- 1955: Le Souffle de la liberté (by Clemente Fracassi)
- 1956: Si Paris nous était conté (by Sacha Guitry) - Fontenelle
- 1959: Drôles de phénomènes (by Robert Vernay) - Gaëtan du Chastelet (final film role)

== Theatre ==
=== Outside the Comédie-Française ===
- 1905: Vers l'amour by Léon Gandillot, mise en scène André Antoine, Théâtre Antoine
- 1908: Parmi les pierres by Hermann Sudermann, Théâtre de l'Odéon
- 1909: La Mort de Pan by Alexandre Arnoux, mise en scène André Antoine, Théâtre de l'Odéon
- 1909: Beethoven by René Fauchois, mise en scène André Antoine, Théâtre de l'Odéon
- 1909: Les Grands by Pierre Veber and Serge Basset, Théâtre de l'Odéon
- 1909: La Bigote by Jules Renard, mise en scène André Antoine, Théâtre de l'Odéon
- 1910: Cœur maternel by Oscar Franck, mise en scène André Antoine, Théâtre de l'Odéon
- 1911: L'Armée dans la ville by Jules Romains, mise en scène André Antoine, Théâtre de l'Odéon
- 1911: Rivoli by René Fauchois, Théâtre de l'Odéon
- 1911: Musotte by Guy de Maupassant and Jacques Normand, Théâtre de l'Odéon
- 1912: La Foi by Eugène Brieux, Théâtre de l'Odéon
- 1912: Troilus and Cressida by William Shakespeare, mise en scène André Antoine, Théâtre de l'Odéon
- 1912: L'Honneur japonais by Paul Anthelme, Théâtre de l'Odéon
- 1912: Le Double Madrigal by Jean Auzanet, mise en scène André Antoine, Théâtre de l'Odéon
- 1912: Faust by Johann Wolfgang von Goethe, Théâtre de l'Odéon
- 1913: La Maison divisée by André Fernet, Théâtre de l'Odéon
- 1913: Rachel de Gustave Grillet, Théâtre de l'Odéon
- 1913: La Rue du Sentier by Pierre Decourcelle and André Maurel, Théâtre de l'Odéon
- 1914: Le Bourgeois aux champs by Eugène Brieux, Théâtre de l'Odéon
- 1917: Manon en voyage opéra comique in 1 act by Jules Massenet and Claude Terrasse, Théâtre Édouard VII

=== Comédie-Française ===
- Admission at the Comédie-Française in 1914
- Sociétaire de 1920 à 1953
- Administrateur général par intérim from 1 July 1945 to October 1945
- Dean from 1945 to 1953
- 361th sociétaire
- Sociétaire honoraire in 1954
- 1914: Le Prince charmant by Tristan Bernard, Comédie-Française
- 1919: L'Hérodienne by Albert du Bois, Comédie-Française
- 1920: La Fille de Roland by Henri de Bornier, Comédie-Française
- 1920: L'Amour médecin by Molière, Comédie-Française
- 1920: Romeo and Juliet by William Shakespeare, Comédie-Française
- 1920: Le Repas du lion by François de Curel, Comédie-Française
- 1920: Les Deux Écoles by Alfred Capus, Comédie-Française
- 1920: Barberine by Alfred de Musset, mise en scène Émile Fabre, Comédie-Française
- 1921: La Robe rouge by Eugène Brieux, Comédie-Française
- 1921: La Coupe enchantée by Jean de La Fontaine and Champmeslé, Comédie-Française
- 1921: Les Fâcheux by Molière, Comédie-Française
- 1921: Monsieur de Pourceaugnac by Molière, Comédie-Française
- 1921: Un ami de jeunesse by Edmond Sée, Comédie-Française
- 1922: Le Festin de pierre by Molière, Comédie-Française
- 1922: Marion Delorme by Victor Hugo, Comédie-Française
- 1922: Vautrin by Edmond Guiraud after Honoré de Balzac, Comédie-Française
- 1923: Le Dépit amoureux by Molière, Comédie-Française
- 1923: Un homme en marche by Henry Marx, Comédie-Française
- 1924: Molière et son ombre by Jacques Richepin, Comédie-Française
- 1924: Quitte pour la peur by Alfred de Vigny, Comédie-Française
- 1924: Manon by Fernand Nozière, Théâtre de la Gaîté
- 1925: Bettine by Alfred de Musset, Comédie-Française
- 1925: Hedda Gabler by Henrik Ibsen, Comédie-Française
- 1925: Maître Favilla by Jules Truffier after George Sand, Comédie-Française
- 1927: La Torche sous le boisseau by Gabriele D'Annunzio, Comédie-Française
- 1933: La Tragédie de Coriolan by William Shakespeare, mise en scène Émile Fabre, Comédie-Française
- 1935: Madame Quinze by Jean Sarment, mise en scène de l'auteur, Comédie-Française
- 1935: Lucrezia Borgia by Victor Hugo, mise en scène Émile Fabre, Comédie-Française
- 1936: La Rabouilleuse by Émile Fabre after Honoré de Balzac, mise en scène Émile Fabre, Comédie-Française
- 1938: Le Bourgeois gentilhomme by Molière, mise en scène Denis d'Inès, Comédie-Française
- 1938: Tricolore by Pierre Lestringuez, mise en scène Louis Jouvet, Comédie-Française
- 1939: Le Mariage de Figaro by Beaumarchais, mise en scène Charles Dullin, Comédie-Française
- 1939: Cyrano de Bergerac by Edmond Rostand, mise en scène Pierre Dux, Comédie-Française
- 1939: Le Jeu de l'amour et de la mort by Romain Rolland, mise en scène Denis d'Inès, Comédie-Française
- 1940: On ne badine pas avec l'amour by Alfred de Musset, mise en scène Pierre Bertin, Comédie-Française
- 1940: Twelfth Night by William Shakespeare, mise en scène Jacques Copeau, Comédie-Française
- 1941: Lucrèce Borgia by Victor Hugo, mise en scène Émile Fabre, Comédie-Française
- 1941: Léopold le bien-aimé by Jean Sarment, mise en scène Pierre Dux, Comédie-Française
- 1941: Le Beau Léandre by Théodore de Banville and Paul Siraudin, directed by Denis d'Inès Comédie-Française
- 1941: La Farce de Maître Pathelin, Comédie-Française
- 1942: Gringoire by Théodore de Banville, mise en scène Denis d'Inès, Comédie-Française
- 1943: Vidocq chez Balzac by Émile Fabre after Honoré de Balzac, mise en scène Émile Fabre, Comédie-Française
- 1943: Boubouroche by Georges Courteline, Comédie-Française
- 1943: Courteline au travail by Sacha Guitry, Comédie-Française
- 1943: La Dame de minuit by Jean de Létraz, directed by Denis d'Inès
- 1944: La Seconde Surprise de l'amour by Marivaux, directed by Pierre Bertin, Comédie-Française
- 1944: Le Bourgeois gentilhomme by Molière, mise en scène Pierre Bertin, Comédie-Française
- 1944: Le Malade imaginaire by Molière, mise en scène Jean Meyer, Comédie-Française
- 1945: Antony and Cleopatra by William Shakespeare, mise en scène Jean-Louis Barrault, Comédie-Française
- 1946: Le Voyage de monsieur Perrichon by Eugène Labiche and Édouard Martin, mise en scène Jean Meyer, Comédie-Française
- 1946: Le Mariage de Figaro by Beaumarchais, mise en scène Jean Meyer, Comédie-Française
- 1947: Ruy Blas by Victor Hugo, mise en scène Pierre Dux, Comédie-Française
- 1950: A Winter Tale by William Shakespeare, mise en scène Julien Bertheau, Comédie-Française
- 1951: L'Arlésienne by Alphonse Daudet, mise en scène Julien Bertheau, Comédie-Française at the Théâtre de l'Odéon
- 1951: Madame Sans Gêne by Victorien Sardou, mise en scène Georges Chamarat, Comédie-Française
- 1951: Le Bourgeois gentilhomme by Molière, mise en scène Jean Meyer, Comédie-Française
- 1952: The Clouds by Aristophane, mise en scène Socrato Carandinos, Comédie-Française
- 1952: Romeo and Juliet by William Shakespeare, mise en scène Julien Bertheau, Comédie-Française

=== Theater director ===
- 1938: Le Bourgeois gentilhomme, Comédie-Française
- 1939: Le Jeu de l'amour et de la mort by Romain Rolland, Comédie-Française
- 1942: Gringoire by Théodore de Banville, Comédie-Française
- 1945: Une visite de noces by Alexandre Dumas fils, Comédie-Française
- 1948: Lucrezia Borgia by Victor Hugo, Comédie-Française
