= List of French playwrights =

This is an incomplete list of playwrights from France in chronological order, according to date of birth.

== 16th century ==
- Theodore Beza (1519–1605)
- Étienne Jodelle (1532–1573)
- Robert Garnier (1544–1590)
- Alexandre Hardy (1570–1632)

== 17th century ==
- Jean Mairet (1604–1686)
- Pierre du Ryer (1606–1658)
- Pierre Corneille (1606–1684)
- Jean Rotrou (1609–1650)
- Cyrano de Bergerac (1619–1655)
- Molière (1622–1673)
- Samuel Chappuzeau (1625–1701)
- Thomas Corneille (1625–1709)
- Philippe Quinault (1635–1688)
- Jean Racine (1639–1699)
- Jacques Robbe (1643-1721)
- Charles Rivière Dufresny (1648–1724)
- Jean Palaprat (1650–1721)
- Antoine de La Fosse (1653–1708)
- Madame Ulrich (1665–1707)
- Antoine Houdar de La Motte (1672–1731)
- Pierre de Marivaux (1688–1763)
- Pierre-François Godard de Beauchamps (1689–1761)
- Voltaire (1694–1778)
- Françoise de Graffigny (1695–1758)

== 18th century ==
- Pierre Beaumarchais (1732–1799)
- Louis-François Faur (1746–1829)
- Olympe de Gouges (1748–1793)
- Jean-Claude Gorgy (1753-1795)
- Jean Armand Charlemagne (1753–1838)
- Étienne Aignan (1773–1824)
- Victor Henri Joseph Brahain Ducange (1783–1833)
- Eugène Scribe (1791–1861)
- Alfred de Vigny (1797–1863)
- Antoinette Henriette Clémence Robert (1797–1872)
- Honoré de Balzac (1799–1850)

== 19th century ==
- Victor Hugo (1802–1885)
- Alexandre Dumas, père (1802–1870)
- Prosper Mérimée (1803–1870)
- Alfred de Musset (1810–1857)
- Théophile Gautier (1811–1872)
- Adolphe Salvat (died 1876)
- Émile Augier (1820–1889)
- Gustave Flaubert (1821–1880)
- Alexandre Dumas, fils (1824–1895)
- Henri de Bornier (1825–1901)
- Laetitia Marie Wyse Bonaparte (1831–1902)
- Victorien Sardou (1831–1908)
- Henry Becque (1837–1899)
- Auguste Villiers de l'Isle-Adam (1838–1889)
- Émile Zola (1840–1902)
- Brada (1847-1938)
- Jules Lemaître (1853–1914)
- François, Vicomte de Curel (1854–1928)
- Maurice Bouchor (1855–1929)
- Paul Hervieu (1857–1915)
- Georges Courteline (1858–1929)
- Eugène Brieux (1858–1932)
- Marie Léopold-Lacour (1859-1942)
- Henri Lavedan (1859–1949)
- Charles Maurice Donnay (1859–1945)
- Georges Feydeau (1862–1921)
- Albert Guinon (1863–1923)
- Jules Renard (1864–1910)
- Edmond Rostand (1868–1918)
- Paul Claudel (1868–1955)
- Henry Kistemaeckers (1872–1938)
- Alfred Jarry (1873–1907)
- Fanny Clar (1875-1944)
- Guillaume Apollinaire (1880–1918)
- Jean Giraudoux (1882–1944)
- Sacha Guitry (1885–1957)
- Paul Gury (1888-1974)
- Jean Cocteau (1889–1963)
- Louis Verneuil (1893–1952)
- Rose Celli (1895–1982)
- Antonin Artaud (1896–1948)
- Marcel Achard (1899–1974)

== 20th century ==
- Jean Tardieu (1903–1995)
- Jean-Paul Sartre (1905–1980)
- Georges Schehadé (1905–1989)
- Eugène Ionesco (1909–1994)
- Jean Anouilh (1910–1987)
- Jean Genet (1910–1986)
- Albert Camus (1913–1960)
- Armand Gatti (1924–2017)
- Bernard-Marie Koltès (1948–1989)
- Yasmina Reza (born 1959)
- Éric-Emmanuel Schmitt (born 1960)
- Pavel Hak (born 1962)
- Sedef Ecer (born 1965)
