= Berthe Cerny =

French actress (1868–1940)

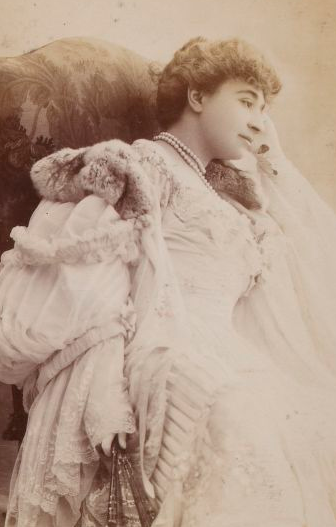
- Berthe de Choudens by Jean Reutlinger
- Born: Françoise Berthe-Hélène-Lucie de Choudens; 31 January 1868; Paris, France
- Died: 27 March 1940 (aged 72)
- Occupation: Actress

Berthe Cerny (born Françoise Berthe-Hélène-Lucie de Choudens; 31 January 1868 – 27 March 1940) was a French actress, known as an elegant blonde beauty. She had a brilliant career, interpreting both classical and contemporary roles. She had several affairs, including with the politicians Aristide Briand and Paul Reynaud, and had two sons by other lovers. She joined the Comédie-Française in 1906 and became a sociétaire in 1909.

== Early career ==
Françoise Berthe-Hélène-Lucie de Choudens was born on 31 January 1868 in Paris. At a very young age she was a student of Gustave Worms at the Conservatoire de Paris. She graduated in 1885 with a first prize in acting. In 1886 she had a child, Jacques Robert de Choudens (1887–1915), by an unknown father. She played under the stage name Berthe Cerny at the Théâtre de l'Odéon, then the Théâtre du Vaudeville, then other venues, and for twenty years pursued a brilliant career on the boulevards. She played notable roles in plays by Paul Hervieu, Marcel Prévost and Georges de Porto-Riche.

Les Annales du Théâtre et de la Musique for 1893 reported three plays that featured Berthe Cerny. In January she appeared at the Théâtre du Gymnase Marie Bell in Je dîne chez ma mère by Adrien Decourcelle. The critic wrote, "Mlle. Berthe Cerny, who had just had a great success in Brussels, had taken over Sophie Arnould's role with infinite charm and grace." In April she appeared again at the Théâtre du Gymnase Marie Bell as Maman Clémentine in the Homme à l'oreille cassée by Pierre Decourcelle and Antony Mars, after the novel by Edmond About. She appeared at the Théâtre du Palais-Royal in November as Etiennette in the romantic comedy Leurs Gigolettes by Henri Meilhac and Albert de Saint-Albin. The critic said, "Berthe Cerny is fine and perverse; she shows us, moreover, with laudable disinterest, two exquisitely molded legs in pretty stockings of black silk."

In 1895 Alexandre Dumas, fils repeated the stale idea that actresses must be immoral, saying the "feverish work, the quest for feigned emotions, the thirst for applause, the joys of triumph ... raise their bodies to a temperature they must maintain in real life." Berthe Cerny was among those who contradicted him in the pages of Le Temps, saying that a well-behaved but talented actress could easily portray vice.

== Wealthy lovers ==
In 1897 Berthe Cerny formed a relationship with Raoul William Johnston (1870–1915), a polytechnician and mining engineer, administrator of the Mines d'Albi. Johnston was the wealthy owner of the Beaucaillou Bordeaux vineyards. She had a child by him, François Johnston (1898–1936). She was given a beautiful house in Saint-Cloud by her lover.

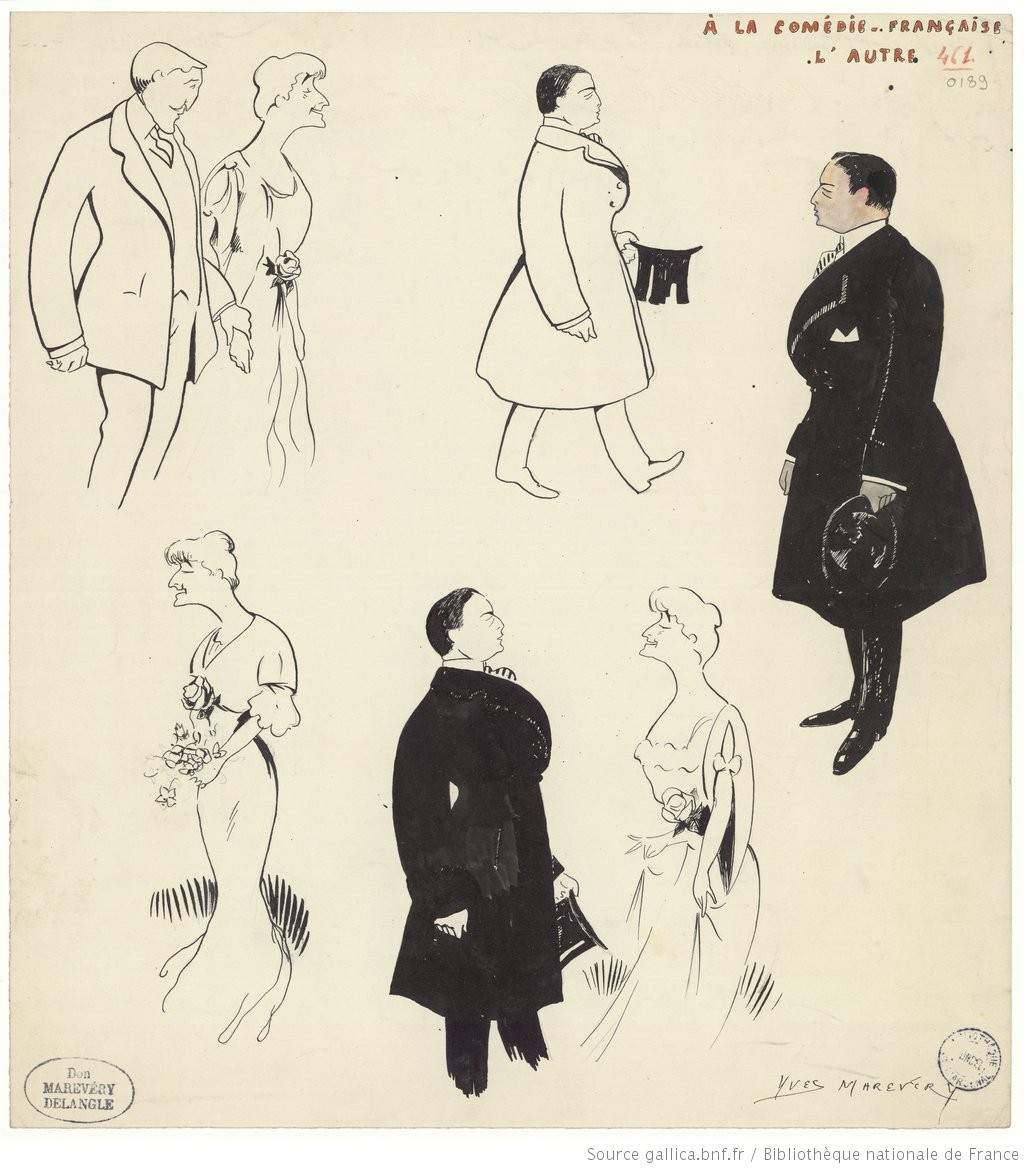
Georges Grand, Berthe Cerny and Marcel Dessonnes in "L'autre" by Paul and Victor Margueritte, December 1907

Berthe began a relationship with the politician Aristide Briand in 1907. When Briand fell for her she was a blonde beauty, charming and elegant in the long dresses and high hats of the period. She had natural assurance and was financially secure due to her "bon ami" Johnston. By 1910 the former socialist's politics had moved to the right due to her influence. He had taken a liking to visiting salons, where he met writers, artists and women of high society. In 1913 Briand met Princess Marie Bonaparte, wife of Prince George of Greece. For a long time she refused Briand's advances, since she did not want to share him with Berthe. The rupture finally came in April 1916, when Berthe wrote to Briand telling him not to visit her again, and to let her gently forget him.

Later Berthe Cerny formed a relationship with the politician Paul Reynaud.

== Comédie-Française ==
In 1906 Berthe Cerny joined the Comédie-Française at the request of Maurice Donnay, for whom she created Paraître. She became a sociétaire in 1909. She dominated the classical repertoire in roles such as Célimène in Molière's The Misanthrope, Suzanne in Pierre Beaumarchais's The Marriage of Figaro and Alcmene in Moliere's Amphitryon. She also starred in Henry Becque's La Parisienne. Just before and after World War I (1914–18) Berthe Cerny performed in two plays by Pierre de Marivaux in which Louis Jouvet said she relived the spirit of Italian theatre. She played the Comtesse in Marivaux's Le Legs before the war, giving a perfect interpretation of the role. She played Araminte in Marivaux's Les Fausses Confidences in April 1918. The play was a success, and received good reviews from most critics.

In the postwar period she was able to relax, playing only 20 times a year for the Comédie-Française. She appeared in the 1922 documentary film Molière, sa vie, son oeuvre directed by Jacques de Féraudy. In modern theater she gave excellent performances as heroines in the plays of Paul Géraldy, François de Curel and Henry Bataille, including the baronne Irène in Bataille's Maman Colibri. She retired in 1930 and was at once named an honorary member of the Comédie-Française. She died on 27 March 1940 in Paris, and was buried in the Cimetière d'Auteuil.

== Performances ==
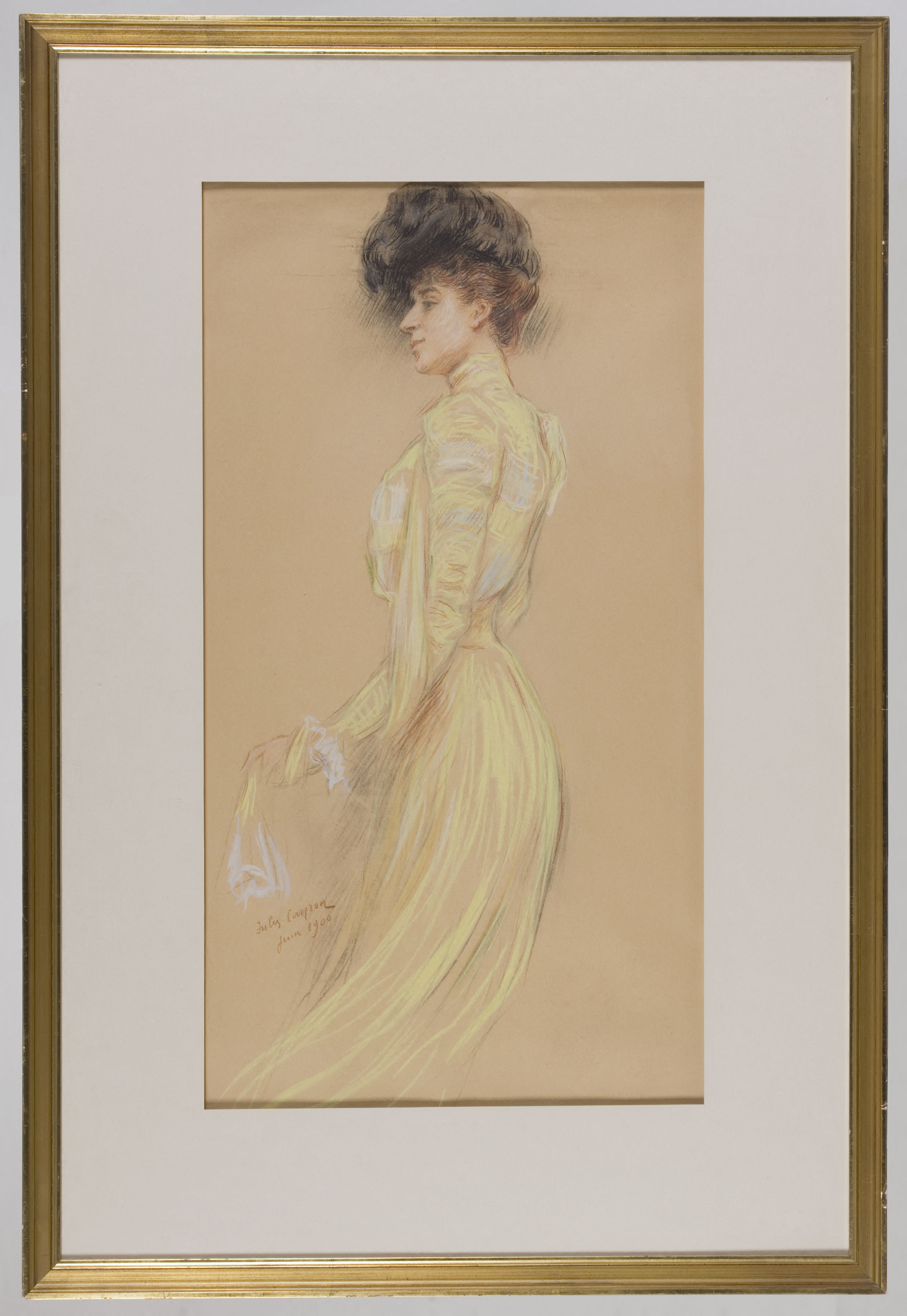
Berthe Cerny in 1900 by Jules Cayron

A sample of plays in which Berthe Cerny performed:

1927	Les Flambeaux de la noce – Saint-Georges de Bouhélier
1926	La Carcasse – Denys Amiel
1925	Robert et Marianne – Paul Géraldy
1921	Les Fâcheux – Molière
	Le Sicilien – Molière staged by Georges Berr
1920	Maman Colibri – Henry Bataille
	Les Effrontés – Émile Augier
1919	Le Voile déchiré – Pierre Wolff
	Les Soeurs d'amour – Henry Bataille
1917	Les Noces d'argent – Paul Géraldy
1914	Deux couverts – Sacha Guitry
	Amphitryon – Molière
1912	Bagatelle – Paul Hervieu
	L'Embuscade – Henry Kistemaeckers
	Le Ménage de Molière – Maurice Donnay
1908	Le Misanthrope – Molière staged by Jules Truffier
1907	L'Autre – Paul Margueritte
	La Rivale – Henry Kistemaeckers...
	Le Mariage de Figaro – Pierre Beaumarchais
1906	Poliche – Henry Bataille
	Les Mouettes – Paul Adam
	La Courtisane – André Arnyvelde
	Paraître – Maurice Donnay
1905	La Cousine Bette – Pierre Decourcelle...
	L'Armature – after Paul Hervieu
1904	La Gueule du loup – Maurice Hennequin...
	Décadence – Albert Guinon
1897	Le Passé – Georges de Porto-Riche
1896	La Meute – Abel Hermant
1895	Le Collier de la reine – Pierre Decourcelle...
1893	L'Homme à l'oreille cassée – Pierre Decourcelle...
1892	Monsieur chasse ! – Georges Feydeau

== Sources ==
- Berlanstein, Lenard R. (2009-06-30), Daughters of Eve: A Cultural History of French Theater Women from the Old Regime to the Fin de Siècle, Harvard University Press, ISBN 978-0-674-02081-8
- Berthe Cerny (1868–1940) (in French), BnF: Bibliotheque nationale de France
- "Berthe Cerny", Les Archives du Spectacle (in French), 31 January 1868
- Dubois-Geoffroy, Claude (2012), Blanche et ses trois Georges (in French), Lulu.com, ISBN 978-2-9543286-0-7
- Girard, Patrick (1999-02-10), Ces Don Juan qui nous gouvernent (in French), Editions 1, ISBN 978-2-84612-351-8
- Greene, E. J. H. (1965-12-15), Marivaux, University of Toronto Press, Scholarly Publishing Division, ISBN 978-1-4875-9787-0
- Hélène-Lucie de Choudens dite BERTHE CERNY (in French), Comédie-Française
- Miquel, Pierre (1989-10-04), La Troisième République (in French), Fayard, ISBN 978-2-213-63885-0
- "Molière, sa vie, son oeuvre", IMDB
- Noël, Edouard; Stoullig, Edmond (1894), Les Annales du théâtre et de la musique, Librairie Paul Ollendorff
- Pierfit, "Berthe de CHOUDENS", Geneanet (in French)
- "Raoul JOHNSTON (mort en 1915)", Annales des Mines (in French)
- Sabouret, Anne (1990-05-04), Une femme éperdue (in French), Grasset, ISBN 978-2-246-42049-1
- Steinegger, Catherine (2005), La musique à la Comédie-Française de 1921 à 1964: aspects de l'évolution d'un genre (in French), Editions Mardaga, ISBN 978-2-87009-889-9
