= Robbe (surname) =

Robbe is a surname. Its primary origins as a surname are from French, Frisian, Dutch and Low German, from its use as a personal name as a shortening of Robert. In French, it may also be written as Robbé. Other iterations of the surname derive from French nicknames, with Robbe or Robe referring to a robber, and Robbé or Robé referring to someone who has been robbed. Notable people with the surname include:

- Albert Robbe (1916–?), Belgian boxer
- Alice Robbe (born 2000), French tennis player
- Jacques Robbe (1643–1721), French engineer and geographer
- Jan Robbe (born 1980), Belgian musician
- Lon Robbé (born 1946), Dutch painter
- Makenzy Robbe (born 1994), American soccer player
- Manuel Robbe (1872–1936), French painter and printmaker
- Mario Robbe (born 1973), Dutch darts player
- Michel Robbe (born 1946), French film and theater actor and television host
- Scott Robbe (1955–2021), American film and television producer

== See also ==
- Robbe-Grillet
