= Jeanne Olivier =

French actress

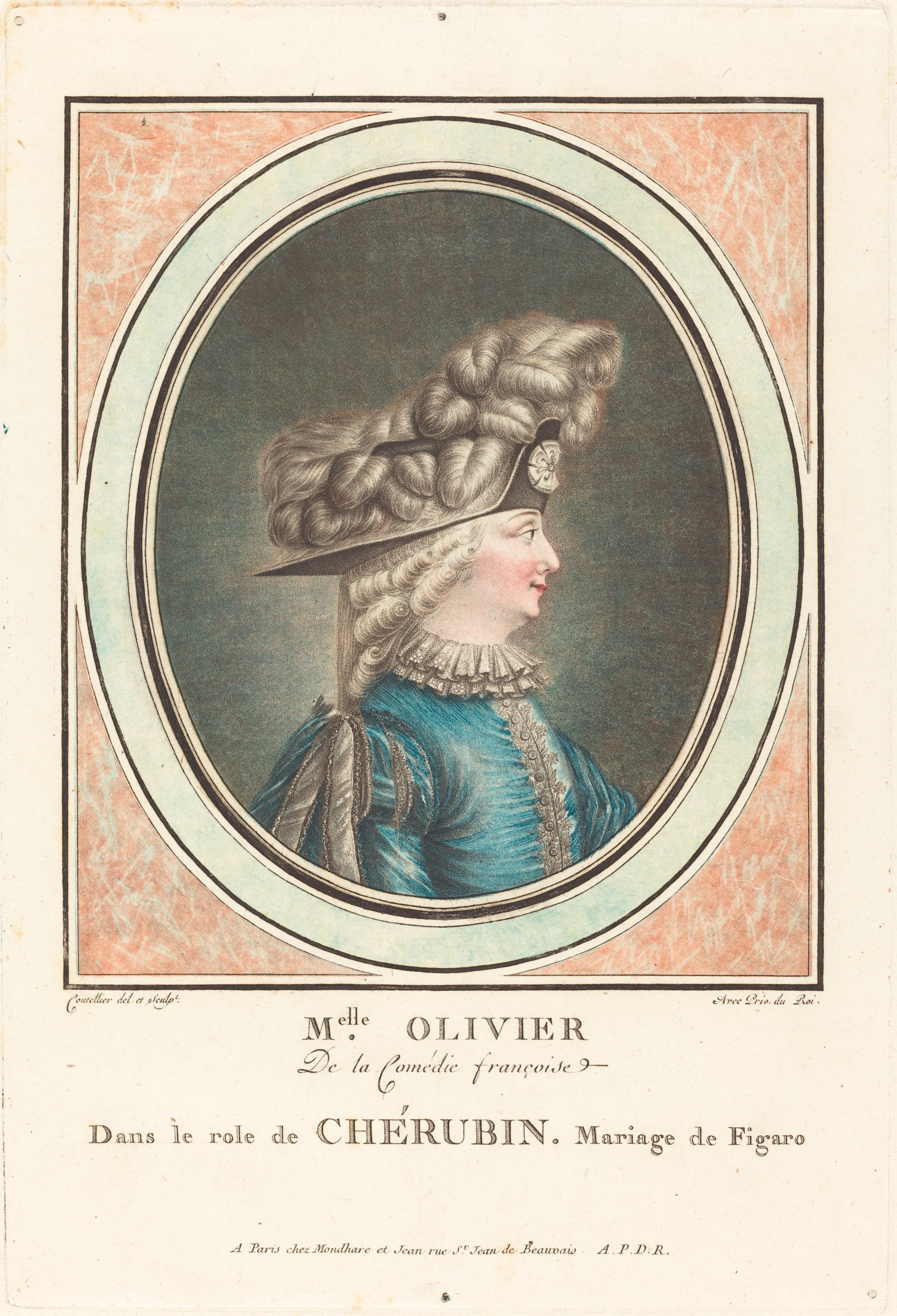
Mademoiselle Olivier as Chérubin in Beaumarchais' The Marriage of Figaro

Jeanne-Adélaïde Gérardin (1764–1787), stage name Jeanne Olivier, was a French stage actress.

She was engaged at the Comédie-Française in 1780. She became a Sociétaires of the Comédie-Française in 1781.

She had a successful career at the theatre where she was a star attraction and created seventeen celebrated ingénue-roles during her career there.
