= Choudens =

Choudens is a French surname. It may refer to:

- Antony de Choudens (1849–1902), French music publisher and occasional composer
- Hélène Lucie de Choudens (1868–1940), French actress under the stage name Berthe Cerny
- Paul de Choudens (1850–1925), French musician, music publisher, poet and librettist
