= Jean Sarment =

French actor (1897–1976)

- Born: Jean Bellemère; 13 January 1897; Nantes
- Died: 29 March 1976 (aged 79); Boulogne-Billancourt
- Occupations: Actor, writer

Jean Sarment, real name Jean Bellemère, (13 January 1897 – 29 March 1976) was a French film and stage actor and a writer. He was nominated administrator of the Comédie-Française in July 1944 although he won't occupy the position.

== Selected filmography ==
- 1934 : Léopold le bien-aimé, directed by Arno-Charles Brun (script, dialogue and main interpret) : Léopold
- 1938 : Terre de feu, directed by Marcel L'Herbier (script)
- 1939 : Terra di fuoco, directed by Giorgio Ferroni and Marcel L'Herbier, Italian version of the latter (script)
- 1941 : The Chain Breaker, directed by Jacques Daniel-Norman
- 1958 : Ihr 106. Geburtstag, directed by Günther Lüders
- 1963 : The Trip to Biarritz, directed by Gilles Grangier
- 1971 : Au théâtre ce soir : Sur mon beau navire by Jean Sarment, directed by Jean-Laurent Cochet, TV director Pierre Sabbagh, Théâtre Marigny

== Theatre ==
=== Author ===
- 1920 : La Couronne de carton, play in four acts and one prologue, Théâtre de l'Œuvre, directed by Lugné-Poe, on 4 February 1920 at Paris, distinguished by the Académie française, Paul Hervieu prize in 1920, reprise at the Comédie-Française on 19 March 1934
- 1921 : Le Pêcheur d'ombres, comedy, Théâtre de l'Œuvre, directed by Lugné-Poe, 15 April 1921 at Paris
- 1922 : Le Mariage d'Hamlet, play in three acts and one prologue, premiered in 1922 at Mayence, reprise at Paris at the Théâtre de l'Odéon on 10 November 1922
- 1923 : Le Carnaval des enfants
- 1924 : Je suis trop grand pour moi, play in four acts, Comédie-Française, 26 March 1924 at Paris
- 1924 : Les Six Grimaces de Don Juan, one act play, Studio des Champs-Elysées, Paris
- 1924 : L'Arlequin, libretto of the lyrical comedy in five acts and six tableaux by Max d'Ollone, premiered on 24 December 1924 at the Opéra de Paris
- 1925 : Madelon, four act play, written in collaboration with Robert Rousseau de Bauplan, Théâtre de la Porte-Saint-Martin, directed by Émile Bertin, 17 March 1925 at Paris
- 1925 : Les Plus beaux yeux du monde, comedy in three acts, Théâtre du Journal, directed by René Collin, 24 October 1925 at Paris
- 1926 : As-tu du cœur, comedy in three acts, théâtre de la Renaissance, 3 October 1926 at Paris
- 1927 : Léopold le bien-aimé, comedy in three acts, directed by Louis Jouvet, Comédie des Champs-Élysées, 12 October 1927 at Paris, reprise at la Comédie-Française on 29 September 1941, directed by Pierre Dux
- 1928 : Sur mon beau navire, comedy in three acts, cowritten with Robert Rousseau de Bauplan, premiered at Théâtre de la Michodière on 30 November 1928
- 1930 : Bobard, four act comedy, cowritten with Robert Rousseau de Bauplan, Théâtre Antoine, 9 April 1930
- 1930 :Facilité, comedy in two acts, Théâtre Montparnasse, directed by Gaston Baty
- 1931 : Le Plancher des vaches, comedy in three acts and four tableaux, premiered at Théâtre de Monte-Carlo on 21 November 1931
- 1933 : Peau d'Espagne, comedy in four acts, cowritten with Robert Rousseau de Bauplan, Théâtre de l'Athénée, 29 March 1933 at Paris
- 1934 : Le Discours des prix, play in three acts and four tableaux, directed by Jacques Baumer, Théâtre Saint-Georges, 27 September 1934 at Paris
- 1935 : Madame Quinze, play in three acts and ten tableaux, Comédie-Française, 20 February 1935
- 1935 : L'Impromptu de Paris, à-propos in one act, premiered on 26 Octobre 1935 at Théâtre des Champs-Élysées
- 1936 : Le Voyage à Biarritz, play in one act, premiered on 28 April 1936 at Comédie-Française
- 1936 : Beaucoup de bruit pour rien, comedy in four parts after the work by Shakespeare Much ado about nothing
- 1937 : Othello, drama in three parts and ten tableaux, translated and adapted from the play by Shakespeare Othello, premiered on 30 December 1937 at Théâtre de Monte-Carlo, remade in Paris on 14 May 1938 at Théâtre de l'Odéon
- 1938 : Sur les marches du palais, three act comedy, premiered on 21 December 1938, Théâtre des Arts
- 1941 : Mamouret, play in three parts and twelve tableaux, directed by Charles Dullin, Théâtre de Paris on 11 February 1941
- 1942 : Don Carlos, adaptation of the play by Friedrich von Schiller, Théâtre de l'Odéon, 11 April 1942
- 1948 : Roméo et Juliette, translation and adaptation in three parts of the five act play by Shakespeare Romeo and Juliet
- 1951 : Nous étions trois, three act play, premiered at Nice at Palais de la Méditerranée on 22 February 1951, reprise at Paris at the Théâtre de l'Athénée 25 April 1951
- 1953 : Le Collier de jade, Comédie-Wagram, 27 January 1953 at Paris
- 1955 : Le Pavillon des enfants, play in two parts and eight tableaux, directed by Julien Bertheau, scenography François Ganeau, Comédie-Française, 24 May 1955 at Paris

=== Actor ===
- 1917 : Les Fourberies de Scapin by Molière, directed by Jacques Copeau, Garrick's Theatre New York
- 1917 : Twelfth Night by William Shakespeare, directed by Jacques Copeau, Garrick's Theatre
- 1917 : La Navette by Henry Becque, directed by Jacques Copeau, Garrick's Theatre
- 1918 : La Surprise de l'amour by Marivaux, directed by Jacques Copeau, Garrick's Theatre
- 1918 : L'Amour médecin by Molière, directed by Jacques Copeau, Garrick's Theatre
- 1918 : The Brothers Karamazov by Fiodor Dostoïevski, directed by Jacques Copeau, Garrick's Theatre
- 1918 : Blanchette by Eugène Brieux, directed by Jacques Copeau, Garrick's Theatre
- 1918 : Le Gendre de M. Poirier by Émile Augier and Jules Sandeau, directed by Jacques Copeau, Garrick's Theatre
- 1918 : The Marriage of Figaro by Beaumarchais, directed by Jacques Copeau, Garrick's Theatre
- 1918 : Georgette Lemeunier by Maurice Donnay, directed by Jacques Copeau, Garrick's Theatre
- 1918 : Crainquebille by Anatole France, directed by Jacques Copeau, Garrick's Theatre
- 1918 : Le Médecin malgré lui by Molière, directed by Jacques Copeau, Garrick's Theatre New York
- 1920 : La Couronne de carton by Jean Sarment, directed by Lugné-Poe, Théâtre de l'Œuvre
- 1921 : Le Pêcheur d'ombres by Jean Sarment, directed by Lugné-Poe, Théâtre de l'Œuvre
- 1921 : La Couronne de carton by Jean Sarment, Théâtre de Paris
- 1925 : Madelon de Jean Sarment, directed by Émile Bertin, Théâtre de la Porte-Saint-Martin
- 1923 : La Couronne de carton by Jean Sarment, Théâtre de l'Odéon
- 1927 : Léopold le bien-aimé, directed by Louis Jouvet, Comédie des Champs-Élysées : : l'abbé
- 1928 : Sur mon beau navire by Jean Sarment, Théâtre de la Michodière
- 1929 : Le Pêcheur d'ombres by Jean Sarment, directed by René Rocher, Comédie-Caumartin
- 1930 : Bobard de Jean Sarment, directed by René Rocher, Théâtre Antoine
- 1932 : Le Plancher des vaches by Jean Sarment, Théâtre Antoine
- 1933 : Peau d'Espagne by Jean Sarment, Théâtre de l'Athénée
- 1936 : Le Voyage à Biarritz, with André Brunot, Comédie-Française

=== Books ===
- 1925 : Lettres à Corysandre, édition Albin Michel, Paris, 227 pages
- 1930 : De la flûte au tambour, éditions Librairie de France, 146 pages
- 1931 : Lord Arthur Morrow Cowley, roman, édition Charpentier Fasquelle, Paris, 245 pages
- 1948 : Le Livre d'or de Florimond, édition Aux portes du large, Nantes, 254 pages
- 1950 : Charles Dullin, éditions Calmann-Lévy, collection " Masques et Visages ", 152 pages
- 1964 : Poèmes, éditions de la Revue Moderne, Paris, 300 pages, contenant : 1. Le cœur d'enfance 2. De la flûte au tambour 3. Reflets 4. Patries perdues et retrouvées
- 1977 : Cavalcadour, éditions J. C. Simoën, 546 pages, autobiographie romancée, où l'on retrouve les " protagonistes de l'aventure d'autrefois ", Michel Carassou, Jacques Vaché et le groupe de Nantes.

== Bibliography ==
2007 : Les Solennels, ISBN 978-2-916275-53-6, cowritten with Jacques Vaché with whom he was friends; also includes drawings and unpublished texts by Jacques Vaché.
