= Henri Albers =

French opera singer

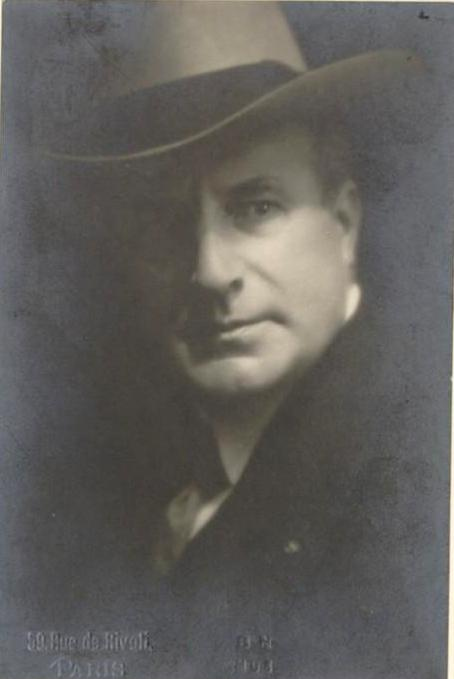
Albers photographed circa 1920

Henri Albers, born Johan Hendrik Albers (1 February 1866 – 12 September 1926), was a Dutch-born opera singer who later became a French citizen. He sang leading baritone roles in an international career that spanned 37 years and was a prominent singer at the Théâtre de la Monnaie in Brussels and the Opéra-Comique in Paris, which was his base from 1900 until his death. He also sang in 36 performances with the Metropolitan Opera company from 1898 to 1899. He made many recordings for Pathé Records and specialised in the heavier baritone and basso cantante repertoire.

== Life and career ==
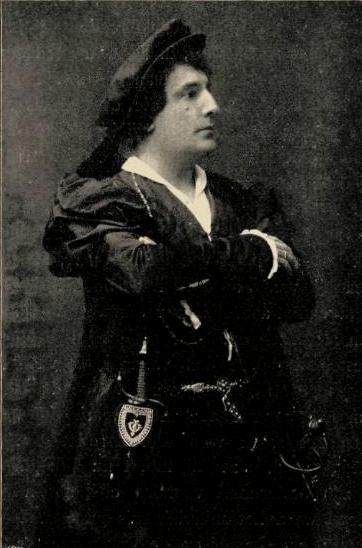
As Hamlet in Ambroise Thomas's Hamlet

Albers was born in Amsterdam and initially trained and worked as an actor. He then studied singing at the Conservatorium van Amsterdam and was engaged by Johannes George De Groot to sing with his newly established Hollandsche Opera company. He made his operatic debut in 1889 as Méphistophélès in a Hollandsche Opera production of Gounod's Faust and during the next two years continued singing leading roles with the company. In 1891, on the recommendation of De Groot, he met with the French composer Jules Massenet and auditioned for him. Massenet was impressed and encouraged him to study further in Paris and to broaden his horizons beyond Amsterdam. After further singing studies in Paris with Jean-Baptiste Faure, Albers made his first stage appearance outside Holland when he was engaged by the French opera company in Antwerp. In 1892, he sang Jean d'Hautecoeur in the company's first production of Alfred Bruneau's Le rêve and began a lifelong friendship with the composer, appearing in many of his operas.

After Antwerp, Albers was engaged as Principal Baritone at the Opéra de Bordeaux and went on to sing at the Royal Opera House in London and the Opéra de Monte-Carlo. He was engaged by the Metropolitan Opera in 1898 and sang with the company both on tour and in New York City. He made his company debut on 8 November 1898 as Mercutio in the Met's touring performance of Roméo et Juliette in Chicago. He remained with the company through 1899, appearing 36 times in eight different operas and tackling his first Wagnerian role, Wolfram in Tannhäuser. On his return to Europe he sang regularly at the Théâtre de la Monnaie in Brussels from 1901 to 1906 and added several more Wagnerian roles to his repertoire: Telramund in Lohengrin; Hans Sachs in Die Meistersinger von Nürnberg; Wotan in Das Rheingold, Siegfried, and Die Walküre; and Kurwenal in Tristan und Isolde. A highly versatile singer, he also appeared in the title roles of La Monnaie's productions of Hamlet, Rigoletto, Hérodiade, and Le roi Arthus, as well as singing Count di Luna in Il trovatore, Iago in Otello, and Baron Scarpia in Tosca.

In 1899, he had also been engaged by the Opéra-Comique in Paris where he sang leading baritone and bass-baritone roles for the next 25 years in 39 different operas. Although it became his "home" opera house, he continued to appear at La Monnaie, the Paris Opéra, and several other European opera houses from time to time. He became a naturalized French citizen in 1920. In late August 1926 at Aix-les-Bains, Albers once again sang the role of Jean d'Hautecoeur in Le rêve. A month later, he died in Paris of a sudden illness at the age of 60. At the time of his death, he was on the administrative council of the Union des Artistes dramatiques et lyriques des théâtres français.

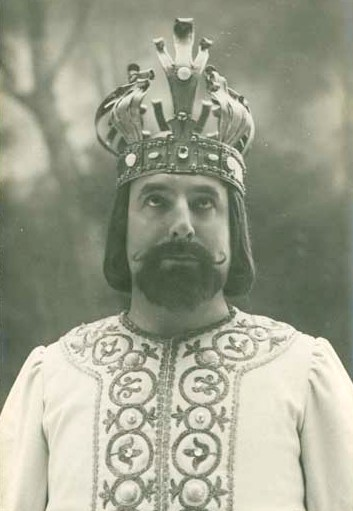
As Arthus in Chausson's Le roi Arthus

== Roles created ==
Roles created by Henri Albers include:

- Étranger in Vincent d'Indy's L'étranger, 7 January 1903, Théâtre de la Monnaie, Brussels
- Arthus in Ernest Chausson's Le roi Arthus, 30 November 1903, Théâtre de la Monnaie, Brussels
- Macbeth in Ernest Bloch's Macbeth, 30 November 1910, Opéra-Comique, Paris
- Napoléon in Jean Nouguès's L'Aigle, 4 February 1912, Théâtre des Arts, Rouen
- L'Auguste in Jean Nouguès Les Frères Danilo, commissioned by Pathé Records specifically for the gramophone, recorded 1912–1913
- Père Jean in Xavier Leroux's Les cadeaux de Noël, 25 December 1915, Opéra-Comique, Paris
- Cardinal Cibo in Ernest Moret's Lorenzaccio, 19 May 1920, Opéra-Comique, Paris
- Pierre in Xavier Leroux's La plus forte, 11 January 1924, Opéra-Comique, Paris
