= Léopold Lacour =

French teacher, sociologist, writer and feminist

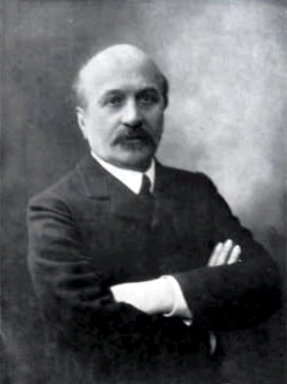
- Born: February 9, 1854
- Died: 1939 (aged 85)
- Occupations: Teacher, writer
- Known for: Historical view of feminism

Léopold Lacour (9 February 1854 – 1939) was an influential French teacher, sociologist, writer and feminist.

== Biography ==
Léopold Lacour was born in 1854. He attended the École Normale Supérieure and graduated with distinction. He then taught history in several provincial schools. His last teaching post was at the Lycée Saint-Louis in Paris. He left teaching to become a full-time writer. His work included plays, criticism, sociology and history, including his major work Humanisme intégral (1896). He and Pierre Decourcelle made a play from Paul Bourget's Mensonges, which was first performed on 18 April 1889.

Léopold Lacour assisted with the 1896 International Feminist Congress in Paris, presided over by Marie Bonnevial, which discussed coeducation. There was much argument and little agreement. Marie Léopold-Lacour gave a presentation that outlined the state of mixed schools in Europe and gave a response to the opponents of coeducation. Many of the elements of the presentation were taken from the work of Léopold Lacour. As the first mixed school in France, the Prévost orphanage of Cempuis received much attention. Lacour and Pauline Kergomard were able to obtain agreement on the final resolution, in favor of changing to a coeducational system in all countries.

Lacour gave well-attended talks on the fashionable subject of feminism at the Théâtre de la Bodinière. He often gave lectures on the French Revolution, and in 1900 published an essay called Les Origines du féminisme contemporain: Trois femmes de la révolution: Olympe de Gouges, Théroigne de Méricourt, Rose Lacombe (The Origins of Contemporary Feminism. Three Women of the Revolution: Olympe de Gouges, Théroigne de Méricourt, Rose Lacombe) In this study he emphasized the importance of free and robust intellectualism to the feminist cause.

Léopold Lacour died in 1939 at the age of 85. His remains are in Montparnasse cemetery.

== Views ==
Léopold Lacour was a socialist and a feminist, believing that women deserved and must strive for a full and rich life without restrictions. He preferred the word "humanism" to "feminism", considering that it better conveyed the idea of sexual harmony. He believed in equality of the sexes, in the sense of equal rights. Women in the late 19th century had to contend with the misogynist views of writers such as Alexandre Dumas, Émile Zola and Octave Mirbeau. These authors thought Lacour and others sympathetic to feminism such as Victor Margueritte and Jules Bois were traitors to their sex, calling them "les vaginards."

Klejman and Rochefort said that while Eliska Vincent created le féminisme historique, Léopold Lacour is without a doubt the first to undertake an historian's examination of feminism."

== Bibliography ==
Léopold Lacour was a prolific author. Some books:

- Lacour, Léopold (1880). Trois théâtres: Émile Auger, Alexandre Dumas, fils, Victorien Sardou. Calmann Lévy.
- Lacour, Léopold (1883). Gaulois et parisiens: Eugène Labiche, Henry Meilhac et Ludovic Halévy, Edmond Gondinet. Calmann-Lévy.
- Lacour, Léopold (1896). Humanisme Intégral: Le Duel Des Sexes. la Cité Future. BiblioLife. ISBN 978-1-145-14989-2.
- Lacour, Léopold (1898). Conférences faites aux matinées classiques du théâtre national de l'Odéon et du théâtre de la République par Mme Dieulafoy, MM. Francisque Sarcey, Jules Lemaître et al... Paris: A. Crémieux.
- Lacour, Léopold (1900). Les Origines du féminisme contemporain: Trois femmes de la révolution: Olympe de Gouges, Théroigne de Méricourt, Rose Lacombe. Plon-Nourrit.
- Lacour, Léopold (1901). La Femme dans le théâtre du XIXe siècle.
- Lacour, Léopold (1909). La Révolution française et ses détracteurs d'aujourd'hui: Préface de A. Aulard. Bibliothèque des Réformes sociales.
- Lacour, Léopold (1909). La France moderne, problèmes politiques et sociaux.
- Lacour, Léopold; Richardin, Edmond (1910). Les Femmes Illustres. (Collection Publiée Sous la Direction de M. Edmond Richardin ... Et M. Léopold Lacour.).
- Lacour, Léopold (1910). Jules Renard – Ses contes. Ses romans, ses comédies.
- Lacour, Léopold (1914). Les maîtresses & la femme de Molière. Éditions d'art et de littérature.
- Toledo, Vitalis de; Lacour, Léopold (1915). L'Habit de guerre ; Pièce en 1 acte. Préf. de Léopold Lacour. Sansot.
- Geffroy, Gustave; Lacour, Léopold; Lumet, Louis (1919). La France héroïque et ses alliés. Larousse.
- Lacour, Léopold (1921). Les Premières Actrices Françaises, Etc. [With Plates.].
- Lacour, Léopold (1924). Le Théâtre en Suède.
- Lacour, Léopold (1928). Molière acteur. F. Alcan.
- Lacour, Léopold (1938). Une Longue Vie, Etc. [Reminiscences.].
- Lacour, Léopold (September 2010). Trois Theatres: Emile Augier, Alexandre Dumas Fils, Victorien Sardou (1880). Kessinger Publishing. ISBN 978-1-165-15607-8.
