= Sociétaires of the Comédie-Française =

The sociétaires of the Comédie-Française are chosen from among the pensionnaires who have been in the company a year or more.

They are decided upon in the course of a general assembly of the company's administrative committee, made up of six existing sociétaires, the senior sociétaire, and the general administrator. A pensionnaire is thus named a societaire by a decree of the Ministry of Culture, from names put forward by the general administrator of the Comédie-Française. On becoming a sociétaire, an actor automatically becomes a member of the Société des Comédiens-Français and receives a share of the profits as well as receiving a number of shares in the société to which they are contractually linked.

After their retirement, a sociétaire can continue to act, becoming an honorary sociétaire. The senior member of the Comédie-Française is not the oldest sociétaire, but the sociétaire who has been with the company longest (since their entering it as a pensionnaire).

== Some Sociétaires of the Comédie-Française ==
=== 17th century ===
- Michel Baron (1680)
- Rosimond (1680)
- Armande Béjart (1680)
- Mademoiselle de Brie (1680)
- Champmeslé (1680)
- Marie Champmeslé (1680)
- Mademoiselle Du Croisy (1680)
- Charles Varlet de La Grange (1680)
- Mademoiselle La Grange (1680)
- Raymond Poisson, known as Belleroche (1680)
- Brécourt (1682)
- Dancourt (1685)
- Jean Quinault (1695)
- Charlotte Desmares (1699)

=== 18th century ===
- Quinault-Dufresne (1712)
- Adrienne Lecouvreur (1717)
- Jeanne Gaussin (1731)
- Marie Dumesnil (1738)
- Mademoiselle Clairon (1743)
- Marie Brillant (1750)
- Lekain (1751)
- Mademoiselle Hus (1753)
- Préville (1753)
- Dalainville (1758)
- François Molé (1761)
- Jacques Marie Boutet (1772)
- Dugazon (1772)
- Monvel (1772)
- Dazincourt (1778)
- Marie-Élisabeth Joly (1783)
- Amélie-Julie Candeille (1785)
- Mademoiselle Lange (1788)
- Talma (1789)
- Madame Desgarcins (1789)
- Mademoiselle Fleury (1791)
- Grandmesnil (1792)
- Mademoiselle Mars (1799)

=== 19th century ===
- Mademoiselle George (1804)
- Mademoiselle Anaïs (1832)
- Regnier (1835)
- Rachel (1842)
- Clémentine Jouassain (1863)
- Coquelin aîné (1864)
- Suzanne Reichenberg (1872)
- Jeanne Samary (1874)
- Mounet-Sully (1874)
- Sarah Bernhardt (1875)
- Jules Truffier (1888)
- Marguerite Moreno (1890)
- Jeanne Ludwig (1893)
- Marthe Brandès (1896)
- Raphaël Duflos (1896)

=== 20th century ===
- Cécile Sorel (1904)
- Berthe Cerny (1909)
- Gabrielle Colonna-Romano (1913)
- Denis d'Inès (1920)
- Mary Marquet (1923)
- Pierre Fresnay (1924)
- Gabrielle Robinne (1924)
- Madeleine Renaud (1928)
- Marie Bell (1928)
- Fernand Ledoux (1931)
- Pierre Dux (1935)
- Gisèle Casadesus (1938)
- Julien Bertheau (1942)
- Louis Seigner (1943)
- Jean-Louis Barrault (1943)
- Raimu (1944)
- Jacques Charon (1947)
- Micheline Boudet (1950)
- Jean Davy (1950)
- Robert Hirsch (1952)
- Jean Piat (1953)
- Paul Meurisse (1956)
- Jean Yonnel (1956)
- Denise Gence (1958)
- Georges Descrières (1958)
- Jacques Sereys (1959)
- Jacques Toja
- Jean-Paul Roussillon (1960)
- François Chaumette (1960)
- Bernard Dhéran (1961)
- Catherine Samie (1962)
- Michel Etcheverry (1964)
- Renée Faure (1965)
- Michel Aumont (1965)
- René Camoin (1966)
- Michel Duchaussoy (1967)
- Françoise Seigner (1968)
- Paule Noëlle (1969)
- Isabelle Adjani (1972)
- Jean-Luc Boutté (1975)
- Catherine Hiegel (1976)
- Claude Giraud (1976)
- Francis Huster (1977)
- Patrice Kerbrat (1977)
- Jean Le Poulain (1981)
- Martine Chevallier (1988)
- Michel Favory (1988)
- Catherine Sauval (1989)
- Jean-Luc Bideau (1991)
- Philippe Torreton (1994)
- Andrzej Seweryn (1995)
- Michel Robin (1996)
- Éric Ruf (1998)
- Éric Génovèse (1998)
- Bruno Raffaeli (1998)
- Denis Podalydès (2000)
- Coraly Zahonero (2000)
- Florence Viala (2000)

=== 21st century ===
- Alexandre Pavloff (2002)
- Françoise Gillard (2002)
- Céline Samie (2004)
- Clotilde de Bayser (2004)
- Jérôme Pouly (2004)
- Laurent Stocker (2004)
- Pierre Vial (2005)
- Guillaume Gallienne (2005)
- Laurent Natrella (2007)
- Michel Vuillermoz (2007)
- Elsa Lepoivre (2007)
- Christian Gonon (2009)
- Julie Sicard (2009)
- Loïc Corbery (2010)
- Léonie Simaga (2010)
- Serge Bagdassarian (2011)
- Hervé Pierre (2011)
- Bakary Sangaré (2013)
- Pierre Louis-Calixte (2013)
- Christian Hecq (2013)
- Nicolas Lormeau (2014)
- Gilles David (2014)
- Stéphane Varupenne (2015)
- Suliane Brahim (2016)
- Adeline d'Hermy (2016)
- Georgia Scalliet (2017)
- Jérémy Lopez (2017)
- Clément Hervieu-Léger (2018)
- Benjamin Lavernhe (2019)
- Sébastien Pouderoux (2019)
- Didier Sandre (2020)
- Christophe Montenez (2020)

== See also ==
- Administrators of the Comédie-Française
