= Dalainville =

French actor

Louis-François Molé, called Dalainville (4 October 1732 – November 1801 aged 69) was an 18th-century French actor.

The elder brother of François Molé, Dalainville made his debut at Comédie-Française in 1758. Received as sociétaire that same year, he would remain in the company until 1770.
