= Edmond Fleg =

Jewish French writer (1874–1963)

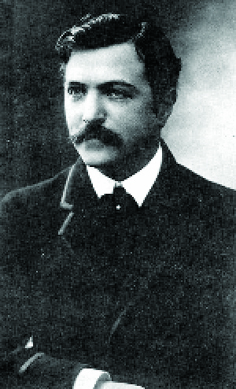
- Born: Edmond Flegenheimer; 26 November 1874; Geneva
- Died: 15 October 1963 (aged 88); Paris
- Occupations: Writer, essayist, poet, playwright, translator
- Organization(s): French Legion of Honor, Alliance Israélite Universelle, Jewish Christian Fellowship Society, Éclaireurs Israélites
- Notable work: Why I am a Jew, Écoute Israel
- Parents: Maurice Flegenheimer (father); Clara Nordmann (mother)
- Awards: Narcisse-Leven prize

Edmond Flegenheimer better known as Edmond Fleg, (26 November 1874 – 15 October 1963) was a Jewish French writer, thinker, novelist, essayist and playwright of the 20th century. Fleg's oeuvre was crucial in constructing a modern French Jewish identity, rendering him an instrumental figure in the Jewish awakening during the interwar years. After World War I, Jewish writers began articulating a new, cultural definition of what it meant to be a Jew within the context of French Third Republic universalism. Through his writings – based on Jewish and Christian texts – Fleg formed the foundation of a modern French Jewish spirituality and self-understanding, which allowed secular French Jews to preserve their Jewish identity. In doing so, Fleg was calling for an exploration of the living texts of traditional Judaism as the basis for a modern Jewish identity, establishing a new literary direction devoted to re-interpreting biblical texts and legends, and liturgies.

== Life ==
Edmond Fleg was born in Geneva on 26 November 1874 to a Swiss-based Alsatian Jewish family. At the time of his birth, Fleg's parents were residing in Geneva, but their familial roots were in France. Given their connection to France, Fleg's family expressed a strong loyalty to the emancipatory values of the French Revolution when Jews were granted full citizenship. As French-identified Jews, Fleg's parents found the principles of Judaism as they understood them to be identical with the liberal ideals of the French revolution: tolerance, equality, and freedom.

Throughout his childhood, Fleg received both a religious and secular education. As a young boy, Fleg quickly began to question god, spirituality, and religion. While reflecting on his Bar Mitzvah, Fleg recalled, "I had no understanding of Hebrew, I didn't understand one word." According to Fleg the entire spectacle felt artificial to him. Years later he would say, "lying in bed, my soul was searching, asking the Eternal to show me when Judaism had become so distasteful." He developed a disdain for his parents' apparent inconsistencies and found the rabbi and cantor to be boring and uninspiring.

He began his formal education, first, in Paris at the Lycée Louis Le Grand and then at École Normale Supérieure. Both institutions were known for its emphasis on Neo-Kantianism which appealed to middle-class Frenchman such as Fleg. In 1899 he qualified as a teacher of the German language. He became the best friend of the editor Lucien Moreau (1875–1932), later one of the leaders of the Action Française. They agreed that Jewish and French nationalisms "traveled in parallel lines", and rejected assimilation.

During World War I, Fleg joined the French Foreign Legion in order to fight for his adopted country. He won the Croix de Guerre and he was honored later, in 1937, by being made an officer of the Legion of Honor.

From 1904 to 1920 Fleg was a successful playwright. His work was influenced by the disturbances caused by the Dreyfus affair, by his participation in the Third Zionist Congress in Basel and by the reports of pogroms. The antisemitism unleashed by the Dreyfus affair, which put France in turmoil, shattered Fleg's world view. Fleg would later write: "Initially the Dreyfus Affair passed unnoticed for me...but later it pushed me into reality and the 'Jewish problem.' It became very difficult to forget completely that you were a Jew." As the affair progressed, Fleg had no doubt that Dreyfus was innocent. This woke Fleg up to the political and social realities around him. Fleg came to believe that the injustice was a sign that he shared the same destiny of Dreyfus by the mere fact that they were both Jews, whether he liked it or not. Fleg, and other Franco-Jewish intellectuals developed a deep sense of betrayal, and many began openly identifying as Dreyfusards. This is also when Fleg heard for the first time about Zionism.

Ecoute, Israël appeared between 1913 and 1948, and the Anthologie juive from 1923 to 1953. In 1928 F. die Schrift published his Pourquoi je suis juif. In 1949 he was co-founder of the Amitiés judéo-chrétiennes. His 1960 work Vers le Monde qui vient gave his message of hope with which he wanted to build a bridge to Christianity.

From 1923 Fleg edited Judaïsme, a book series published by Les Éditions Rieder, Paris.

Both of Fleg's sons were killed fighting for France in the Second World War.

Edmond Fleg died in Paris on 15 October 1963.

== Works ==
Edmond Fleg's writing can be divided into three main categories: religious poetry, biographical works, and autobiographical and other essays on Jewish themes. Considered to be one of France's leading writers, he authored many essays, 17 plays and operas, 10 books of poetry and four novels. He also he compiled anthologies, and translated and adapted work by other writers and poets.

=== Books ===
- Anthologie juive (1921; The Jewish Anthology, 1925)
- L'Enfant prophète (1926; The Boy Prophet, 1928)
- Pourquoi je suis Juif (1928; Why I am a Jew, 1929),
- The life of Solomon (1930)
- Jésus, raconté par le Juif Errant (1933; Jesus, Told by the Wandering Jew, 1934)
- Ecoute Israël (1921)
- Ma Palestine (1932; The Land of Promise, 1933)
- Nous de l'Esperance (1949)
- La Terre que Dieu habite (1953; The Land in which God Dwells, 1955)

=== Plays ===
- La Maison du Bon Dieu (1920)
- Le Juif du Pape (1925; The Pope's Jew)
- Le Message (1904)
- La Bête (1910)
- Le Trouble-fête (1913).

=== Biographies ===
- Moïse raconté par les Sages (1928; The Life of Moses, 1928)
- Salomon (1930; The Life of Solomon, 1929)

=== Translations ===
- Shalom Aleichem and the Passover Haggadah (1925)
- Selections from Maimonides' Guide and from the Zohar.

=== Poetry ===
- La Mur des pleurs / Wall of Weeping (1919)
- Hear O Israel
- The Lord Is Our God,
- The Lord Is One
- And thou shalt love the Lord.

Translations

He translated a part of the Bible in French; Genesis in 1946 and Exodus in 1963.

=== Opera librettist ===
- Ernest Bloch's Macbeth
- George Enescu's Œdipe. He was originally commissioned to write the libretto in 1912, and completed a long version within that year.

== Sources ==
- Ewans, Michael (2007), "Oedipe, Edsmond Fleg and George Enesco", in M. Ewans (ed.), Opera from the Greek: Studies in the Poetics of Appropriation, Ashgate, pp. 105–128, ISBN 9780754660996
- Fleg, Edmond (in German), Historisches Lexikon der Schweiz
- Moricz, Klara (5 February 2008), Jewish Identities: Nationalism, Racism, and Utopianism in Twentieth-Century Music, University of California Press, ISBN 978-0-520-25088-8
