= Les cadeaux de Noël =

Opera in one act composed by Xavier Leroux

- Opera by Xavier Leroux
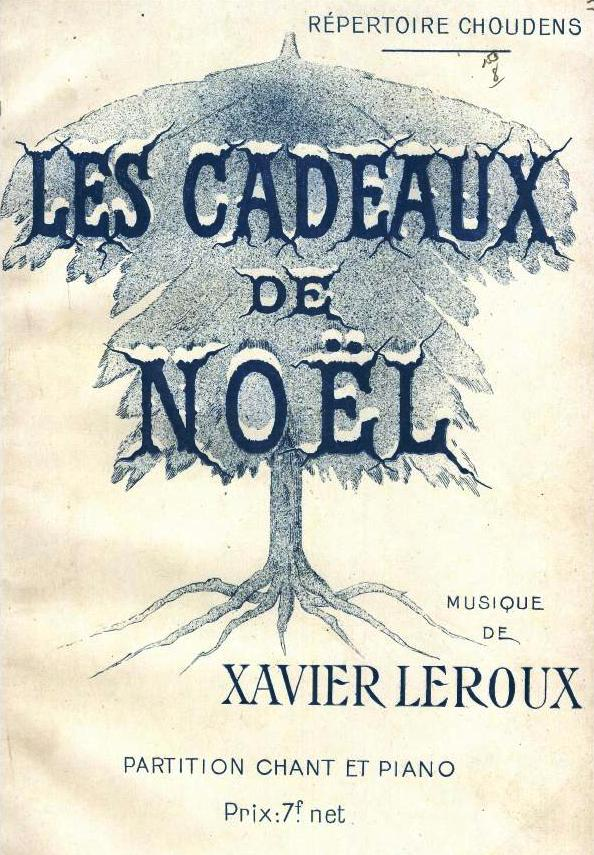
- Cover of the piano/vocal score published by Éditions Choudens in 1915
- Librettist: Émile Fabre
- Premiere: 25 December 1915; Salle Favart, Paris

Les cadeaux de Noël (The Christmas Gifts) is an opera in one act composed by Xavier Leroux to a French-language libretto by Émile Fabre. Described as a conte héroïque (heroic tale), it was premiered by the Opéra-Comique at the Salle Favart Theatre in Paris on Christmas Day 1915. Its story of four children, whose parents had been killed by German soldiers but who nevertheless found hope in a seemingly bleak Christmas, had a particular resonance with French audiences in the midst of World War I. The opera was a great success in Paris, and subsequently performed in Italy, Monte Carlo and Latin America.

== Background and performance history ==
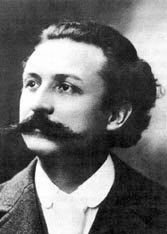
Xavier Leroux

The Opéra-Comique, one of France's most prosperous opera companies, was hard hit by the outbreak of World War I in the summer of 1914. By October, 127 of its musicians, singers, and staff had been mobilized to the Western Front. The threat to Paris by the advancing German army had also led to the closure of the city's theatres until December 1914, when the theatres were allowed to re-open for matinee performances. In the meantime, the company's conductor-in-chief, Paul Vidal, and the other directors had managed to reorganize and stabilize the company. In 1915, in addition to revivals of past successes, several new works were presented (often with a military or patriotic theme), including Les cadeaux de Noël. Its composer, Xavier Leroux, was well known on the Paris stages for his operas and theatre music. Three of his operas, La reine Fiammette (1903), Le chemineau (1907) and Le carillonneur (1913) had premiered at the Opéra-Comique. The libretto of Les cadeaux de Noël was written by the playwright Émile Fabre. In 1915 he became the general administrator of the Comédie-Française and founder of the Théâtre Aux Armées, a theatrical troupe which entertained French soldiers during the war.

Les cadeaux de Noël premiered at a matinee performance on 25 December 1915 in a double bill with Massenet's Werther. The premiere performance was conducted by Paul Vidal with an all-female cast, apart from the 50-year-old baritone Henri Albers, who played Père Jean. The production was directed by Pierre Chéreau with the staging designed by Alexandre Bailly and Pierre-Barthélemy Gheusi. Gheusi later recalled in his memoirs that the opera had been a triumph that left the entire audience in tears, adding:

The thrilling voice of Vallin (Clara), the radiant timbre of the young Saiman (little Pierre), the touching acting of Calas (Emma), Carrière (little Louis) and Albers (Père Jean), and the new sets designed by Bailly ensured a success for the work, with mothers scarred by the War sobbing in the back of the theatre. In the wings, the voice of my fine Messin Bello imitated the voice of the Boche with a fierce hatred that made all hearts tremble, but they were immediately relieved when little Pierre fired his avenging rifle.

The opera received glowing reviews from the critics in Le Figaro, Les Annales du théâtre et de la musique, and La Nouvelle revue for the poignancy and originality of Fabre's libretto and Leroux's charming, simple and emotive music. Described by Le Figaro in 1917 as having been a "vast success" in Paris, it was subsequently performed in 1917 at La Scala and the Teatro Costanzi in Italy with the same cast and at the Théâtre du Casino in Monte Carlo in a new production. In Latin America, it was performed in 1916 at the Teatro Solís in Montevideo and the Teatro Municipal in Rio de Janeiro, on both occasions conducted by the composer. According to Le Temps, a planned performance in Buenos Aires in 1916 was cancelled because the Argentine government feared it would offend the ambassadors from Germany and its allies.

The complete piano/vocal score of Les cadeaux de Noël was published by Éditions Choudens in 1915. Mathilde Saïman, who created the role of Pierre, recorded his aria "Air du petit Pierre" for Pathé Records in 1916.

== Roles ==
Roles, voice types, premier cast
Role	Voice type	Premiere cast, 25 December 1915 (Conductor: Paul Vidal)
Pierre	mezzo-soprano	Mathilde Saïman
Clara, Pierre's older sister	soprano	Ninon Vallin
Emma, Pierre's younger sister	soprano	Jeanne Calas
Louis, Pierre's younger brother	soprano	Germaine Carrière
Père Jean, an elderly neighbour	baritone	Henri Albers
German soldier (off-stage voice)	bass	Jean-François Bello

== Synopsis ==
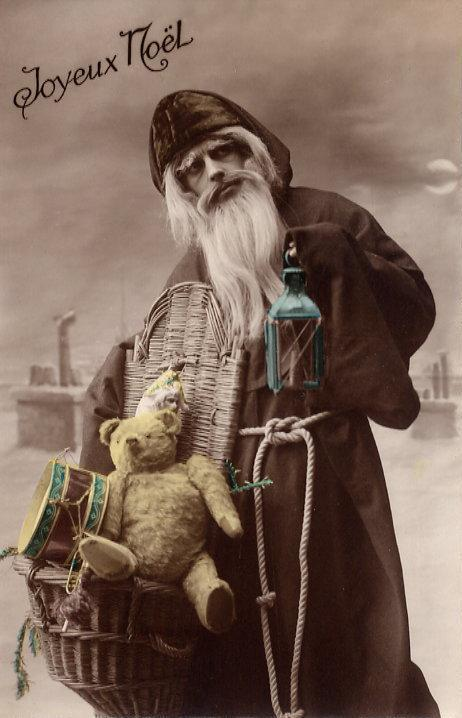
Père Noël depicted on a 1910 French postcard

Setting: A snow-covered French village during the first winter of World War I

Pierre and his brother and sisters are in the ruins of their family's farmhouse. It had been burnt down by advancing German soldiers who had also killed their parents. While their older sister Clara goes to the village in search of bread, Pierre, Louis and Emma, still believing that Père Noël will visit them on Christmas Eve, leave their shoes by the broken hearth in the hope that they will be filled with gifts the next morning. Clara returns and tells them that Père Noël will not come this year. The disappointed children begin to pray that this will not be so. Père John, an elderly neighbour whose daughter had been killed by the Germans, hears their sad prayer and arrives disguised as Père Noël.

He tells the three younger children that he has seen their parents in heaven and that he has brought gifts and messages from them. Emma receives dolls that she may prepare for the day when she marries and becomes a mother. Louis receives a trowel and a pickaxe that he may one day plant seeds in the field and rebuild their farm. Pierre receives a rifle with the message that he must never forget the innocent blood which has been spilled. Père Noël then tells them the final words from their parents: that they must love their sister Clara and each other and always live together in harmony as if they had one heart.

The children then sing in turns of their promise of fulfil their parents' wishes. As they sing, a German soldier comes upon them and orders Pierre to kneel on the ground. Instead, Pierre kills the soldier with his rifle. As the children are being pursued by German soldiers, Père Jean rescues them with his boat and hides them in a cave by the river.

== See also ==
- List of Christmas operas
