= René Rocher =

René Rocher (5 August 1890, in Paris – 24 June 1970) was a France stage actor and theater director.

In 1923, René Rocher gave its name to the current Comédie-Caumartin. He was managing director of the Théâtre Antoine from 1928 to 1933, then the Théâtre du Vieux-Colombier from 1935 to 1943, and the Théâtre de l'Odéon from 1940 to 1944.

== Theatre ==
=== Comedian ===
- 1913: Les Femmes savantes by Molière, directe by Irénée Manget, Théâtre des Arts
- 1914: Le destin est maître by Paul Hervieu, Théâtre de la Porte-Saint-Martin
- 1917: Les Noces d'argent by Paul Géraldy, Comédie-Française
- 1918: Lucrezia Borgia by Victor Hugo, Comédie-Française
- 1919: L'Hérodienne by Albert du Bois, Comédie-Française
- 1920: Hernani by Victor Hugo, Comédie-Française
- 1920: Maman Colibri by Henry Bataille, Comédie-Française
- 1922: L'Impromptu de Versailles by Molière, Comédie-Française
- 1929: L'Ennemie by André-Paul Antoine, mise en scène René Rocher, Théâtre Antoine
- 1933: Trois pour 100 by Roger Ferdinand, mise en scène Gabriel Signoret, Théâtre Antoine
- 1936: Elizabeth, la femme sans homme by André Josset, mise en scène René Rocher, Théâtre du Vieux-Colombier
- 1937: Les Borgia, famille étrange by André Josset, mise en scène René Rocher, Théâtre du Vieux-Colombier

=== Metteur en scène ===
- 1924: Le singe qui parle by René Fauchois, Comédie-Caumartin
- 1927: Ventôse by Jacques Deval, Comédie-Caumartin
- 1928: J'ai tué by Léopold Marchand, Théâtre Antoine
- 1928: Toi que j'ai tant aimée by Henri Jeanson, Comédie-Caumartin
- 1929: Le Pêcheur d'ombres by Jean Sarment, Comédie-Caumartin
- 1929: L'Ennemie by André-Paul Antoine, Théâtre Antoine
- 1930: Bobard by Jean Sarment, Théâtre Antoine
- 1930: La Petite Catherine, Théâtre Antoine
- 1935: Tartuffe ou l'Imposteur by Molière, Théâtre du Vieux-Colombier
- 1936: Elizabeth, la femme sans homme by André Josset, Théâtre du Vieux-Colombier
- 1937: Les Précieuses ridicules by Molière, Théâtre du Vieux-Colombier
- 1937: L'Appartement de Zoïka by Mikhaïl Boulgakov, Théâtre du Vieux-Colombier
- 1937: Les Borgia, famille étrange by André Josset, Théâtre du Vieux-Colombier
- 1938: Septembre by Constance Coline, Théâtre du Vieux-Colombier
- 1949: Les Amants d'Argos by Jean-Claude Eger, Théâtre Verlaine
- 1950: Mort pour rien by Alfred Fabre-Luce, Théâtre de l'Œuvre
- 1952: Enfant du miracle by Paul Gavault and Robert Charvay, Théâtre de l'Apollo
- 1955: La Monnaie de ses rêves by André Ransan, Théâtre du Grand-Guignol
- 1956: Je suis seule ce soir by André-Paul Antoine, Théâtre du Grand-Guignol
