= Macbeth (Bloch) =

Opera by Ernest Bloch

- Opera by Ernest Bloch
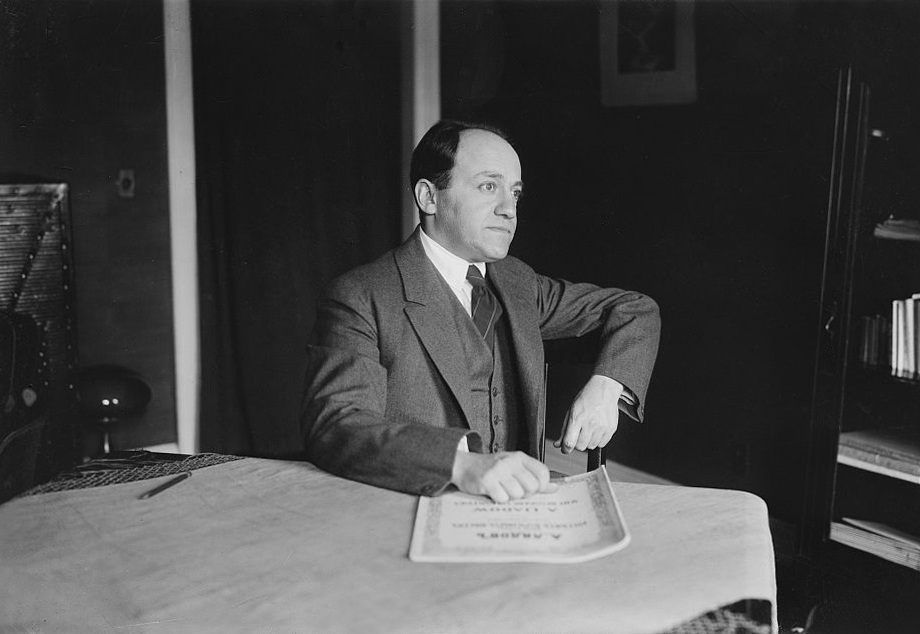
- The composer in 1917
- Librettist: Edmond Fleg
- Language: French
- Based on: Shakespeare's Macbeth
- Premiere: 30 November 1910; Opéra-Comique, Paris

Macbeth is an opera in three acts, with music by Ernest Bloch to a libretto by Edmond Fleg, after the eponymous play of William Shakespeare. Bloch composed the opera between 1904 and 1906, but it did not receive its first performance until 30 November 1910 by the Opéra-Comique in Paris with Henri Albers in the title role and conducted by François Ruhlmann. Alex Cohen has written of quarrels within the cast that contributed to the opera's poorly received premiere.

== Performance history ==
After the premiere, the opera was performed 15 times through January 1911, but then was withdrawn. Romain Rolland studied the score and communicated his admiration to Bloch in June 1911.

Guido M. Gatti has compared elements of Bloch's opera to the music of Modest Mussorgsky. He has also written of the different treatments of the Macbeth story by Giuseppe Verdi and Bloch in their respective operas on the subject, with Verdi being more "realistic" and Bloch being more in keeping with the symbolist era in art at his time.

After the premiere production, the opera was staged in 1938 in Naples, but was then banned on orders of the Fascist government. Subsequently, the opera was produced in Rome in 1953, and in Trieste.

The opera was staged, in English, at the Juilliard School of Music in New York under the direction of John Houseman, in May 1973. Peter Herman Adler conducted and the singers included L. Carlson, H. Barnsley, R. Termine, F. Burchinal, M. Li-Paz and W. White.

The University College Opera of University College, London, performed the English language premiere of Macbeth in the UK in March 2009.

The US premiere by a professional opera company was given by the Long Beach Opera in June 2013 in a production by Andreas Mitisek with Benjamin Makino conducting. That same production was staged by the Chicago Opera Theater in September 2014 with Francesco Milioto conducting.

The opera was staged, in the original French, at the Manhattan School of Music in December 2014 under the direction of Dona D. Vaughn with Laurent Pillot conducting.

== Roles ==
Role Type	Character	Voice type	Role creator
Major	Macbeth	Baritone	Henri Albers
Major	Lady Macbeth	Dramatic Soprano/ Mezzo-Soprano	Lucienne Bréval
Minor	1st Witch	Soprano	Espinasse
Minor	2nd Witch	Mezzo-Soprano	Suzanne Brohly
Minor	3rd Witch	Contralto	Marie Charbonnel
Minor	Banquo	Low Tenor	Jean Laure
Minor	Macduff	Lyric Bass	Félix Vieuille
Minor	Servant	Tenor	Robert Pasquier
Minor	Duncan	Tenor	Feodoroff
Minor	Porter	Baritone	Jean Delvoye
Minor	Lennox	Low Tenor	Raymond Gilles
Minor	Malcolm	Tenor	François Mario
Minor	Old man	Bass	Paul Payan
Minor	Murderer	bass	Louis Azéma
Minor	Lady Macduff	Soprano	Lucy Vauthrin
Minor	Son of Macduff	Mezzo-Soprano	Germaine Carrière
Minor	Third apparition	Contralto	Alive Raveau
Bit	First apparition	Bass	Paul Guillamat
mute	Fleance	-	Fayolle
mute	Second Murderer	-	
mute	Attendant	-	
mute	Eight Kings in Macbeth's vision	-	
Chorus	Lords, ladies, soldiers, peasants, ghosts.	various	

== Synopsis ==
The story is essentially that of the Shakespeare play, with the five acts compressed to three. The opera contains seven tableaux, with the prelude comprising the first tableau, and each of the three acts containing two tableaux.

== Recordings ==
Complete recordings conducted by Alexander Rumpf and Friedemann Layer have been produced.

A full recording of a performance in 1997 was issued in 1999 (Musicales Actes Sud OMA34100) with Jean-Philippe Lafont, Markella Hatziano, Jean-Philippe Marlière, Jacque Trussel, Christer Bladin, Philippe Georges, Marcel Vanaud, Sophie Fournier, Hanna Schaer, Ariane Stamboulides, Wojtek Smilek, Annie Varville, Franck Bard, Ferijs Millers, Andris Gailis; with the Orchestre Philharmonique de Montpellier Languedoc-Roussillon; Choeur de la Radio lettone; Friedemann Layer, conductor

A recording exists with Heinz Rehfuss as Macbeth and Lucienne Devallier as Lady Macbeth, with Ernest Ansermet conducting the Orchestre de la Suisse Romande.
