= Adolphe-Simonis Empis =

French dramatist

Adolphe-Dominique Florent Joseph Simonis, known as Empis, (29 March 1795, Paris – 11 December 1868, Paris) was a French dramatist.

== Biography ==
After studying at the lycée Impérial, Empis became master clerk in a notary's office. It was in this capacity that he happened to be at the home of the composer Spontini, who lived in Paris at that time. In search of inspiration, the musicien consulted Empis and declared himself charmed by his advice. Thus encouraged to launch himself down a new path, Empis wrote two booklets in collaboration, of which the second, Vendôme en Espagne, was set to music in 1823 by Herold and Auber. The following year, Empis began to write for the theatre and at the same time set forth on an administrative career, becoming at various times the secretary to the royal libraries, inspector of the crown house governing service, and ultimately head of the first division to the ministry of the royal house. His dramas and comedies made him worthy of election to the Académie française in 1847, and then to succeed Arsène Houssaye as administrateur général of the Théâtre-Français in 1856.

While certain of Empis' plays became fashionable, notably La Mère et la fille, which ran at the Théâtre de l'Odéon in 1830 with Frédérick Lemaître in the principal role, they were mostly attracted a cool critical reception and disdain from the public. After seeing Un Jeune Ménage at the Théâtre-Français in 1838, a theatre critic wrote in L'Artiste : "Nothing distinguishes this new drama from the other plays which Monsieur Empis has given to the theatre. It contains the same kind of intrigue and the same ideas. In a word, it is a work which without being absolutely bad, does not shine either with respect to inventiveness, nor characterization, nor style.. a mediocre work without bearing, which has no purpose but to reproduce scenes of daily life in all their common reality". Empis' plays never regained their popularity.

== Theatre ==
- Sapho, tragédie lyrique en 3 actes, Paris, Académie royale de musique, 12 August 1818
- Vendôme en Espagne, drame lyrique en 1 acte, Paris, Académie royale de musique, December 1823
- Bothwell, drame historique en 5 actes et en prose, Paris, Comédie-Française, 21 June 1824
- L'Agiotage, ou le Métier à la mode, comédie en 5 actes et en prose, Paris, Théâtre-Français, 25 July 1826
- Lambert Simnel, ou le Mannequin politique, comédie en 5 actes et en prose, Paris, Théâtre-Français, 24 March 1827
- La Mère et la fille, comédie en 5 actes et en prose, Paris, Théâtre de l'Odéon, 11 October 1830
- La Dame et la demoiselle, comédie en 4 actes et en prose, Paris, Théâtre-Français, 14 October 1830
- Un Changement de ministère, comédie en 5 actes et en prose, Paris, Théâtre de l'Odéon, 12 March 1831
- Une Liaison, comédie en 5 actes et en prose, Paris, Théâtre-Français, 21 April 1834
- Lord Novart, comédie en 5 actes et en prose, Paris, Théâtre-Français, 27 February 1836
- Julie, ou Une séparation, comédie en 5 actes et en prose, Paris, Théâtre-Français, 2 May 1837
- Un Jeune Ménage, drame en 5 actes et en prose, Paris, Théâtre-Français, 6 September 1838
- Théâtre (2 volumes, 1840)
- L'Héritière, ou Un coup de partie, comédie en 5 actes et en prose, Paris, Théâtre-Français, 4 September 1844
- L'Ingénue à la cour, comédie en 5 actes, Paris, Théâtre de l'Odéon, 20 mars 1846
- Les Six Femmes de Henri VIII, scènes historiques (2 volumes, 1854) Online text 1 2
