= Pierre Louis-Calixte =

French actor (1967–2025)

- Born: November 1967
- Died: 12 August 2025 (aged 57)
- Occupation: Actor

Pierre Louis-Calixte (November 1967 – 12 August 2025) was a French actor.

== Life and career ==
Louis-Calixte joined the Comédie-Française on 21 September 2006 and became a sociétaire on 1 January 2013.

Louis-Calixte died of cancer on 12 August 2025, at the age of 57.

== Filmography ==
=== Film ===
- Des lendemains qui chantent (1996)
- Petite Chérie (2000)
- The Mechanics of Women (2000)
- That Old Dream That Moves (2001)
- Blonde et Brune (2005)
- Voici venu le temps (2005)
- La Part animale (2007)
- The Refuge (2009)
- Bad Girl (2012)

=== Television ===
- Le Bourgeois gentilhomme (telefilm) (2009)
- It's Only the End of the World (2009)
