= List of administrators of the Comédie-Française =

The following is a list of administrators of the Comédie-Française, from 1799, date of the merger between the Théâtre de la Nation and the Théâtre de la République.

From	To	Name	Title and notes
7 February 1799	June 1806	Jean-François-René Mahérault (1764–1833)	government commissioner of the Théâtre de la République
June 1806	June 1806	Nicolas Bernard	provisional imperial commissioner during the illness of Mahérault
June 1806	3 February 1813	Jean-François-René Mahérault	imperial commissioner
3 February 1813	11 June 1814	Nicolas Bernard	imperial commissioner
24 March 1815	28 June 1815	Nicolas Bernard	imperial commissioner during the Hundred Days
1821	9 July 1825	François Chéron (1764–1829)	government commissioner
9 July 1825	27 July 1830	I.-J.-S., baron Taylor (1789–1879)	government commissioner of the Théâtre-Français until the July Revolution
11 July 1827	July 1830	Hyacinthe Albertin (died in 1840)	royal commissioner by interim
24 September 1830	5 April 1831	E.-J.-E. Mazères (1796–1886)	provisional royal commissioner
6 April 1831	17 October 1838	Isidore-Justin-Séverin, baron Taylor	royal commissioner
8 June 1833	31 July 1837	Armand-François Jouslin de La Salle (1797–1863)	director-manager
28 January 1837	17 October 1838	Hygin-Auguste Cavé (1794–1852)	royal commissioner by interim
1 March 1837	8 March 1840	Alexandre-Louis Poulet, dit Vedel (1783–1873)	director-manager
17 October 1838	29 August 1847	François Buloz (1803–1877)	royal commissioner
29 August 1847	2 March 1848	François Buloz	administrator
2 March 1848	11 October 1848	J.-Ph. Simon, known as Lockroy (1803–1895)	provisional commissioner of the Théâtre de la République
20 October 1848	15 November 1849	Eugène Bazenerye	provisional commissioner of the Théâtre de la République
13 October 1848	15 November 1849	Sébastien Edmond, dit Sevestre (1799–1852)	manager general taking on the function of administrator
15 November 1849	27 April 1850	Arsène Housset, dit Houssaye (1815–1896)	government commissioner of the Théâtre-Français
27 April 1850	29 January 1856	Arsène Housset, dit Houssaye	administrator of the Théâtre de la République, then of the Théâtre-Français (resigned)
30 January 1856	21 October 1859	Adolphe Simonis, dit Empis (1795–1868)	administrator general
22 October 1859	8 July 1871	Édouard Thierry (1813–1894)	general administrator
8 July 1871	8 October 1885	Émile-César-Victor Perrin (1814–1885)	general administrator
30 May 1885	20 October 1885	Albert Kaempfen (1826–1907)	provisional administrator
20 October 1885	23 December 1913	Jules Claretie (1840–1913)	general administrator
1 January 1914	au 30 November 1915	Albert Carré (1852–1938)	general administrator
2 December 1915	15 October 1918	Émile Fabre (1869–1955)	general administrator "for the duration of war"
15 October 1918	15 October 1936	Émile Fabre	general administrator
3 February 1934	3 February 1934	Georges-Paul-Maurice Thome	general administrator (does not take on the functions)
15 October 1936	27 December 1940	Édouard Bourdet (1887–1945)	general administrator
15 May 1940	27 December 1940	Jacques Copeau (1879–1949)	general administrator by interim
27 December 1940	7 January 1941	Jacques Copeau	general administrator (resigned)
13 January 1941	7 March 1941	Léon Lamblin	government commissioner
4 March 1941	23 March 1944	Jean-Louis Vaudoyer (1883–1963)	general administrator (resigned)
24 March 1944	28 July 1944	André Brunot (1879–1973)	provisional general administrator
July 1944	July 1944	Jean Sarment (1897–1976)	general administrator (does not take on the functions)
1 September 1944	1 July 1945	Pierre Dux (1908–1990)	general administrator (resigned)
1 July 1945	début October 1945	Joseph Denis, dit Denis d'Inès (1885–1968)	general administrator by interim
October 1945	6 April 1946	André Obey (1892–1975)	provisional general administrator
6 April 1946	5 February 1947	André Obey	general administrator (resigned)
5 April 1947	5 April 1953	Pierre-Aimé Touchard (1903–1987)	general administrator
5 April 1953	5 April 1959	Pierre Descaves (1896–1966)	general administrator
20 April 1959	30 January 1960	Claude Bréart de Boisanger (1899–1999)	general administrator
1 June 1960	31 July 1970	Maurice Escande (1892–1973)	general administrator
1 August 1970	31 July 1979	Pierre Dux	general administrator
1 September 1979	31 July 1983	Jacques Toja (1929–1996)	general administrator
1 August 1983	31 July 1986	Jean-Pierre Vincent	general administrator
1 August 1986	March 1988	Jean Le Poulain (1924–1988)	general administrator
1 April 1988	15 June 1988	Claude Winter	dean by interim
15 June 1988	30 April 1990	Antoine Vitez (1930–1990)	general administrator
1 May 1990	5 July 1990	Catherine Samie	dean by interim
15 July 1990	5 August 1993	Jacques Lassalle	general administrator
5 August 1993	3 August 2001	Jean-Pierre Miquel	general administrator
4 August 2001	3 August 2006	Marcel Bozonnet	general administrator
4 August 2006	3 August 2014	Muriel Mayette	general administrator
4 August 2014	3 August 2025	Éric Ruf	general administrator
4 August 2025		Clément Hervieu-Léger	general administrator

== See also ==
- Sociétaires of the Comédie-Française

== Sources ==
- (in French) Site of the Comédie-Française
