= Claude Bréart de Boisanger =

French diplomat

Claude Bréart de Boisanger (25 October 1899 – 7 September 1999) was a French diplomat. General administrator of the Comédie-Française from 1959 to 1960, he also was Yves Bréart de Boisanger's brother.

== Biography ==
After graduation, he chose a diplomatic career. He was named General consul of France at San Francisco in 1941, then was attached to the governor-General of French Indochina, admiral Jean Decoux, to manage relationships between Indochina and the Pacific countries. He was a member of the Conciliation Commission for Palestine in 1949 and in charge of American affairs in 1951, before he was promoted to the post of Ambassador of France in Czechoslovakia from 1953 to 1959.

Claude de Boisanger was general administrator of the Comédie-Française from April 1959 to January 1960. His appointment was very unpopular with the world of theater and André Malraux finally terminated his functions. Boisanger, who committed no misconduct, seized the Conseil d'État which canceled the decree for abuse of power. Malraux then signed a new decree which was again canceled by the Conseil d'État. Boisanger requested his retirement with regard to the situation. In 1964 he published his memoirs.

== Works ==
- Neuf mois a la Comédie-Française (Nouvelles Éditions latines, 1964)
- On pouvait éviter la guerre d'Indochine : souvenirs 1941-1945 (foreword by M. Jacques Chastenet, Paris, A. Maisonneuve, 1977)
- Vivre en Russie au temps de la N.E.P. (Librairie d'Amérique et d'Orient J Maisonneuve, 1981)
