= Mathilde Saïman =

French opera singer (1891–1940)

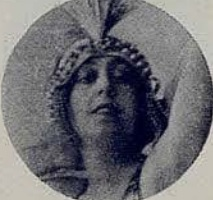
Mathilde Saiman Portrait

Mathilde Alice Saïman (9 December 1891–September 1940) was a French opera singer active in the Opéra-Comique during first half of the 20th century where she sang both soprano and mezzo-soprano roles.

Saïman was born in Algiers to French parents and studied at the Paris Conservatory where she won the first prize in singing. She made her debut on 21 March 1914 at the Opéra-Comique in Charpentier's Louise as one of the grisettes and a month later appeared in her first major role there, Jeanne in Godard's La vivandière. She sang Pierre in the world premiere of Leroux's Les cadeaux de Noël (1915) and Lélia in the French premiere of Messager's Béatrice (1917). Her other roles at the Opéra-Comique included revivals of Madame Butterfly (Kate and Cio-Cio San), Cavalleria rusticana (Lola and Santuzza), Les Contes d'Hoffmann (Giulietta and Antonia), and La bohème (Musetta).

In his memoirs Pierre-Barthélemy Gheusi, one of the directors of the Opéra-Comique, described her as a "vibrant actress" whose voice had a "radiant timbre". Saiman made several recordings for Pathé Records in 1916. She died in Paris at the age of 48.
