= Jeanne Ludwig =

French actress

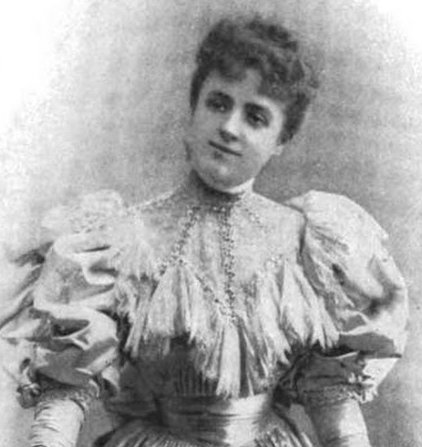
- Jeanne Ludwig, from an 1896 publication.
- Born: 25 October 1867
- Died: 27 June 1898 (aged 30); Paris, France
- Other names: Jeanne-Clarisse-Victoire Ludwig
- Occupation: actress
- Years active: 1887-1898
- Known for: Sociétaire, Comédie-Française

Jeanne-Clarisse-Victoire Ludwig (October 25, 1867 – June 27, 1898) was a French actress and sociétaire of the Comédie-Française.

== Early life ==
Ludwig studied at the Conservatoire de Paris under actor Louis-Arsène Delaunay. While there, she won first prize in comedy.

== Career ==
Ludwig debuted as a pensionnaire with the Comédie-Française in 1887, in Pierre de Marivaux's Le Jeu de l'amour et du hasard (The Game of Love and Chance). Other shows with Ludwig in the cast were Le Mariage de Figaro (1890), Thermidor by Victorien Sardou (1891 and 1892), Grisélidis (1891), Rosalinde (1891), and Les Trois Sultanes (1892). She appeared in London's Drury Lane with the troupe in 1889 and in 1893, in Frou-Frou, Adrienne, Ruy Blas, and especially in Le Monde ou l'On s'ennuie by Édouard Pailleron. On the last of these, an English reviewer commented, "who was to suppose that Mdlle. Ludwig, whom we had found fairly acceptable on Saturday, Monday, and Tuesday in little parts ... was going to astonish us all on Wednesday in Samary's part, playing so brightly, so girlishly, so drolly, that one gave no heed to the memories of her brilliant forerunner. Mdlle. Ludwig made, beyond a doubt, the hit of the evening."

In 1893 Ludwig was elected a sociétaire (full member) of the Comédie-Française. Her last role was as "Musette" in an adaptation of La Vie de Bohème.

== Personal life ==
Ludwig died from tuberculosis in 1898, aged 30 years, and is buried at Père Lachaise Cemetery.
