= Comédie-Caumartin =

Theatre in Paris, France

- Comédie royale, Théâtre d'essai de la chanson
- Interactive map of Comédie-Caumartin
- Address: 25 rue de Caumartin; Paris; France
- Coordinates: 48.871628°N 2.32816°E
- Capacity: 380
- Type: Theatre

Construction
- Opened: 1901

Website
- www.comedie-caumartin.com

The Comédie-Caumartin (French pronunciation: [kɔmedi komaʁtɛ̃]) is a 380-seat capacity theatre located at 25 rue de Caumartin in the 9th arrondissement of Paris.

== Histoire ==
Inaugurated in 1901 under the name Comédie-Royale, the venue is dedicated to humour and particularly to plays belonging to the boulevard genre. In 1923, René Rocher gave its current name to the place.

In February 1958 the Theatre became Théâtre d'essai de la chanson. Pierre Dac and Francis Blanche played in the Chipolata 58 show

The famous play Boeing-Boeing by Marc Camoletti was premiered in this theatre on 10 December 1960 and performed here until 1980 before it was moved to the théâtre Michel. Since then, it has been performed about everywhere in the world
