= Jules Truffier =

French stage actor

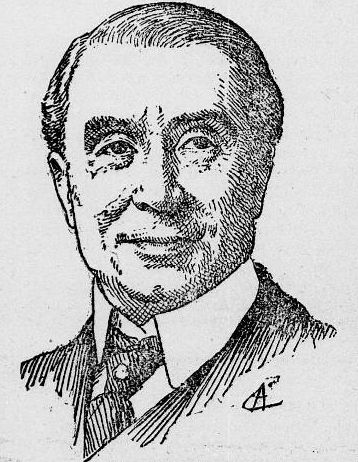
Portrait of Jules Truffier in 1914

Jules-Charles Truffier (1856 - 3 December 1943) was a French stage actor.

After he performed for a while at the Théâtre de l'Odéon, in 1875 Truffier was admitted in the Comédie-Française where he made his debut in Tabarin, before he became the 319th sociétaire in 1888. Named an honorary sociétaire in 1922, he also was a professor at the Conservatoire de Paris.

== Theatre (very short selection) ==
=== Outside the Comédie-Française ===
- 1875 : Un drame sous Philippe II by Georges de Porto-Riche, Théâtre de l'Odéon
