= Lon Robbé =

Dutch painter and photographer

Lon Robbé (born 1946) is a Dutch painter and photographer, best known for her painting Bedroom 1989 (1989). Her work is a part of the permanent collections of the Teylers Museum, Museum Arnhem, Museum De Lakenhal, and Stedelijk Museum Amsterdam, among others.
