= Marie Léopold-Lacour =

French feminist activist, journalist and playwright

Marie Leopold-Lacour
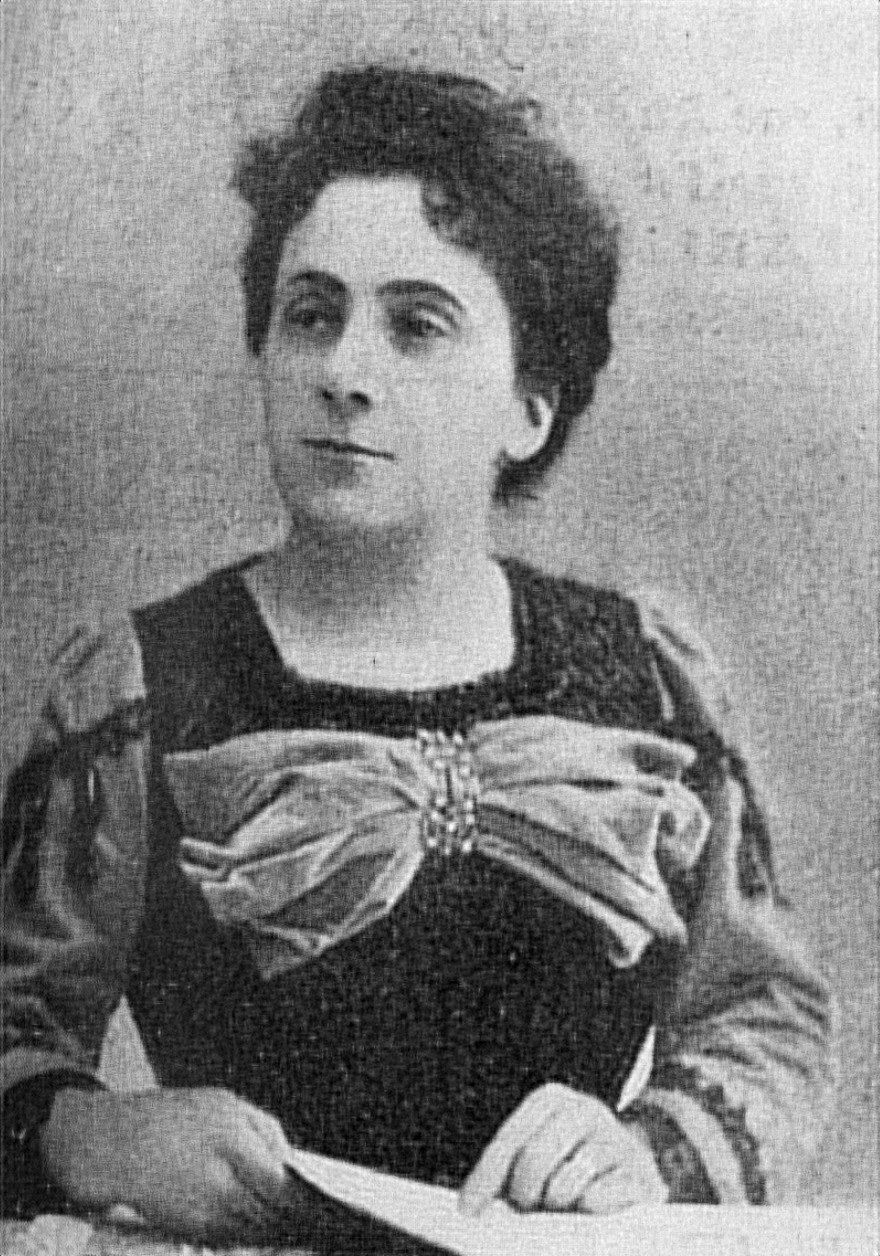
- Léopold-Lacour in 1908
- Born: Marie-Rachel Jourdan; 6 January 1859; Royan, France
- Died: 5 December 1942 (aged 83); Neuilly-sur-Seine, France
- Occupations: feminist activist; journalist; playwright; poet; storyteller
- Writing career
- Language: French
- Genres: opera libretto; pantomime; plays; sketches; non-fiction articles

Marie Léopold-Lacour (née, Jourdan; also known as Mary Léopold Lacour; 6 January 1859 - 5 December 1942) was a French feminist activist, journalist, playwright, poet, and storyteller. She was a champion of mixed-gender schools. Lacour died in 1942.

== Biography ==
Marie-Rachel Jourdan was born 6 January 1859, in Royan. She contributed to feminist journals such as La Fronde, founded by Marguerite Durand.

Wife of the feminist writer Léopold Lacour, she shared his passion for mixed-gender education. She spoke at the International Congress of Women of 1896, in Paris, chaired by Marie Bonnevial, describing the state of mixed-gender schools in Europe, and responding to the arguments of their opponents.

In Literature (Harper and Brothers, 1898), Léopold-Lacour's name was included on a list of potential members if an Academy of Ladies was formed in Paris, several meetings already having been held to deliberate on the scheme. She participated in the planning committee of the "Condition et Droits" Congress, September 1900.

Mary Leopold-Lacour died 5 December 1942, in Neuilly-sur-Seine.

== Selected works ==
=== Opera libretto ===
- Vlasta, opera libretto, with Mrs. Paul Poirson
- Sylvain et Gaël, comic opera libretto, with Mrs. Paul Poirson

=== Pantomime ===
- L'Héritage de Pierrot, pantomime in 2 acts, performed in Paris, at the Théâtre de l'Application (Les Escholiers), 20 May 1892
- Le Rendez-vous ou Plus fort que la mort, pantomime, (Les Escholiers), c. 1895-1896
- Les Morts aimés, pantomime, (Les Escholiers) c. 1895-1896
- Nuit d'hyménée !, pantomime, (Les Escholiers), c. 1895-1896
- Don Juan aux enfers, ballet-pantomime in 1 act, music by Henri José, performed at the Casino de Paris, 29 November 1897
- La Chambre des aïeux, pantomime in 1 act, 10 scenes, published in Les Saisons, autumn 1921

=== Plays ===
- Un pauvre bûcheron, play in 1 act, published in La Pensée sur la Côte d'Azur, ca. 1923, and performed in Paris, at the Odéon-Théâtre de l'Europe, 20 December 1923

=== Sketches ===
- La Sérénade inutile, sketch published in La Pensée sur la Côte d'Azur, ca. 1929

=== Articles ===
- Mary Leopold Lacour, "Madame Gabrielle Réval", Femina, 1 October 1903, p. 685.
