= Adrien Decourcelle =

French writer and playwright

- Born: 28 October 1821; Montdidier (Somme)
- Died: 6 August 1892 (aged 70); Étretat (Seine-Maritime)
- Occupations: Playwright, chansonnier
- Spouse: Caroline Lambert

Adrien Decourcelle (28 October 1821 – 6 August 1892) was a 19th-century French writer and playwright.

Pierre-Henri-Adrien Decourcelle wrote about 70 plays between 1845 and 1855, comedies and Comédie en vaudeville written most of the time in collaboration with Théodore Barrière. He was also a successful chansonnier.

In 1851 he married Caroline Lambert, a niece of Adolphe d'Ennery. His son was Pierre Decourcelle (1856-1926), a playwright, novelist, president of the Société des gens de lettres and commandeur of the Légion d'honneur. Pierre Decourcelle was involved in legal disputes following Ennery's death in 1899.

Adrien Decourcelle is buried at Père Lachaise Cemetery in the 20th arrondissement of Paris (7th division).

== Selected works ==
- 1848: Un vilain monsieur, play with Théodore Barrière, Théâtre des Variétés
- 1850: Les Petits Moyens, play with Eugène Labiche and Gustave Lemoine, Théâtre du Gymnase
- 1895: La Belle Épicière, operetta with Henri Kéroul, music by Louis Varney, Théâtre des Bouffes-Parisiens

== Distinctions ==
- Chevalier of the Légion d'honneur

== Bibliography ==
- Domenico Gabrielli, Dictionnaire historique du cimetière du Père-Lachaise (XVIIIe – XIXe siècles), Paris, éd. de l'Amateur, 2002, p. 110.
- Revue d'art dramatique, tome 27, 1892, (p. 248).
