= Émile Fabre =

French playwright (1869–1955)

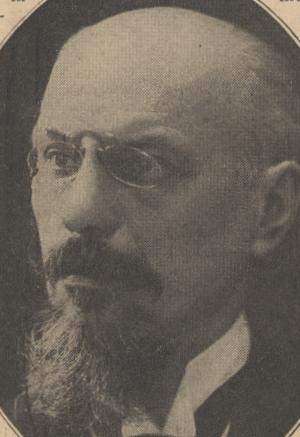
- Émile Fabre in 1917
- Born: 24 March 1869; Metz, France
- Died: 25 September 1955 (aged 86); Paris, France

Émile Fabre (24 March 1869 in Metz, France – 25 September 1955 in Paris) was a French playwright and general administrator of the Comédie-Française from 1915 to

1936.^{:227} He was greatly influenced by Balzac as a young man, and most of his best-known plays deal with the sacrifice of personal happiness to the pursuit of wealth. He also wrote the libretto for Xavier Leroux's opera Les cadeaux de Noël (The Christmas Gifts) which was a great success when it premiered in Paris in 1915.

== Career at the Comédie-Française ==
Fabre was appointed general administrator of the Comédie-Française on 2 December 1915.^{:227} According to Susan McCready,

During Fabre's tenure, the Comédie-Française moved from the center of the theatre scene, where theatrical creation and innovation are paramount, to its periphery, where [ . . . ] its role was increasingly limited to the preservation of the past.^{:2}

In 1922 he organised the Cycle Molière, in which all of Molière's plays were performed in chronological order.^{:231}

The success of this event, encouraged him to organise the Centennial of Romanticism in 1927, the 100-year anniversary of Victor Hugo's Preface de Cromwell (Qe Waleffe).^{:232} Over the course of the Centennial the theatre staged twenty-one Romantic plays.

He resigned from the position 15 October 1936.^{:227}

== Plays ==
Fabre's plays include:

- L'Argent (Money), 1895
- La Vie publique (Public Life), 1901
- Les Ventres dorés (Gilded Stomachs), 1905
- Les Sauterelles (The Locusts), 1911
