= Maurice Donnay =

French dramatist

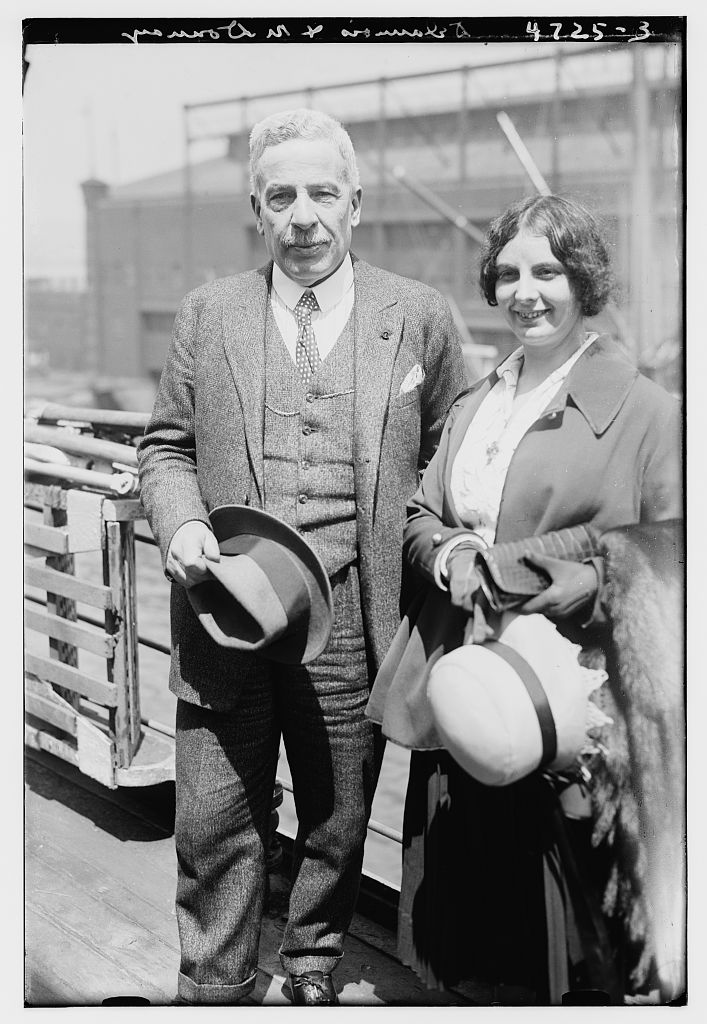
Donnay and Delamios in 1918

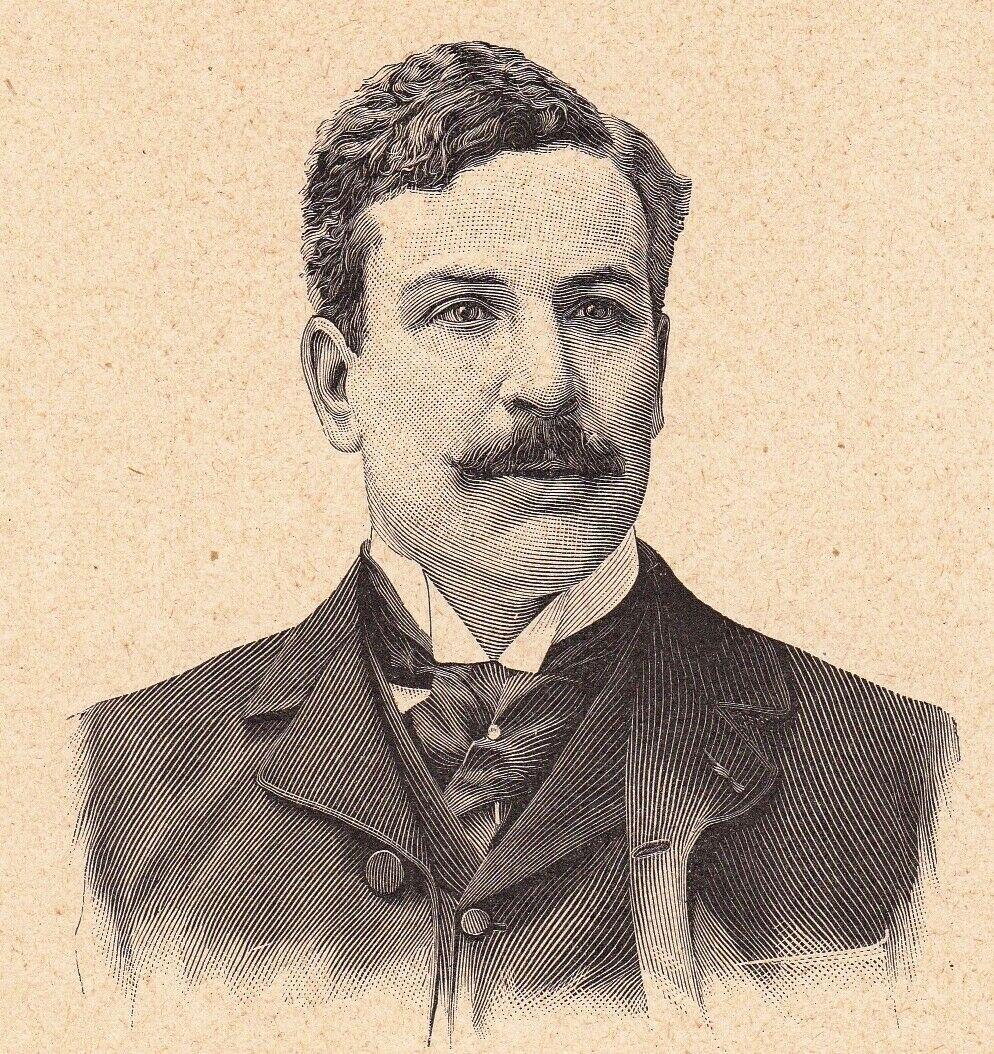
Charles Maurice Donnay.

Charles Maurice Donnay (12 October 1859 – 31 March 1945) was a French dramatist.

== Biography ==
Donnay was born of middle-class parents in Paris in 1859. His father was a railway engineer and initially Donnay followed a similar profession, studying at the École centrale des arts et manufactures in 1882.

With Alphonse Allais, Donnay started by writing material for the celebrated cabaret le Chat noir.

Donnay made his serious debut as a dramatist on the little stage of Le Chat Noir with Phryne (1891), a series of Greek scenes. This was followed by Lysistrata, a four-act comedy, was produced at the Grand Théâtre in 1892 with Gabrielle Réjane in the title part. With Amants in 1895 he won a great success, and the play was hailed by Jules Lemaître as the Bérénice of contemporary French drama. It was the first work of a series called Théâtre d'Amour. His plays were performed by famous actors including Cécile Sorel, Réjane et Lucien Guitry. They showed what was at the time advanced ideas on the relationship between the sexes, and used everyday language in their dialogue.

On 14 February 1907, Donnay was elected a member of the Académie française; he replaced Albert Sorel.

== Works ==
Donnay's plays included:

- Phryné (1891)
- Lysistrata (1892), in collaboration with Maurice Leblanc (Act II, scene 7. However, Donnay would not admit it.)
- Folle Entreprise (1894)
- Pension de famille (1894)
- Complices (1895), in collaboration with M. Groselande
- Amants (1895), produced at the Renaissance theatre with Mme Jeanne Granier as Claudine Rozeray
- La Douloureuse (1897)
- L'Affranchie (1898)
- Georgette Lemeunier (1898)
- Le Torrent (1899), at the Comédie Française
- Éducation de prince (1900)
- La Clairière (1900)
- Oiseaux de passage (1904), in collaboration with Lucien Descaves
- La Bascule (1901)
- L'Autre danger, at the Comédie Française (1902)
- Le Retour de Jérusalem (1903)
- L'Escalade (1904)
- Paraître (1906) Comédie-Française with Berthe Cerny as Christiane Margès
- Le Ménage de Molière (1912)
- Les Éclaireuses (1913)
- L'Impromptu de Paquetage (1916)
- Le Théâtre aux armées (1916)

He also published some wartime essays and addresses:

- La Parisienne et la Guerre (1916)
- Premières Impressions après (1917)
- Lettres à la Dame Blanche (1917)
- Pendant qu'ils sent à Noyon (1917)
- La Chasse à l'Homme (1919)
