= Pierre Decourcelle =

French writer and playwright (1856–1926)

- Born: Pierre Adrien Decourcelle; 25 January 1856; Paris, France
- Died: 10 October 1926 (aged 70); Paris, France
- Occupations: Writer and playwright

Pierre Adrien Decourcelle (Paris, 25 January 1856 – Ibid., 10 October 1926) was a French writer and playwright.

== Life ==
Pierre Adrien Decourcelle was born in Paris on 25 January 1856. His father, Adrien Decourcelle, and his uncle, Adolphe d'Ennery, were both authors. He attended the Lycée Henri-IV in Paris, and then worked as a merchant and stockbroker before starting to write plays.

Decourcelle's first effort, Le Grain de beauté (The Beauty Mark) premiered at the Théâtre du Gymnase Marie Bell on 27 March 1880. In 1882 he wrote the drama L'As de trèfle (The Ace of Clubs) for Sarah Bernhardt, who performed it at the Théâtre de l'Ambigu. From the 1880s onward he created many comedies, opera libretti and adaptations of novels for the stage. Decourcelle and Léopold Lacour made a play from Paul Bourget's Mensonges, which was first performed on 18 April 1889. Bourget also collaborated with Decourcelle in their adaptation of Idylle tragique for the stage. In October 1897 Decourcelle's French version of William Gillette's play Secret Service was performed by the Théâtre Renaissance in Paris.

Decourcelle also worked as a journalist for Le Gaulois under the pseudonyms "Choufleuri" and "Valentin". He was a prolific author, turning out cheap novels for the juvenile market. Decourcelle's romans revanchards became popular. These were nationalistic and conservative novels that called for revenge for the loss of Alsace-Lorraine in the Franco-Prussian War of 1870. His novel Les Deux Gosses (1880) was his most successful. It was adapted for the cinema by several directors.

In 1908 Decourcelle founded a company to adapt literary works to the screen, with Eugène Guggenheim. The Société des Auteurs et des Gens de Lettres (SCAGL) became respected for the quality of its productions. Three American serials starring Pearl White were recut and re-arranged into a series called Les Mystères de New-York for French cinemas, screened in Paris between December 1915 and May 1916. While episodes of the silent ciné-roman series were being played in the theaters each week, Decourcelle's versions of the stories were published by Le Matin and the provincial papers. In 1921 SCAGL produced an adaptation by André Antoine of Émile Zola's La Terre. The depiction of brutalist morals in a farming environment were toned down considerably for the screen version.

Pierre Decourcelle died on 10 October 1926 at the age of 70.

== Works ==
=== Theater ===
- Le Grain de beauté (The Beauty Mark), comedy in one act, Paris, Théâtre du Gymnase Marie Bell, 27 March 1880
- L'As de trèfle (The Ace of Clubs), drama in five acts, Paris, Théâtre de l'Ambigu, 15 March 1883
- Le Fond du sac (The Bottom of the Bag), comedy in three acts, Paris, Théâtre du Palais-Royal, 24 March 1883
- La Danseuse au couvent (The Dancer at the convent), comedy in one act, Paris, Théâtre du Gymnase-Dramatique, 23 September 1883
- La Charbonnière (The Charcoal maker) drama in five acts, collaboration with Hector Crémieux, Théâtre de la Gaîté (rue Papin), 31 January 1884
- L'As de trèfle (The Ace of Clubs), drama in five acts and nine tableaux, Paris, Théâtre de l'Ambigu, 15 March 1883
- La Buveuse de larmes (The Drinker of Tears) (1885)
- Le Mariage à la course (Marriage on the run), skit in one act, 1886
- Les Cinq doigts de Birouk (The Five Fingers of Birouk), drama in five acts, seven tableaux, Paris, Théâtre de Paris, 18 December 1886
- L'Abbé Constantin (The Abbé Constantin), comedy in three acts, in collaboration with Hector Crémieux, after the novel by Ludovic Halévy, Paris, Théâtre du Gymnase, 4 November 1887
- Madame Cartouche, comic opera in three acts, in collaboration with William Busnach, music by Léon Vasseur, Paris, Théâtre des Folies-Dramatiques, 19 October 1886
- Le Dragon de la reine (The queen's dragon), comic opera in three acts, in collaboration with Frantz Beauvallet, music by Léopold de Wenzel, Paris, Théâtre de la Gaîté (rue Papin), 31 March 1888
- Mensonges (Lies), comedy in for acts and five tableaux, in collaboration with Léopold Lacour, after the novel by Paul Bourget, Paris, Théâtre du Vaudeville, 18 April 1889
- Gigolette, drama in one prolog, five acts and eight tableaux, in collaboration with Edmond Tarbé des Sablons, Paris, Théâtre de l'Ambigu, 25 November 1893
- Le Collier de la reine, play in five acts and 13 tableaux, Paris, 31 January 1895, Théâtre de la Porte Saint-Martin,
- Après le pardon (After the pardon) by Mathilde Sérao and Pierre Decourcelle, Théâtre Réjane, 1907
- Le Roy sans royaume (The King without a kingdom), historical mystery in three parts and seven tableaux, Théâtre de la Porte Saint-Martin, 23 September 1909
- La Rue du Sentier, comedy in four acts by Pierre Decourcelle and André Maurel, Théâtre de l'Odéon, 16 April 1913

=== Novels and stories ===
- Le Chapeau gris (Grey Hat) (1886-1887), novel
- Les Deux Gosses (The two kids) (1880), novel illustrated by H. Meyer, Jonnard, and others, in 3 volumes, published in Paris by Éditions Rouff. Later adapted to the theatre and the cinema.
- Fanfan, second volume of Les Deux Gosses (1891)
- La Chambre d'amour (1892)
- Mam'zelle Misère (Miss Misery) (1892)
- Brune et blonde (Brunette and Blonde) (1893)
- Crime de femme (Crime of Woman) (1895)
- Gigolette, novel derived from his play, La librairie illustrée, Paris, 1895
- La Baillonnée (The gagged one), novel in four parts, c. 1904
- Les Mystères de New-York (The Mysteries of New York) - Les Romans-Cinémas, éditions Renaissance du Livre
- Les Fêtards de Paris (Revelers of the Paris)
- Le Curé du Moulin-Rouge (The priest of the Moulin Rouge)

== Film adaptations ==
Decourcelle's Les Deux Gosses (The Two Kids) was adapted as a film by several directors.

- Les Deux Gosses - Épisode 1: La faute d'une mère (Episode 1: The lack of a mother) (1912) directed by Adrien Caillard
- Les Deux Gosses - Épisode 2: Fanfan et Claudinet (Episode 2: Fanfan and Claudinet) (1912) directed by Adrien Caillard
- Les Deux Gosses (1916) directed by Adrien Caillard
- Les Deux Gosses (1916) directed by Albert Capellani
- Les Deux gosses (1923) directed by Maurice Tourneur
- Les Deux Gosses (1924) directed by Louis Mercanton
- Les Deux Gosses (1936) directed by Fernand Rivers
- I due derelitti (1951: Italian) directed by Flavio Calzavara
