= Georges de Porto-Riche =

French dramatist and novelist (1849–1930)

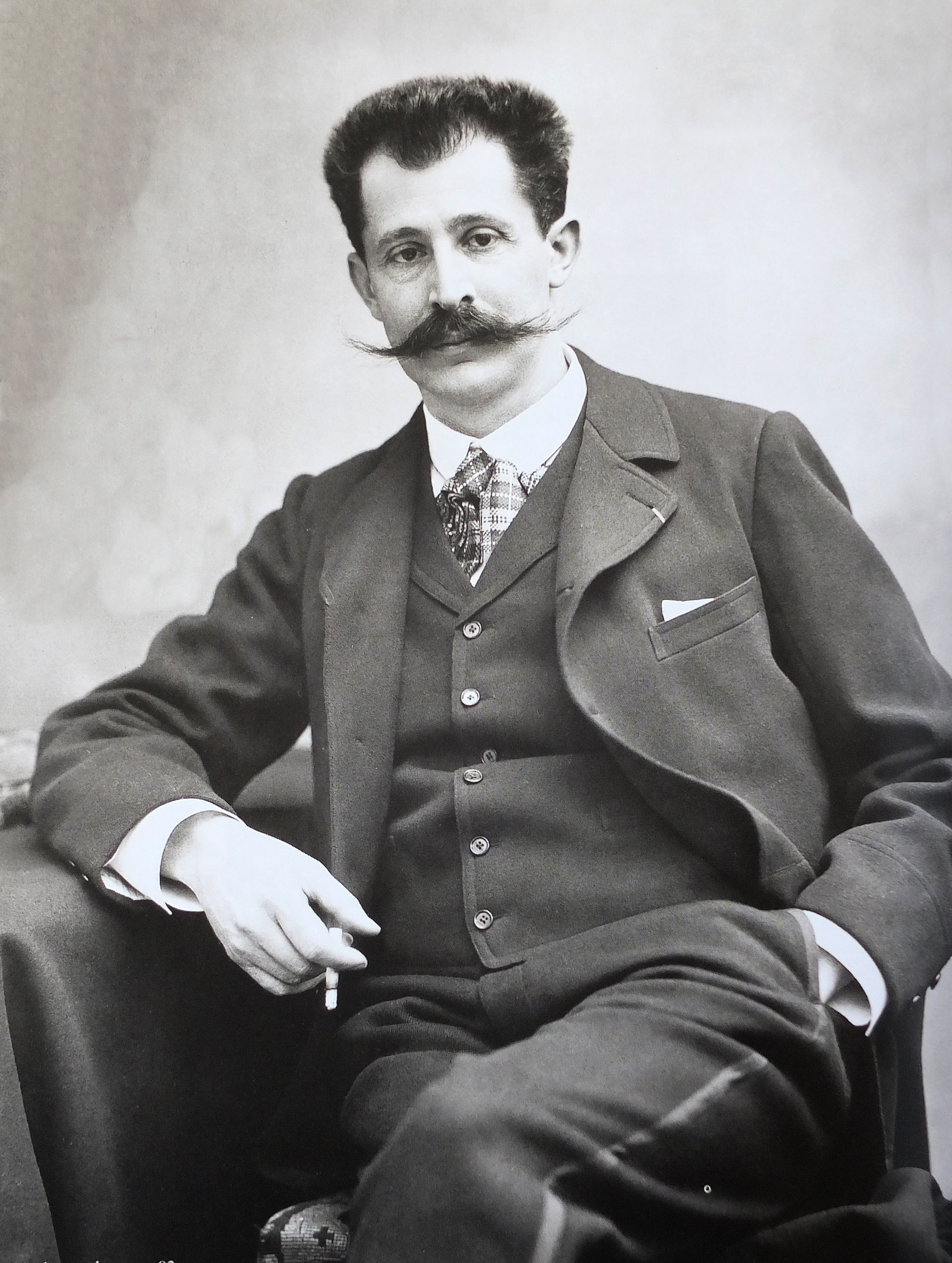
Georges de Porto-Riche in 1895

Georges de Porto-Riche (20 May 1849, Bordeaux, Gironde – 5 September 1930, Paris) was a French dramatist and novelist.

== Biography ==
Georges was born into a Jewish-Italian assimilated family.

At the age of twenty, his pieces in verse began to be produced at the Parisian theatres; he also wrote some books of verse which met with a favorable reception, but these early works were not reprinted. In Germaine, the passionate and exacting heroine of Amoureuse, Mme Réjane found one of her best parts.

In 1898 he published Théâtre d'amour, which contained four of his most celebrated pieces: La Chance de Françoise, L'Infidèle, Amoureuse, and Le Passé. The title given to this collection indicates the difference between the plays of Porto-Riche, which focus on human emotion and psychological drama, and the political or sociological pieces of many of his contemporaries. Even in Les Malefilâtres (Odéon, 1904), whose characters are drawn from the working class, love remains the central focus.

He was elected to the 6th seat of the Académie Française in 1923. However, he was never officially received to the Académie, because the reading committee found the eulogy he wrote for his predecessor unsatisfactory, and he refused to rewrite it. Porto-Riche was also named a Grand officier in the Legion of Honour.

He died in 1930 and was buried in the churchyard of Saint Valery in Varengeville-sur-Mer, Normandy.

== Works ==
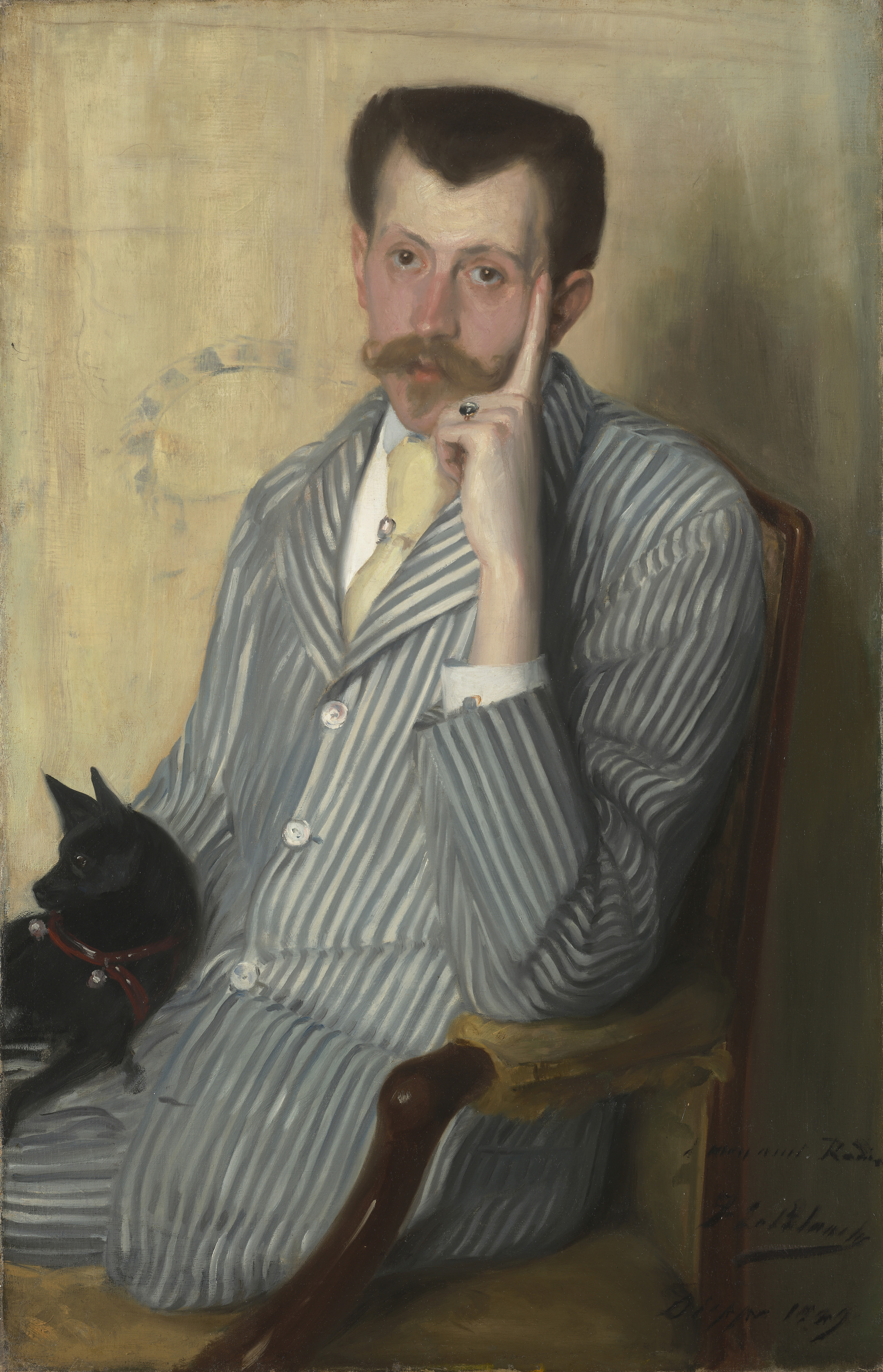

- 1872: Primo Verba, poems
- 1873: Le Vertige, comedy in 1 act and in verse, Paris, Odéon, 27 June
- 1874: Pommes d'Ève (1874)
- 1875: Un drame sous Philippe II, drama in four acts and in verse, Paris, Odéon, 14 April
- 1877: Tout n'est pas rose, poems (1877)
- 1878: Les Deux Fautes, one-act comedy, Odéon, 18 December
- 1878: Vanina, fantaisie vénitienne in 2 parts and in verse
- 1888: La Chance de Françoise, one-act comedy, in prose
- 1889: Bonheur manqué, carnet d'un amoureux
- 1890: L'Infidèle, comedy in 1 act and in verse, music by Francis Thomé, Paris, Théâtre d'Application, 19 April
- 1891: Amoureuse, three-act comedy, Odéon, 25 April
- 1897: Le Passé, five-act comedy, Odéon, 30 December; reduced to 4 acts at the revival at the Théâtre-Français in 1902.
- 1904: Les Malefilâtre, two-act comedy, Théâtre de la Renaissance, 28 April
- 1911: Le Vieil homme, five-act play, Paris, Renaissance, 12 January
- 1912: Zubiri, fantasy in 1 act drawn from a story by Victor Hugo in Choses vues, Paris, Comédie royale, 1 February
- 1915: Quelques vers d'autrefois
- 1918: Le Marchand d'estampes, three-act drama
- 1920: Anatomie sentimentale, pages préférées
- 1923: Veux-tu que je sois ta femme ?, short story
- 1927: Sous mes yeux
- 1929: Les Vrais Dieux, fantaisie antique in 2 parts, Paris, Théâtre Albert Ier, 22 November

== Bibliography ==
- Henry Marx : Georges de Porto-Riche, son œuvre, La Nouvelle Revue Critique, Paris, 1924
- Wolfgang Asholt: Gesellschaftskritisches Theater im Frankreich der Belle epoque (1887–1914) (Studia Romanica; 59). Verlag, Winter, Heidelberg 1984. ISBN 3-533-03548-4 (zugl. Habilitationsschrift, Universität Münster 1983).
- Hermann Bahr: Glossen zum Wiener Thewater (1903–1906). S. Fischer, Berlin 1907.
- Hendrik Brugmans: Georges de Porto-Riche. Sa vie, son oeuvre. Droz, Paris 1934.
- Arthur Eloesser: Literarische Portraits aus dem modernen Frankreich. S. Fischer, Berlin 1904.
- W. Müller: Georges de Porto-Riche. Vrin Paris 1934.
