= Jacques Robbe =

French engineer, geographer, and playwright

Jacques Robbe (1643–1721) was a French engineer and geographer. He also wrote plays under the pseudonym Barquebois.

== Life ==
Born in Soissons, Province of Picardy. Robbe was educated as a lawyer. He became royal geographer, publishing a treatise on geography in 1678, which was translated into Turkish by Petros Baronian, the interpreter for the Dutch embassy in Istanbul.

Robbe died in Paris in 1721.

== Works ==
- Methode pour apprendre facilement la geographie: dediée a monseigneur le duc du Mayne, 2 vols., 1678
- (as M. de Barqubois) La rapinière, ou l'interessé: comédie, 1683
- La femme testvë, ou, Le medecin Holandois: comedie, 1686
- Les hazards du jeu de l'hombre, 1700
