= François de Curel =

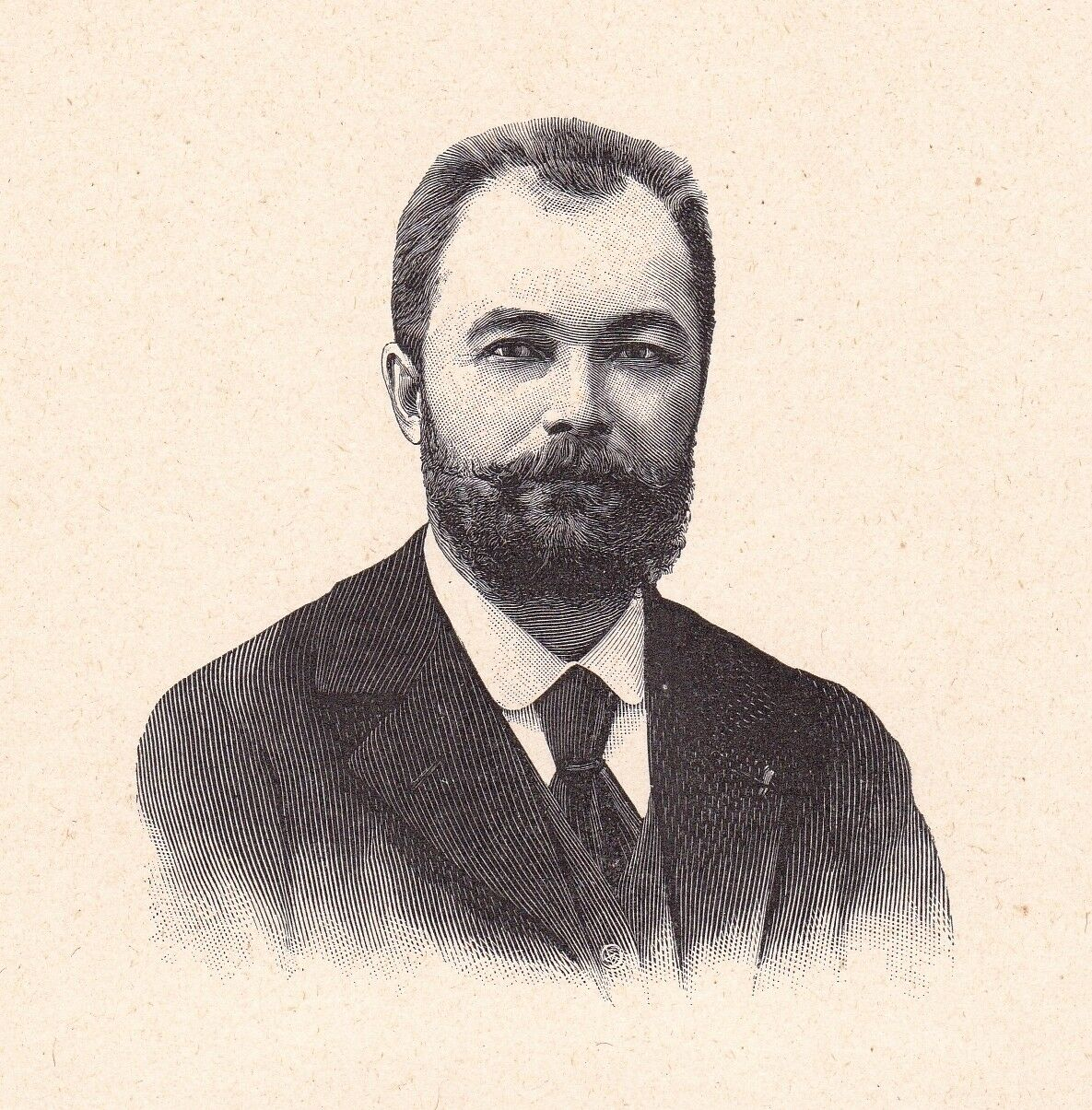
François, Vicomte de Curel.

François, vicomte de Curel (10 June 1854 – 26 April 1928), French dramatist, was born at Metz, Moselle.

== Biography ==
He was educated at the École centrale Paris as a civil engineer, the family wealth being derived from smelting works. He began his literary career with two novels, L'Ete des fruits secs (1885) and Le Sauvetage du grand duc (1889). In 1891 three plays were accepted by the Théâtre Libre.

== Bibliography ==
- L'Envers d'une sainte (1892)
- Les Fossiles (1892), a picture of the prejudices of the provincial nobility
- L'Invitée (1893), the story of a mother who returns to her children after twenty years' separation
- L'Amour brode (1893), which was withdrawn by the author from the Théâtre Français after the second representation
- La Figurante (1896)
- Le Repas du lion (1898), dealing with the relations between capital and labour
- La Fille sauvage (1902), the history of the development of the religious idea
- La Nouvelle Idole (1899), dealing with the worship of science
- Le Coup d'aile (1906)

See also Contemporary Review for August 1903.
