= Madame Sans-Gêne =

Madame Sans-Gêne may refer to:

- Marie-Thérèse Figueur (1774–1861), French female soldier
- Catherine Hübscher (1753–1835), wife of Marshal of France François Joseph Lefebvre, whose life has been dramatised in:
  - Madame Sans-Gêne (play), an 1893 play by Victorien Sardou and Émile Moreau
  - Madame Sans-Gêne (opera), a 1915 opera by Umberto Giordano
  - Madame Sans-Gêne (1911 film), starring Gabrielle Réjane
  - Madame Sans-Gêne (1925 film), starring Gloria Swanson
  - Madame Sans-Gêne (1941 film), by Roger Richebé
  - Madame Sans-Gêne (1945 film), featuring José Maurer
  - Madame Sans-Gêne (1961 film), starring Sophia Loren

== See also ==
- Monsieur Sans-Gêne, a 1935 French romantic comedy film by Karl Anton
