= Julien Bertheau =

French actor (1910–1995)

- Born: 19 June 1910
- Died: 28 October 1995 (aged 85)
- Citizenship: Algeria
- Occupation: Actor

Julien Bertheau (19 June 1910 – 28 October 1995) was a French actor.

== Biography ==
Born in Algiers, Algeria, before making his debut at the Comédie-Française on 18 December 1936, he worked as manager of the Theatre de la Porte Saint-Martin, then he studied with Charles Dullin at the Atelier Theatre, appeared in plays at the Comédie des Champs-Elysées and finally worked with Louis Jouvet. He left the Comédie-Française after twenty-two years.

In 1961, he starred in Madame Sans-Gene opposite Sophia Loren. Bertheau was one of the favorite actors of Luis Buñuel, appearing in his Cela s'appelle l'aurore (1955), playing a maitre d'hotel in La Voie lactée (1969), a bishop in Le Charme discret de la bourgeoisie (1972) and a policeman in Le Fantôme de la liberté (1974).

Bertheau died in Nice in 1995. His son, Alain Bertheau, was also a notable stage actor.

== Comédie-Française ==
- Fortunio, Le Chandelier, Alfred de Musset, with Gaston Baty, 18 December 1936 (debut)
- Clitandre, Le Misanthrope, Molière, 1° January 1937
- Lord Kingston, Chatterton,, Alfred de Vigny, 7 & 14 January 1937 = 2 fois
- Éraste, Le Dépit amoureux, Molière, 15 January 1937
- Cléante, Le Malade imaginaire, Molière, 15 January 1937
- Le jeune malade, Le Jeune Malade, André Chénier, 23 January 1937, matinée poétique
- Damis, Tartuffe, Molière, 1° March 1937
- Mario, Le Jeu de l'amour et du hasard, Marivaux, 2 March 1937
- Henri, Le Peintre exigeant, Tristan Bernard, 15 March 1937
- Vinaigre, Madame Sans Gêne, Victorien Sardou & Émile Moreau, 1° April 1937
- Silvio, À quoi rêvent les jeunes filles ?, Alfred de Musset, 5 April 1937
- Gaston, Les Corbeaux, Henry Becque, 21 April 1937
- Un nécessaire, L'Impromptu de Versailles, Molière, 24 May 1937
- Le receveur, Le Simoun, Henri-René Lenormand, with Gaston Baty, 22 June 1937, première
- Augustin Fontanet, Le Vieil Homme, Georges de Porto-Riche, 1° September 1937
- Léandre, Les Fourberies de Scapin, Molière, 9 September 1937
- Britannicus, Britannicus, Racine, 23 September 1937 – 1942 = 11 fois
- Un maître de danse, Il ne faut jurer de rien, Alfred de Musset, nouvelle présentation, 5 October 1937
- Filinte, Les Fâcheux, Molière, 4 November 1937
- Lucidor, L'Épreuve, Marivaux, 19 November 1937; reprise 8 April 1948
- Cléante, L’Avare, Molière, 29 November 1937 – 27 September 1945
- Vicomte de Saussy, La Marche nuptiale, Henry Bataille, 6 December 1937
- Arlequin, Arlequin poli par l'amour, Marivaux, 16 December 1937
- Pierrot II, Les Deux Pierrot, Edmond Rostand, 18 December 1937
- Horace, L’École des femwith, Molière, 30 December 1937
- André Pain, La Brouille, Charles Vildrac, 18 January 1938
- Julien Cicandel, L'anglais tel qu'on le parle, Tristan Bernard, 27 January 1938
- Le Lieutenant de gendarmerie, La Robe rouge, Eugène Brieux, 1 °February 1938
- Saint-Marchan, Madame Sans Gêne, Victorien Sardou & Émile Moreau, 4 February 1938
- Don Mathias, Hernani, Victor Hugo, 10 February 1938
- Lubin, Les Fausses Confidences, Marivaux, with Pierre Dux, 20 February 1938
- d’Orbel, Le Veuf, Carmontelle, 24 February 1938 – 1956
- Dautier, Un ami de jeunesse, Edmond Sée, 24 March 1938
- Armand, La Navette, Henry Becque, 29 March 1938
- Azor, La Dispute, Marivaux, with Jean Martinelli, 25 April 1938
- le fils, L'Âge ingrat, Jean Desbordes, 25 April 1938
- Le comte d’Albe, Ruy Blas, Victor Hugo, with Pierre Dux, 23 May 1938
- Leroy, Madame Sans Gêne, Victorien Sardou & Émile Moreau, 30 July 1938
- Montazgo, Ruy Blas, Victor Hugo, with Pierre Dux, 1938; reprise 7 December 1944
- Thomas Diafoirus, Le Malade imaginaire, Molière, 19 September 1938
- le Ramoneur, Tricolore, Pierre Lestringuez, with Louis Jouvet, 13 October 1938
- Arlequin, La Surprise de l'amour, Marivaux, 21 November 1938
- de Valvert, Cyrano de Bergerac, Edmond Rostand, with Pierre Dux, 19 December 1938
- d'Arques, Les Trois Henry, André Lang, 21 March 1939
- Farizet, L'Indiscret, Edmond Sée, 17 April 1939
- Judas, A souffert sous Ponce-Pilate, Paul Raynal, with René Alexandre, 26 April 1939; reprise 9 March 1947
- l'appelé des jeunes classes, L'Offrande, Gaston Sorbets, 3 June 1939
- Le Poète, La Nuit d'October, Alfred de Musset, 7 November 1940
- Valentin, La Nuit des Rois ou ce que vous voudrez, William Shakespeare, with Jacques Copeau, 23 December 1940
- Léandre, Le Médecin malgré lui, Molière, 23 January 1941
- Jeppo Liveretto, Lucrèce Borgia, Victor Hugo, 1^{er} March 1941
- Le poète, La Nuit de May, Alfred de Musset, 17 March 1941
- Sem, Noé, André Obey, 31 March 1941
- Damien, André del Sarto, Alfred de Musset, with Jean Debucourt, 19 May 1941
- La Grange, Les Précieuses ridicules, Molière, 23 May 1941
- Antonio, Le Chant du Berceau, Gregorio & Martinez Sierra, 25 May 1941
- Fantasio, Fantasio, Alfred de Musset, with Pierre Bertin, puis 11 July 1941
- un jeune homme, Madame Quinze, Jean Sarment, 17 July 1941
- Valère, Le Médecin volant, Molière, with Fernand Ledoux, 29 October 1941
- Horatio, Hamlet, William Shakespeare/Guy de Pourtalès, with Charles Granval, 16 March 1942
- Annibal Desiderio, Les Marrons du feu, Alfred de Musset, with Jean Martinelli, 27 April 1942
- Montmeyran, Le Gendre de Monsieur Poirier, Émile Augier & Jules Sandeau, 4 July 1942
- Don Pedro, La Reine morte, Henry de Montherlant, with Pierre Dux, 8 December 1942
- André, Boubouroche, Georges Courteline, 19 May 1943
- Gringoire, Gringoire, Théodore de Banville, 12 September 1943*
- le chinois, The Satin Slipper, Paul Claudel, with Jean-Louis Barrault, 27 November 1943
- Monsieur Robert, La Poudre aux yeux, Eugène Labiche, with Jean Meyer, 24 February 1944
- Tertius Doctor, cérémonie du Le Malade imaginaire, Molière, with Jean Meyer, 28 October 1944
- Molière, L'Impromptu de Versailles, Molière, with Pierre Dux, 28 October 1944
- Ulric, Barberine, Alfred de Musset, with Jean Meyer, 10 December 1944
- Guy Duval-Lavallée, Les Fiancés du Havre, Armand Salacrou, with Pierre Dux, 16 December 1944; reprise (Salle Luxembourg) 21 November 1946
- Dorante, Le Légataire universel, Régnard, with Pierre Dux, 24 February 1945
- Alain, Les Mal-aimés, François Mauriac, with Jean-Louis Barrault, 1° March 1945
- Philon, Antoine et Cléopâtre, William Shakespeare/André Gide, with Jean-Louis Barrault, 30 April 1945
- Ventidius, Antoine et Cléopâtre, William Shakespeare/André Gide, with Jean-Louis Barrault, 30 April 1945
- Scarus, Antoine et Cléopâtre, William Shakespeare/André Gide, with Jean-Louis Barrault, 30 April 1945
- Daniel Savary, Le Voyage de monsieur Perrichon, Eugène Labiche and Édouard Martin, with Jean Meyer, 31 January 1946
- Joseph, Feu la mère de madame, Georges Feydeau, 16 February 1946
- Narcisse, Britannicus, Racine, reprise with Jean Marais, 4 March 1946 – 19 September 1954 = 84 fois
- Dorante, Le Jeu de l'amour et du hasard, Marivaux, 17 October 1946
- Sanine, Le Tourbillon, Bernard Zimmer, with Jean Meyer, Salle Luxembourg, 11 December 1946
- Perdican, On ne badine pas avec l'amour, Alfred de Musset, 11 January 1947
- Néron, Britannicus, Racine, 29 January au 9 December 1947 5 fois
- Le Chevalier, Les Sourires inutiles, Marcel Achard 4 February 1947
- Georges, La Brebis, Edmond Sée, 2 July 1947
- Chatterton, Chatterton, Alfred de Vigny, 30 October 1947 – 25 January 1948 = 15 fois
- Lorenzo, La Peine capitale, Claude-André Puget, Salle Luxembourg, 3 March 1948
- Tulle, Horace, Pierre Corneille, with Jean Debucourt, 8 April 1948
- Le cardeur de laine, La Peine capitale, Claude-André Puget, Salle Luxembourg, 3 October 1948
- Bob Laroche, Les Temps difficiles, Édouard Bourdet, with Pierre Dux, 22 December 1948
- Maurice, Le Plaisir de rompre, Jules Renard, 25 June 1949
- Alvar Gonçalvès, La Reine morte, Henry de Montherlant, with Pierre Dux, 15 November 1949
- Don Juan, L'Homme de cendres, André Obey, with Pierre Dux, 22 December 1949, au Théâtre de l'Odéon
- Valère, Le Médecin malgré lui, Molière, Le Caire, 18 March 1950
- Le prince, La Double inconstance, Marivaux, with Jacques Charon, 19 September 1950
- Frédéri, L’Arlésienne, Alphonse Daudet, 23 December 1950
- Le Visiteur, Un voisin sait tout, Gérard Bauër, 11 March 1951
- Lambert Laudisi, Chacun sa vérité, Luigi Pirandello, d'après Charles Dullin, 14 March 1951
- le Temps, Un conte d'hiver, William Shakespeare/Claude-André Puget, 18 March 1951
- Lui, L'Homme que j'ai tué, Maurice Rostand, 30 May 1951
- le Chœur, Antigone, Sophocles/Bonnard, 19 June 1951
- Le petit brun, Donogoo, Jules RoMayns, with Jean Meyer, 9 November 1951
- Grussgott, Le Veau gras, Bernard Zimmer, 16 November 1951
- Un officier du palais, Œdipe roi, Sophocle/Thierry Maulnier, 14 May 1952
- Le cardinal, La Peine capitale, Claude-André Puget, 12 June 1952
- Mercutio, Roméo et Juliette, William Shakespeare/Jean Sarment, 22 October 1952
- Jacques, Comme il vous plaira, William Shakespeare/Jules Supervielle, with Jacques Charon, 1951–52
- Le poète, La Nuit d’October, Alfred de Musset, 1951–52
- Le Chœur, Pasiphaé, Henry de Montherlant, 25 February 1953
- Ulysse, Une Fille pour du vent, André Obey, 15 April 1953
- Ulric, Les Noces de deuil, Philippe Hériat, 15 October 1953
- Octave, Les Caprices de Marianne, Alfred de Musset, 9 December 1953
- le prologue, Prométhée enchaîné, Eschyle/Jean de Beer, Festival de Lyon Charbonnières, 18 au 21 June 1954
- Trielle, La Paix chez soi, Georges Courteline, 18 September 1954
- Charles, Le Pavillon des enfants, Jean Sarment, 24 May 1955
- Le Comte Almaviva, Le Mariage de Figaro, Beaumarchais, with Jean Meyer, 14 February 1957
- Acaste, Polydora, André Gillois, 7 March 1957

=== Director ===
- 1943: La Légende du Chevalier (by André de Peretti Della Roca)
- 1945: Le Pèlerin (by Charles Vildrac)
- 1946: Britannicus (by Racine)
- 1947: On ne badine pas avec l'amour (by Alfred de Musset)
- 1948: La Peine capitale (by Claude-André Puget)
- 1950: The Winter's Tale (by William Shakespeare)
- 1950: L'Arlésienne (by Alphonse Daudet)
- 1951: Chacun sa vérité (by Luigi Pirandello, mise en scène d'après Charles Dullin)
- 1951: L'Homme que j'ai tué (by Maurice Rostand)
- 1951: Le Veau gras (by Bernard Zimmer)
- 1952: Six personnages en quête d'auteur (by Luigi Pirandello)
- 1952: Romeo and Juliet (by William Shakespeare)
- 1952: Oedipus Rex (by Sophocles)
- 1952: Le Cid (by Pierre Corneille)
- 1953: Bérénice (by Racine, Théâtre des Célestins)
- 1953: Pasiphaé (by Henry de Montherlant)
- 1953: Une fille pour du vent (by André Obey)
- 1953: Les Noces de deuil (by Philippe Hériat)
- 1954: En attendant l'aurore (by Madame Simone)
- 1954: Fantasio (by Alfred de Musset)
- 1955: Le Pavillon des enfants (by Jean Sarment)
- 1955: L’Annonce faite à Marie (by Paul Claudel)

== Outside Comédie-Française ==
=== Actor ===
- 1928: Le Carnaval de l'amour (by Charles Méré, mise en scène Émile Couvelaine, Théâtre de la Porte Saint-Martin)
- 1930: Patchouli (by Armand Salacrou, mise en scène Charles Dullin, Théâtre de l'Atelier)
- 1931: Atlas-Hôtel (by Armand Salacrou, mise en scène Charles Dullin, Théâtre de l'Atelier)
- 1931: La Prochaine ? (by André-Paul Antoine, Théâtre Antoine)
- 1934: Les Races (by Ferdinand Bruckner, mise en scène Raymond Rouleau, Théâtre de l'Œuvre)
- 1934: Un roi, deux dames et un valet (by François Porche, Comédie des Champs-Elysées)
- 1935: Noix de coco (by Marcel Achard, mise en scène Raimu, Théâtre de Paris)
- 1935: Les Retours imprévus (by Edmond Sée)
- 1936: L'École des femmes (by Molière, mise en scène Louis Jouvet, Théâtre de l'Athénée)
- 1948: Jardin français (dialogues by Albert Husson, mise en scène Julien Bertheau, Théâtre des Célestins)
- 1959: Tête d'or (by Paul Claudel, mise en scène Jean-Louis Barrault, Odéon-Théâtre de France)
- 1961: Antigone (by Jean Anouilh, mise en scène André Barsacq, Vienne)
- 1961: L'Impromptu des collines (by Albert Husson, mise en scène Julien Bertheau, Théâtre du Tertre, Théâtre des Célestins)
- 1961: Claude de Lyon (by Albert Husson, mise en scène Julien Bertheau, Théâtre du Tertre, Théâtre des Célestins)
- 1963: Le Neveu de Rameau (by Denis Diderot, mise en scène Jacques-Henri Duval, Théâtre de l'Œuvre, Théâtre de la Michodière)
- 1966: L'Idée fixe (by Paul Valéry, mise en scène Pierre Franck, Théâtre de la Michodière)
- 1969: La Tour d'Einstein (by Christian Liger, mise en scène avec Pierre Fresnay, Théâtre royal du Parc, Théâtre de la Michodière)
- 1970: L'Idée fixe (de Paul Valéry, mise en scène Pierre Franck, Théâtre de la Michodière)
- 1971: Mon Faust (by Paul Valéry, mise en scène Pierre Franck, Théâtre de la Michodière)
- 1975: Othon (by Corneille, mise en scène Jean-Pierre Miquel, Théâtre national de l'Odéon)
- 1975: Les Secrets de la Comédie humaine (by Félicien Marceau, mise en scène Paul-Emile Deiber, Théâtre du Palais Royal)
- 1981: Le Neveu de Rameau (by Denis Diderot, mise en scène Jacques-Henri Duval, Petit Odéon)

=== Director ===
- 1945: Rouge et or (by Charles de Peyret-Chappuis, Théâtre La Bruyère)
- 1945: Judith (by Charles de Peyret-Chappuis, Théâtre Hébertot)
- 1946: La Putain respectueuse (by Jean-Paul Sartre, Théâtre Antoine)
- 1947: La Parisienne (by Henry Becque, Théâtre des Mathurins)
- 1948: Jardin français (dialogues by Albert Husson, Théâtre des Célestins)
- 1957: Le Cœur volant (by Claude-André Puget, Théâtre Antoine)
- 1961: Claude de Lyon (by Albert Husson, Théâtre du Tertre)
- 1961: L'Impromptu des collines (by Albert Husson, Théâtre du Tertre)
- 1963: Cinna (by Pierre Corneille, Théâtre de l'Ambigu)
- 1964: Anthony and Cleopatra (by William Shakespeare, Festival de Carthage)
- 1964: les Mal aimés de François Mauriac, mise en scène Julien Bertheau avec Jacques Dumesnil, assistant charles Tordjman: Théâtre de Lille.
- 1971: Dumas le magnifique (by Alain Decaux, Théâtre du Palais Royal)
- 1977: Hamlet (by William Shakespeare, Théâtre des Célestins)

== Filmography ==
=== Film ===
- 1929: The Crime of Sylvestre Bonnard (directed by André Berthomieu)
- 1930: Little Lise (directed by Jean Grémillon) - André
- 1932: Barranco, Ltd (directed by André Berthomieu) - Gérard Fortiolis
- 1935: Pasteur (directed by Sacha Guitry) - Un élève (uncredited)
- 1936: La vie est à nous (directed by Jean Renoir, Jacques Becker, Jean-Paul Le Chanois et André Zwoboda) - René - l'ouvrier en chômage / The unemployed
- 1942: La Symphonie fantastique directed by Christian-Jaque) - Victor Hugo (uncredited)
- 1942: Etoiles de demain (Short, directed by René Guy-Grand) - Narrator (voice)
- 1942: Hommage à Georges Bizet (Short, directed by Louis Cuny)
- 1943: La Cavalcade des heures (directed by Yvan Noé) - Récitant (voice)
- 1943: Un seul amour (directed by Pierre Blanchar) - James de Poulay
- 1943: The White Waltz (directed by Jean Stelli) - Bernard Lampré
- 1944: Carmen (directed by Christian-Jaque) - Lucas, le matador / Lucas, il matador
- 1946: Raboliot (directed by Jacques Daroy) - Pierre Fouques dit Raboliot
- 1946: Patrie (directed by Louis Daquin) - Le prince Guillaume d'Orange
- 1946: Comédie avant Molière (Short, directed by Jean Tedesco)
- 1950: La montagne est verte (Short, directed by Jean Lehérissey) - Commentator (voice)
- 1951: Serenade to the Executioner (directed by Jean Stelli) - Lorenzi
- 1953: Bernard de Clairvaux (Short, directed by Pierre Zimmer) - Récitant / Narrator (voice)
- 1954: La Commune (Documentary Short, directed by Robert Ménégoz) - L'empereur Napoléon I
- 1954: Le Comte de Monte-Cristo (directed by Robert Vernay) - L'empereur Napoléon I
- 1954: Émile Zola (Short documentary, directed by Jean Vidal) - Récitant / Narrator (voice)
- 1955: Lord Rogue (directed by André Haguet) - Le duc de Mantes
- 1956: Cela s'appelle l'aurore (directed by Luis Buñuel) - The Commissioner Fasaro
- 1957: L'Homme à l'imperméable (directed by Julien Duvivier) - Le metteur en scène
- 1957: The Wheel (directed by André Haguet et Maurice Delbez) - Périer
- 1958: Les Copains du dimanche (directed by Henri Aisner) - Jean Raymond dit Raf
- 1958: En cas de malheur (directed by Claude Autant-Lara) - L'inspecteur
- 1958: Les Grandes Familles (directed by Denys de la Patellière) - Le père de Lesquendieu
- 1958: Vertiges (Short, directed by J.K et Monique Raymond-Millet)
- 1960: Le Gigolo (directed by Jacques Deray) - Le commissaire
- 1961: Madame Sans-Gêne (directed by Christian-Jaque) - Napoléon Bonaparte
- 1961: Vu du ciel (moyen métrage - directed by Jacques Letellier) - Narrator (voice)
- 1962: Un chien dans un jeu de quilles (directed by Fabien Collin)
- 1963: Fernand Léger (Short, directed by Tony Saytor et José Cordero) - Narrator (voice)
- 1963: Douce amère (Short, directed by Alain Jacquier) - Narrator (voice)
- 1963: Le Chevalier de Maison-Rouge (TV Mini-Series, directed by Claude Barma) - Fouquier-Tinville
- 1965: Le Vrai Mystère de la passion (Documentary, directed by Louis Dalmas) - Himself
- 1969: La Voie lactée (directed by Luis Buñuel) - Richard 'maître d'hôtel' / Maitre d'Hotel
- 1969: Dieu a choisi Paris (directed by Gilbert Prouteau et Philippe Arthuys) - Recitant (voice)
- 1972: Le Charme discret de la bourgeoisie (directed by Luis Buñuel) - Monsignor Dufour
- 1974: L'Horloger de Saint-Paul (directed by Bertrand Tavernier) - Edouard - un ami de Michel
- 1974: Le Fantôme de la liberté (directed by Luis Buñuel) - Le premier préfet de police / First Prefect
- 1974: Verdict (directed by André Cayatte) - Verlac, l'avocat général
- 1975: Section spéciale (directed by Costa-Gavras) - L'avocat général Victor Dupuich, chef du Service central du Parquet
- 1977: La fille d'Amérique (de David Newman) - M. Duclos
- 1977: Cet obscur objet du désir (directed by Luis Buñuel) - Edouard
- 1977: Julie était belle ou Un été pas comme les autres (directed by Jacques-René Saurel) - L'homme au fusil
- 1977: Black out (directed by Philippe Mordacq - Film resté inédit) - Le mari de la vieille dame
- 1979: L'Amour en fuite (directed by François Truffaut) - Monsieur Lucien
- 1986: Conseil de famille (directed by Costa-Gavras) - Le propriétaire de la maison fléchettes (final film role)

=== Television ===
- 1961: Les Parents terribles (directed by Jean Cocteau and Jean-Paul Carrère)
- 1963: Le Chevalier de Maison-Rouge (directed by Claude Barma)
- 1964: Le Miroir à trois faces: Werther (by Wolfgang Goethe), TV, directed by Aimée Mortimer: Albin Kespner)
- 1975: ce soir: La Facture (by Françoise Dorin, adapted by Jacques Charon, directed by Pierre Sabbagh, Théâtre Édouard VII)
