= Marie-Thérèse Figueur =

French writer (1774–1861)

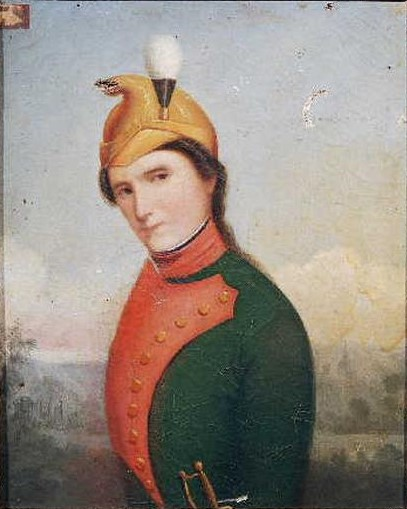
- Thérèse Figueur in her dragoon uniform
- Born: January 17, 1774; Talmay
- Died: January 16, 1861 (aged 86); Paris, hospice des Petits Ménages
- Spouse(s): 1796: Henri Commarmot; 1810: Charles Dovalle; 1818: Clément Joseph Melchior Sutter
- Military career
- Allegiance: French First Republic; First French Empire
- Service years: 1793–1800; 1803–1805; 1809/10–1814; 1815
- Nickname: Mme Sans-Gêne
- Units: 8th Hussars; Légion des Allobroges; 15th Dragoons
- Conflicts: French Revolutionary Wars; Siege of Toulon; French invasion of Switzerland; Suvorov's Italian and Swiss expedition; Battle of Genola; Napoleonic Wars; Battle of Ulm; Battle of Austerlitz; Battle of Jena; Siege of Burgos
- Awards: Médaille de Sainte-Hélène
- Memorials: Plaque erected in 1907 at Talmay

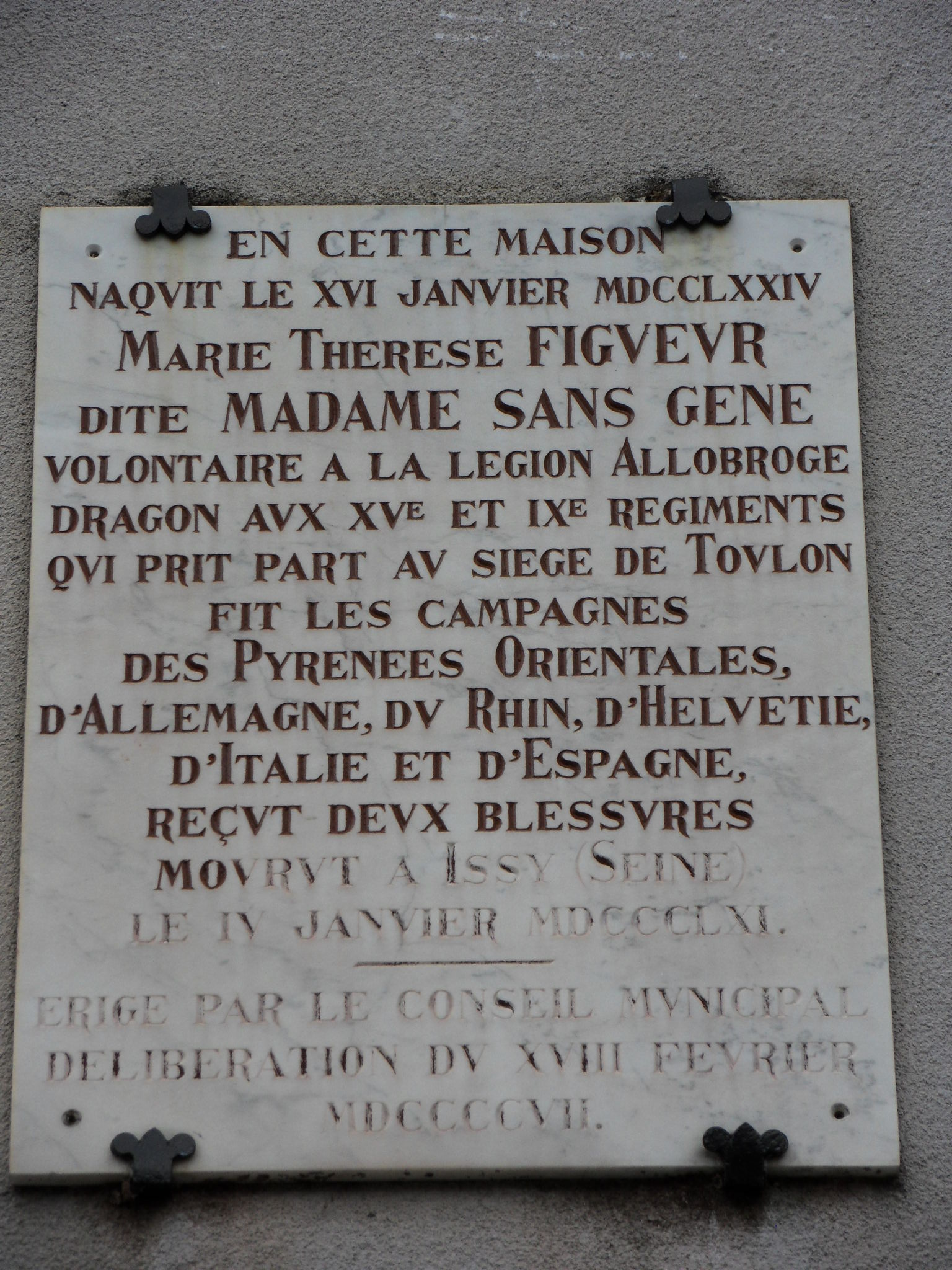
Plaque erected in 1907 at Talmay. On 16 January 1774 Marie Thérèse Figueur, called Madame Sans-Gêne, was born in this house.

Marie-Thérèse Figueur (Talmay, 17 January 1774 – Paris, hospice des Petits Ménages, 4 January 1861), known by the nom de guerre Sans-Gêne (literally "unconstrained"), was a French soldier who fought in the French Revolutionary Wars and Napoleonic Wars. Unlike some other female soldiers before the twentieth century, she did not disguise her gender when she enlisted, serving for twenty-two years under her own name in the French Revolutionary Army and the Grande Armée.

== Upbringing and enlistment (1774–1793) ==
According to her memoirs, Marie-Thérèse Figueur was born in Talmay, near Dijon, the daughter of François Figueur, a miller and merchant, and Claudine Viard, from a family of minor nobility; orphaned at nine years of age, she was entrusted to a maternal uncle, Jean Viard, a sous-lieutenant in an infantry regiment.

By her own account, she was not initially a supporter of the French Revolution; her uncle was a firm, if discreet, royalist, and she feared her best friend, a drummer-boy in the Swiss Guard, had been killed during the overthrow of the monarchy, when the National Guard stormed the Tuileries Palace. She joined the counter-revolutionary Federalist uprising in 1793, in a unit of volunteer artillery led by her uncle, now a captain. Captured by the forces of the Republican government, she was encouraged to change sides, and on 9 July 1793, the nineteen-year-old enlisted as a cavalry trooper in the Légion des Allobroges under Colonel Pinon. Quickly earning the nickname le petit Sans-Gêne, she saw her first real battle at the siege of Toulon, where she was wounded for the first time, and first met Napoleon, then a young artillery commander.

== A Dragoon of the Republic (1793–1800) ==
After the siege, her unit was reorganized in the amalgamation of the 15th Dragoon Regiment, based at Castres. There she learnt horsemanship and formation maneuvers, and the use of firearms and the sword. She also adopted the severe powdered queue hairstyle of a professional soldier, although she stood out due to her short stature, under five French feet in her riding-boots (around 5 feet 4 inches or 160 cm). The regiment was soon assigned to the Army of the Eastern Pyrenees for the campaign of 1793–94, where she saved the life of the grievously-wounded General Noguès, had two horses shot from under her, and refused a promotion to corporal.

At this point, although she does not mention it in her memoirs, she appears to have left the dragoons and returned home; on 27 June 1796, she married Henri Commarmot, a cavalryman in the 8th Hussars, then forming part of the Dijon garrison in the Army of the Rhine. Army records show that she herself joined the 8th Hussars as a trooper on 21 December 1797, under the surname of Sangène; she remained with them even when Commarmot transferred to another regiment, but in November 1798, she transferred back to the 15th Dragoons. She was thus a soldier in the Hussars during the invasion of Switzerland.

The memoirs give no hint of the marriage with Commarmot, discharge from the 15th Dragoons, or transfer to the Hussars; she says that she missed Napoleon's iconic victories of 1796–97 due to serving on garrison duty around Milan, although she does mention her service in Switzerland. Nonetheless, the records confirm the next section of her narrative: she rejoined the garrison element of the 15th Dragoons when the main body of the regiment was in Egypt, and was reassigned to the 9th Dragoons fighting in Italy. Captured briefly (according to the memoir, seized by Austrian hussars and allowed to escape by French royalists), she was subsequently wounded by four sabre cuts at the Battle of Genola on 4 November 1799, having had another horse shot from under her, and was captured a second time. Eventually, she managed to scramble back to the French lines.

The memoir claims that effects of her sabring at Savigliano were exacerbated by subsequent mountain campaigning against Swiss partisans in the snow of the Alps. In 1800, after exploring a return to the 15th Dragoons, she was granted an annual pension of 200 francs and an honourable discharge from the army, aided by personal recommendations from the renowned Generals Augereau and Lannes. Her stipend was around twice a soldier's basic pay, approximating to that of a NCO.

== Soldier in the Grande Armée (1802–1815) ==
After recuperating until 1802, she decided to re-enlist, rejoining the 9th Dragoons, now garrisoned in Paris, as a gentleman volunteer. The memoirs claim that she was accorded many of the privileges of an officer, and she found herself an object of curiosity in fashionable society, culminating in a dinner invitation with Napoleon, now First Consul of the Republic. For ten days, she became an attendant to Josephine, but she found it hard to adapt to the informal idleness of the Château de Saint-Cloud, so she returned to her regiment in the Paris garrison until 1805, when Marshal Augereau recruited her as a uniformed aide-de-camp for his wife, who, like her, enjoyed both riding and shooting – a more conducive household than Saint-Cloud. The basic outline is confirmed by the appearance of her stipend at St-Cloud in Napoleon's accounts in 1804, and by the eyewitness memoirs of Marbot, which vouch for her role with Augereau, and summarize her previous biography up to her departure from Saint-Cloud. In 1805, she was also proposed (albeit unsuccessfully) for the Napoleonic army's gallantry medal, the Légion d'honneur.

After a falling-out with the Marshal, Figueur returned to active duty; the memoirs claim that she fought with her regiment in the great victories of Ulm, Austerlitz and Jena, and that an accident on the road to Berlin led to a second period of convalescence. In the early twentieth century, the French researcher Léon Hennet argued that this campaign was largely fabricated by the memoirs' editor, citing records that place Sans-Gêne in Paris until the very end of 1805, and dating her sick-leave to an incident near Linz in February 1806.

The account in the memoirs claims that Marie-Thérèse sought to return to active duty from 1809, borne out by the tone of letters of recommendation from Generals François Jean Baptiste Quesnel and Marie-François Auguste de Caffarelli du Falga, apparently dating to 1811; General Soulès was pleased to recruit her into a new infantry regiment of the Imperial Guard, who formed the garrison at Burgos in the Spanish campaign. At Burgos, however, she fell into the hands of the Spanish guerrillas of the cura Merino and was taken as a prisoner of war to England.

A second marriage again passes unmentioned in her memoirs, this time to Charles Dovalle, a former cavalryman in the 9th Dragoons who had become the sergeant of the grenadier company at Burgos in 1810, and it also seems that Marie-Thérèse came to be relegated to the non-combat rôle of cantinière by 1812: Hennet suggested (perhaps on scanty evidence) that this marriage predated and precipitated her decision to join the Burgos garrison, which he dates to 1812, and that rather than being captured by the Spanish partisans, she volunteered to join Dovalle, who had been seized while on guard duty.

Cover of Figueur's memoirs

When Napoleon abdicated in 1814, Marie-Thérèse was released and returned to France. There seems to be little documentation from this period, but, according to her memoirs, she reported to General Charles Lefebvre-Desnouettes, who found her a place in his prestigious regiment of chasseurs à cheval, formerly Napoleon's personal escort. During Napoleon's brief return to power in the Hundred Days, the regiment returned to their former duties, and Mademoiselle Sans-Gêne had her final face-to-face meeting with him; she did not join the regiment when it marched to war, and the defeat at Waterloo prevented her receiving an imperial bounty of 1500 francs. Unable to secure assignment in a combat unit during the final skirmishes around Paris, she served instead as a cantinière and a stretcher-bearer, in what proved to be her final battle.

== Later life and legacy ==
After Waterloo, Marie-Thérèse opened a table d'hôte restaurant in partnership with renowned balloonist and pioneer parachutist Jeanne Garnerin (née Labrosse) the widow of André-Jacques Garnerin. In July 1818, she married her old friend Clément Joseph Melchior Sutter, the Swiss drummer-boy whom she believed dead after 10 August 1792, now a senior non-commissioned officer in a prestigious cavalry unit of the royal guard.

Le petit Sans-Gêne eventually dictated her memoirs, which were first published in 1842: the main omissions and elaborations, identified by Dumay and Hennet in the early twentieth centuries, have been noted above; the memoir may also be wildly incorrect about her uncle, who she claims to have "lost at the time of the Italian campaign". Hennet believed that these inaccuracies were largely creations of the memoirs' editor. A second, shorter edition of her memoir, apparently based on independent archival research and interviews, appeared in 1861,

Napoleon III had granted her an additional pension, and she eventually retired to a hospice in Issy, apparently alongside Sergeant Virginie Ghesquiere, the first woman to be awarded the Légion d'honneur. In the nineteenth century, she enjoyed enough celebrity for Victorien Sardou to borrow her nom de guerre as the title of his 1893 Théâtre du Vaudeville play Madame Sans Gêne—but he repurposed the nickname for Cathérine Hübscher, the wife of Marshal Lefebvre. The popularity of the play and subsequent adaptations (a novel, an opera, and a large number of screen versions) somewhat obscured the real Sans-Gêne, but its success also provoked a new edition of her memoirs, and led to favourable comparisons between Marie-Thérèse and Cathérine Hübscher.

Occasionally, commentators have questioned the overall authenticity of her biography, but documents relating to her career were deposited in the Musée de l'Armée in 1906, and the twentieth century saw a series of document-based historical studies which clarified the details of her biography. A novel, Thérèse Sans-Gêne by Colette Piat, was published in 1986.
