= Madame (1961 film) =

Madame Sans-Gêne
- Film poster
- Directed by: Christian-Jaque
- Written by: Jean Ferry; Henri Jeanson; Christian-Jaque; Ennio De Concini; Franco Solinas
- Produced by: Maleno Malenotti
- Starring: Sophia Loren; Robert Hossein; Renaud Mary
- Cinematography: Roberto Gerardi
- Music by: Angelo Francesco Lavagnino (original music); Umberto Giordano (opera)
- Distributed by: Embassy Pictures (US)
- Release dates: 1961; 13 February 1963 (U.S.)
- Running time: 98 minutes 104 minutes (USA); 108 minutes (Italy-DVD)
- Countries: Spain; Italy; France
- Languages: Italian; French

Madame Sans-Gêne is a 1961 Spanish-Italian-French film co-production, filmed in Eastmancolor and Technirama, and distributed in the United States by Embassy Pictures. The film was directed by Christian-Jaque and adapted from the 1893 play Madame Sans-Gêne by Victorien Sardou and Émile Moreau.

The film stars Sophia Loren and a cast of French and Italian actors, including Robert Hossein, Julien Bertheau, Renaud Mary, Léa Gray, Gianrico Tedeschi, and Marina Berti.

== Background ==
Madame Sans-Gêne has a legendary history in France. It is based on the life of Catherine Hübscher, born in Goldbach-Altenbach (Haut-Rhin) in 1753. She started off as a laundress who used to wash and iron Napoleon's clothes when he was a common corporal. She married François Joseph Lefebvre, an army sergeant who became Marshal of France and was later elevated by Napoleon I to the rank of Duke of Danzig. She was known by the nickname of Madame Sans-Gêne, (literally Mrs No Embarrassment) because of her behaviour, free speech and lack of proper manners at court.

The play by Victorien Sardou and Émile Moreau was extremely popular. It was later serialised in novel form by Raymond Lepelletier.

The role was played on stage by Réjane, in France, England and New York and who also brought it to the screen twice, in 1900 and 1911. In 1924, silent screen star Gloria Swanson played the title role and it was an international box-office success. In 1941, it was played by Arletty. In 1945, it was made into an Argentinian film. The story was also the subject of the opera Madame Sans-Gêne by Umberto Giordano which had its world premiere at the Metropolitan Opera in 1915.

== Production ==
The 1961 film featured a FRF6 million budget, lavish period sets, and costumes designed for Loren by Marcel Escoffier and Itala Scandariato.

It was shot in Tuscany and Pisa; Loren indicated that the "character corresponded to her sensibility".

Henri Jeanson wrote the screenplay.

== See also ==
- List of Technirama films
