= Madame Sans-Gêne (1925 film) =

1924 film by Léonce Perret

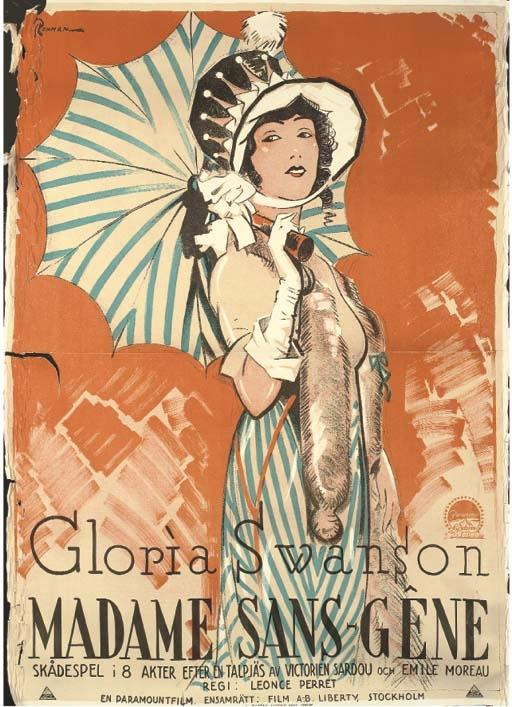
- 1925 Swedish theatrical poster
- Directed by: Léonce Perret
- Screenplay by: Forrest Halsey
- Based on: Madame Sans-Gêne by Victorien Sardou and Emile Moreau
- Produced by: Jesse L. Lasky; Adolph Zukor
- Starring: Gloria Swanson; Émile Drain; Charles de Rochefort
- Cinematography: Raymond Agnel; Jacques Bizeul(fr); René Guissart; J. Peverell Marley; George Webber
- Music by: Hugo Riesenfeld
- Production company: Famous Players–Lasky
- Distributed by: Paramount Pictures
- Release dates: April 20, 1925 (United States); December 15, 1925 (France)
- Running time: 100 minutes
- Country: United States
- Language: Silent (English intertitles)

Madame Sans-Gêne (Madame Careless) is a 1925 American silent romantic costume comedy-drama film directed by Léonce Perret and starring Gloria Swanson. Based on the 1893 play of the same name by Victorien Sardou and Émile Moreau, the film was released by Paramount Pictures. The screenplay was by Forrest Halsey and Leonce Perret directed. The play had previously been adapted to the screen in 1911.

== Plot ==
Trailer for the film (public domain)

As described in a film magazine review, at the time after the French Revolution, a sharp-witted laundress fights for her country and wins favor with a Duke. After her marriage to him, she is accepted in the court of Napoleon. Because her manners are not fashionable, she is called before Napoleon. She triumphs over the court with her wits and returns to her husband, whom she loves.

== Cast ==
- Gloria Swanson as Catherine Hubscher
- Émile Drain as Napoleon Bonaparte
- Charles De Roche as Le Febvre
- Madeleine Guitty as La Rousette
- Warwick Ward as Neipperg
- Guy Favières as Fouche
- Renée Héribel as Princess Eliza
- Suzanne Bianchetti as L'imperatrice
- Denise Lorys as Madame de Bulow
- Arlette Marchal as La reine de Naples
- Jacques Marney as Savary

== Production ==
The film was produced and filmed in France, as Swanson was on extended vacation there. She soon became involved with Henri de La Falaise, hired by Paramount to be her French interpreter, and who later became her third husband.

== Preservation ==
Madame Sans-Gene is currently presumed lost. In February of 2021, the film was cited by the National Film Preservation Board on their Lost U.S. Silent Feature Films list. An original movie trailer displaying short clips of the film still exists, however, and can be seen on YouTube.

== See also ==
- List of lost films
- List of Paramount Pictures films
