= Madame Sans-Gêne (1941 film) =

1941 film

- Directed by: Roger Richebé
- Written by: Jean Aurenche; Pierre Lestringuez; Roger Richebé
- Based on: Madame Sans-Gêne by Victorien Sardou and Émile Moreau
- Produced by: Roger Richebé
- Starring: Arletty; Aimé Clariond; Maurice Escande
- Cinematography: Jean Isnard
- Edited by: Raymond Lamy
- Music by: Vincent Scotto
- Production company: Films Roger Richebé
- Distributed by: Films Roger Richebé
- Release date: 7 October 1941
- Running time: 100 minutes
- Country: France
- Language: French

Madame Sans-Gêne is a 1941 French historical comedy drama film directed by Roger Richebé and starring Arletty, Aimé Clariond and Maurice Escande. It is based on the 1893 play Madame Sans-Gêne by Victorien Sardou and Émile Moreau inspired by the life of Catherine Hubscher. It was shot at the Saint-Maurice Studios in Paris and on location at the Château de Grosbois. The film's sets were designed by the art director Jacques Krauss.

== Cast ==
- Arletty as Catherine Hubscher
- Aimé Clariond as Le chef de la police Fouché
- Maurice Escande as Le comte de Neipperg
- Henri Nassiet as Le maréchal Lefebvre
- Jeanne Reinhardt as Le reine Caroline
- Madeleine Sylvain as La princesse Élisa
- Albert Dieudonné as Napoléon 1er
- Geneviève Auger as L'impératrice Marie-Louise
- Mona Dol as Madame de Bülow
- Ror Volmar as La chanteuse
- André Carnège as Savary
- Paul Amiot as Maximilien de Robespierre
- Robert Vattier as Jasmin
- Alain Cuny as Roustan
- Léon Walther as Despréaux
- Marcel Talmont as Corso
- Pierre Vernet as Leroy
- André Lorière as Cop
- Odette Talazac as Nanette
- Hubert de Malet as Junot
- Geneviève Morel as Julie

== Bibliography ==
- Goble, Alan. The Complete Index to Literary Sources in Film. Walter de Gruyter, 1999.
- Rège, Philippe. Encyclopedia of French Film Directors, Volume 1. Scarecrow Press, 2009.
