= Madame Sans-Gêne (1911 film) =

- Directed by: André Calmettes (?); Henri Desfontaines (?)
- Based on: the 1893 play Madame Sans-Gêne by Victorien Sardou and Émile Moreau
- Starring: Gabrielle Réjane; Edmond Duquesne; Georges Dorival; Jacques Volnys
- Production company: Pathé Frères (as Film d'Art)
- Distributed by: Pathé Frères (France); Franco-American Film Company (US)
- Release date: November 10, 1911
- Running time: 3 reels
- Country: France
- Language: Silent

Madame Sans-Gêne is a 1911 silent French film set in the French Revolution and during Napoleon's reign. It is based on the 1893 play of the same name by Victorien Sardou and Émile Moreau. Gabrielle Réjane and Edmond Duquesne reprised their roles in the play; Réjane played the title character, a laundress who marries a man who becomes one of Napoleon's field marshals (based on the real-life Catherine Hübscher), while Duquesne played Napoleon. Conflicting sources state the director was André Calmettes or Henri Desfontaines.

According to Richard Abel, Madame Sans-Gêne is "still extant."
