= Émile Drain =

French actor and comedian (1890–1966)

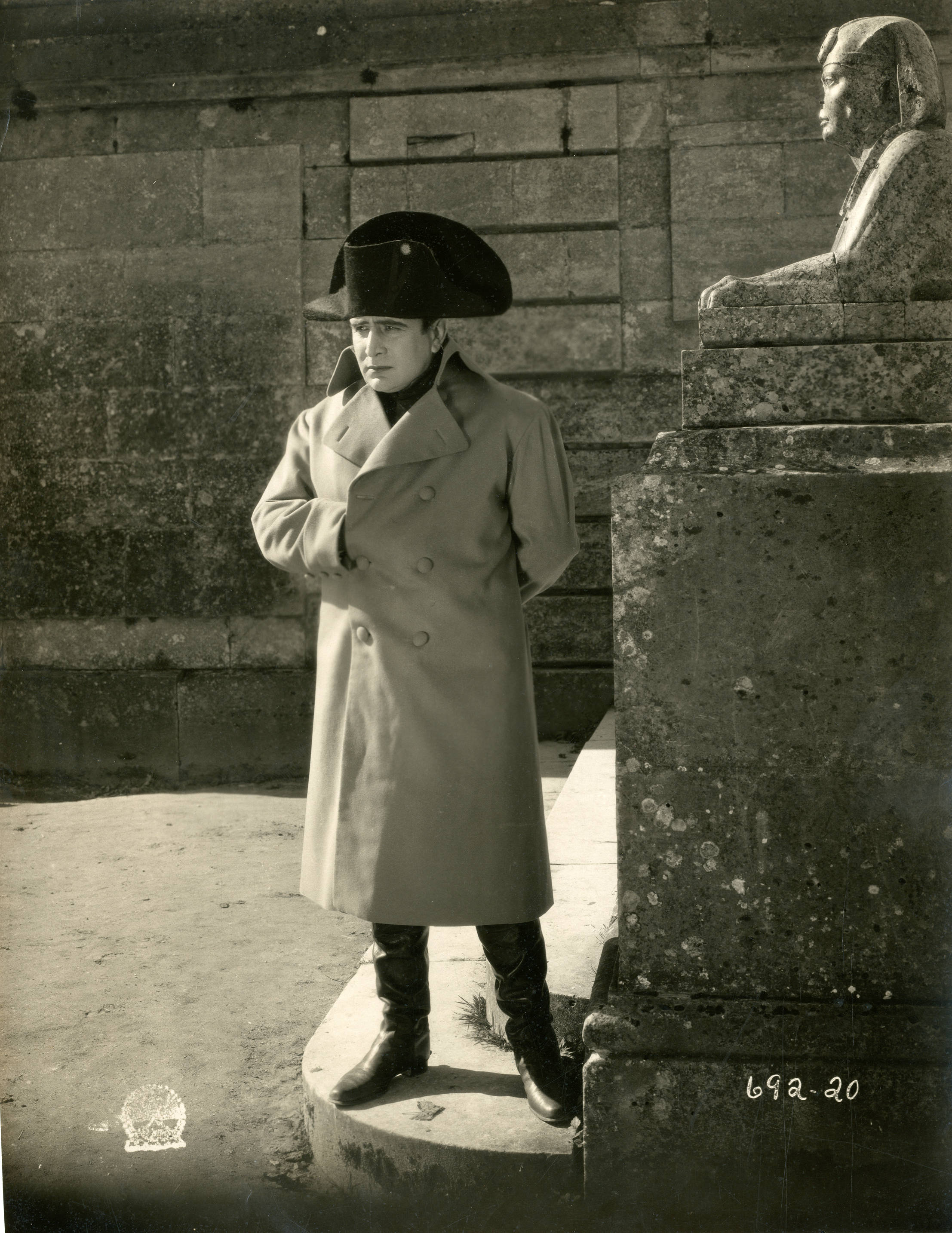
- Still from Madam Sans-Gêne (1925)
- Born: Émile Pierre Charles Drain; February 1, 1890; Paris, France
- Died: November 22, 1966 (aged 76); Paris, France
- Occupations: Actor, comedian
- Years active: 1909-1965

Émile Drain (1890–1966) was a French actor and comedian.

In 1925, he starred as Napoleon with Gloria Swanson in Madame Sans-Gêne. In 1927, he played Napoleon in the Donald Crisp directed The Fighting Eagle. In 1948, he appeared, again as Napoleon, in the film The Lame Devil.

== Selected filmography ==
- Après la chute de l'aigle (1909)
- Androcles and the Lion (1911)
- Trois Familles (Three Families) (1918)
- Papa bon cœur (1919) - Marcel Daubenton
- La Double Existence du docteur Mozart (1919) - Docteur André
- Un drame sous (Drama With Napoleon) (1921) - Napoleon
- L'Aiglonne (1921) - Napoleon
- Molière, sa vie, son œuvre (1922)
- Château historique (1923)
- After Love (1924)
- Madam Sans-Gêne (1925) - Napoleon
- The Fighting Eagle (1927)
- Madame Récamier (1928) - Napoleon
- The Foreigner (1931) - M. Mauriceau
- L'Aiglon (The Eagle) (1931) - Napoleon
- Imperial Violets (1932)
- Casanova (1934) - Monseigneur de Bernis
- La vie est à nous (1936) - Old Bertin
- Le Perles de la couronne (1937) - Napoleon
- Remontons les Champs-Élysées (1938) - Napoleon
- La rue sans joie (Joyless Road) (1938) - President
- Le Bal de passants (1943) - Dr. Baudouin
- Master Love (1945)
- Panique (Panic (1946) - M. Breteuil
- La Kermesse rouge (1946) - a Dominican reverend
- La Revanche de Roger la Honte (1946)
- Les Portes de la nuit (Night Gates) (1946)
- Antoine and Antoinete (Antoine et Antoinette) (1946)
- Les amoureux sont seuls au monde (1947) - a critic
- Croisière pour l'inconnu (1947)
- Le Diamant de cent sous (1947)
- The Scarlet Bazaar (1947)
- The Lame Devil (1948) - Napoleon
- La Marie du Port (1949)
- Superpacific (1949)
- Justice est faite (1950) - Prof. Dutoit
- Si Versailles m'était conté... (1953) - Napoleon
- Si Paris nous était conté (1955) - Victor Hugo
- Le Pays d'où je viens (1956)

== Theatre ==
| Year | Play | Director | Theater |
|---|---|---|---|
| 1913 | La Rue de Sentier | Pierre Decourcelle et André Maurel | Théâtre de l'Odéon |
| 1920 | La Fille de Roland; Daughter of Roland | Henri de Bornier | Comédie-Française |
| 1920 | La Mort enchaînée | Maurice Magre | Comédie-Française |
| 1920 | Les Effrontés | Émile Augier | Comédie-Française |
| 1920 | Barberine | Alfred de Musset | Comédie-Française |
| 1921 | Circé; Circe | Alfred Poizat | Comédie-Française |
| 1921 | La Coupe enchantée The Enchanted Cup | Jean de La Fontaine and Champmeslé | Comédie-Française |
| 1921 | An Enemy of the People | Henrik Ibsen | Comédie-Française |
| 1921 | Cleopatra | André-Ferdinand Hérold, based on a play by Plutarch and William Shakespeare | Comédie-Française |
| 1921 | Le Paon | Francis de Croisset | Comédie-Française |
| 1922 | Marion Delorme | Victor Hugo | Comédie-Française |
| 1922 | Les Phéniciennes; The Phoenicians | Georges Rivollet | Comédie-Française |
| 1922 | Vautrin | Edmond Guiraud, based on a play by Honoré de Balzac | Comédie-Française |
| 1922 | Le Chevalier de Colomb | François Porché | Comédie-Française |
| 1922 | Ésope; Aesop | Théodore de Banville | Comédie-Française |
| 1923 | Le carnaval des enfants Children's Carnival | Saint-Georges de Bouhélier | Comédie-Française |
| 1923 | Rome vaincue | Alexandre Parodi | Comédie-Française |
| 1923 | Les Deux Trouvailles de Gallus | Victor Hugo | Comédie-Française |
| 1923 | Oreste; Orestes | René Berton, based on the play Iphigenia in Tauris by Euripides | Comédie-Française |
| 1923 | Jean de La Fontaine ou Le Distrait volontaire | Louis Geandreau and Léon Guillot de Saix | Comédie-Française |
| 1923 | Poliche | Henry Bataille | Comédie-Française |
| 1924 | Molière et son ombre Molière and the Shadow | Jacques Richepin | Comédie-Française |
| 1924 | L'École des quinquagénaires | Tristan Bernard | Comédie-Française |
| 1929 | Histoires de France; Histories of France | Sacha Guitry | Théâtre Pigalle |
| 1931 | Frans Hals ou L'Admiration | Sacha Guitry | Théâtre de la Madeleine |
| 1934 | Le Chef; The Chief | Drieu La Rochelle | Théâtre du Vieux-Colombier |
| 1935 | Saint Joan | George Bernard Shaw | Théâtre des Mathurins |
| 1935 | La Complainte de Pranzini et de Thérèse de Lisieux | Henri Ghéon | Théâtre des Mathurins |
| 1938 | Le Comédien; The Comedian | Sacha Guitry | Théâtre de la Madeleine |
| 1940 | Le Bossu | Paul Féval and Auguste Anicet-Bourgeois | Théâtre de la Porte-Saint-Martin |
| 1941 | Les Deux Orphelines | Adolphe d'Ennery and Eugène Cormon | Théâtre de la Porte-Saint-Martin |
| 1942 | La Tornade (The Tornado) | Pierre Maudru | Théâtre Charles de Rochefort |
| 1946 | Le Cocu magnifique | Fernand Crommelynck | Théâtre des Célestins |
| 1947 | The Trial | Franz Kafka | Théâtre Marigny |
| 1948 | The Lame Devil | Sacha Guitry | Théâtre Édouard VII |

== Bibliography ==
- Paul Bauer, Deux siècles d'histoire au Père Lachaise, Mémoire et Documents, 2006, p. 291 ISBN 978-2914611480
