= Verdict (1974 film) =

- French film poster
- Directed by: André Cayatte
- Written by: Paul Andréota; André Cayatte
- Produced by: Carlo Ponti
- Starring: Sophia Loren; Jean Gabin; Julien Bertheau
- Cinematography: Jean Badal
- Edited by: Paul Cayatte
- Music by: Louiguy
- Distributed by: Warner-Columbia
- Release date: 11 September 1974
- Running time: 95 minutes
- Countries: France; Italy
- Language: French

Verdict is a 1974 French-Italian drama film, directed by André Cayatte, starring Sophia Loren, Jean Gabin and Julien Bertheau. A French judge comes under intense personal pressure to acquit a man who is accused of murdering his lover. It was also released under the title Jury of One.

== Plot ==
The President of the Court Legun one evening, while he is at home alone with his wife Nicole, refuses to receive Mrs Teresa Léoni who would like to ask for mercy for her son André on trial for the rape and murder of Annie Chartier. Leguen, known for his severity, in fact conducts the first hearing with the usual drasticity. Then Teresa, widow of a bandit, convinced of her son's innocence, takes Mrs. Nicole hostage and blackmails her husband. The latter, having tried in vain to change the opinion of the blackmailer, changes his attitude and, despite the general amazement and the remarks of the Attorney General, influences the jurors to the point of snatching the verdict of full acquittal from them. But Nicole, in need of daily injections due to diabetes, refuses the medicines and dies. With this involuntary death on her conscience and after the confession of her freed son, Teresa throws herself with the car against a wall.

== Cast ==
- Sophia Loren as Teresa Leoni
- Jean Gabin as Leguen, the Judge
- Julien Bertheau as Verlac, the Advocate General
- Muriel Catalá as Anne Chartier
- Michel Albertini as André Leoni
- Gisèle Casadesus as Nicole Leguen
- Michel Robin as Véricel
- Henri Garcin as Maître Lannelongue
- Marthe Villalonga as The Concierge
- Daniel Lecourtois as Le procureur général
- Chantal Ladesou as a jury
