= Les Butors et la Finette =

Les Butors et la Finette is a 1917 play by French dramatist François Porché. Described as a "symbolical and allegorical drama", with "shocking realism", the play was hailed as the best French drama of World War I and one of its most original.
