= Paul Porel =

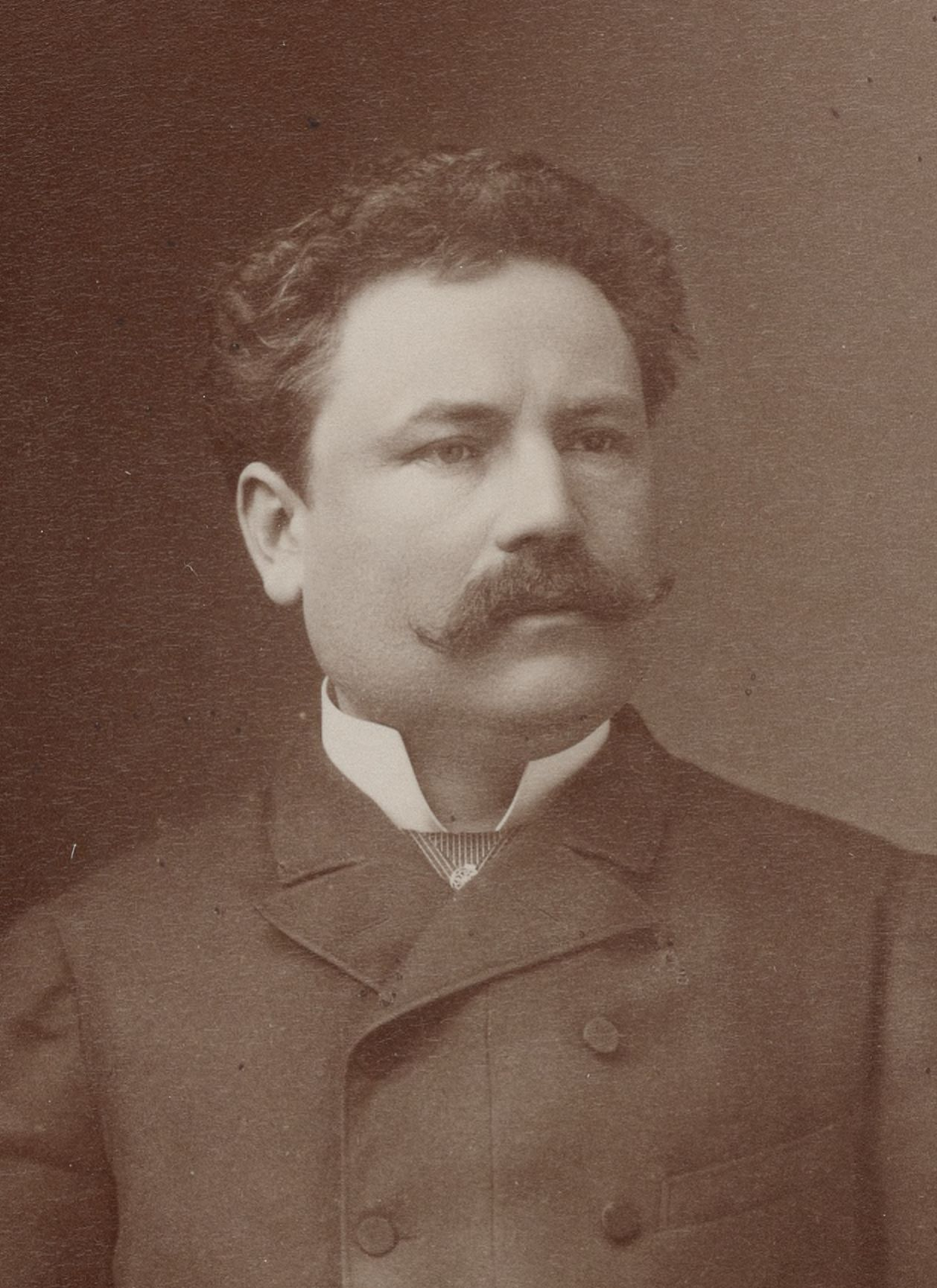
Porel, 1875

Paul Porel, né Désiré Paul Parfouru (25 October 1843 – 4 August 1917), was a French actor, director and theatre manager. He was for many years closely associated with the Théâtre de l'Odéon in Paris, where he was first an actor, and then stage director, and, from December 1884 to May 1892, general director. The Odéon was at that time ranked as the second French theatre, after the Comédie Française.

Under Porel's management the Théâtre de l'Odéon was fully illuminated with electricity, in 1888. In June 1892 he applied for the post of director of the Paris Opéra. He was unsuccessful, and in disappointment, he resigned from the management of the Odéon. He moved to the Théâtre du Vaudeville, where he remained in charge until his death.

Between 1893 and 1905 Porel was married to the actress Gabrielle Réjane with whom he had two children. He died in Paris at the age of 73.
