= The Fighting Eagle =

1927 film by Donald Crisp

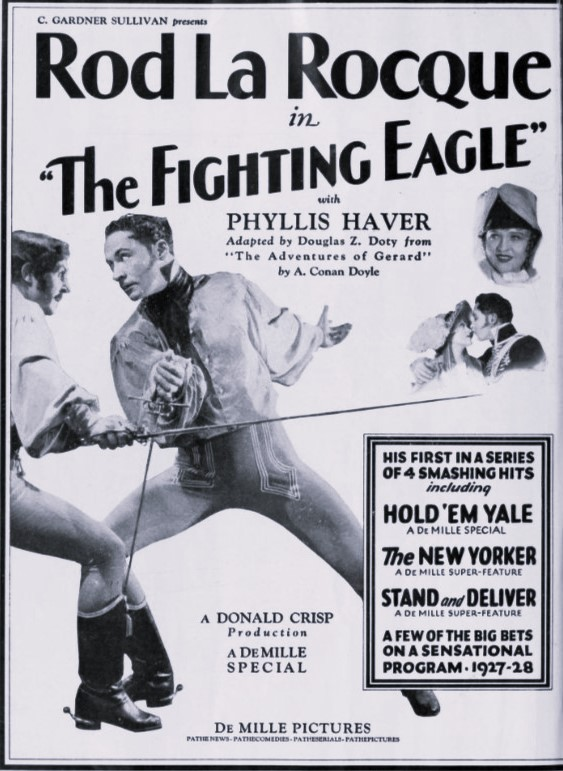
- Advertisement
- Directed by: Donald Crisp
- Written by: Douglas Z. Doty (adaptation, screenplay); John W. Krafft (intertitles)
- Based on: Brigadier Gerard by Arthur Conan Doyle
- Produced by: Cecil B. DeMille
- Cinematography: Arthur C. Miller and/or J. Peverell Marley
- Edited by: Barbara Hunter
- Distributed by: Pathé Exchange
- Release date: August 29, 1927
- Running time: 54 minutes
- Country: United States
- Language: Silent (English intertitles)

The Fighting Eagle is a 1927 American silent adventure and romantic drama film starring Rod La Rocque. It was directed by Donald Crisp and it was produced by Cecil B. DeMille. The film is set during the Napoleonic Era.

== Cast ==
- Rod La Rocque as Etienne Gerard
- Phyllis Haver as Countess de Launay
- Sam De Grasse as Talleyrand
- Max Barwyn as Napoleon
- Julia Faye as Josephine de Beauharnais
- Sally Rand as Fraulein Hertz
- Clarence Burton as Col. Neville
- Alphonse Ethier as Major Oliver
- Emile Drain as Napoleon
- Carole Lombard

== Preservation ==
Prints of The Fighting Eagle are located in several collections and has been released on DVD.

== See also ==
- Brigadier Gerard (1915)
- The Adventures of Gerard (1970)
