= Cela s'appelle l'aurore =

- Theatrical poster
- Directed by: Luis Buñuel, with assistance from Marcel Camus and Jacques Deray
- Written by: Jean Ferry; Luis Buñuel; Based on a novel by Emmanuel Roblès
- Produced by: Edmond Ténoudji; Claude Jaeger
- Starring: Georges Marchal; Lucia Bosé; Julien Bertheau; Giani Esposito
- Music by: Joseph Kosma
- Distributed by: Les Films Marceau; Laetitia Film
- Release date: 9 May 1956 (France)
- Running time: 102 minutes
- Language: French

Cela s'appelle l'aurore (English: This is Called Dawn) is a 1956 Franco-Italian film, directed by Luis Buñuel. It was written by Buñuel and Jean Ferry, based on a novel by Emmanuel Roblès.

== Plot ==
In a town in Corsica, Dr. Valerio is committed to caring for the poor. His childless wife, Angela, cannot stand the place and wants to move to Nice, but the doctor does not want to leave before finding a replacement. Valerio is sympathetic to the working poor of the area, particularly Sandro, a farm worker who maintains the trees belonging to Gorzone, a rich industrialist and the primary employer in the town. Angela becomes ill and wanders the town's slum quarters in a delirium, ultimately leaving the town for a holiday in Nice without her husband. The Commissioner of Police takes Valerio to a mountain village in order to sign medical reports for a little girl who had been raped by her grandfather. There, Valerio meets Clara, a rich young widow. He offers a relationship, but is rebuffed. Meanwhile, Sandro is dismissed by Gorzone, forcing Sandro and his tubercular wife, Magda, to leave their home, a move that results in Magda's death. Distracted by grief, Sandro shoots Gorzone. Valerio hides Sandro from the police, a decision that results in Angela leaving the doctor for good. Sandro leaves Valerio's protection and, when cornered by the authorities, shoots himself. Valerio refuses to shake hands with the Commissioner, and the last scene shows Valerio and Clara walking away at night, arm in arm on the quayside, followed by some of Sandro's friends.

== Political theme ==
Film critic Raymond Durgnat has called this film the first of Buñuel's "revolutionary triptych", along with La Mort en ce jardin and La fièvre monte à El Pao: "Each of these films is, openly, or by implication, a study in the morality and tactics of armed revolution against a right-wing dictatorship."

== Cast ==
| Georges Marchal | Doctor Valerio |
| Lucia Bosé | Clara |
| Julien Bertheau | Commissioner Fasaro |
| Nelly Borgeaud | Angela |
| Giani Esposito | Sandro Galli |
| Brigitte Elloy | Magda |
| Jean-Jacques Delbo | Gorzone |
| Simone Paris | Mrs. Gorzone |
| Henri Nassiet | Angela's father |
| Gaston Modot | Sandro's replacement |

== Reception ==
Time Out wrote "Highly rated by the director himself, but poorly received and subsequently rarely shown, this is actually a beautifully made parable about commitment, and curiously one of Buñuel's most moving films."
