= Christian Liger =

French writer

- Born: 24 August 1935; Nîmes
- Died: 3 December 2002 (aged 67); Nîmes
- Occupation: Writer

Christian Liger (24 August 1935 – 3 December 2002) was a 20th-century French writer.

== Biography ==
Christian Liger studied in Nîmes then at the University of Montpellier. He earned his doctorate in letters with a thesis entitled Les débuts d’André Suarès.

After he was active as a teacher then University professor, he devoted himself entirely to writing: novels, essays, theater.

His last work, Le Roman de Rossel (fictionalized biography of the officer Minister for War of the Paris Commune, Louis-Nathaniel Rossel), was awarded:

- The Grand Prix du Livre d'Histoire de la Société des Gens de Lettres 1998
- The bourse Goncourt de la Biographie 1998, unanimously bestowed on Saturday 26 September in Nancy.
- The prix Michel Dard 1999.

Christian Liger was a member of the Académie de Nîmes.

== Theatre ==
Author

- 1963: Le Sorcier, directed by Marie-Claire Valène at Théâtre du Tertre in Paris
- 1969: La Tour d'Einstein, directed by Pierre Fresnay and Julien Bertheau

Adaptator

- 1975: Jésus II, after Joseph Delteil, directed by Jacques Échantillon, Tréteaux du Midi

== Works ==
- 1963: Les Noces de Psyché, Éditions Gallimard
- 1984: Histoire d'une famille nîmoise, les Paulhan, Cahiers Jean Paulhan, Gallimard.
- 1987: Nîmes sans visa : portrait d'une ville, Ramsay.
- 1992: Trois jours de chasse en montagne, Ed. Robert Laffont.
- 1996: Les Marches du Palais, Ed. Robert Laffont.
- 1998: Le Roman de Rossel, Ed. Robert Laffont.
- 1999: La Nuit de Faraman, Ed. Robert Laffont.
- 2001: Il se mit à courir le long du rivage, Ed. Robert Laffont.
- 2010: Nouvelles de l'exil, Atelier baie.

== Bibliography ==
- Bastide, Bernard; Paulhan, Claire (2008). "Christian Liger, guide sensible et érudit". Balade dans le Gard;sur les pas des écrivains. Les écrivains vagabondent (in French). Paris: Alexandrines. pp. 186–191. ISBN 978-2-370890-01-6.
- Velay, Serge; Boissard, Michel; Bernié-Boissard, Catherine (2009). Petit dictionnaire des écrivains du Gard (in French). Nîmes: Alcide. pp. 153–154.
