= Gabrielle Réjane =

French actress (1856–1920)

- Réjane as Yvonne Derive in Le Béguin (1900)
- Born: Gabrielle Charlotte Réju; 6 June 1856; Paris, France
- Died: 14 June 1920 (aged 64); Paris, France
- Occupations: Actress; Theatre proprietor
- Years active: 1875–1920 (acting); 1906–1918 (theatre proprietor)
- Spouse: Paul Porel (m. 1893; div. 1905)
- Children: 2

Gabrielle Réjane (French pronunciation: [ɡabʁijɛl ʁeʒan]), née Gabrielle Charlotte Réju (6 June 1856 – 14 June 1920), was a French actress of the late 19th and early 20th centuries.

The daughter of a former actor, Réjane studied at the Paris Conservatoire and made her stage debut in 1875. After eight seasons at the Théâtre du Vaudeville in increasingly prominent roles, she became leading lady at the Théâtre des Variétés, a position she combined with appearances in more substantial plays at other theatres. She became known chiefly for her roles in comedies, but made an impression in serious character parts from time to time. Her biggest success was as Catherine, the outspoken washerwoman who becomes a duchess in the historical comedy-drama Madame Sans-Gêne by Sardou and Moreau. She created the role in 1893 and played it frequently for much of her career. Among her other celebrated roles was Nora in Henrik Ibsen's A Doll's House in 1894, which gave the author his first success in France.

Réjane appeared in major cities throughout Europe, and was particularly popular in London, where she played frequently between 1877 and 1915. She twice played on Broadway, but did not become popular with American audiences. She married the director of the Vaudeville, and starred there, but after their divorce in 1905 she opened her own theatre, which she ran until 1918. Between 1900 and 1920 she appeared in six silent films, including two versions of Madame Sans-Gêne. She was widely regarded as the embodiment of the Parisienne, and when she died in 1920 Le Figaro said that Paris had lost its soul.

== Life and career ==
=== Early years ===
Réjane aged 16

Réjane was born in Paris on 6 June 1856. Her father, a former actor, was on the front-of-house staff of the Théâtre de l'Ambigu-Comique. (Note: Accounts vary as to Réju's position at the Ambigu: either running the buffet, collecting tickets, or contrôlleur of the theatre.) He died when Réjane was about five, leaving his widow in straitened circumstances. She obtained a post at another Parisian theatre, and the young Réjane painted fans to augment the family income. In 1870–71 her education, at the Pension Boulet, was interrupted by the Siege of Paris and the bloody events of the Commune. After the fighting ended she returned to her studies and was appointed as a paid assistant to look after the younger pupils.

Réjane had ambitions to go on the stage, and, having obtained a reluctant consent from her mother, she successfully applied to François-Joseph Regnier, a distinguished actor and teacher, for admission to his class at the Paris Conservatoire. In 1874 she won the Conservatoire's deuxième prix (second prize) for comedy. The critic Francisque Sarcey held that she deserved the premier prix, but "A first prize carries with it the right of entrance into the Comédie-Française, and the jury did not think Mademoiselle Réjane, with her little wide-awake face, suited to the vast frame of the House of Molière".

According to the official regulations, Réjane, as a winner of the deuxième prix, was required to join the company of France's second national theatre, the Odéon, but she preferred the repertoire and better pay at the Théâtre du Vaudeville, and the Odéon management did not press the point. She made her debut at the Vaudeville in 1875 in the prologue to the Revue des deux-mondes, by Clairville, making an immediate impression. A reviewer commented, "She has the arch and sprightly air of a Parisian grisette, a flexible voice of an agreeable tone, and perfect self-possession – qualities more than sufficient to succeed on the stage". Later in the year she had her first substantial success, as Niquette in the comedy Fanny Lear by Henri Meilhac and Ludovic Halévy. She remained at the Vaudeville for eight seasons, attracting good notices. The established star at the theatre, Julia Bartet, had the lion's share of leading roles, but Réjane made her mark. The critic Dauphin Meunier later wrote:

Shall I show her as the sly soubrette in Fanny Lear? as the woman in love, "whose ignorance divines all things", in Madame Lili? as the comical Marquise de Menu-Castel in Le Verglas? Shall I tell of her first crowning success, when she played Gabrielle in Pierre?

In 1877 Réjane made the first of many appearances in London. (Note: In her Who's Who in the Theatre entry Réjane listed her first London appearance as 1894, but numerous press articles from the 1870s and 80s contradict this. Another incorrect date in the article – and in Réjane's main Who's Who article – is her year of birth, which she gave as 1857.) Parisian theatres customarily closed for a few weeks during the height of summer, and in July, with Vaudeville colleagues, she played at the Gaiety Theatre in the West End in the comedies Perfide comme l'onde, Nos alliées and Aux crochets d'un gendre. (Note: In English, respectively, "Perfidious, Like a Wave", "Our Allies" and "On the Hooks of a Son-in-law", according to Google Translate.) The Athenaeum applauded "a display of vivacity and espièglerie quite exceptional on the part of Mdlle Réjane", and The Morning Post found her "infinitely diverting".

=== Variétés and stardom ===
As Riquette in Ma cousine, 1890

In 1882, the year after the retirement of Hortense Schneider, star of the Théâtre des Variétés, Réjane was engaged as leading lady there. Her contract at the Variétés allowed her to appear in more serious roles in other theatres, and in 1883 Sarah Bernhardt, who was then running the Ambigu, cast her in the central role of Jean Richepin's La Glu; (Note: "Glu" is French for "birdlime"; "La Glu" is the nickname of Réjane's character, a demi-mondaine who prides herself on getting men to attach themselves to her with all the adhesiveness of birdlime.) in that part, and as Adrienne de Boistulbé in Meilhac's Ma camarade at the Théâtre du Palais-Royal in the same year, Réjane attracted highly favourable critical attention. (Note: Le Figaro praised her performance in La Glu despite a suspicion that now and again she was apt to imitate Bernhardt.)

Over the next ten years Réjane appeared at six or more Paris theatres, in an exceptionally wide variety of plays, from new works by Edmond Gondinet (Clara Soleil, 1885), Meilhac (Les demoiselles Clochart, 1886, and Ma cousine, 1890), Victorien Sardou (Marquise, 1889) and Edmond Haraucourt (Shylock, 1889), to revivals of classics by Beaumarchais (Le mariage de Figaro, 1889), Dumas (La Demi-Monde, 1890) and Aristophanes (Lysistrata, 1892). She continually showed the range of her abilities as an actress: in 1887 in Allô-Allô she played a scene grappling with the difficulties of the new-fangled telephone, which, Meunier recalled, was so funny "that from the gallery to the stalls the theatre was one roar of laughter and applause". In the following year she appeared at the Odéon in a stage adaptation of Germinie Lacerteux by the Goncourt brothers. The actor and director André Antoine described her performance:

... an unexpected, unrecognisable Réjane. Here was the elegant Parisienne, hunched and frumpish. in the clothes of a poor maid – so convincingly transformed into the shape of humanity that she had become Germinie Lacerteux herself. ... Above all in the second part, when Germinie, gradually decaying, growing old, trails her grief – is so truly of the people. It was then that the actress finally achieved greatness.

Among those who saw the performance was Marcel Proust who became a devoted admirer, and later friend; his character Berma, the great actress in À la recherche du temps perdu, is partly based on Réjane. (Note: Proust's biographer George D. Painter cites Réjane and Bernhardt as the two originals on whom the novelist based Berma. Réjane herself is mentioned twice in À la recherche du temps perdu: once in comparison with Jeanne Granier and later as a rival of la Berma.)

In 1893 Réjane married Paul Porel, director of the Vaudeville; they had two children – Germaine and Jacques. She appeared at the Vaudeville in a series of successful plays; two of the earliest productions demonstrated her range. In October 1893 she created the role with which she was most closely associated during the rest of her career: Catherine, the outspoken washerwoman-duchess in Sardou and Moreau's historical comedy-drama Madame Sans-Gêne. The critical and public response was enthusiastic. In Le Figaro, Henry Fouquier judged that Réjane had turned an artificial character into something delicious, feminine and overwhelming. Another reviewer wrote:

As Catherine, Duchesse de Dantzig, in Madame Sans-Gêne

Madame Réjane, who played the extremely difficult title rôle of the piece, gained a distinct personal triumph by sheer dint of clever acting. She invested the character of the vulgar but honest Duchesse de Dantzig with a thousand sympathetic and laughable traits, many of which were conceived in the highest spirit of comedy. She was by turns fascinating and espiègle ... pathetic ... subtly diplomatic ... proud almost to sublimity ... and all the time she never ceases to be the restless, talkative gamine of the Paris streets. ... People will crowd to the Vaudeville if it is only for the purpose of seeing Réjane in the character of Madame Sans-Gêne.

Six months later Réjane played Nora in the French premiere of Henrik Ibsen's A Doll's House ("Une maison de poupée"). Ibsen had never succeeded with Parisian audiences until now, but to his delight the production was a triumph. (Note: Ibsen sent Réjane a telegram: "My dream has come true: Réjane has created Nora" ("Mon rêve est realisé, Réjane a créé Nora").) Les annales du théâtre et de la musique recorded, "Nora's role is overwhelming; Mademoiselle Réjane took the opportunity of one of the greatest successes of her career. She was able to highlight the very complex character of the role, and with a rare simplicity of means she demonstrated in the famous tarantella scene an admirable dramatic power. Needless to say, it was acclaimed". Another contemporary critic wrote:

The range and delicacy of her playing were equally remarkable, and it was extraordinary with what consummate ease she passed from the lightest gaiety and espièglerie through a thousand varying and contrasting phases of passion and sentiment to the final tragic heights of her soul-awakening when she perceives the mistake of her life and refuses any longer to be a mere doll dandled in the strong arms of her somewhat coarse-grained husband. So complete, incisive, and at the same time exquisitely charming an exposition of Ibsen's subtly drawn character of Nora has probably never been given before.

=== London and New York ===
In 1894 Réjane returned to the West End. Since her first appearance there, in 1877, she had been in a production of Alphonse Daudet's Le Nabab at the Gaiety in 1883. Her reviews then had been good, but her return in June 1894 in Madame Sans-Gêne prompted superlatives from the critics and drew full houses, even with the counter-attraction of a Bernhardt season at Daly's Theatre. (Note: The Graphic commented that in matching the attraction of a Bernhardt season in London, Réjane had achieved what the great comic actor Coquelin had failed to accomplish two years before.) Réjane's season had to be extended by a fortnight to meet demand.

A Doll's House, included in Réjane's 1895 New York season

In February 1895 Réjane opened at Abbey's Theatre in New York for a season comprising Madame Sans-Gêne, Divorçons, Sapho, Ma cousine and A Doll's House. Reviews for Réjane were excellent, but less so for the plays, and audiences were unresponsive: as an American commentator put it, "The language was, of course, one stumbling block, for a keen understanding of the foreign tongue was more necessary for a taste for Réjane than for the broad effects, say, of a Bernhardt". Among those in the audience who understood the words there was a substantial section whose broadness of mind did not extend to the content of French plays. The New York Times later commented that Réjane was "hampered by the moral bias of American audiences". (Note: The British journal The Theatre suggested another possible reason why New York audiences stayed away: in contrast with London, where theatre managements made a point of keeping to their usual ticket prices when Réjane's company was playing, the Broadway management doubled the prices of admission.)

Réjane was so disgusted at the lack of appreciation that she vowed never to return. She took her company back to Paris via London, where they played a season of most of the same plays to full houses at the Garrick Theatre. Madame Sans-Gêne was once again an immense success, and Sir Henry Irving negotiated the rights to stage an English version, which he produced at the Lyceum Theatre with Ellen Terry in Réjane's role two years later. (Note: When Terry played Catherine in J. Comyns Carr's English version in 1897, the drama critic of The Morning Post praised her performance highly for "its fidelity to human nature", but added that Terry was "replete with life and spirit and bonhomie, but she is not a Parisian blanchisseuse".)

Réjane eventually relented and agreed to return to the US, but not until 1904, by which time she had been seen by audiences in Belgium, Denmark, the Netherlands, Germany, Russia, Austria, Romania, Italy, Spain and Portugal. In the meanwhile, at home her marriage was disintegrating, and in 1905 she and Porel were divorced. The children remained with her. The Vaudeville, under Porel's management, being now closed to her, Réjane decided to go into management on her own account.

=== Théâtre Réjane and later years ===
Théâtre Réjane programme: L'oiseau-bleu, 1911

Réjane was not long without a theatrical base. In 1906 the writer Arnold Bennett, then resident in Paris, wrote:

She took hold of the Nouveau Théâtre, the unlikeliest and one of the most uncomfortable theatres ... She removed everything from within its four walls, and presently frequenters of the Rue Blanche observed that the legend Théâtre Réjane had been carved on its façade. ... [Everyone] went, and discovered the wonderfullest theatre in the town, incredibly spacious, with lounges as big as the auditorium, wide corridors, and a scheme of decoration at once severe and splendid. Réjane was written all over it, even in the costumes of the women attendants. Paris was charmed, astounded, electrified; and now Réjane flames a more brilliant jewel than ever in the forehead of the capital.

At the Théâtre Réjane its proprietor appeared in twenty new plays and revivals by playwrights ranging from the grandiose Catulle Mendès to the chic Sacha Guitry between 1906 and 1910 (Note: La souris ("The Mouse", Édouard Pailleron), Heureux ("Happy", Pailleron), La rafale ("The Gust", Henri Bernstein), La suzeraine (Dario Niccodemi, La piste ("The Track", Sardou), Le masque (Henry Bataille), Le joug ("The Yoke", Albert Guinon and Jane Marny), Antoinette Sabrier (Romain Coolus), Après le pardon ("After Forgiveness", Matilde Serao and Pierre Decourcelle), La Savelli (Max Maurey and Gilbert Thierry), Le monde ou l'on s'ennuie ("The World Where We are Bored", Pailleron), Paris – New York (Francis de Croisset), La clef ("The Key", Sacha Guitry), Israël (Bernstein), Le refuge (Niccodemi), L'Impératrice ("The Empress", Catulle Mendès), Madame Margot (Emile Moreau and Charles Clairville), Trains de luxe (Abel Hermant), La risque ("The Risk", Coolus) and La flamme ("The Flame", Niccodemi).) – "none of them, perhaps, a new Sans-Gêne or Marquise", according to her biographer Forrest Izzard, "but each serving to keep in vigorous use one of the rarest talents of the time". Réjane did not appear in every production at her theatre; she was not in the cast of the French premiere of Maurice Maeterlinck's play The Blue Bird ("L'oiseau bleu"), given at the Théâtre Réjane in March 1911. Nor did she confine her appearances in Paris to her own theatre; in 1911 and 1916 she appeared at the Théâtre de la Porte Saint-Martin in Henry Bataille's L'enfant de l'amour and L'amazone.

As well as her base in Paris, Réjane hoped to found a French repertory theatre in London. A first step was made in 1906 with a season at the Royalty Theatre, but the plan was not taken further. Réjane sold her Paris theatre in 1918, after which its name was changed to the Théâtre de Paris. (Note: The smaller auditorium in the building, the 300-seat Petit Théâtre de Paris, was renamed the Salle Réjane in 2014 in honour of the former proprietor.)

Réjane took part in six silent films. Two were versions of Madame Sans-Gêne, the first directed by Clément Maurice, 1900, and the second by André Calmettes, 1911. The others were Britannicus (Calmettes, 1908), L'Assomoir (Albert Capellani, 1909), Alsace (Henri Pouctal, 1916) and Miarka (Louis Mercanton, 1920).

During the First World War, Réjane devoted much effort to helping the Allied cause, and she appeared at the Royal Court Theatre, London, in a patriotic drama called Alsace, and at the London Coliseum in a war-play entitled The Bet. She was made a Chevalier of the Legion of Honour, an event celebrated in February 1920 by a luncheon at the Théâtre de Paris, presided over by President-elect Paul Deschanel.

Réjane died of influenza in Paris on 14 June 1920, aged 64. The following day the front page of Le Figaro bore the words, "Réjane est morte... Du silence, messieurs et mesdames du Paris de 1920, un peu de silence. Et pour nous, des larmes. Nous perdons l'âme de Paris". – Réjane is dead. ... Silence, gentlemen and ladies of Paris, 1920, a little silence. And for us, tears. We lose the soul of Paris".

== Gallery ==
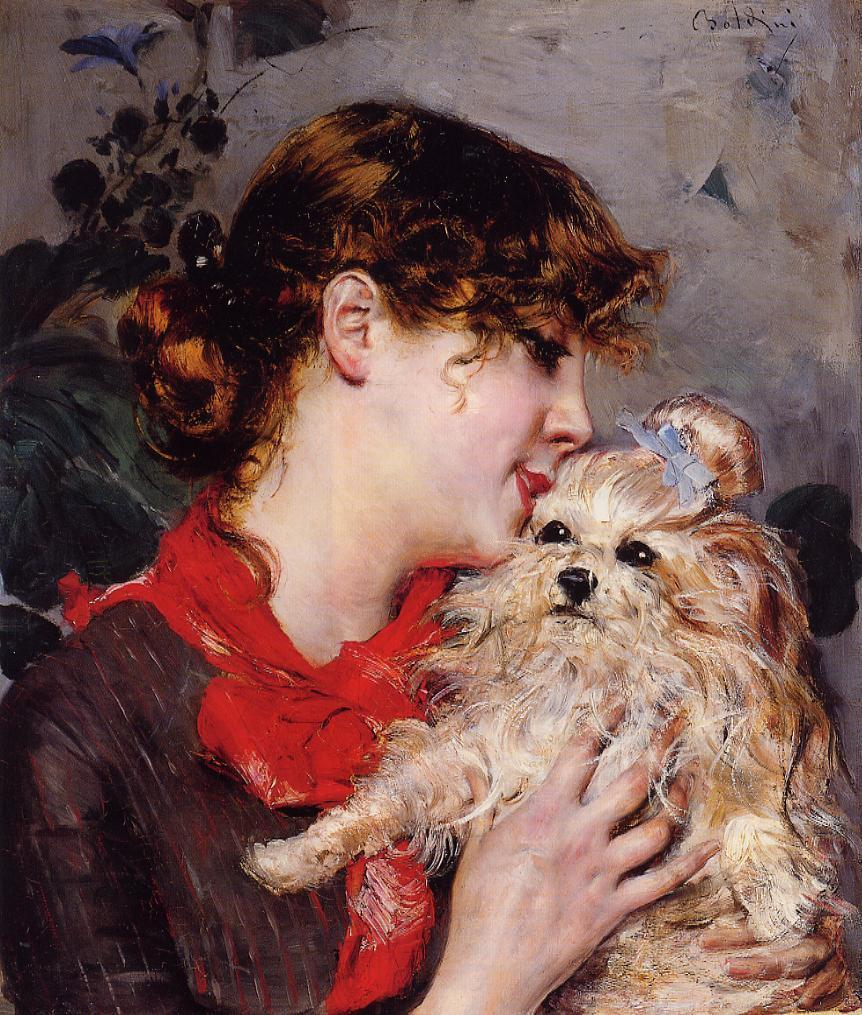
The Actress Rejane and her Dog (c. 1885), by Giovanni Boldini

In Ma camarade, 1883

Columbine in Pierrot assassin
1883

Le Chic in Le coeur de Paris
1887

Lysistrata
1892

Sapho
1892

Nora in A Doll's House
1894

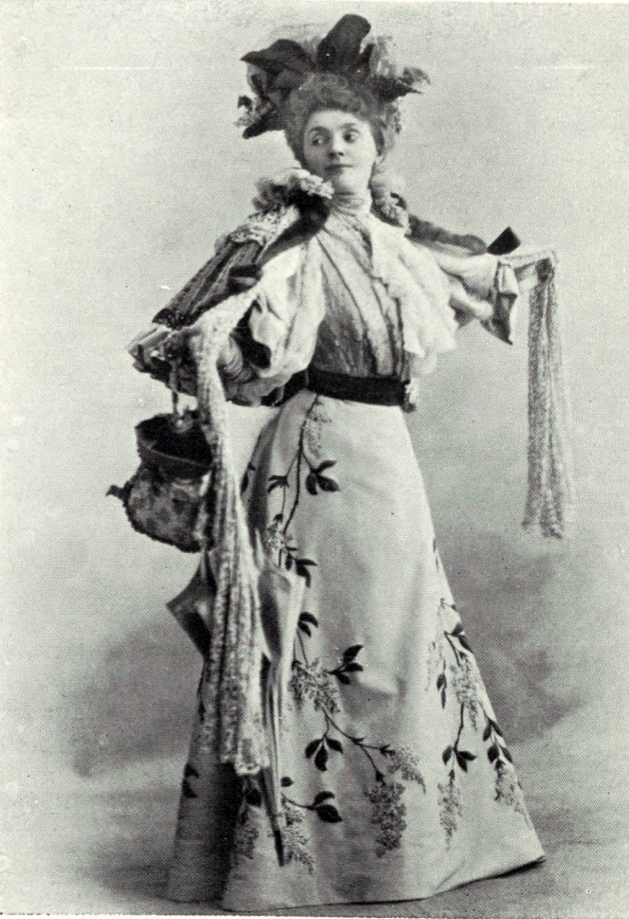
Mme Blandin in Viveurs
1895

Yvonne Derive in Le Béguin
1900

== Notes, references and sources ==
=== Sources ===
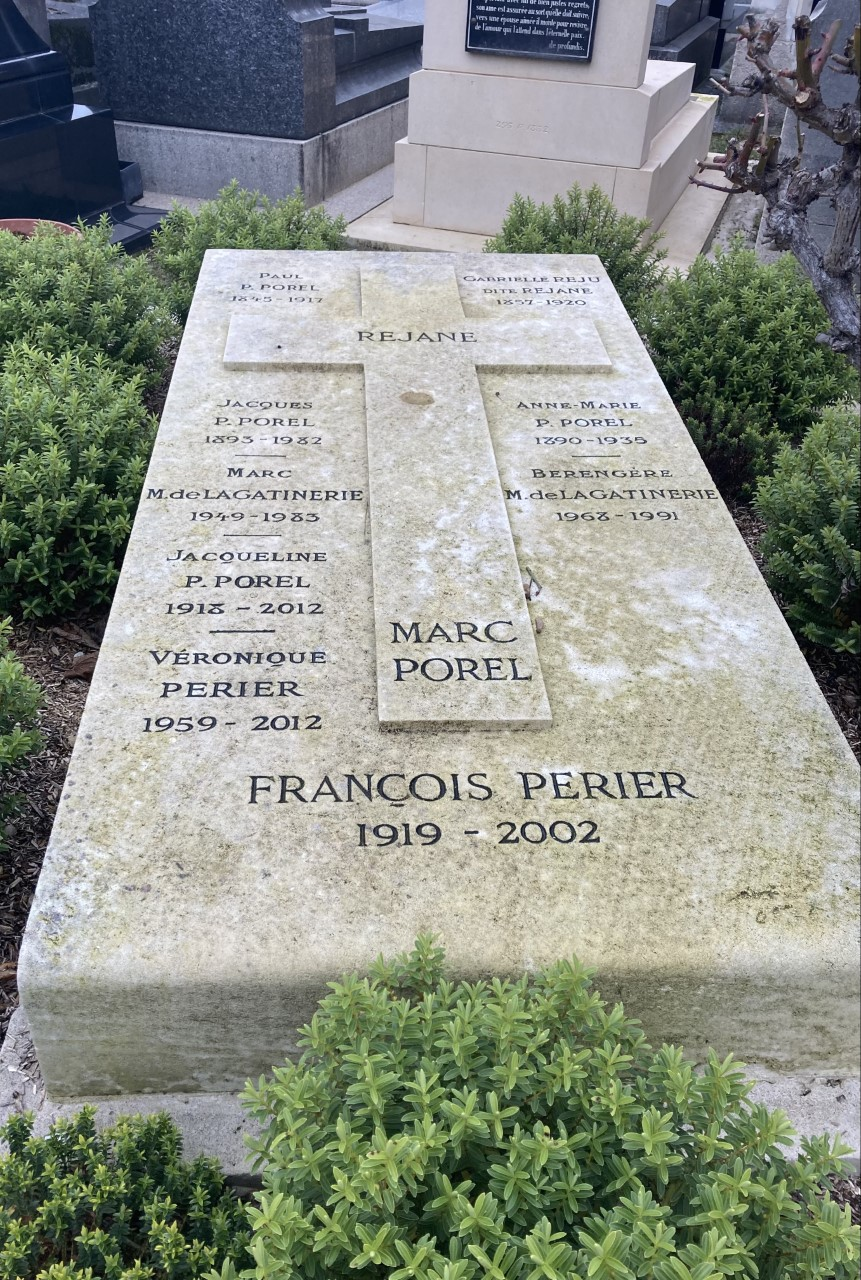
Grave in Passy Cemetery (Paris).

- Hemmings, F. W. J. (2006). The Theatre Industry in Nineteenth-Century France. Cambridge: Cambridge University Press. ISBN 978-0-521-03501-9.
- Izzard, Forrest (1915). Heroines of the Modern Stage. New York: Sturgis and Walton. OCLC 1046041361.
- Linn, John G. (1966). The Theater in the Fiction of Marcel Proust. Columbus: Ohio State University Press. OCLC 1069876989.
- Maeterlinck, Maurice (1911). L'oiseau bleu: féerie en six actes et douze tableaux. Paris: Fasquelle. OCLC 810615239.
- Meyer, Michael (1971). Ibsen: A Biography. New York: Doubleday. OCLC 1035620415.
- Noël, Edouard; Edmond Stoullig (1884). Les annales du théâtre et de la musique: 1883 (in French). Paris: G. Charpentier. OCLC 762324893.
- Noël, Edouard; Edmond Stoullig (1895). Les annales du théâtre et de la musique: 1894 (in French). Paris: G. Charpentier. OCLC 762457132.
- Painter, George D. (1965). Proust: The Early Years. London: Chatto and Windus. OCLC 977845986.
- Parker, John; Freda Gaye; Ian Herbert (1978). Who Was Who in the Theatre, 1912–1976, compiled from Who's Who in the Theatre, volumes 1–15. Detroit: Gale. ISBN 978-0-8103-0406-2.
- Stokes, John (2005). The French Actress and Her English Audience. Cambridge: Cambridge University Press. ISBN 978-0-521-84300-3.
- Sutton, Howard (1961). The Life and Work of Jean Richepin. Geneva and Paris: Librairie Droz and Librairie Minard. ISBN 978-2-600-03458-6.
