= Talmay =

- Commune
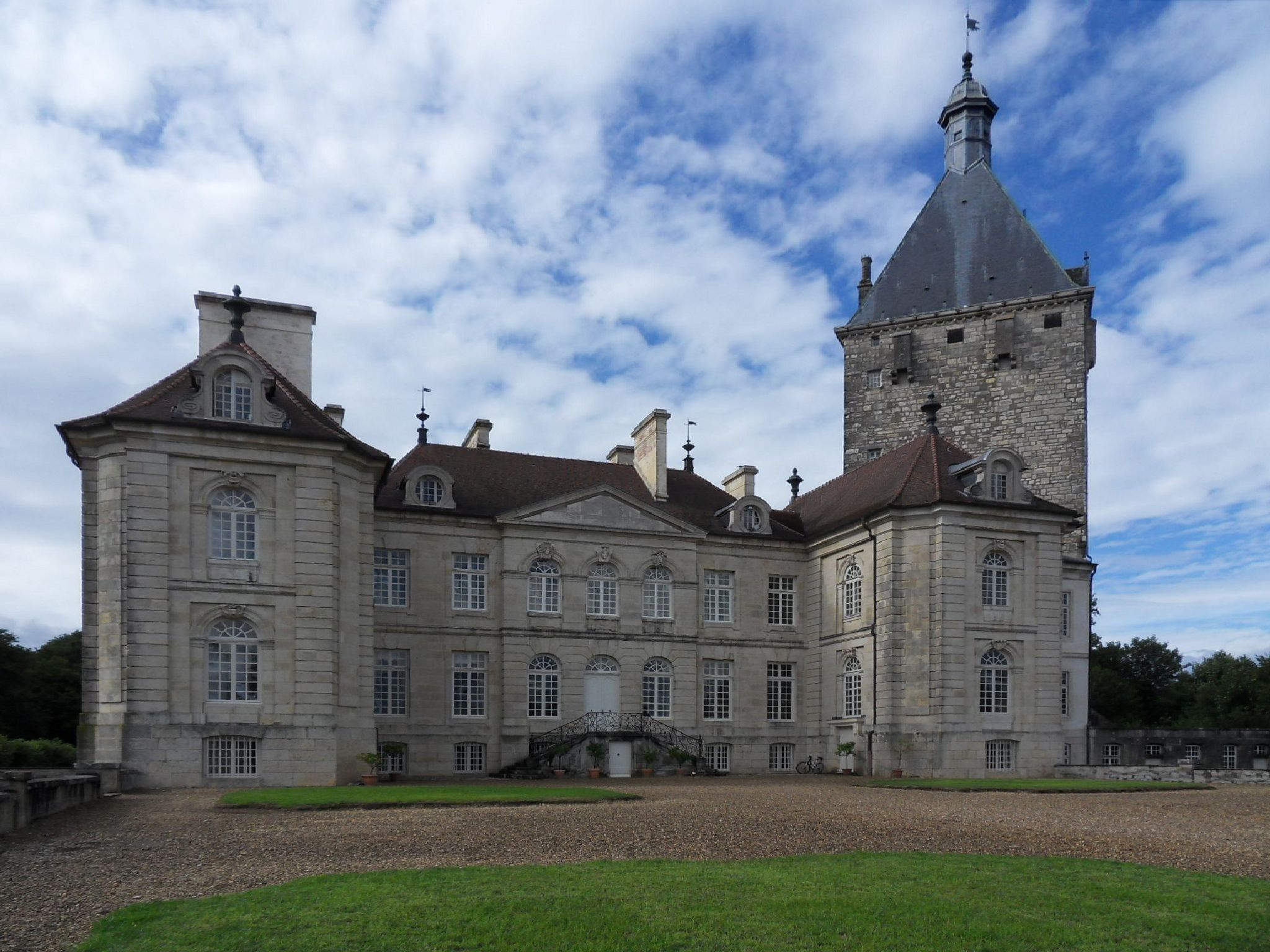
- The chateau in Talmay

- Coat of arms
- Location of Talmay
- Location within France Location within Bourgogne-Franche-Comté
- Coordinates: 47°21′20″N 5°26′23″E
- Country: France
- Region: Bourgogne-Franche-Comté
- Department: Côte-d'Or
- Arrondissement: Dijon
- Canton: Auxonne

Government
  - Mayor (2020–2026): Annick Pernin
- Area^{1}: 22.04 km^{2} (8.51 sq mi)
- Elevation: 193 m (633 ft)
- Highest elevation: 246 m (807 ft)
- Lowest elevation: 184 m (604 ft)
- Population (2023): 528
  - Density: 24.0/km^{2} (62.0/sq mi)
- Time zone: UTC+01:00 (CET)
  - Summer (DST): UTC+02:00 (CEST)
- INSEE/Postal code: 21618 /21270
- ^{1} French Land Register data, which excludes lakes, ponds, glaciers > 1 km^{2} (0.386 sq mi or 247 acres) and river estuaries.

Talmay (French pronunciation: [talmɛ]) is a commune in the Côte-d'Or department in eastern France.

== Population ==
Historical population
Year	Pop.	±% p.a.
1968	530	—
1975	490	−1.11%
1982	471	−0.56%
1990	521	+1.27%
1999	463	−1.30%
2007	477	+0.37%
2012	562	+3.33%
2017	576	+0.49%
2023	528	−1.44%
Source: INSEE

== Personalities ==
- Marie-Thérèse Figueur (1774-1861) - a French heroine who fought in the French Revolutionary Wars and Napoleonic Wars. Known by her nom de guerre Madame Sans-Gêne.

== See also ==
- Communes of the Côte-d'Or department
