= Henry Becque =

French dramatist (1837–1899)

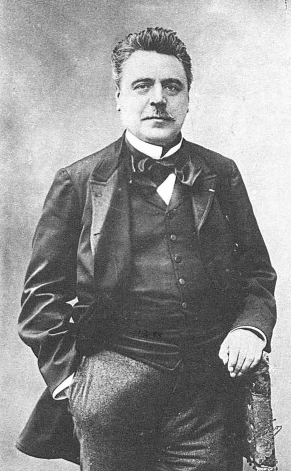
Henry Becque by Nadar

Henry François Becque (9 April 1837 – 12 May 1899), was a French dramatist. He was born in Paris.

== Life ==
In 1867, he wrote, in imitation of Lord Byron, the libretto for Victorin de Joncières's opera Sardanapale, but his first important work, Michel Pauper, appeared in 1870. The importance of this sombre drama was first realized when it was revived at the Odéon in 1886. Les Corbeaux (1882) established Becque's position as an innovator, and in 1885 he produced his most successful play, La Parisienne. Becque produced little during the last years of his life, but his disciples carried on the tradition he had created.

His other works include Querelles littéraires (1890), and Souvenirs d'un auteur dramatique (1895), consisting chiefly of reprinted articles in which he does not spare his opponents. His Théâtre complet (3 vols., 1899) includes L'Enfant prodigue (Vaudeville Theatre, 6 November 1868); Michel Pauper (Théâtre de la Porte-Saint-Martin, 17 June 1870); L'Enlèvement (Vaudeville, 18 November 1871); La Navette (Gymnase, 15 November 1878); Les Honnêtes Femmes (Gymnase, 1 January 1880); Les Corbeaux (Comédie-Française, 14 September 1882); and La Parisienne (Théâtre de la Renaissance, 7 February 1885).

== Reputation ==
English novelist Arnold Bennett wrote in 1910 that Henri Becque was one of the great dramatists of the 19th century, but that "no first-class modern French author is more perfectly unknown and uncared-for in England than Henri Becque."

== Notes and references ==
Attribution:
