= Simone Le Bargy =

French actress and woman of letters

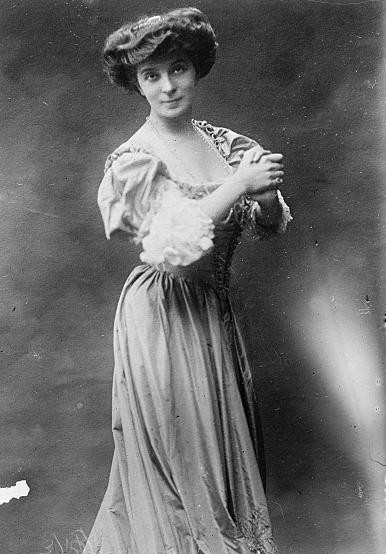
Madame Simone in 1911

Simone Le Bargy (3 April 1877 – 17 October 1985), born Pauline Benda but better known by her stage and pen name, Madame Simone, was a French actress and woman of letters.

== Biography ==
Born into a Parisian family of Jewish bourgeoisie, Benda was a cousin of the writer Julien Benda. She made her stage debut in 1902 and played parts for Henri Bernstein, Luigi Pirandello, Henry Bataille, Georges de Porto-Riche and François Porché, her late husband. She took after Sarah Bernhardt in the role of L'Aiglon's Edmond Rostand and participated in the creation of Chantecler in 1910.

In 1898, she married her diction teacher Charles Le Bargy at the church of Saint-Philippe-du-Roule. He was more than twice her age. After her divorce from him, she took the name "Simone Le Bargy". She remarried, in 1909, Claude Casimir-Perier, son of former President of the Republic Jean Casimir-Perier. She was the friend of many celebrities of her time and, from 1909, she received the great literary figures of the time, like her later lover Alain-Fournier, his friend Charles Péguy, and Jean Cocteau at the castle of the Trie-City.

The most striking feature of her personal life is her brief and passionate affair that began 29 May 1913 with Alain-Fournier, whom she met while he was secretary of her second husband. He was killed 12 January 1915 on the front of the Aisne. Alain-Fournier was killed while leading his company 22 September 1914, during a reconnaissance of the German lines.

She married a third time, to the author François Porché, which she says in his memoirs was a marriage based on their respective common point following for each of them, a passion rudely interrupted.

She lived 108 years, and was a jury member of the Prix Femina from 1935 to 1985, literary salon, friendships and Parisian influences, writing novels, memoirs (Grand Prize for Literature of academy in 1960). Her unhappy first marriage with actor Le Bargy seems to have served as a model for Jean Cocteau's Bel Indifferent.

She died at a retreat in the Basque Country in October 1985.

== Publications ==
- Le Désordre, Paris, Plon, 1930.
- Jours de colère, Paris, Plon, 1935.
- Le Paradis terrestre, Paris, Gallimard, 1935.
- Québéfi, Genève, éd. du Milieu du monde, 1943.
- Le Bal des ardents, Paris, Plon, 1951.
- L'Autre roman, Paris, Plon, 1954.
- Sous de nouveaux soleils, Paris, Gallimard, 1957.
- Ce qui restait à dire, Paris, Gallimard, 1967.
- Mon nouveau testament, Paris, Gallimard, 1970.
- Correspondance 1912-1914, avec Alain-Fournier, édité par Claude Sicard, Paris, Fayard, 1992.
