= Madame Sans-Gêne (opera) =

- Opera by Umberto Giordano
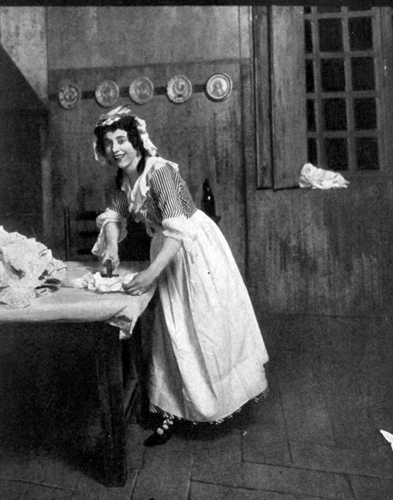
- Geraldine Farrar as Caterina Hubscher in the opera's premiere
- Librettist: Renato Simoni
- Premiere: 25 January 1915; Metropolitan Opera, New York

Madame Sans-Gêne is an opera in three acts by Umberto Giordano. The libretto was taken from Victorien Sardou and Émile Moreau's 1893 play, and adapted for the opera by Renato Simoni.

== Performance history ==
Its première took place at the Metropolitan Opera on 25 January 1915, conducted by Arturo Toscanini with Geraldine Farrar in the title role, Giovanni Martinelli as Lefêbvre, and Pasquale Amato as Napoleon. This was followed by a performance in Turin under Ettore Panizza with Farneti, Grassi and Riccardo Stracciari on 28 February 1915.

== Roles ==
Role	Voice type	Premiere Cast, 25 January 1915 (Conductor: Arturo Toscanini )
Caterina Hubscher, laundress, then Duchess of Danzig	soprano	Geraldine Farrar
Lefebvre, sergeant, then Duke of Danzig	tenor	Giovanni Martinelli
Fouché	baritone	Andrés De Segurola
Count Neipperg	tenor	Paul Althouse
Napoléon	baritone	Pasquale Amato
Toniotta, laundress	soprano	Leonora Sparkes
Giulia, laundress	soprano	Rita Fornia
La Rossa, laundress	soprano	Sophie Braslau
Vinaigre, drummer	tenor	Max Bloch
Queen Carolina	soprano	Vera Curtis
Princess Elisa	soprano	Minnie Egener
Despréaux, dancing master	tenor	Angelo Badà
Gelsomino, valet	baritone	Riccardo Tegani
Leroy, tailor	baritone	Robert Leonhardt
De Brigode, court chamberlain	baritone	Vincenzo Reschiglian
Madame de Bülow, lady at court	soprano	Rita Fornia
Roustan, head of the Mamelukes	baritone	Bernard Bégué
Townspeople, shopkeepers, national guards, soldiers, diplomats and others

== Synopsis ==
=== Act 1 ===
Paris. 10 August 1792, the day of the capture of the Tuileries during the French Revolution

There is a squabble in the laundry of Caterina Hubscher, a beautiful Alsacian girl, a very free and easy-mannered woman whom everyone calls "Madame Sans-Gêne" (Madame Carefree). One of her customers is Fouché (later Minister of Police under Napoleon), whom Caterina dislikes; another, a quiet young officer who lives nearby, is Napoleon himself. As Caterina is about to close her laundry, a wounded Austrian officer arrives and asks for her help, Caterina hides him in her room. The officer turns out to be the Count of Neipperg. Sergeant Lefebvre, Caterina's fiancé, arrives with more soldiers and is suspicious when he sees the doors closed. He discovers Neipperg but tells his men that there is no one in the room, and to leave. Once alone with Caterina, he helps her to assist the Count.

=== Act 2 ===
The castle of Compiègne. September 1811

Napoléon is at the height of his career. Lefebvre has distinguished himself in many battles, and has become a Marshal of France. For his success in the siege of Danzig, Napoléon has made him Duke of Danzig. Caterina, the former laundress, is his wife of many years, and now a duchess, but her demeanor has not changed and causes scandals in court. The Emperor orders Lefebvre to divorce Caterina and find a more suitable wife. Lefebvre and Caterina are desperate and also worried about their friend Neipperg, who is suspected by the Emperor of an affair with the Empress Marie-Louise. During a reception, Caterina makes a series of gaffes and gets into a fight with the Emperor's sisters, and the butler announces that the Emperor wishes to see her.

=== Act 3 ===
Napoléon orders Caterina to divorce her husband and to retire from a life that is not suitable for her. Caterina, however, reminisces about the days when she was a laundress, and he only a young officer, and he is moved even though she also reminds him that he still owes her 60 francs for washing. Then Count Neipperg is caught entering the Empress's chambers. Napoléon is furious. He degrades Neipperg from an officer to a common soldier, and orders his immediate execution. Caterina intervenes: she reveals that Neipperg is innocent and he is forgiven. To the astonishment of everyone, the Duchess of Danzig appears in the salon on the arm of the Emperor, to engage in a hunt.

== Recordings ==
Source: Recordings of Madame Sans-Gêne on operadis-opera-discography.org.uk
