= François Porché =

French dramatist, poet and literary critic

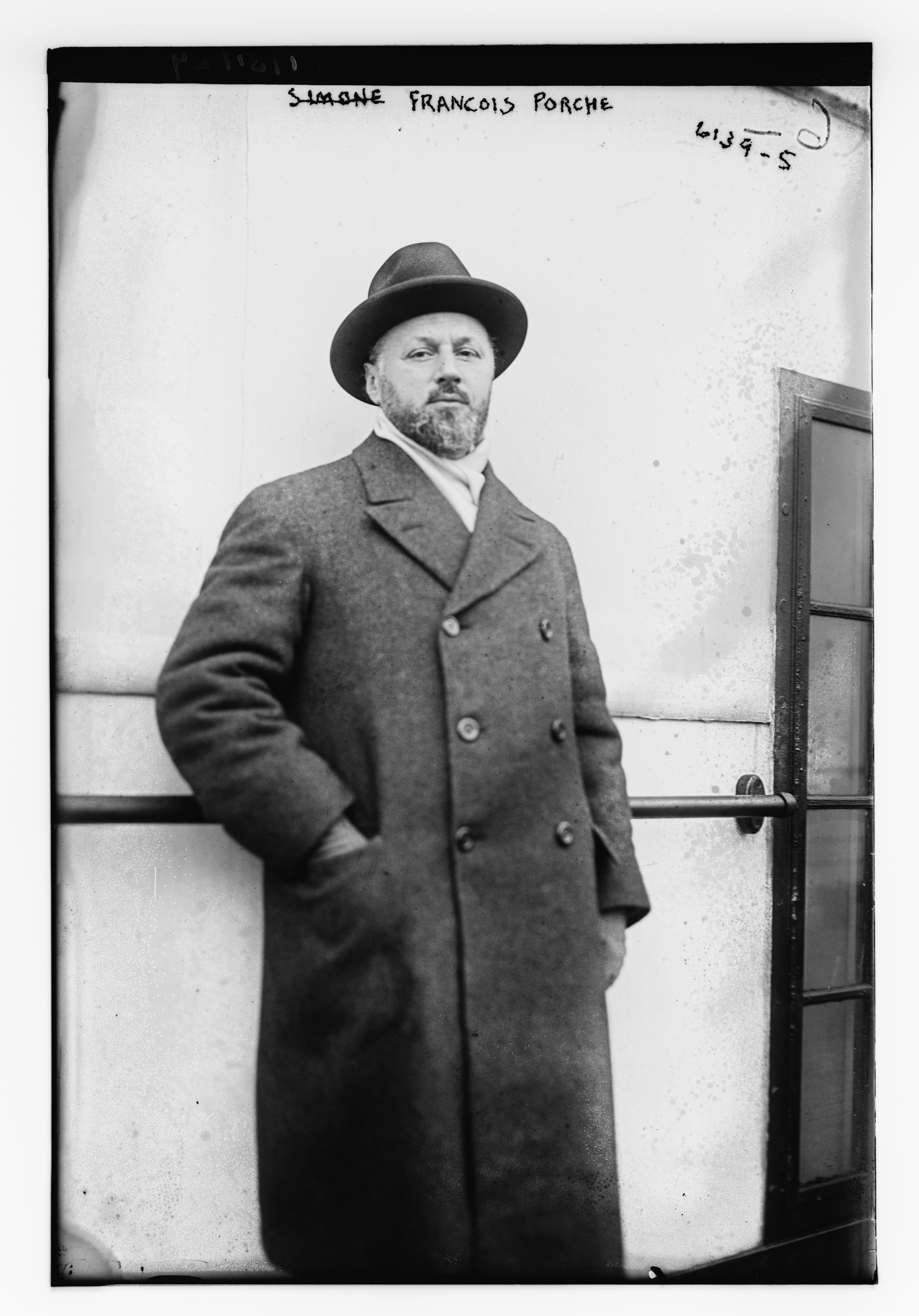
François Porché

François Porché (born Cognac, November 21, 1877 - died Vichy, April 19, 1944) was a French dramatist, poet and literary critic. The French Academy awarded him the Grand Prix de Littérature in 1923. Les Butors et la Finette, a "symbolical and allegorical drama" premiered in 1917, Sam Abramovitch in 1927 (in New York City) and Un roi, deux dames et un valet in 1934. He published a war poem L' Arret sur la Marne in 1916 and a poetry collection called Charles Baudelaire in memory of the poet.

== Selected works ==
- À chaque jour (1904)
- Les Suppliants (1905)
- Au loin, peut-être… (1909)
- Humus et poussière (1911)
- Prisme étrange de la maladie (1912)
- Le Dessous du masque (1914)
- Nous (1914)
- L'Arrêt sur la Marne (1916)
- Le Poème de la tranchée (1916)
- Les Butors et la Finette (1917)
- La Jeune Fille aux joues roses, Théâtre Sarah Bernhardt
- Soumission à la Vénus d'Arles, poème (9 pages), Mercure de France. N° 547, 1er avril 1921
- La Dauphine, comédie en 3 actes (1922)
- Sonates (1923)
- Le Chevalier de Colomb, drame en 3 actes (1923)
- Visite aux Canadiens français (1924)
- Chez nos frères du Canada (1925)
- Qu’est-ce que l’âme slave ? (1925)
- La Vierge au grand cœur, ou la Mission, les travaux et la passion de Jeanne d'Arc, pièce en 3 parties et 8 tableaux, mise en scène Simone Le Bargy, Théâtre de la Renaissance, 27
- Paul Valéry et la poésie pure (1926)
- La Vie douloureuse de Charles Baudelaire (1926)
- Sam Abramovitch (1927)
- L'amour qui n'ose pas dire son nom (1927)
- L'Evolution poétique de M. Henri de Régnier (1928)
- Humoristes, cubistes et surréalistes (1928)
- Mirages de l'Argent (1929)
- Poètes français depuis Verlaine (1929)
- Tsar Lénine, mystère en trois actes et un épilogue (1930)
- Les Dernières Années de Verlaine (1932)
- Franc-Nohain poète ou l'esprit des choses (1932)
- La Jeunesse bourgeoise de Paul Verlaine (1932)
- La Race errante, drame en 3 actes et 6 tableaux, (1932)
- Tristan Bernard, auteur classique (1932)
- La Crise du théâtre (1933)
- Verlaine et sa vieille mère (1933)
- Verlaine tel qu'il fut (1933)
- La Jeunesse de Léon Tolstoï (1935)
- Orage sur la Comédie-Française (1935)
- Portrait psychologique de Tolstoï (de la naissance à la mort), 1828-1910 (1935)
- Un roi, deux dames et un valet, pièce en 4 actes : d'après un récit inédit de Mme Simone (1935), Comédie des Champs-Elysées, 1934
- Baudelaire : histoire d'une âme (1944)
