= Madame Sans-Gêne (play) =

Catherine in her laundry – the prologue in the original 1893 production

Madame Sans-Gêne is a historical comedy-drama by Victorien Sardou and Émile Moreau, concerning incidents in the life of Catherine Hübscher, an outspoken 18th-century laundress who became the Duchess of Danzig. The play is described by its authors as "three acts with a prologue" ("Comédie en trois Actes, précédée d'un prologue").

It premiered at the Théâtre du Vaudeville, Paris, on 27 October 1893, starring Réjane in the title role. The play was revived many times in France and toured in the English provinces in 1897. It was also adapted as an opera, in 1915, and several times for film.

== Synopsis ==
The first scene of the play is set in Catherine Hübscher's laundry in the Rue Sainte-Anne, Paris, on 10 August 1792. Catherine, who always speaks her mind, is known as "Madame Sans-Gêne" of which an approximate English translation is "Madame Without-Embarrassment". She is engaged to Sergeant Lefebvre, a member of the Revolutionary forces. She rescues a young Austrian nobleman, Count Neipperg, from the pursuing militia. Lefebvre has the chance to betray Neipperg's hidden presence, but respects Catherine's desire to protect him. Once the hue and cry has died down they help him escape.

Réjane as Catherine (centre right) and Madeleine Verneuil and Camille-Gabrielle Drunzer, left, as Napoleon's sisters

The rest of the play is set at the Château de Compiègne in September 1811, during the reign of Napoleon I. Lefebvre, who has married Catherine, has distinguished himself in the army and has been appointed Marshal of the Empire and Duke of Danzig. He and his wife are visited by Neipperg, who has been at the French court (where the Empress, Marie Louise, is Austrian) but is now obliged to leave, suspected of having an affair with the wife of a high-ranking Frenchman.

At a soirée, Catherine – sans-gêne as ever – offends the emperor's sisters and the ladies of the court by her plain speaking. Napoleon tells Lefebvre that it is his duty to divorce Catherine and marry someone more suitable, reminding him that he himself renounced his beloved Joséphine to remarry for duty. Lefebvre refuses. Napoleon sends for Catherine, who reminds him of her past contributions to the Revolutionary cause in general and to Napoleon in particular: she nonplusses him by producing an old laundry bill of his that she had permitted to go unpaid when he was a penniless young soldier. She wins him round from anger to flirtatious good humour, and he agrees to drop the suggestion of divorce.

Neipperg is apprehended in suspicious circumstances that make it seem that he is the lover of the empress. Napoleon orders his execution. The Lefebvres and their friend Joseph Fouché are compromised by their association with Neipperg. Fouché's enemy Savary hopes to encompass their disgrace, but proof of Neipperg's innocence comes to light at the last moment. Napoleon congratulates Fouché on his cleverness, but has to agree when Fouché tells him that in Catherine he has found someone still cleverer. The idea of a divorce is firmly ruled out, Fouché and the Lefebvres are restored to favour, and Savary is dismissed.

== Productions ==
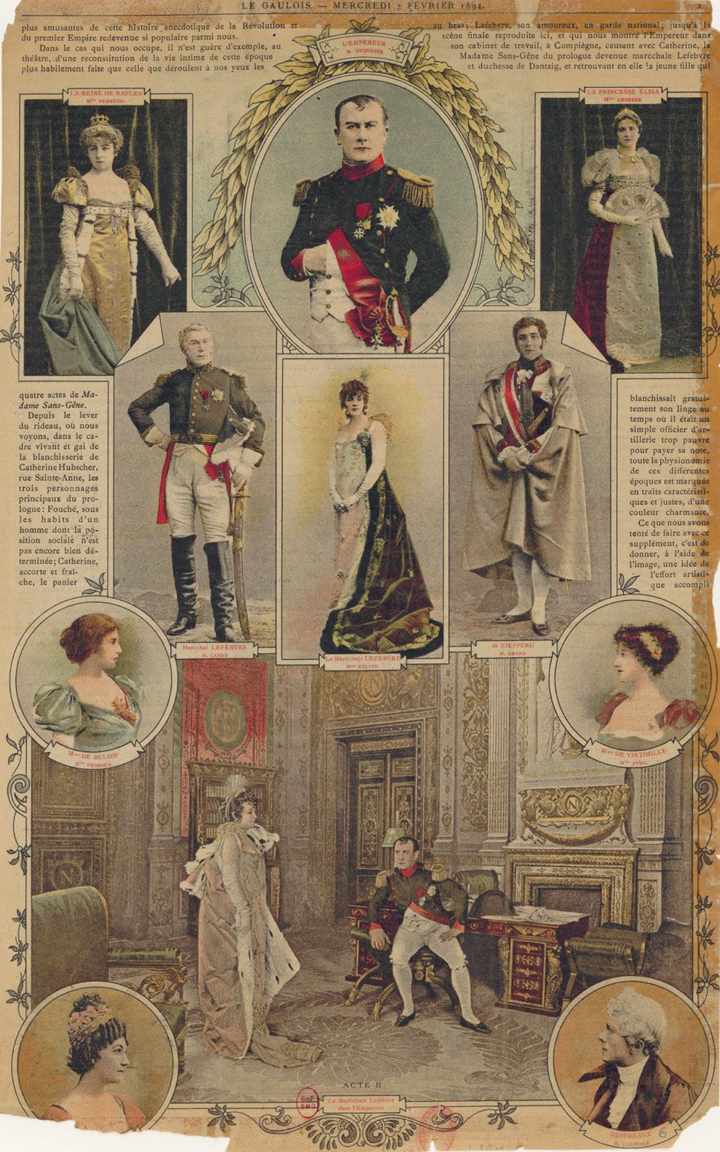
Images of premiere production, from Le Gaulois, February 1894

=== France ===
The original cast included Réjane as Catherine, a role she continued to play throughout her career. Other leading roles were taken by Madeleine Verneuil (Caroline of Naples), Edmond Duquesne (Napoleon), Léon Lérand (Fouché), Adolphe Candé (Lefevbre) and Georges Grand (Neipperg).

Later performers of the title role in French revivals included Marguerite Pierry, Mistinguett, Lise Delamare and Madeleine Renaud. Actors playing Napoleon have included Jean Desailly and Henri Rollan. Among the best-known actors to play Fouché was Jean-Louis Barrault (1957).

=== International ===
Réjane led a company to London in 1894, giving the play in the original French at the Gaiety Theatre from 24 June 1894. Duquesne (Napoleon), Candé (Lefebvre), Lérand (Fouché) and Verneuil (Caroline of Naples) repeated the roles they had created the previous year. The first British production of an English translation was given at the Lyceum Theatre in April 1897. The translation was by J Comyns Carr. Ellen Terry starred as Catherine with Henry Irving as Napoleon.

The first Broadway production was given on 14 January 1895 in an English translation at the Broadway Theatre on 41st Street. The cast, headed by Kathryn Kidder as Catherine, included James Keteltas Hackett as Neipperg. Réjane later performed in the US premiere of the original French version, and Terry and Irving brought their production to the Knickerbocker Theatre in October 1901.

The Australian premiere was given by Mr and Mrs Robert Brough's company at the Bijou Theatre, Melbourne, on 26 December 1898. Florence Brough played Catherine, and her husband played Napoleon.

== Adaptations ==
Ivan Caryll and Henry Hamilton (playwright) adapted the play into the 1903 comic opera The Duchess of Dantzic, with additional lyrics by Adrian Ross, which premiered at the Lyric Theatre, London.

The play was adapted as an opera of the same name, composed by Umberto Giordano with a libretto by Renato Simoni. It premiered at the Metropolitan Opera on 25 January 1915, conducted by Arturo Toscanini with Geraldine Farrar in the title role.

The first silent film adaptation was in 1900, starring Réjane; in 1911 she starred in a remake directed by Henri Desfontaines. The last silent film version was made in 1925, starring Gloria Swanson. Sound versions were made in 1941 by Roger Richebé, starring Arletty, and in 1945 in Argentina, featuring José Maurer. A version starring Sophia Loren was released in 1961.

The play was serialised in novel form by Raymond Lepelletier in Le Radical and published in 1894 by Librairie illustrée, Paris.
