= Catherine Hübscher =

French aristocrat (1753–1835)

Catherine Lefebvre re-directs here. For the curler, see Catherine Lefebvre (curler)

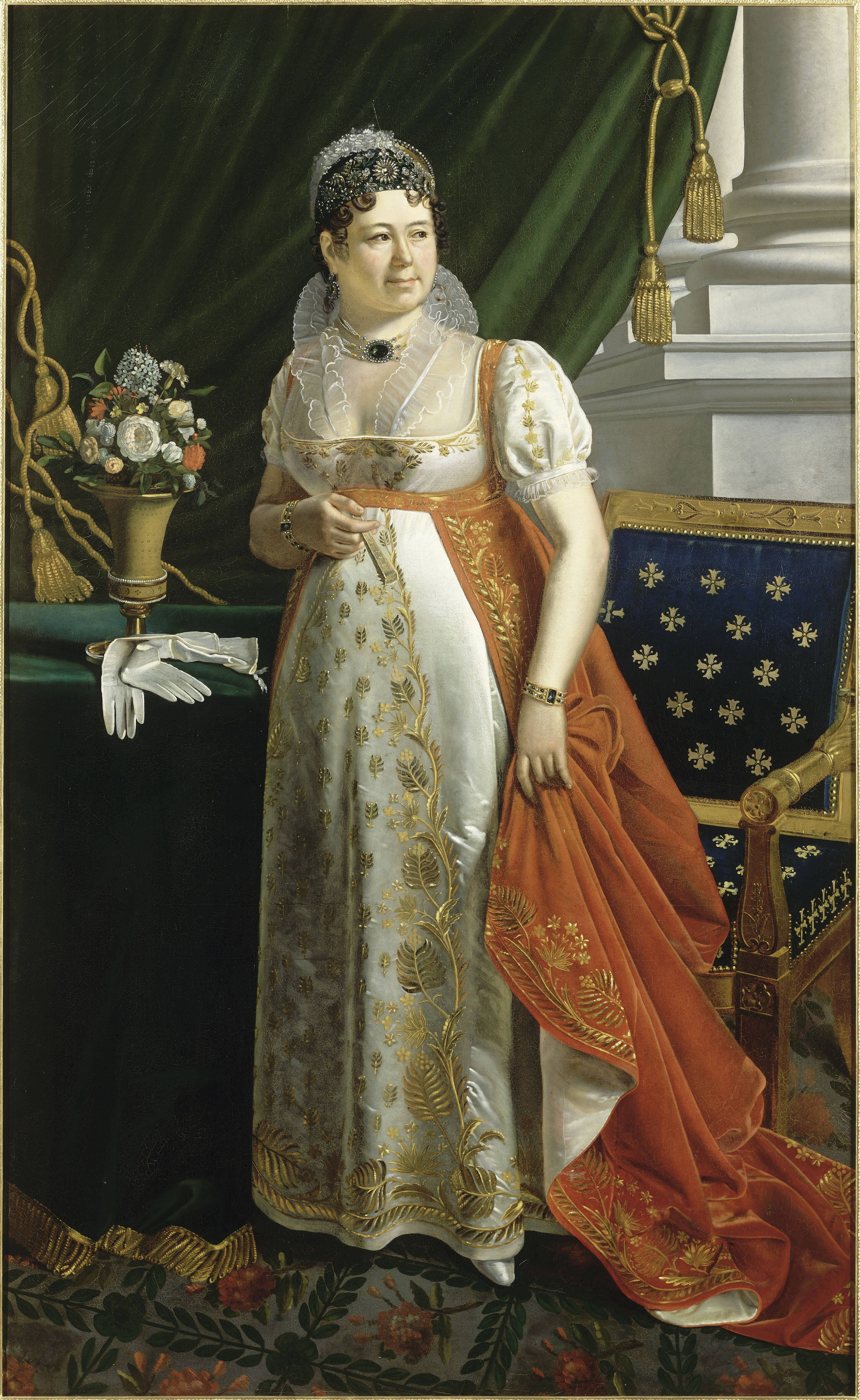
Catherine Hubscher, Maréchale Lefebvre Duchesse de Dantzig, known as "Madame Sans-Gêne (1753-1835), anonymous artist, c 1810.

Catherine Hübscher (Goldbach-Altenbach, 2 February 1753 – 1835), also known by the name Maréchale Lefebvre, was a French aristocrat, wife to François Joseph Lefebvre, Marshal of the Empire and Duke de Dantzig.

She lived with her husband and children at Château de Combault from 1802.

Hübscher's life and name were the subject of the 1893 play Madame Sans-Gêne, by Victorien Sardou and Émile Moreau. The play was also adapted as an opera, in 1915, and several times for film.
