= Émile Moreau (playwright) =

French playwright

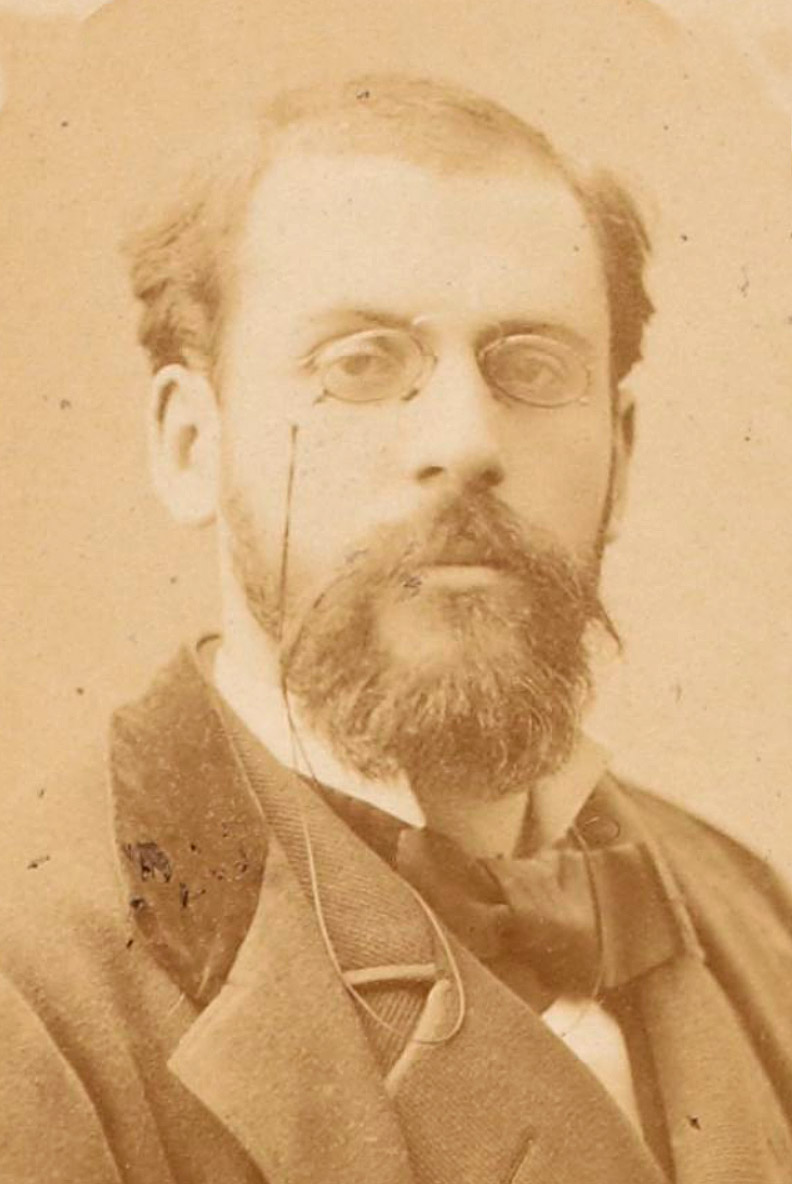
- Born: Marie-Jules-Émile Moreau; 8 December 1852; Brienon-sur-Armançon, Yonne, France
- Died: 27 December 1922 (aged 70); Brienon-sur-Armançon, Yonne, France
- Occupations: playwright, librettist

Marie-Jules-Émile Moreau (8 December 1852 – 27 December 1922), was a French playwright and librettist.

== Biography ==
Aged 17 he volunteered for the Franco-Prussian War in 1870 and participated to the Côte-d'Or and Armée de l'Est campaigns with general Bourbaki.

In 1887 he was awarded a poetry prize by the Académie française for Pallas Athénée.

The composer Paul Vidal won the first prix de Rome in 1883 with his cantata Le Gladiateur on a libretto by Moreau, and Auguste Chapuis the prix Rossini in 1886 with Les Jardins d'Armide.

He has sometimes been confused with Émile Moreau, the French businessman who was one of the co-founders of the Indian bookstore chain A. H. Wheeler & Co.

== Theatre ==
- 1877: Parthénice, à-propos in 1 act and in verse, Comédie-Française
- 1883: Corneille et Richelieu, à-propos in 1 act and in verse, Comédie-Française
- 1885: Matapan, comedy in 3 acts and in verse
- 1887: Protestation, à-propos in verse, Comédie-Française
- 1890: Le Drapeau, drama in 5 acts with Ernest Depré, Théâtre du Vaudeville
- 1890: Cléopâtre with Victorien Sardou, music by Xavier Leroux, Théâtre de la Porte-Saint-Martin
- 1891: L'Auberge des mariniers, drama in 5 acts, Théâtre de l'Ambigu-Comique
- 1893: Madame Sans-Gêne, comedy in 3 acts and a prologue with Victorien Sardou, Théâtre du Vaudeville
- 1895: Le Capitaine Floréal, drama in 5 acts with Ernest Depré, Théâtre de l'Ambigu-Comique
- 1897: La Montagne enchantée, pièce fantastique in 5 acts and 12 tableaux with Albert Carré, music by André Messager and Xavier Leroux, Théâtre de la Porte-Saint-Martin
- 1899: Madame de Lavalette, drama, Théâtre du Vaudeville
- 1901: Quo vadis ?, historical drama in 5 acts and 10 tableaux with Louis Péricaud after the eponymous novel by Henryk Sienkiewicz, music by Francis Thomé, Théâtre de la Porte-Saint-Martin
- 1909: Le Procès de Jeanne d'Arc, historical drama in 4 acts, Théâtre Sarah-Bernhardt
- 1909: Madame Margot with Charles Clairville, Théâtre Réjane
- 1912: La Reine Élisabeth, play in 4 acts, Théâtre Sarah-Bernhardt
- 1920: Le Courrier de Lyon, drama in 5 acts and 6 tableaux with Paul Siraudin and Alfred Delacour, Théâtre de la Porte-Saint-Martin

== Bibliography ==
- Manfred Le Gant de Conradin, Didot, 1886
- Le Secret de Saint Louis, Delagrave
