= Mesguich =

Mesguich is a surname. Notable people with the surname include:

- Daniel Mesguich (born 1952), French actor and director
- William Mesguich (born 1972), French actor and director, son of Daniel
