= Fidelity (2000 film) =

2000 film by Andrzej Żuławski

- Theatrical release poster
- French: La Fidélité
- Directed by: Andrzej Żuławski
- Screenplay by: Andrzej Żuławski
- Based on: La Princesse de Clèves by Madame de La Fayette
- Produced by: Paulo Branco
- Starring: Sophie Marceau; Pascal Greggory; Guillaume Canet; Magali Noël; Michel Subor; Édith Scob; Marc François; Marina Hands; Manuel Le Lièvre; Aurélien Recoing; Julie Brochen; Edéa Darcque; Jean-Charles Dumay; Armande Altaï; William Mesguich; Cécile Richard; Guy Tréjan
- Cinematography: Patrick Blossier
- Edited by: Marie-Sophie Dubus
- Music by: Andrzej Korzynski
- Production companies: Gemini Films; France 3 Cinéma
- Distributed by: Gemini Films
- Release date: 5 April 2000 (France)
- Running time: 166 minutes
- Country: France
- Language: French
- Budget: $6.3 million
- Box office: $1.5 million

Fidelity (French: La Fidélité) is a 2000 French drama film written and directed by Andrzej Żuławski and starring Sophie Marceau, Pascal Greggory and Guillaume Canet. Based on Madame de La Fayette's 1678 novel La Princesse de Clèves, the film follows a talented photographer who lands a lucrative job in Paris with a scandal-mongering tabloid and becomes romantically involved with an eccentric children's book publisher while resisting the sexual advances of another photographer. Filmed on location in Paris, Fidelity received the Cabourg Romantic Film Festival Award for Best Actress (Marceau) and the Golden Swann Award (Zulawski).

== Plot ==
Talented Canadian photographer Clélia lands a lucrative job in Paris with a tabloid called La Verite run by scandal-mongerer Rupert MacRoi. Clélia's mother once dated MacRoi years ago while working as a cabaret singer. Once she became pregnant with Clélia, she stopped seeing MacRoi and married Clélia's father. Accompanying her daughter to Paris, she tells Clélia that her strongest principle was honour, and encourages her to get married and settle down.

In Paris, Clélia gives a television interview and talks about her books of photography: a "study of absence" showing empty streets and deserted landscapes, and a study of fashion models without showing their faces. While taking photographs, Clélia meets Clève, a middle-aged children's book publisher who is preparing to marry MacRoi's wealthy daughter to bolster his flagging publishing house. Clève invites her back to his office, where they make love. Afterwards, she meets Clève's brother Bernard, a Catholic bishop, and their father, very briefly.

At the La Verite offices, Clélia finds most of her co-workers to be disillusioned—all knowing that they "earn their keep on dirt." At her first assignment covering a hockey team that MacRoi recently purchased, Clélia finds herself in the team's locker room surrounded by naked players celebrating their victory. She takes photos. MacRoi is there and drags her through automatic showers to embrace her tightly. She says she could be his daughter. He still desires her, regardless. As he leaves, Mac Roi asks her if she will join his family for a dinner party. Before she leaves, Clélia has sex with one of the players.

At MacRoi's dinner party, Clève declares his love for Clélia before his family and fiancé, Genièvre, the sister of MacRoi. Genièvre responds by calling off their wedding and hitting him. Later that evening, following MacRoi's announcement of the purchase of Clève's publishing company, Clève's father collapses and dies. Clève asks Clélia never to leave him.

Clélia and her mother move into Clève's house. A nun takes care of her mother, and it would appear Clelia wants to fulfill her mother's wish that her daughter settle with a 'decent man' before she dies, as when Cleve gives her his mother's engagement ring, she accepts. Later, she becomes sad reading lines from a W. H. Auden poem that mention a ghost and being lost.

Clélia's first photos for La Verite creates a sensation, and she is congratulated by her colleagues—all except Némo, a sexy young photographer with a poor background, who propositions her when they meet. In spite of her attraction to Némo, Clélia marries Clève in a ceremony marred by the presence of La Verite photographers, a helicopter, and reporters, including Némo. After the wedding, Némo leaves his girlfriend, Ina. He delivers his wedding photos to Clélia's home, walking in through an open back door and handing them to her mother in bed. Upset and suspecting her daughter is having an affair, Clélia's mother searches Clelia's photos for images of Nemo and then collapses. She sees her dead husband and asks for forgiveness. Clelia's honeymoon is interrupted, and she travels with her mother in an ambulance where her mother tells her to go back to Cleve. The ambulance stops, and she gets out, distraught.

Némo continues to follow Clélia. She sees him taking photos through her house windows and panics, running upstairs and demanding her husband give her a baby. Nemo is now inside and takes photos of both of them having sex. Later Clelia learns that Némo was given this spying assignment by MacRoi who wants to find dirt on Clève. Clelia continues to see Némo but does not have sex with him. At home she takes photos of flower arrangements.

She and Ina travel by train to Normandy to attend a motorcycle event. During the race Némo crashes, and Clélia rushes to his side. He laughs as he recovers quickly. At the celebration afterwards, Némo gets drunk and talks about his investigation into the illegal organ trade, trying to impress his father, who says he'll get himself killed. Nemo and Clélia take the train back to Paris together and at the station she sees the ghosts of her mother and father looking happy.

After Némo is attacked by a gang hired by the illegal organ traffickers, Clélia asks him to show her the underworld he is investigating. Clélia resists Nemo's advances. When she returns home, Clève is convinced she is having an affair, despite her promises that she will never be unfaithful to him.

After learning that his brother, the bishop, has run off with a married woman, Clève says he will join his brother in Plougastel-Daoulas in Brittany at The Happy Inn. After he leaves, Clélia calls the offices of La Verite to inform them of Bishop Bernard's "love-nest" in Brittany, presumably to make it difficult for Clève to stay there. Clélia watches the television coverage of the bishop's humiliation but he says a person cannot experience the divine if they do not seize happiness.

Clève does not return to his wife, and after sleeping with a transvestite prostitute, he calls La Verite asking that they track his wife.

Clélia goes to Némo's house and removes his shirt, but they are interrupted by gunfire. Némo and Clélia are able to escape, and Clelia tells him she thinks he is the youth she did not have.

The photographer from La Verite has photos of the attack, and the editors consider publishing them. Cleve is present. The paper decides not to publish, as the images may look false and could be interpreted as a setup.

Soon after, Clélia attends a publicity session with MacRoi outside the paper's offices. MacRoi presents Némo with a motorcycle for his work exposing the gangsters. During the session, snipers attempt to kill Némo, causing the bike to be set on fire. Clève is injured, and Clelia runs to him but is pushed away. MacRoi is killed by a shard of glass in his eye.

After the funeral, MacRoi's daughter reorganizes the company. She fires her mother and Clélia, who begs her husband to come back to her, but he will not. On their way out of the building, he appears to have a heart attack and falls down a flight of steps. He dies on the way to the hospital, having given his wedding ring to Clélia. Again, the ambulance stops, and she gets out in the street, distraught.

At the funeral she avoids Némo and leaves Paris. Sometime later, Némo is interviewed on television and talks about his new portfolio dedicated to Clélia, who has disappeared.

A few years later, while taking photographs in a monastery, Clélia, now with short hair, sees an English-language MacRoi Production film on TV called The Princess of Cleve about her life, directed by Némo. She laughs when she discovers his first name on the credits. She goes into the garden and places her wedding rings on a tree branch while the ghost of her late husband looks on. He smiles. Clélia says, "Forgive me." Cleve retrieves the rings while she weeps.

== Cast ==
- Sophie Marceau as Clélia
- Pascal Greggory as Clève
- Guillaume Canet as Némo
- Michel Subor as Rupert MacRoi
- Magali Noël as Clélia's mother
- Marc François as Saint-André
- Édith Scob as Diane
- Marina Hands as Julia
- Manuel Le Lièvre as Jean
- Aurélien Recoing as Bernard
- Jean-Charles Dumay as Antoine
- Guy Tréjan as Julien Clève
- Edéa Darcque as Ina
- Julie Brochen as Genièvre
- Armande Altaï as Mrs. MacRoi
- William Mesguich as David
- Cécile Richard as Séléna
- Sylvain Maury as a transvestite

== Accolades ==
- 2000 Cabourg Romantic Film Festival Award for Best Actress (Sophie Marceau) Won
- 2000 Cabourg Romantic Film Festival Golden Swann Award (Andrzej Zulawski) Won
- 2000 International Steadicam Award for Best Steadicam Shot (Adam Rózanski) Won
