= L'Entretien de M. Descartes avec M. Pascal le jeune =

L'Entretien entre M. Descartes avec M. Pascal le jeune is a theatre play by Jean-Claude Brisville.

Created on 22 October 1985 at Théâtre de l'Europe in a mise-en-scène by Jean-Pierre Miquel, with Henri Virlogeux (René Descartes) and Daniel Mesguich (Blaise Pascal), the play was revived in 2007 at Théâtre de l'Œuvre in a mise-en-scène by Daniel Mesguich, with Daniel Mesguich (Descartes) and William Mesguich (Pascal).

It is a dialogue imagined by Brisville between the two philosophers from a real conversation they would have had in 1647 but of which nothing has ever been known.
