= Porte Maillot =

City gate of Paris

Coordinates: 48°52′40″N 02°16′56″E

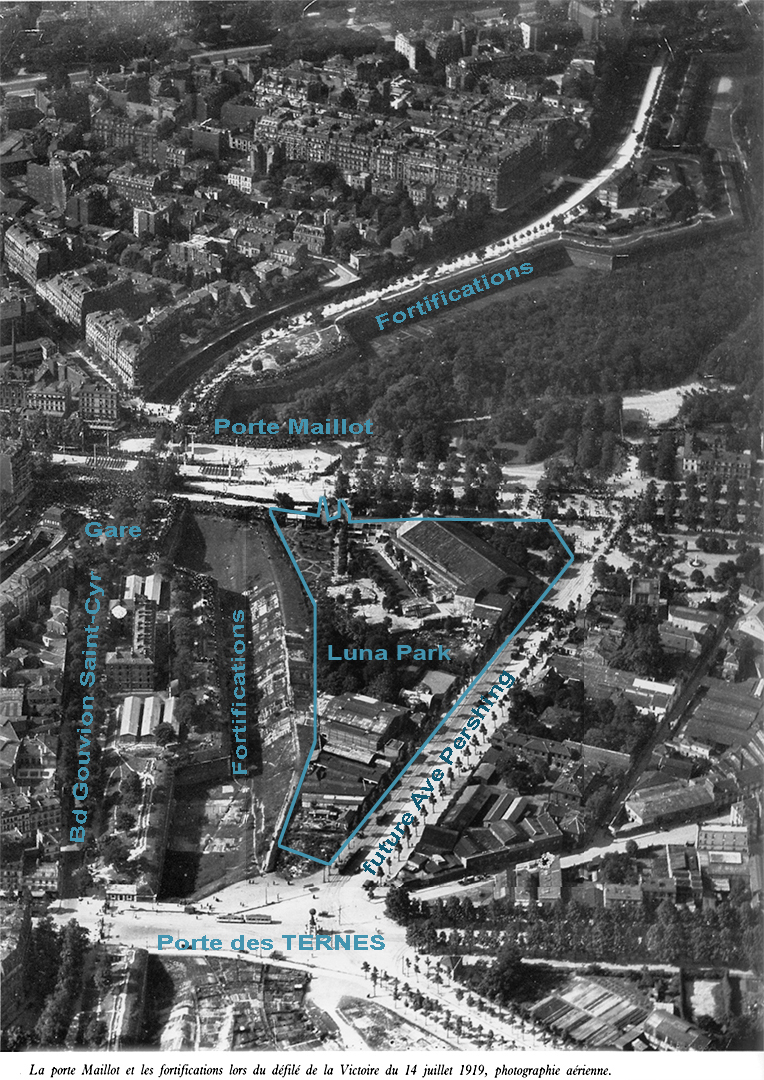
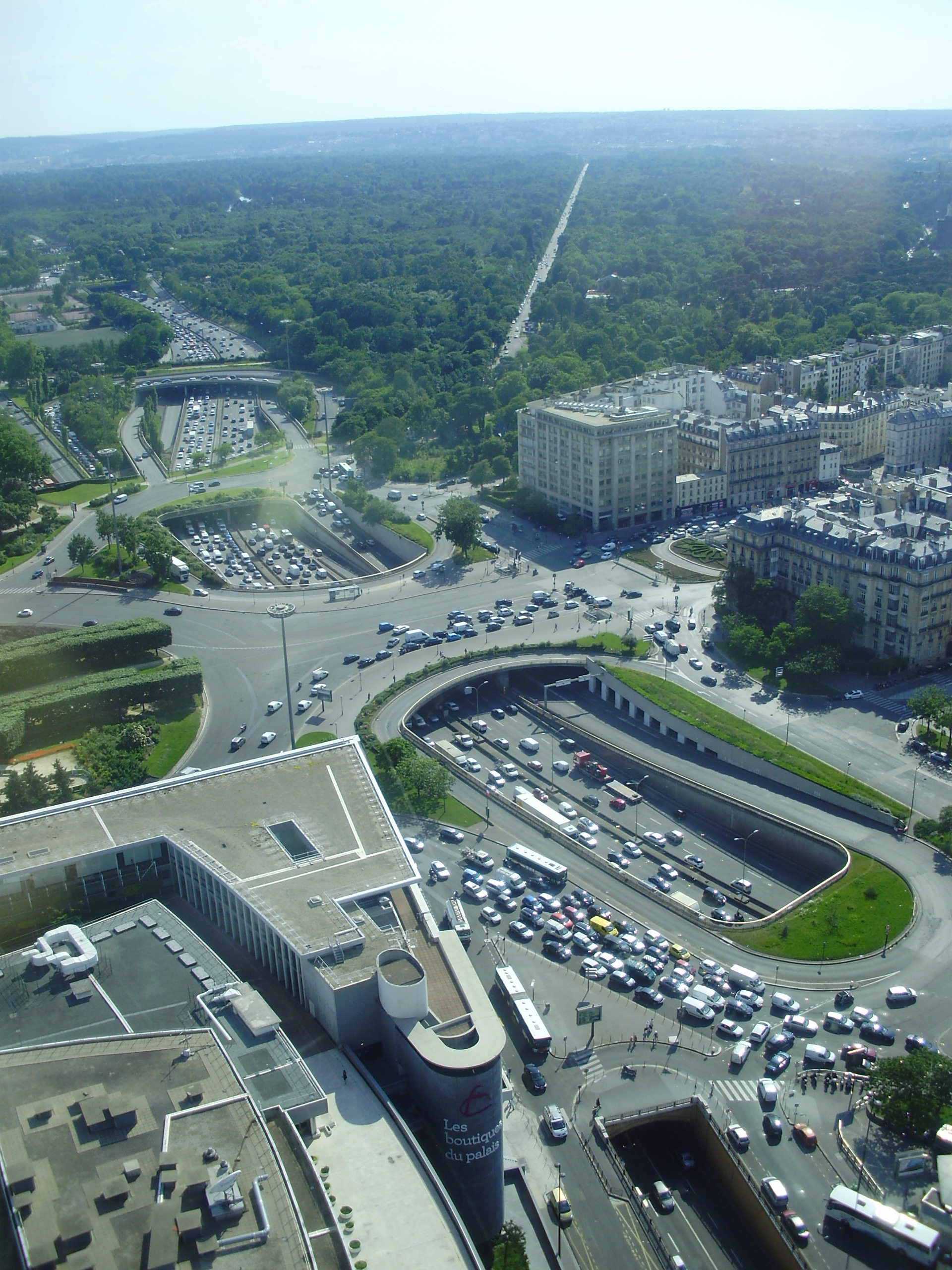
Porte Maillot in 1919 and 2012

The Porte Maillot (also known as the porte Mahiaulx, Mahiau or Mahiot after a Paille-maille court, or the Porte de Neuilly) is one of the access points into Paris mentioned in 1860 and one of the ancient city gates in the Thiers wall.

== City gate ==
It was on the boundary between the 16th and the 17th arrondissements, at the junction of the Avenue de la Grande Armée, the Boulevard de l'Amiral-Bruix and the Boulevard Gouvion-Saint-Cyr. It gives its name to the Neuilly–Porte Maillot railway station and Porte Maillot metro station.

As at January 2023, the area was being redeveloped, expanding the underground RER station and greening the surface.
