= Théâtre Malakoff =

Coordinates: 48.8733°N 2.2844°E

The Théâtre Malakoff was a theatre venue now disestablished, formerly located at 56 bis Avenue de Malakoff (today Avenue Raymond-Poincaré) in the 16th arrondissement of Paris.

On 22 December 1912, Aurélien Lugné-Poe premiered there the play The Annunciation of Marie by Paul Claudel with the company of the Théâtre de l'Œuvre.
