= Lina Munte =

French actress

Munte, c.1885, by Nadar

Lina Munte (c. 1850 (Note: The cited biographical sketch by Horst Schroeder gives 1850 as Munte's year of birth; her gravestone in the Cimetière des Batignolles gives her dates as 1854–1909, but gives her daughter Suzanne's year of birth as 1867, in which year Lina, if born in 1854, would have been 13. The obituary in Le Journal gives her age at death as 60.) – 30 June 1909) was a French actress. She had a successful career in Paris and St Petersburg, but was forced to retire in her fifties because of illness. Among the roles she created was the title role in Oscar Wilde's Salomé (1896) and characters in new plays by Catulle Mendès, Émile Zola, Émile Erckmann, Alexandre Chatrian and Georges Ohnet.

== Life and career ==
Munte was born in Paris. She began her career as a dancer, but from her early years she wanted to be an actress. She made the switch and was engaged in suburban Parisian theatres at Batignolles in 1871, and Saint-Denis. She subsequently played in Toulouse and Brussels, before returning to Paris. In March 1877 she appeared at the Théâtre de l'Ambigu-Comique in Justice, a new drama by Catulle Mendès. Le Figaro commented:

The role of Geneviève was entrusted to a beginner … Mademoiselle Lina Munte. She is a tall and elongated person, whose fragile and melancholy aspect suits the character. She played it with great accuracy, simplicity and conviction. It is a notable début.

In the title role of Oscar Wilde's Salomé, 1896

The following month she appeared in Un Retour de jeunesse, a verse drama by Jules Barbier. Le Figaro thought her the only member of the Ambigu cast who spoke the verse well: "Miss Lina Munte has only an imperceptible trickle of voice, but she uses it with such skill that she makes everything happen in the listener's ear. Her diction, similar to the whisper of a stream, lacks neither intelligence nor charm."

She appeared at the Ambigu, the Porte Saint-Martin and the Châtelet in productions including Émile Zola's L'Assommoir, Erckmann and Chatrian's Madame Thérèse, Georges Ohnet's, Le Maître de forges and Serge Panine, and Adolphe d'Ennery's Une Cause célèbre and Diana.

In the 1880s Munte joined Jane Hading for what Comœdia described as "a great and successful world tour", after which she followed a familiar course for French stars by joining the company of the Theatre-Français Impérial at the Théâtre-Michel in St Petersburg, as Marguerite Georges and Gustave Worms had done earlier and Hading and Gabrielle Robinne did later. She remained there until 1893, when she returned to Paris, appearing at the Ambigu in a melodramatic play, Mêre et martyre.

In 1896, with Lugné-Poe's experimental theatre company, Munte created the role of Salomé in Oscar Wilde's one act tragedy. One critic wrote of her performance that her voice and beauty filled him with the most intense feelings he had ever known. Le Matin found her "absolutely remarkable with her ferocious sensuality". Later in the same year Munte appeared in another Wilde play, Lady Windermere's Fan, adapted into French as La Passante (The passer-by), in the role of Mrs Erlynne, rechristened Madame Vernon. It was given in a double bill in which she reprised her Salomé.

At the Ambigu, Munte starred in critical and box office successes, often playing the "femme fatale" roles with which she was popularly associated. Her daughter Suzanne (1867–1938) followed her into the theatrical profession and appeared in many stage productions and cinema films.

Illness forced Munte's retirement from the stage. She died in a nursing home in Paris on 30 June 1909; she was 60, according to Le Journal.

== Notes, references and sources ==
=== Sources ===
- Eells, Emily (2010). "Naturalizing Oscar Wilde as an homme de lettres: the French reception of Dorian Gray and Salomé (1895–1922)". In Stefano Evangelista (ed.). The Reception of Oscar Wilde in Europe. London and New York: Continuum. ISBN 978-1-84-706005-1.
- Robinne, Gabrielle (1961). Mais si! La vie est drôle. Paris: Éditions du Scorpion. OCLC 35633403.
- Stites, Richard (2006). Serfdom, Society, and the Arts in Imperial Russia. New Haven: Yale University Press. ISBN 978-0-30-010889-7.
