= Millicent Murby =

British socialist activist (1873-1951)

Millicent Beatrice Murby (1873 – 14 January 1951) was a British socialist activist.

Murby worked as a postal clerk. She joined the Fabian Society in 1901, becoming secretary of the Clapham and District Fabian Society in 1907, and serving on the national executive from 1907 to 1912. She also lectured on subjects relating to history and the social sciences. Murby was a founder member of the Fabian Women's Group, and served as its treasurer in its early years. In 1908, Murby wrote a pamphlet for the Fabians, "The Common Sense of the Woman Question".

By the 1920s, Murby had become a health inspector. In 1925, she married Louis Jast, a leading librarian. Murby's niece, Winifred Knights, became an artist. She was heavily influenced by Murby, and painted her on several occasions.

In her spare time, Murby was involved in amateur dramatics, and was the first person in Britain to play the title role in Oscar Wilde's Salome, while professional productions of the play were banned.
