= Gustave Worms =

French actor and teacher (1836–1910)

Worms by Atelier Nadar

Gustave-Hippolyte Worms (26 November 1836 – 19 November 1910) was a French actor and teacher of acting. After a successful student career at the Paris Conservatoire, he joined the Comédie-Française in 1858. Although elected to the company's élite group of sociétaires in 1864, he found his elevation blocked by the French government, and took up a ten-year engagement at the Théâtre-Michel in St. Petersburg, where his star status was recognised.

Returning to Paris in 1874, he rejoined the Comédie-Française and remained a company member until his retirement from the stage in 1901. From 1880 to 1900 he was also a professor at the Conservatoire, where he trained many of the theatrical stars of the next generation. He died in his Paris flat at the age of 73.

== Life and career ==
=== Early years ===
Worms was born in Paris on 26 November 1836, the first son of Mayer Worms and his wife Iphégenie, née Salomon. His family had theatrical connections – his father was controller-in-chief of the Opéra-Comique– but he trained as a compositor in a printing works. Feeling drawn to a theatrical career he gained admission to the Paris Conservatoire, where he studied under Pierre-François Beauvallet. In 1857 he won prizes in comedy and tragedy, and a concert was given to raise the necessary funds to buy his exemption from military service.

In 1858 Worms made his début at the Comédie-Française in the role of Valère in Tartuffe. After six years of constant progress and dedicated service, he was unanimously elected to the élite group of sociétaires of the company in 1864, but the requisite ministerial ratification of his appointment was not immediately forthcoming. Frustrated, Worms accepted an offer from Russia and served a decade with the Theatre-Français Impérial company at the Théâtre-Michel in St Petersburg. (Note: This was a career move followed by many French stars before and after Worms, including Marguerite Georges, Lina Munte, Jane Hading and Gabrielle Robinne.) During these ten years he honed his skills further, and enjoyed star treatment and celebrity status.

=== Return to Paris and later years ===
Worms returned to Paris in 1874, and joined the company of the Théâtre du Gymnase, opening in La Dame aux camélias. He made such an impression that, in the words of Le Figaro, there was unanimous regret that an artist of his stature was not at the Comédie-Française. The management of the latter sought his return, and raised a large sum to buy him out of his contract at the Gymnase. In 1877 he rejoined his old company in George Sand's Le Marquis de Villemer, and became a sociétaire the following year. He remained with the company until his retirement from the stage in 1901.

In 1880, in addition to his work with the Comédie-Française, Worms became a professor at the Conservatoire, holding the post for the next twenty years. His female students over that period included Berthe Cerny, Wanda de Boncza, Suzanne Desprès, Blanche Dufresne, Marguerite Moreno and Jane Thomsen; among his male students were Albert Darmont, Édouard de Max, Charles Esquier, Robert Falconnier, Jules-Louis-Auguste Leitner and Lugné-Poe. Five years after Worms retired from his professorship in 1900, Gabriel Fauré, the director of the Conservatoire, appointed him to its governing board, the conseil supérieur de l'Ecole.

Worms died at his Paris flat on 19 November 1910, aged 73. He was survived by a widow – the actress and sociétiare Blanche Baretta – and a daughter and a son, the actor Jules Worms.

== Notes, references and sources ==
=== Sources ===
- Abraham, Emile (1899). Acteurs & actrices de Paris. Paris: La librairie nouvelle. OCLC 1117564437.
- Robichez, Jacques (1957). Le symbolisme au theatre. Paris: L'Arche. OCLC 697606264.
- Robinne, Gabrielle (1961). Mais si! La vie est drôle. Paris: Éditions du Scorpion. OCLC 35633403.
- Stites, Richard (2006). Serfdom, Society, and the Arts in Imperial Russia. New Haven: Yale University Press. ISBN 978-0-30-010889-7.
