= The Supper =

1992 film

Le souper
- Directed by: Édouard Molinaro
- Written by: Jean-Claude Brisville; Édouard Molinaro
- Produced by: Yves Rousset-Rouard
- Starring: Claude Brasseur; Claude Rich
- Cinematography: Michael Epp
- Edited by: Annick Rousset-Rouard
- Music by: Vladimir Cosma; Luigi Cherubini
- Distributed by: Ariane Distribution
- Release date: 23 December 1992
- Running time: 90 minutes
- Country: France
- Language: French

The Supper (French: Le Souper) is a 1992 French period drama film directed by Édouard Molinaro. Based on a stage play by Jean-Claude Brisville, the film imagines the negotiations over supper about a new government for France after the Battle of Waterloo in 1815 and who will get the top jobs.

== Plot ==
After the abdication and exile of Napoléon Bonaparte following the Battle of Waterloo, Paris is occupied by English and Prussian troops and the people are restless. On 6 July 1815 Joseph Fouché, head of the provisional government, is invited to a late night supper at the town house of Charles Maurice de Talleyrand-Périgord, former minister of foreign affairs.

Talleyrand puts it to Fouché that France urgently needs to replace Bonaparte's collapsed empire with a constitution that is acceptable to the occupying powers and to the people. He rules out various options: continuing Bonaparte's line through his infant son, a return to the republic that Bonaparte overthrew, or a monarchy under the more progressive Orléans branch of the former royal family. In his view, the only viable route for France is to return to the original Bourbon monarchy that preceded the republic.

This would cause grave difficulty for Fouché who, while Talleyrand was in exile in England, had voted for the execution of the king in 1793 and was heavily involved subsequently in the bloody repression of royalists. Resenting the accusation that he has royal blood on his hands but Talleyrand is clean, he points out that in 1804 Talleyrand was instrumental in the illegal abduction and summary execution of Louis Antoine, Duke of Enghien, a prince of royal blood.

Talleyrand is confident that, if Fouché agrees to join a government under the executed king's brother, he would be granted an amnesty and could regain his previous post as minister of police. Fouché, who has few other options open, eventually agrees. Over champagne followed by cognac, the two reminisce about their difficult childhoods, one an aristocrat of ancient line cursed with a club foot and the other the son of a slave ship captain, how both were initially ordained into the Catholic church, and how they have each found happiness with a younger woman (in Talleyrand's case his niece, the Duchess of Dino).

The film ends with an extract from Chateaubriand's memoirs about the next evening: “Suddenly a door opened: silently there appeared Vice leaning on the arm of Crime, Mr. de Talleyrand helped along by Mr. Fouché.”

== Cast ==
- Claude Brasseur - Fouché
- Claude Rich - Talleyrand
- Michel Piccoli – the voice of Chateaubriand
- Alexandra Vandernoot - Duchess of Dino
- Stéphane Jobert - Carême
- Ticky Holgado – Jacques, a servant
- Yann Collette – Jean, a servant
