= Avenue de Malakoff =

Street in Paris, France

Coordinates: 48.8754°N 2.2839°E

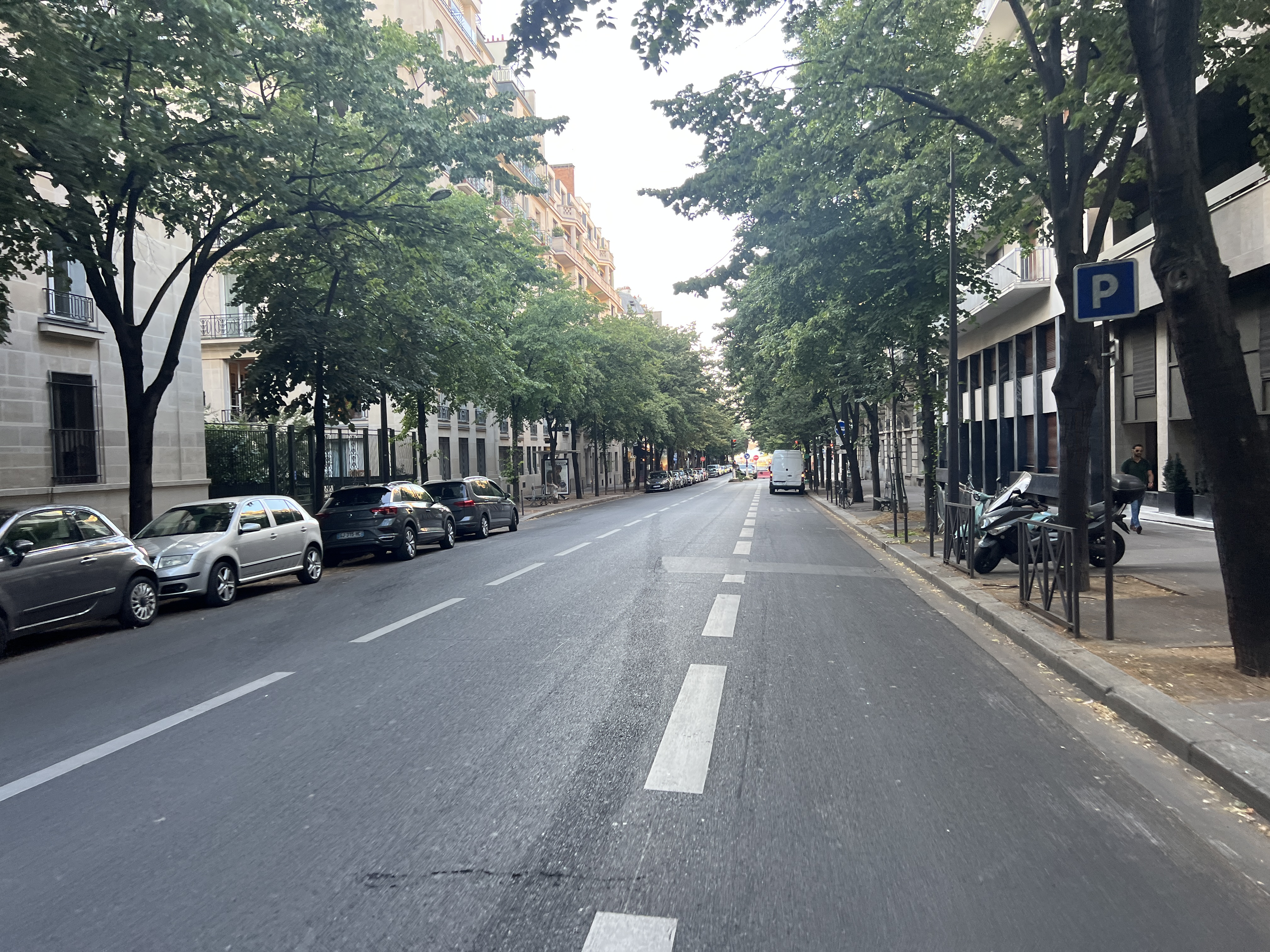
The Avenue de Malakoff in 2023.

The Avenue de Malakoff is a street in the 16th arrondissement of Paris. It was given its present name in 1854, the year in which French troops captured the Malakhov Tower during the Crimean War, leading to the subsequent capture of nearby Sevastopol the following year.

At 410 metres (1,350 ft) long and 23.5 metres (77 ft) wide, it begins at the avenue Foch and ends at a junction with boulevard de l'Amiral-Bruix and the avenue de la Grande-Armée. It formerly began at place du Trocadéro, but in 1936 the section between place du Trocadéro and avenue Foch was renamed avenue Raymond-Poincaré.

In the street was the Théâtre Malakoff, little theatrical venue at the beginning of the 20th century.
