= Wanda de Boncza =

French actress (1872–1902)

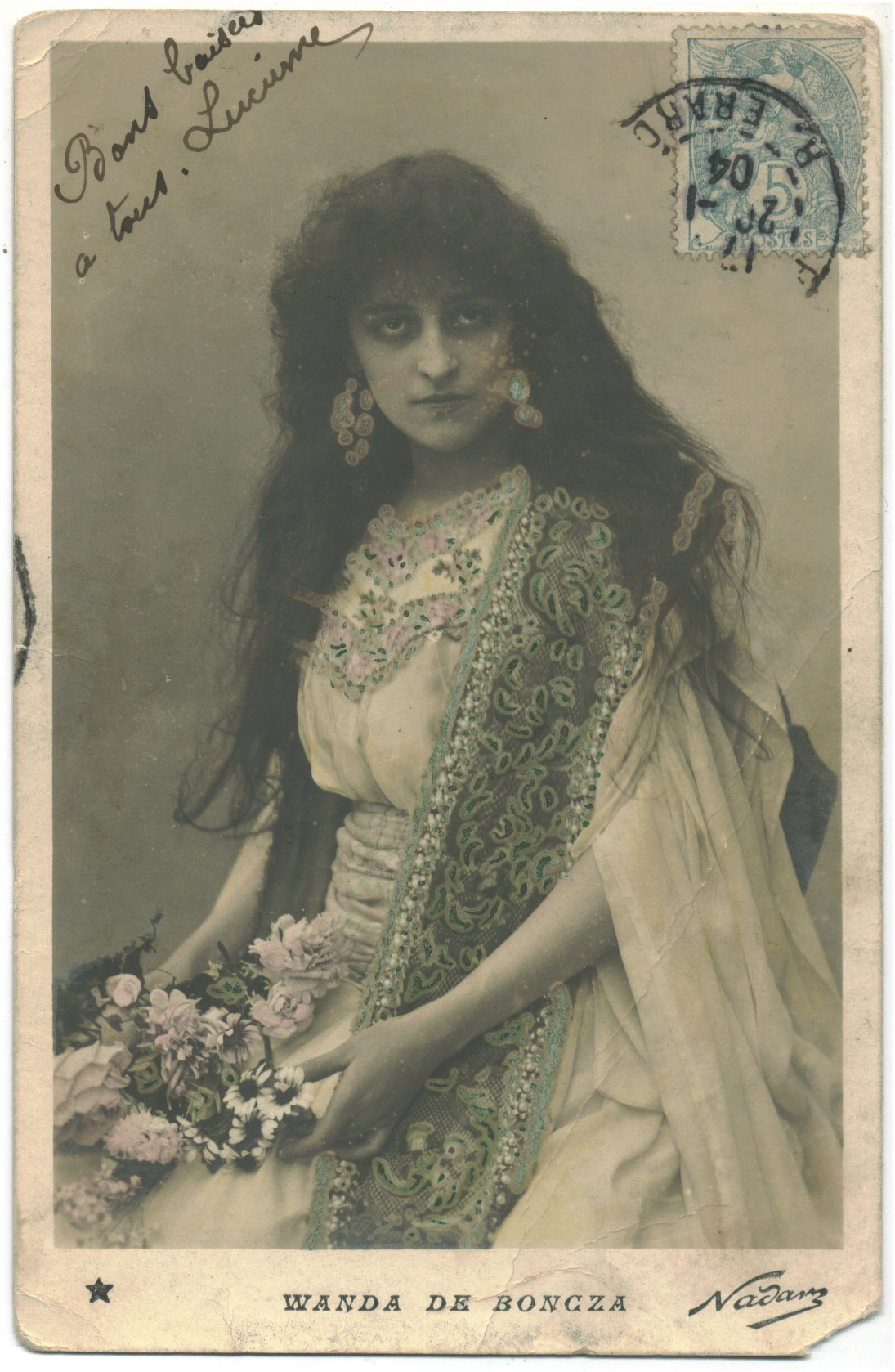
- A postcard featuring a portrait of de Boncza by the photographer Nadar
- Born: Wanda-Marie-Émilie Rutkowska; March 8, 1872; Batignolles-Monceau, Paris, French Third Republic
- Died: August 15, 1902 (aged 30); 8th arrondissement, Paris, French Third Republic
- Resting place: Batignolles Cemetery
- Education: Conservatoire de Paris
- Occupation: Thespian
- Era: Belle Époque
- Parents: Gustave Rutkowski (father); Anne Émilie Bojanowska (mother)

Wanda de Boncza (8 March 1872 – 15 August 1902) was a French actress, born Wanda-Marie-Émilie Rutkowska.

== Early life ==
De Boncza was born in Paris, the daughter of Polish-Jewish immigrants. She studied comedy at the Conservatoire de Paris with Gustave Worms.

== Career ==
De Boncza was considered a stage beauty in Paris, acting first at the Odéon, and then at the Comédie-Française. One English-language critic in 1901 described her stage presence as "little and dark, Parisian and perverse, she whose eyes are enigmas ... beautiful in her own odd way." Her stage appearances included roles in Fiancée (1894), La Barynia (1894), On ne badine pas avec l'amour (1896), Struensée (1898), La Conscience de l'enfant (1899), Alkestis (1900), and Le Marquis de Priola (1902).

== Personal life ==
De Boncza died in Paris in 1902, aged 30 years, from appendicitis and an attempted surgical intervention. Some reports also mentioned that morphine addiction may have contributed to her early death. A few months after her death, there was an auction of her jewelry (especially pearls), gowns, and other possessions, yielding over a million francs, more than enough to pay off her gambling and other debts.
