= Théâtre de l'Œuvre =

Theatre in Paris, France

- Salle Berlioz, 3, Cité Monthiers
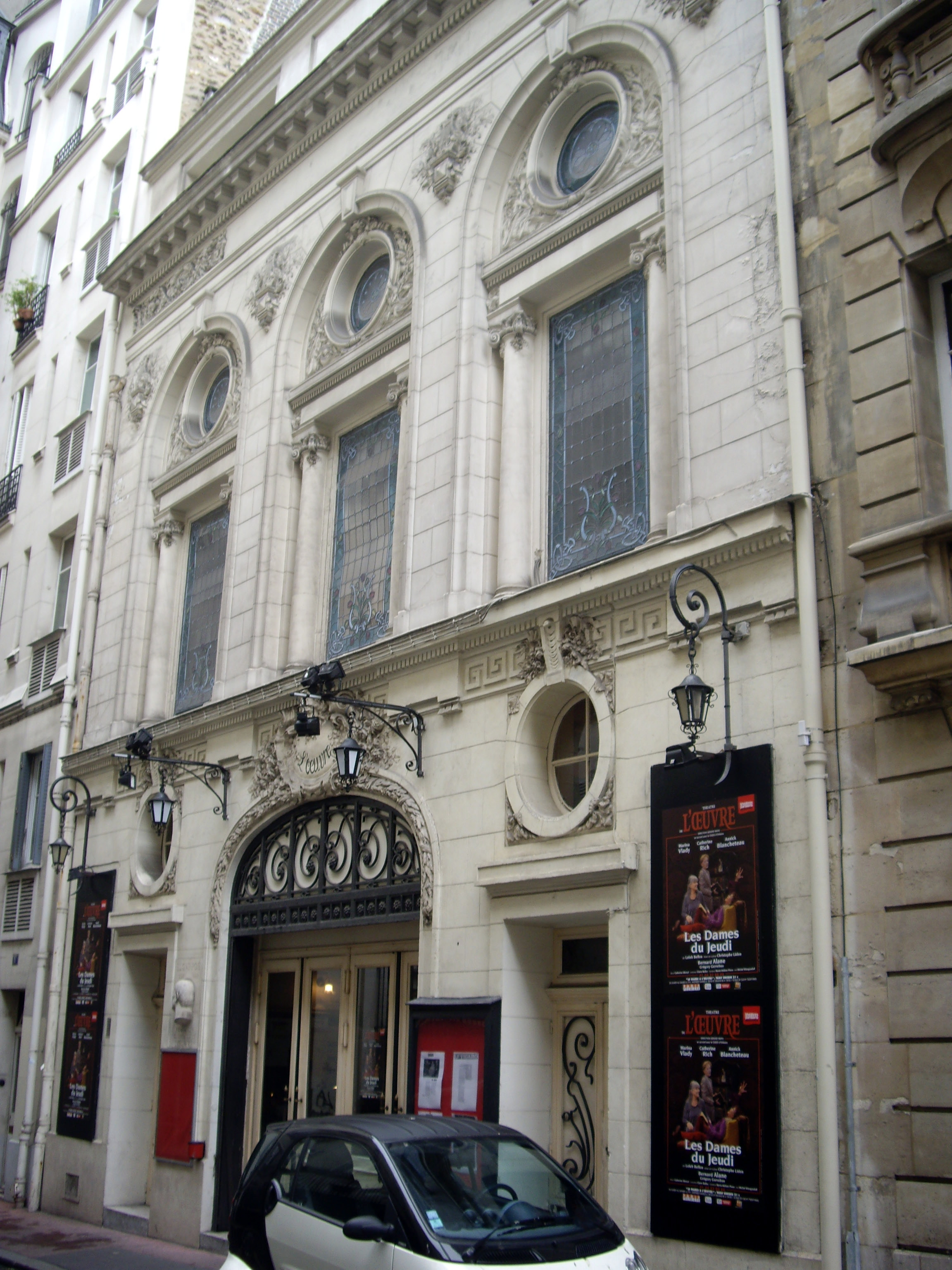
- Théâtre de l'Œuvre c. 2010
- Interactive map of Théâtre de l'Œuvre
- Address: 55 rue de Clichy, 9° arrondissement Paris; France
- Coordinates: 48.880961°N 2.3285°E
- Operator: Gérard Maro
- Capacity: 326
- Type: theatre

Construction
- Opened: 1893

The Théâtre de l'Œuvre (French pronunciation: [teɑtʁ də lœvʁ]) is a Paris theatre on the Right Bank, located at 3, Cité Monthiers, entrance 55, rue de Clichy, in the 9° arrondissement. It is commonly conflated and confused with the late-nineteenth-century theater company named Théâtre de l'Œuvre (or simply, L'Œuvre), founded by actor-director-producer Aurélien Lugné-Poe, who would not take control of this performance space until 1919. His company is best known for its earlier phase of existence, before it acquired this theatre venue. From 1893 to 1899, in various Parisian theatres, Lugné-Poe premiered modernist plays by foreign dramatists (Ibsen, Strindberg, Hauptmann, Bjørnson, Wilde), as well as new work by French Symbolists, most notoriously Alfred Jarry’s nihilistic farce Ubu Roi, which opened in 1896 at Nouveau-Théâtre (today, Théâtre de Paris, 15, rue Blanche).

It is best to discuss the surviving theater building and Lugné-Poe's several-phase theater production company separately, though they share much of their history.

== Building: Salle Berlioz ==
According to the present theatre's Web site, at some point in the nineteenth century, the Duke of Gramont built a rudimentary little theatre on this property, where he had also installed his mistress, opera singer Mademoiselle Coupé. Reputedly, the theatre privately offered a repertory that included risqué, even salacious work. In 1892, the space was renovated as a public concert hall with entrance in the adjoining courtyard area of Cité Monthiers. The hall, which featured orchestra level and three-sided balcony seating, as well as a large upstage organ, was named Salle Berlioz in honor of French composer, conductor, and music critic Hector Berlioz (1803-1869), who had lived nearby on the rue de Calais.

== Lugné-Poe's art theater company ==
Launched in Paris in 1893, the Théâtre de l'Œuvre was among the first theatrical companies in France to provide a home for the artists of the Symbolist Movement of the 1890s. Director Lugné-Poe modeled the enterprise on the experimental structure of André Antoine's independent, subscription-based theatre company Théâtre Libre, though it would intentionally adopt a non-Naturalistic program of plays. Lugné-Poe had embraced symbolism's "subjectivity, spirituality, and mysterious internal and external forces" as a source of profound truth after working as an actor at the Théâtre d'Art, the first independent Symbolist theatre. The poet Paul Fort, then just seventeen years old, had formed the company to explore the performance potential of found texts such as The Iliad, The Bible, new plays by French writers, and his own lyric verse. When Fort left the group in 1892, and his efforts to produce Maurice Maeterlinck's Pelléas et Mélisande and Auguste Villiers de l'Isle-Adam's Axël fell through, Lugné-Poe stepped in to transform the art-theater endeavor into his own company, the Théâtre de l'Œuvre.

Unlike Fort's project, which catered to the intellectual elite, Lugné-Poe sought to create a "theatre for the people," and customarily offered free tickets to most of the public, reserving only 100 seats for his subscription holders. Under his direction, the company first performed Maurice Maeterlinck's Pelléas et Mélisande on May 17, 1893 at the Théâtre des Bouffes Parisiens. According to theatre historian Oscar Brockett:

The opening production, Maeterlink's Pelléas and Mélisande, was typical. Few properties and little furniture were used; the stage was lighted from overhead and most of the action passed in semidarkness; a gauze curtain, hung between the actors and the audience, gave the impression that mist enveloped the stage; backdrops, painted in gray tones, emphasized the air of mystery; costumes were vaguely medieval, although the intention was to create draperies of no particular period. The actors spoke in a staccato chant like priests and, according to some critics, behaved like sleepwalkers; their gestures were strongly stylized. Given this radically new approach, it is not surprising that many spectators were mystified.

With the help of poet and critic Camille Mauclair and the painter Édouard Vuillard (with whom Lugné-Poe was sharing an apartment), the director dedicated the theatre to presenting the work of the young French Symbolist playwrights in addition to introducing new foreign dramas. The group established themselves that same year, renting a small rehearsal room atop Salle Berlioz and calling themselves Maison de l'Œuvre, or literally, the "House of Works." Lugné-Poe, however, soon established company offices at 23, rue Turgot, eventually moving operations across the street to no. 22. None of the productions in the seminal phase of his art theatre (1893-1899) appeared at the Salle Berlioz.

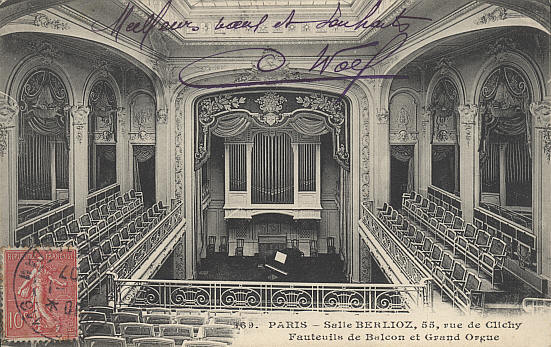
La salle Berlioz in 1907

In addition to those of Maeterlinck, the theatre company produced Sanskrit dramas, as well as works by foreign authors such as Oscar Wilde, Gerhart Hauptmann, August Strindberg, and Gabriele D’Annunzio, alongside works by young French dramatists like Henry Bataille, Henri de Régnier et Alfred Jarry. Lugné-Poe was also instrumental in introducing Henrik Ibsen’s plays to French audiences.

Just as in the description of the theatre's initial performance, the majority of Lugné-Poe's stage settings were simple, non-realistic representations of line and color on canvas backdrops. He sought to create a theatre of poetry and dreams while staying true to his motto, "The word creates the decor." The staging was atmospheric and the acting stylized; costumes were usually simple and “timeless.” Some of the company's designers included Henri de Toulouse-Lautrec, Maurice Denis, Odilon Redon, Pierre Bonnard, and Vuillard himself.

Jarry's lithograph advertising the 1896 premiere of Ubu Roi.

On December 10, 1896, the Théâtre de l'Œuvre presented Alfred Jarry's soon legendary Ubu Roi, at Nouveau-Théâtre, 15, rue Blanche, with actor Firmin Gémier in the title role. Jarry had finished this epochal play about human greed, cowardice, and stupidity just six months before it would shock the audiences with its unapologetic opening line, "Merdre" and its playfully theatrical, marionette-like performance style. Though Jarry affected an attitude of political indifference, his revolutionary ideas challenged assumptions about society, propriety, and existence. Brockett notes that "Ubu Roi shows in all its grotesqueness a world without human decency." In this lithograph announcement by Jarry for the premiere of Ubu Roi, the obese, tyrannical King Ubu appears as a shadow puppet with a segmented arm. He brandishes a scimitar in one hand and clutches a sack of gold in the other.

=== Temporary Closures ===
By 1899, the Théâtre de l’Oeuvre company had presented 51 programs and toured England, Norway, the Netherlands, Denmark, and Belgium. In spite of this success, Lugné-Poe had come to feel that the work of the Symbolists was juvenile and limiting to his artistic development. He closed the theatre company in 1899, marking an end to the first major phase of the anti-realism movement in European theatre.

Lugné-Poe revived the enterprise on December 22, 1912, with a production of Paul Claudel's L'Annonce faite à Marie. Following that were several works by the Dadaist and Surrealist writers of the era. The group was off to a running start, but activity was interrupted again with the beginning of World War I in August 1914. Through their productions, tours, and critical reviews, the Théâtre de l’Oeuvre, under the direction of Lugné-Poe, had managed to influence "almost every departure from realism between 1893 and 1915." After the War, in 1919, Lugné-Poe reopened the Théâtre de l’Oeuvre—renaming the Salle Berlioz as the Théâtre de l’Oeuvre in the process—with financing from the actor Marcelle Frappa, and he ran the theatre continuously until his final retirement in 1929.

Lucien Beer and Paulette Pax succeeded Lugné-Poe in 1929 and served as the theatre's directors until the beginning of World War II. Shortly after the conflict began, Hitler conquered France and the Vichy Regime under Jacques Hébertot made most theatres illegal in the occupied zone. After the Liberation of Paris in 1944, Raymond Rouleau rejoined Lucien Beer, and together they ran the theatre until 1951, when they were both replaced by Robert de Ribon.

In 1960 Pierre Franck and Georges Herbert took over direction. They ran the theatre until 1978, when they were replaced by Georges Wilson as Artistic Director and principal scenic designer. He remained until 1995 when Gérard Maro, who had been Artistic Director of the Comédie de Paris since 1981, took over as chef of the Théâtre de l'Œuvre. He is still in charge today.

== Notable Théâtre de l'Œuvre Productions ==
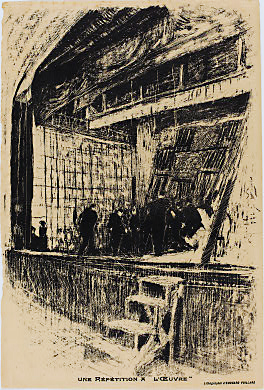
A lithograph by Édouard Vuillard depicting a rehearsal on the stage of the Théâtre de l'Œuvre. The print was used as a program for the play "L'Oasis" by Jean Jullien on December 14, 1903 and for a different production in 1908.

- 1894: Annabella, translated by Maurice Maeterlinck from 'Tis Pity She's a Whore by John Ford.
- 1895: Les Pieds nickelés by Tristan Bernard
- 1896: Salomé by Oscar Wilde
- 1896: Ubu roi by Alfred Jarry, with Firmin Gémier and Harry Baur
- 1897: Le Fardeau de la liberté by Tristan Bernard
- 1911: L’Amour de Kesa by Robert d'Humières, directed by Lugné-Poe
- 1939: Roi de France by Maurice Rostand, directed by Harry Baur
- 1949: La neige était sale by Georges Simenon, adapted by Frédéric Dard, directed by Raymond Rouleau
- 1949: Saint Parapin de Malakoff by Albert Vidalie, directed by Charles Bensoussan, designs by Klementieff, starring Jean Tielment, Denise Bailly, Charles Bensoussan, Chalosse, Jean Rocherot, Sylvie Pelayo, Brigitte Sabouraud, Josette Rateau, Colette Gambier, M. Valo.
- 1950: Notre peau by José-André Lacour, directed by Michel Vitold
- 1955: Un mari idéal [An Ideal Husband] by Oscar Wilde, directed by Jean-Marie Serreau, starring Delphine Seyrig
- Au jour le jour by Jean Cosmos
- À la nuit la nuit by François Billetdoux
- 1957: Vous qui nous jugez written and directed by Robert Hossein
- 1958: L'Épouvantail by Dominique Rolin, directed by André Barsacq, starring Emmanuelle Riva
- 1962: Mon Faust by Paul Valéry, directed by Pierre Franck
- 1965: Le Repos du septième jour by Paul Claudel, directed by Pierre Franck
- 1969: Le Monde est ce qu'il est by Alberto Moravia, directed by Pierre Franck
- 1976: Le Scénario by Jean Anouilh, directed by Jean Anouilh and Roland Piétri
- 1977: Le Cours Peyol by Étienne Rebaudengo
- 1982: Sarah et le Cri de la langouste by John Murrell, directed by Georges Wilson, starring Delphine Seyrig
- 1991: Eurydice by Jean Anouilh, directed by Georges Wilson
- 1998: Horace by Pierre Corneille, directed by Marion Bierry
- 1998: Pour la galerie by Claude d'Anna and Laure Bonin, directed by Stephan Meldegg, with Annick Blancheteau and Jean-Luc Moreau
- 1999: L'Amante anglaise by Marguerite Duras, directed by Patrice Kerbrat, with Suzanne Flon, Jean-Paul Roussillon, Hubert Godon
- 2000: Le Grand Retour de Boris S. by Serge Kribus, directed by Marcel Bluwal, with Michel Aumont, Robin Renucci
- 2003: Hypothèque by Daniel Besse, directed by Patrice Kerbrat, starring Stéphane Hillel
- 2006: Le Gardien [The Caretaker] by Harold Pinter, directed by Didier Long, starring Robert Hirsch
- 2007: À la porte [At the Door] by Vincent Delecroix, directed by Marcel Bluwal, starring Michel Aumont
- 2007: Les Mots et la Chose by Jean-Claude Carrière, starring Jean-Pierre Marielle, Agathe Natanson
- 2007: L'Entretien de M. Descartes avec M. Pascal le jeune by Jean-Claude Brisville, directed by Daniel Mesguich, starring Daniel Mesguich and William Mesguich
- 2008: La Vie devant soi by Romain Gary (Èmile Ajar), directed by Didier Long, starring Myriam Boyer
- 2009: L'Antichambre by Jean-Claude Brisville, directed by Christophe Lidon
- 2010: David & Edward by Lionel Goldstein, directed by Marcel Bluwal, starring Michel Aumont and Michel Duchaussoy
- 2010: Les Dames du jeudi by Loleh Bellon, directed by Christophe Lidon
