= Salome (play) =

Tragedy by Oscar Wilde

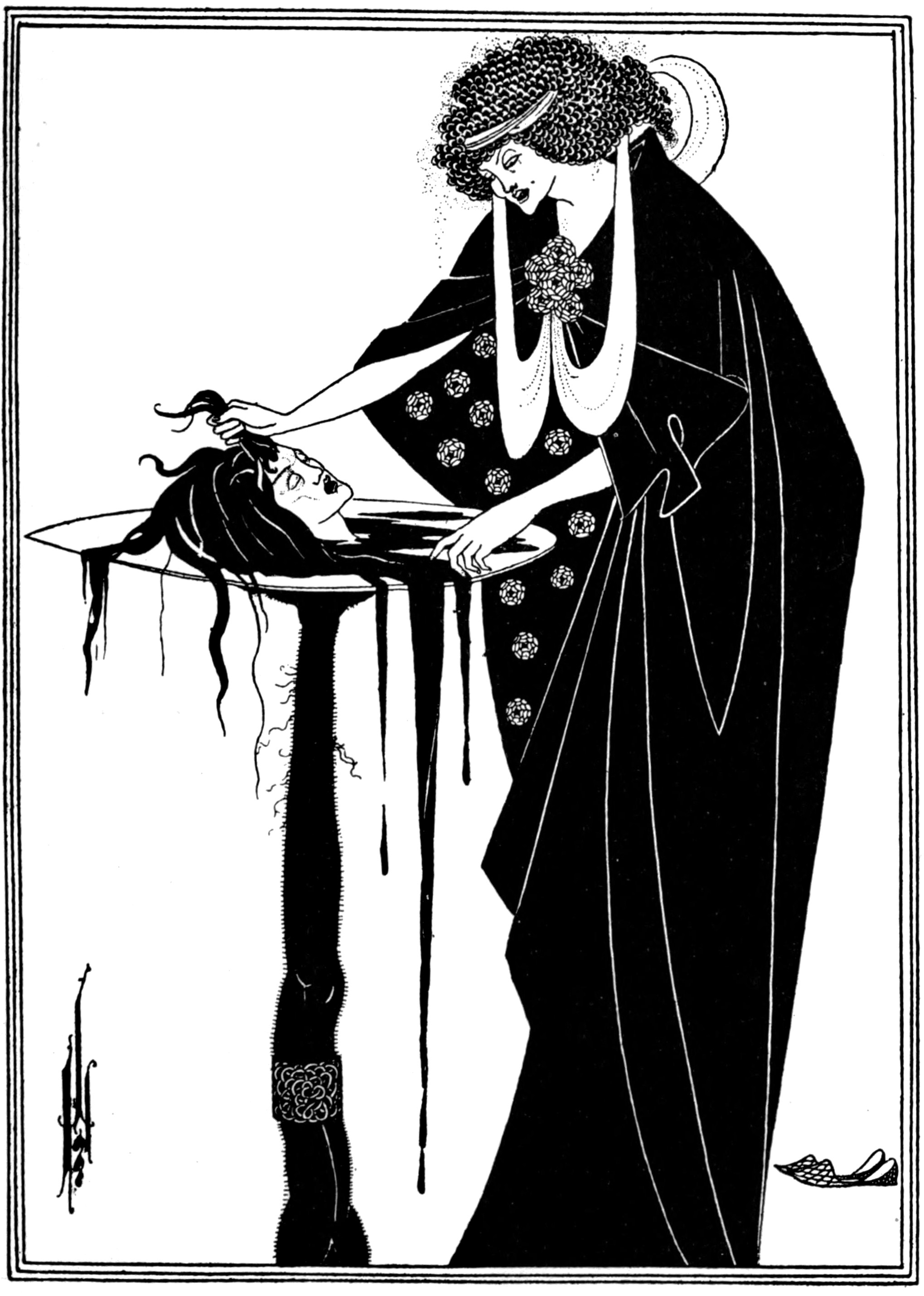
- Illustration by Aubrey Beardsley for the first English edition of the play (1894)
- Original language: French
- Written by: Oscar Wilde
- Genre: Tragedy

Premiere
- Date: 11 February 1896
- Place: Comédie-Parisienne; Paris

Salome (French: Salomé, pronounced [salɔme]) is a one-act tragedy by Oscar Wilde. The original version of the play was first published in French in 1893; an English translation was published a year later. The play depicts the attempted seduction of Jokanaan (John the Baptist) by Salome, stepdaughter of Herod Antipas; her dance of the seven veils; the execution of Jokanaan at Salome's instigation; and her death on Herod's orders.

The first production was in Paris in 1896. Because the play depicted biblical characters it was banned in Britain and was not performed publicly there until 1931. The play became popular in Germany, and Wilde's text was taken by the composer Richard Strauss as the basis of his 1905 opera Salome, the international success of which has overshadowed the play itself. Film and other adaptations have also been made of the play.

== Background and first production ==
When Wilde began writing Salome in late 1891 he was known as an author and critic, but was not yet established as a playwright. Lady Windermere's Fan was completed but not yet staged, and his other West End successes, A Woman of No Importance, An Ideal Husband and The Importance of Being Earnest, were yet to come. Two earlier plays, Vera, Or The Nihilists and The Duchess of Padua, had been staged, but had been critical and commercial failures. Wilde had been considering the subject of Salome since his undergraduate days at Oxford when Walter Pater introduced him to Flaubert's story Hérodias in 1877. The biographer Peter Raby comments that Wilde's interest had been further stimulated by descriptions of Gustave Moreau's paintings of Salome in Joris-Karl Huysmans's À rebours and by Heinrich Heine's Atta Troll, Jules Laforgue's "Salomé" in Moralités Légendaires and Stéphane Mallarmé's Hérodiade.

Wilde wrote the play while staying in Paris and explained to an interviewer the following year why he had written it in French:

I have one instrument that I know I can command, and that is the English language. There was another instrument to which I had listened all my life, and I wanted once to touch this new instrument to see whether I could make any beautiful thing out of it. The play was written in Paris some six months ago, where I read it to some young poets, who admired it immensely. Of course, there are modes of expression that a Frenchman of letters would not have used, but they give a certain relief or colour to the play.

Punch's view of Wilde as a French conscript, when he threatened to take French citizenship over the ban on Salome in Britain

He submitted the play to the leading French actress Sarah Bernhardt, who accepted it for production in her 1892 season at the Royal English Opera House, in London. The play went into rehearsals in June, but at that time all plays presented in Britain had to be approved by the official censor, the Lord Chamberlain. Approval was withheld because of a rule prohibiting the depiction of biblical characters on stage. Wilde expressed outrage and said he would leave England and take French citizenship. Bernhardt too condemned the ban and said she would present the play in Paris at some time, although she could not say when. (Note: The opportunity did not arise, and Bernhardt, who was by this time over 50, never played Salome.)

The play was published in French in 1893 in Paris by the Librairie de l'Art Independent and in London by Elkin Mathews and John Lane. It is dedicated "À mon ami Pierre Louÿs". The author was pleased by the favourable reception given to the published play by leading Francophone writers, in particular Pierre Loti, Maurice Maeterlinck and Mallarmé.

Wilde never saw the play produced. The only performances given in his lifetime were in 1896, by which time he was serving a prison sentence for illegal homosexual activity. The play was first given, in the original French, in a one-off performance on 11 February 1896 by the Théâtre de l'Œuvre company at the Théâtre de la Comédie-Parisienne, as the second part of a double bill with Romain Coolus's comedy Raphaël. (Note: The company later had its own theatre, the Théâtre de l'Œuvre (rue de Clichy), but in 1896 it was based at the Comédie-Parisienne (rue Boudreau) and the Nouveau-Théâtre (rue Blanche).) The main roles were played as follows:

- Iokanaan – Max Barbier
- Hérode – Lugné-Poe
- Young Syrian (Note: In both the French and English texts Salome addresses the Syrian as "Narraboth", but he is not named in the dramatis personae.) – M. Nerey
- A Jew – M. Labruyère
- First Soldier – M. Lévêque
- Salomé – Lina Munte
- Hérodias – Mlle Barbieri
- Page to Hérodias – Suzanne Auclaire

The play was given again in October 1896 in a Wilde double bill at the Nouveau-Théâtre, with a French adaptation of Lady Windermere's Fan. Charles Daumerie played Herod and Munte again played Salome. (Note: In Lady Windermere's Fan, adapted into French as La Passante ("The Passer-by") Munte played Mrs Erlynne, rechristened "Madame Vernon" in this version, and Daumerie was Lord Windermere.)

== English and other translations ==
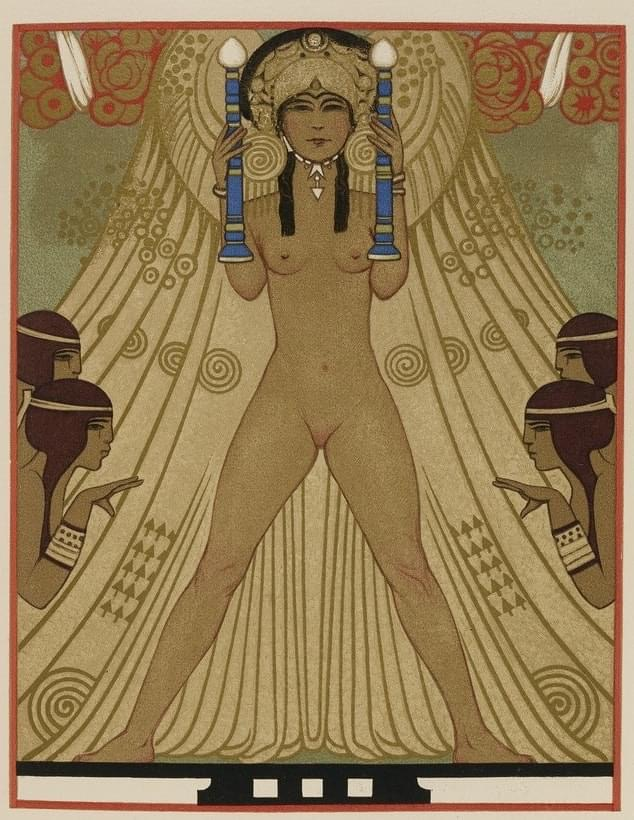
Illustration for Salome, by Manuel Orazi

A biographer of Wilde, Owen Dudley Edwards, comments that the play "is apparently untranslatable into English", citing attempts made by Lord Alfred Douglas, Aubrey Beardsley, Wilde himself revising Douglas's botched effort, Wilde's son Vyvyan Holland, Jon Pope, Steven Berkoff and others, and concluding "it demands reading and performance in French to make its impact". The most familiar English version is by Douglas, extensively revised by Wilde, originally published in 1894. Wilde dedicated the first edition "To my friend Lord Alfred Douglas, the translator of my play". It was lavishly produced, with illustrations by Beardsley that Wilde thought over-sophisticated. (Note: Wilde commented to Charles Ricketts, "Dear Aubrey is almost too Parisian: he cannot forget that he has been to Dieppe – once". Still, Wilde liked the illustrations more than did The Times, which observed, "They are fantastic, grotesque, unintelligible for the most part, and, so far as they are intelligible, repulsive … a joke, and it seems to us a very poor joke".) An American edition, with the Beardsley illustrations, was published in San Francisco in 1896. In the 1890s and 1900s translations were published in at least eleven other languages, from Dutch in 1893 to Yiddish in 1909. (Note: The other languages were Czech (1905), German (1903), Greek (1907), Hungarian (1908), Italian (1906), Polish (1904), Russian (1904), Spanish (1908) and Swedish (1895).)

== Plot ==
=== Characters ===
- Herod Antipas, Tetrarch of Judea
- Jokanaan, the Prophet
- The young Syrian, Captain of the guard
- Tigellinus, a young Roman
- A Cappadocian
- A Nubian
- First soldier
- Second soldier
- The page of Herodias
- Jews, Nazarenes, etc.
- A slave
- Naaman, the Executioner
- Herodias, Wife of the Tetrarch
- Salome, daughter of Herodias
- The slaves of Salomé

=== Synopsis ===
Jokanaan (John the Baptist, Iokanaan in the original French text) has been imprisoned by Herod Antipas in a cistern below the terrace of Herod's palace, for his hostile comments about Herodias, Herod's second wife. A young captain of the guard admires the beautiful princess Salome, Herod's stepdaughter. A page warns the captain that something terrible may happen if he continues to stare at the princess. Salome is fascinated by Jokanaan's voice. She persuades the captain to open the cistern so that the prophet can emerge, and she can see him and touch him. Jokanaan appears, denouncing Herodias and her husband. At first frightened by the sight of the holy man, Salome becomes fascinated by him, begging him to let her touch his hair, his skin and kiss his mouth. When she tells him she is Herodias's daughter, he calls her a "daughter of Sodom" and bids her keep away from him. All Salome's attempts to attract him fail, and he swears she will never kiss his mouth, cursing her as the daughter of an adulteress and advising her to seek the Lord. He returns to his underground confinement. The young captain of the guard, unable to bear Salome's desire for another man, fatally stabs himself.

Herod appears from the palace, looking for the princess and commenting on the strange look of the moon. When he slips in the captain's blood, he suddenly panics. Herodias dismisses his fears and asks him to go back inside with her, but Herod's attention has turned libidinously towards Salome, who rejects his advances. From the cistern, Jokanaan resumes his denunciation of Herodias; she demands that Herod hand the prophet over to the Jews. Herod refuses, maintaining that Jokanaan is a holy man and has seen God. His words spark an argument among the Jews concerning the true nature of God, and two Nazarenes talk about the miracles of Jesus. As Jokanaan continues to accuse her, Herodias demands that he is silenced.

Lina Munte as Salome in the first production (1896)

Herod asks Salome to dance for him. She refuses, but when he promises to give her anything she wants, she agrees. Ignoring her mother's pleas – "Ne dansez pas, ma fille" – "Do not dance, my daughter" – Salome performs the dance of the seven veils. (Note: In the original, Wilde instructs "Salomé danse la danse des sept voiles". The title of the dance is his own invention.) Delighted, Herod asks what reward she would like, and she asks for the head of Jokanaan on a silver platter. Horrified, Herod refuses, while Herodias rejoices at Salome's choice. Herod offers other rewards, but Salome insists and reminds Herod of his promise. He finally yields. The executioner descends into the cistern, and Salome impatiently awaits her reward. When the prophet's head is brought to her, she passionately addresses Jokanaan as if he were still alive and finally kisses his lips:

Ah! j'ai baisé ta bouche, Iokanaan, j'ai baisé ta bouche. Il y avait une âcre saveur sur tes lèvres. Était-ce la saveur du sang? ... Mais, peut-être est-ce la saveur de l'amour. On dit que l'amour a une âcre saveur ... Mais, qu'importe? Qu'importe? J'ai baisé ta bouche, Iokanaan, j'ai baisé ta bouche.	Ah! I have kissed thy mouth, Jokanaan, I have kissed thy mouth. There was a bitter taste on thy lips. Was it the taste of blood? ... But perchance it is the taste of love. ... They say that love hath a bitter taste. ... But what of that? what of that? I have kissed thy mouth, Jokanaan.

Herod, frightened and appalled at Salome's behaviour, orders the soldiers, "Tuez cette femme!" – "Kill that woman!", and they crush her to death under their shields.

== Revivals ==
=== International ===
In 1901, within a year of Wilde's death, Salome was produced in Berlin by Max Reinhardt in Hedwig Lachmann's German translation, and ran, according to Robbie Ross, for "a longer consecutive period in Germany than any play by any Englishman, not excepting Shakespeare". The play was not revived in Paris until 1973 (although Richard Strauss's operatic version was frequently seen there from 1910 onwards). Les Archives du spectacle record 13 productions of Wilde's play in France between 1973 and 2020.

The American premiere was given in New York in 1905 by the Progressive Stage Society, an amateur group. A professional production was presented at the Astor Theatre the following year, with Mercedes Leigh in the title role. The Internet Broadway Database records five New York productions between 1918 and 2003. The Salomes included Madame Yorska (1918), Evelyn Preer (1923), Sheryl Lee (1992) and Marisa Tomei (2003), and among the actors playing Herod was Al Pacino in 1992 and 2003. The 1923 Broadway production with Preer was unusual in that it used an entirely black cast which included Sydney Kirkpatrick as Herod Antipas and Kirkpatrick's wife, Laura Bowman, as Herodias.

The play was given in Czech in Brno in 1924, and in English at the Gate Theatre in Dublin in 1928 (directed by Hilton Edwards, with Micheál Mac Liammóir as Jokanaan). In Tokyo in 1960 Yukio Mishima directed a Japanese version in a translation by Kōnosuke Hinatsu which, The Times reported, "rendered Wilde's rhetoric into the measured cadences of fifteenth-century Japanese". A later Japanese production was seen in Tokyo and subsequently in France in 1996.

=== Britain ===
In Britain, the Lord Chamberlain's consent to public performance still being withheld, the first production there was a private one, given in May 1905 in London by the New Stage Club. The performance of Robert Farquharson as Herod was reportedly of remarkable power. Millicent Murby played Salome, and Florence Farr directed. A second private performance followed in 1906 by the Literary Theatre Society, with Farquharson again as Herod. The costumes and scenery by Charles Ricketts were much admired, but the rest of the cast and the direction were poor, according to Ross. A 1911 production at the Court Theatre by Harcourt Williams, with Adeline Bourne as Salome, received disparaging notices.

The ban on public performance of Salome was not lifted until 1931. The last private production, earlier that year, featuring a dance of the seven veils choreographed by Ninette de Valois, was judged "creepily impressive" by The Daily Telegraph. For the first sanctioned public production, at the Savoy Theatre, Farquharson reprised his Herod, with real-life mother and daughter casting, Nancy Price and Joan Maude as Herodias and Salome. The production was deemed tame and unthrilling, and the play – "gone modest and middle class" as one critic put it – was not seen again in the West End for more than twenty years.

A 1954 London revival, a vehicle for the Australian actor Frank Thring, made little impact, and it was not until Lindsay Kemp's 1977 production at the Roundhouse that Salome was established as a critical and box-office success, running for six months in repertory with Kemp's adaptation of Our Lady of the Flowers. That version was a free adaptation of the original, with an all-male cast, switching between French and English texts and using only about a third of Wilde's dialogue. A 1988 production by Steven Berkoff in which he played Herod, was seen at the Gate Theatre, the Edinburgh Festival and at the National Theatre, London. It focused on Wilde's words, relying on the skills of the actors and the imagination of audiences to evoke the setting and action. A 2017 production by the Royal Shakespeare Company, described as "gender fluid", featured a male actor, Matthew Tennyson, as Salome.

== Critical reception ==
Title page of first edition, 1893

In Les Annales du théâtre et de la musique, Edouard Stoullig reported that press reviews had been generally benevolent out of protest at the harsh treatment received by Wilde in Britain. In Stoullig's view the play was a good piece of rhetoric marred by too many "ridiculous repetitions" of lines by minor characters. In Le Figaro Henry Fouquier shared Stoullig's view that the piece owed something to Flaubert, and thought it "an exercise in romantic literature, not badly done, a little boring". The reviewer in Le Temps said, "M. Wilde has certainly read Flaubert, and cannot forget it. The most interesting thing about Salome is the style. The work was written in French by M. Wilde. It is full of very elaborate and ornate verses. The colours, the stars, the birds, the rare gems, everything that adorns nature, has provided M. Wilde with points of comparison and ingenious themes for the stanzas and antistrophes that Salome's characters utter". La Plume said, "Salomé has almost all the qualities of a poem, the prose is as musical and fluid as verse, full of images and metaphors".

When banning the original 1892 production of Salome, the responsible official in the Lord Chamberlain's office commented privately, "The piece is written in French – half Biblical, half pornographic – by Oscar Wilde himself. Imagine the average British public's reception of it". In Britain the critics in general either ignored or disparaged the play. The Times described it as "an arrangement in blood and ferocity, morbid, bizarre, repulsive, and very offensive in its adaptation of scriptural phraseology to situations the reverse of sacred". The Pall Mall Gazette suggested that the play was far from original: "the reader of Salome seems to stand in the Island of Voices, and to hear around him and about the utterances of friends, the whisperings of demigods" – particularly Gautier, Maeterlinck and above all Flaubert – "There is no freshness in Mr Wilde's ideas; there is no freshness in his method of presenting those ideas". New York reviewers were not impressed when the play was first professionally produced there in 1906: The Sun called it "bloodily degenerate"; The New-York Tribune thought it "decadent stuff, not worthy of notice".

Raby comments that later criticism of the play "has tended to treat it either as a literary text or as a theatrical aberration". The historian John Stokes writes that Salome is a rare instance in British theatrical history of an authentically Symbolist drama. Symbolist authors rejected naturalism and used "poetic language and pictorial settings to invoke the inner lives of characters", expressing without the constraints of naturalism all kinds of emotions "both spiritual and sensual".

== Themes and derivatives ==
Critics have analysed Wilde's use of images favoured by Israel's kingly poets and references to the moon, his depiction of power-play between the sexes, his filling in of gaps in the biblical narrative and his invention of the "dance of the seven veils".

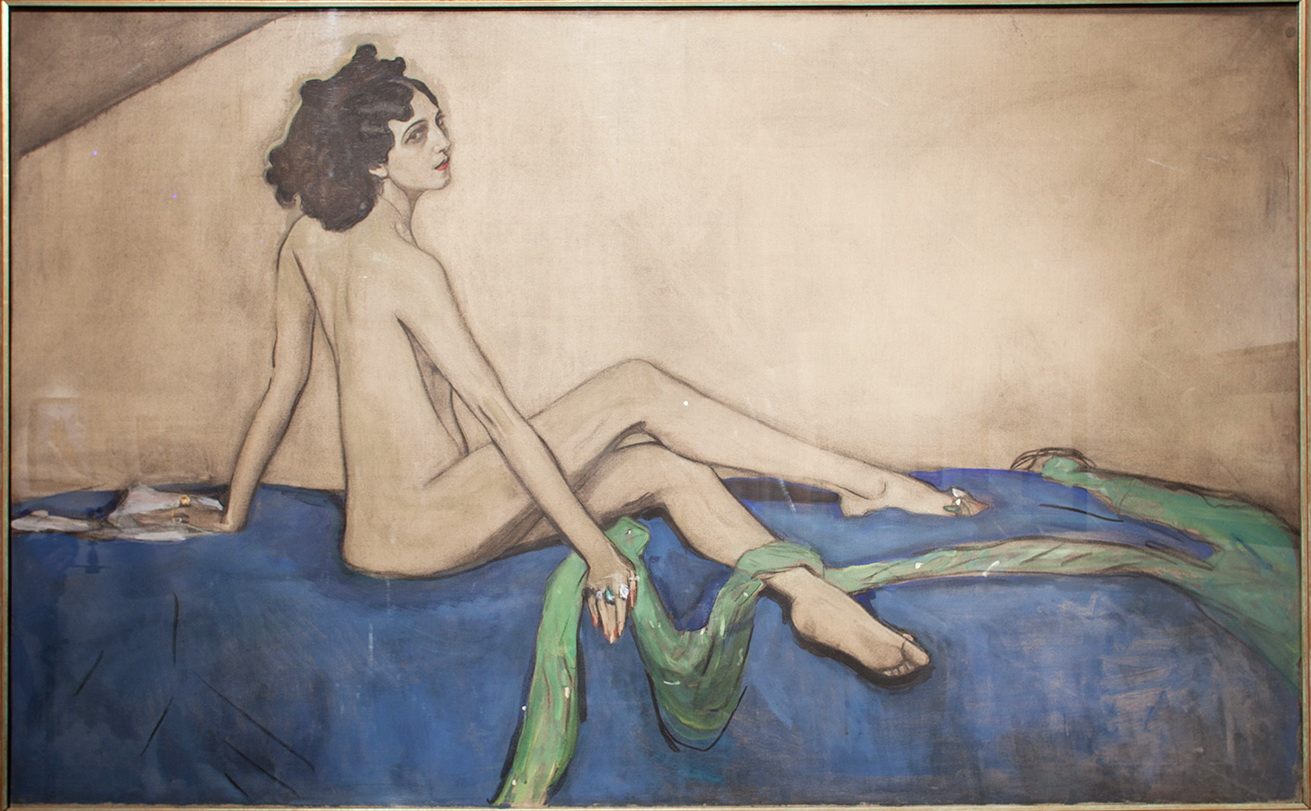
Ida Rubinstein as Salome

Wilde's version of the story spawned several other artistic works, the most famous of which is Richard Strauss's opera of the same name. Strauss saw Wilde's play in Berlin in November 1902 at Reinhardt's Little Theatre, with Gertrud Eysoldt in the title role. He began to compose his opera in summer 1903, completing it in 1905 and premiering it later the same year. Critics including Horst Schroeder have argued that the international success of Strauss's adaptation "virtually drove Wilde's drama in its original form off the stage".

There have been numerous adaptations and interpretations of Wilde's Salome, on stage and screen and in the visual arts. In St Petersburg in 1908 Mikhail Fokine created a ballet based on the play, with music by Glazunov and décor by Léon Bakst. Ida Rubinstein played Salome. For the cinema, Salome was first filmed in an American silent version directed by J. Stuart Blackton in 1908, with Florence Lawrence as Salome and Maurice Costello as Herod, followed by an Italian version in 1910. Later adaptations include a 1918 silent film starring Theda Bara, a 1923 silent version directed by Charles Bryant starring Alla Nazimova as Salome and Mitchell Lewis as Herod, and a 2013 sound adaptation directed by and starring Al Pacino, with Jessica Chastain as Salome. Excerpts from the play featured prominently in Ken Russell's 1988 film Salome's Last Dance.

== Notes, references and sources ==
=== Sources ===
- Barnaby, Paul (2010). "Performance Timeline of the European Reception of Oscar Wilde". In Stefano Evangelista (ed.). The Reception of Oscar Wilde in Europe. London and New York: Continuum. ISBN 978-1-84-706005-1.
- Dierkes-Thrun, Petra (2014). Salome's Modernity: Oscar Wilde and the Aesthetics of Transgression. Ann Arbor: University of Michigan Press. ISBN 978-0-47-203604-2.
- Donohue, Joseph (1997). "Distance, death and desire in Salome". In Peter Raby (ed.). The Cambridge Companion to Oscar Wilde. Cambridge and New York: Cambridge University Press. ISBN 978-0-52-147471-9.
- Ellman, Richard (1988). Oscar Wilde. London: Hamish Hamilton. ISBN 978-0-24-112392-8.
- Kaplan, Joel (1997). "Wilde on the stage". In Peter Raby (ed.). The Cambridge Companion to Oscar Wilde. Cambridge and New York: Cambridge University Press. ISBN 978-0-52-147471-9.
- Osborne, Charles (1988). The Complete Operas of Richard Strauss. London: O'Mara. ISBN 978-0-94-839751-6.
- Raby, Peter (2008). "Introduction". Oscar Wilde: The Importance of Being Earnest and Other Plays. Oxford and New York: Oxford University Press. ISBN 978-0-19-953597-2.
- Stoullig, Edmond (1897). Les Annales du théâtre et de la musique, 1896. Paris: Ollendorff. OCLC 172996346.
- Tanitch, Robert (1999). Oscar Wilde on Stage and Screen. London: Methuen. ISBN 978-0-41-372610-0.
- Walton, Chris (2010). "Composing Oscar: settings of Wilde for the German stage". In Stefano Evangelista (ed.). The Reception of Oscar Wilde in Europe. London and New York: Continuum. ISBN 978-1-84-706005-1.
- Wilde, Oscar (1918) [1910]. Salomé; La Sainte Courtisane; A Florentine Tragedy. London: Methuen. OCLC 485278059.
- Wilde, Oscar (1950). Salome and Other Plays. London: Penguin. OCLC 1071305437.
