= Boulevard de l'Amiral-Bruix =

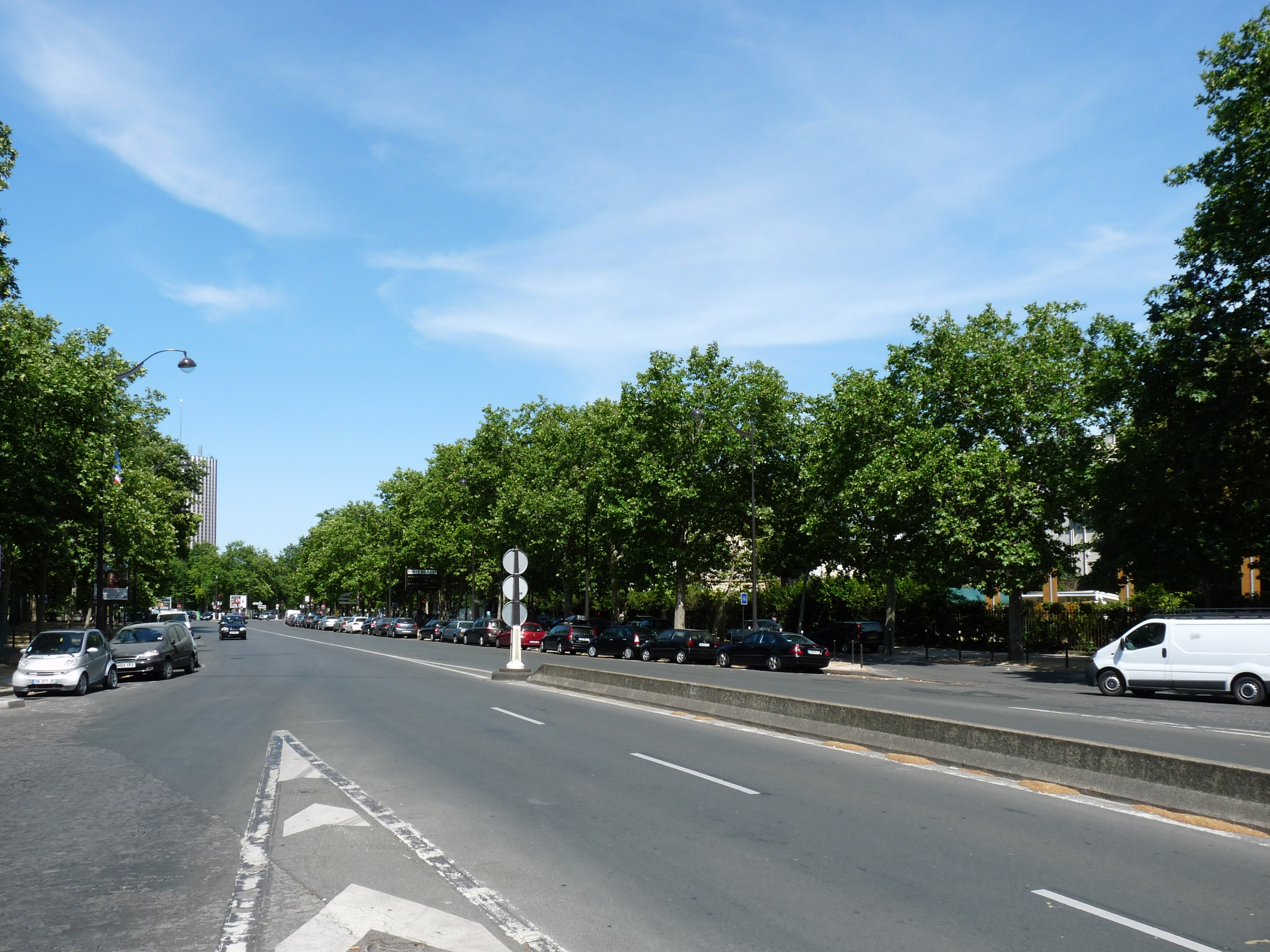
- Boulevard de l'Amiral-Bruix
- Interactive map of Boulevard de l'Amiral-Bruix
- Part of: Boulevard Lannes (1864-1932)
- Namesake: Étienne Eustache Bruix
- Type: boulevard
- Owner: Paris
- Length: 720 m (2,360 ft)
- Width: 40 metres (130 ft)
- Location: 48.8749°N 2.2786°E
- From: Avenue de Malakoff
- To: 161 avenue de Malakoff place de la Porte-Maillot

The Boulevard de l'Amiral-Bruix is a boulevard in the 16th arrondissement of Paris, France. It is one of the Boulevards of the Marshals that circle the outer parts of the city.

== Location ==
The Boulevard de l'Amiral-Bruix starts at the Avenue de Malakoff and ends at the Place du Maréchal-de-Lattre-de-Tassigny. It is 720 metres (2,360 ft) long and 40 metres (130 ft) wide.

== History ==
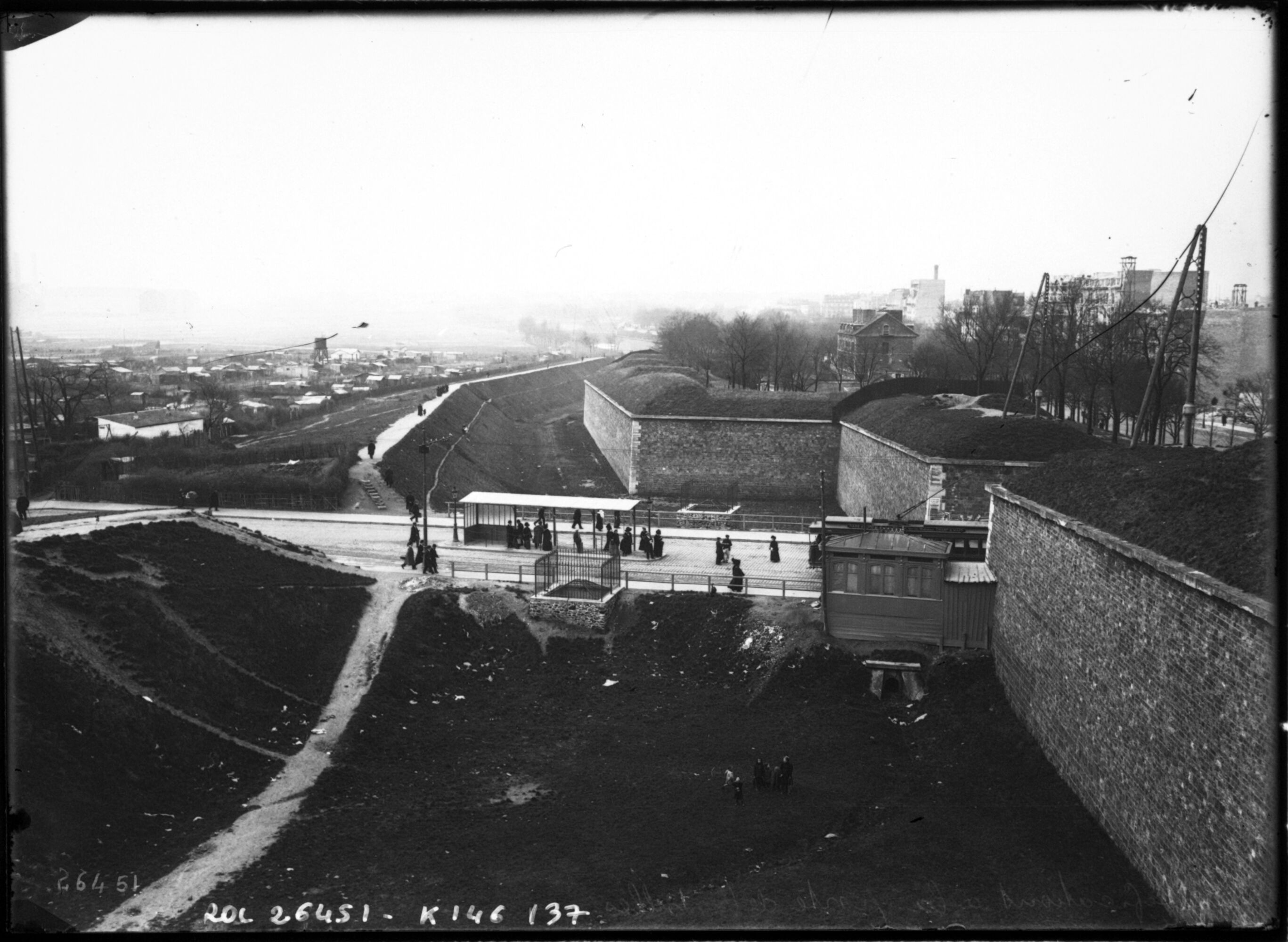
A portion of the Thiers wall, the military structure and moat that later was replaced by the various Boulevards of the Marshals

The French war department had completed the Thiers wall – including fortifications, a dry moat, a Rue Militaire and a large berm – around 1840. In 1859, the military engineering service gave conditional control to the Paris city council. The expansion of the land area of Paris in 1860, by annexing bordering communities, created a situation where everything within the Thiers wall was Paris and everything without was not. The Thiers wall, with its accompanying berm and moat, led to a profound disruption and complication of the synergistic relationship between Paris and its suburbs.

Paris city council started upgrading and conversion of some sections of the Rue Militaire into boulevards in 1861, with the (yet unnamed) Boulevard de l'Amiral-Bruix one of the first stretches to open. In 1864, the boulevard was named after Jean Lannes (1769–1809), Duke of Montebello, Prince of Siewierz and Marshal of France. Each section of the upgraded Rue Militaire was then named for a marshal of the First French Empire (1804–1814) who served under Napoleon, leading to the entire ring being collectively called the Boulevards of the Marshals. The Boulevards of the Marshals concept was almost fully realized by 1932, with the original 19 boulevards named for Lefebvre or one of his fellow First Empire marshals.

In 1932, Paris chose to recognize the famed French Admiral Étienne Eustache Bruix (1759–1805) by renaming a portion of Boulevard Lannes as Boulevard de l'Amiral-Bruix. Bruix, who was a Vice admiral and had resigned as Minister of the Navy in July 1799, was one of Napoleon's confidants during the planning of the November 1799 Coup of 18 Brumaire. After seizing power, Napoleon promoted Bruix to admiral, and later appointed him as Conseiller d'État. This is one of only three Boulevards of the Marshals which do not bear the name of a marshal of France.

The final two sections of the Boulevards of the Marshals (named for 20th century generals Jean Simon and Martial Henri Valin), bringing the total to 22 and closing the ring, would not be completed until 2005.
