= William Mesguich =

French actor and director (born 1972)

William Mesguich (born 1972) is a French actor and director, the son of theatre director Daniel Mesguich. With Philippe Fenwick, he created La Compagnie de l'Étreinte in 1998.

== Theatre ==
- Hippolyte by Robert Garnier
- 1980 : Athalie by Racine, directed by Roger Planchon, TNP Villeurbanne, Théâtre national de l'Odéon
- Marie Tudor by Victor Hugo
- L’Histoire qu’on ne connaîtra jamais by Hélène Cixous
- The Trojan Women by Seneca the Younger
- Fin de partie by Samuel Beckett
- L’Échange by Paul Claudel
- Alice Droz by Miguel Angel Sevilla
- Fin du monde chez Gogo
- 1996: La Périchole by Jacques Offenbach, directed by Robert Angebaud, Théâtre du Jour Agen
- 1998: La Légende des porteurs de souffle by Philippe Fenwick
- 1999: Des saisons en enfer by Pierre Bourgeade and Marius Constant, directed by Daniel Mesguich, Espace Pierre Cardin
- 1999: La Seconde Surprise de l'amour by Marivaux, directed by Daniel Mesguich, Théâtre de l'Athénée-Louis-Jouvet
- 2000: The Prince of Homburg by Heinrich von Kleist, directed by Daniel Mesguich, Comédie de Saint-Étienne, Théâtre de l'Athénée-Louis-Jouvet
- 2001: The Devil and the Good Lord by Jean-Paul Sartre, directed by Daniel Mesguich, Théâtre de l'Athénée-Louis-Jouvet
- 2003: Antony and Cleopatra by William Shakespeare, directed by Daniel Mesguich, Théâtre de l'Athénée-Louis-Jouvet
- 2003: Tartuffe by Molière, directed by Pierre Debauche
- 2003: Exit the King by Eugène Ionesco, directed by Pierre Debauche
- 2003: Paul Schippel ou le prolétaire bourgeois by Carl Sternheim, directed by Jean-Louis Benoit, Théâtre de la Criée, Théâtre national de Nice, Théâtre de la Commune
- 2004: Il était une fois… les Fables by Jean de La Fontaine, directed by William Mesguich, Théâtre Georges Simenon Rosny sous Bois
- 2004: As You Like It by William Shakespeare, directed by William Mesguich, Théâtre Georges Simenon Rosny sous Bois, Théâtre 13
- 2004: Tohu-Bohu, [directed by William Mesguich, Espace Rachi Paris
- 2004: Monsieur Septime, Solange et la casserole by Philippe Fenwick, directed by William Mesguich, L’Atalante Paris, Théâtre Victor Hugo Bagneux
- 2005: The Prince of Homburg by Heinrich von Kleist, directed by Daniel Mesguich, Théâtre de la Criée, Théâtre de l'Athénée-Louis-Jouvet
- 2005: Il était une fois… les Fables by Jean de La Fontaine, directed by William Mesguich, Sudden Théâtre
- 2006: Ruy Blas de Victor Hugo, directed by William Mesguich, Scène Watteau Nogent-sur-Marne, Théâtre Mouffetard
- 2006: Comment devient-on chamoune ? by Charlotte Escamez, directed by William Mesguich, Théâtre Georges Simenon Rosny sous Bois, Sudden Théâtre
- 2006: Confusion, la Légende de l’étoile by Philippe Fenwick, directed by William Mesguich, Théâtre Georges Simenon Rosny sous Bois
- 2007: L'Entretien de M. Descartes avec M. Pascal le jeune by Jean-Claude Brisville, directed by Daniel Mesguich, Théâtre de l'Œuvre
- 2007: La Veuve, la couturière et la commère by Charlotte Escamez, directed by William Mesguich, L’Atalante Paris
- 2008: Du cristal à la fumée by Jacques Attali, directed by Daniel Mesguich, Théâtre du Rond-Point
- 2008: L'Entretien de M. Descartes avec M. Pascal le jeune by Jean-Claude Brisville, directed by Daniel Mesguich, tour
- 2008: La Belle et la bête by Jeanne-Marie Leprince de Beaumont, directed by William Mesguich, Théâtre Mouffetard, Théâtre du Chêne noir
- 2008: Ruy Blas by Victor Hugo, directed by William Mesguich, Théâtre du Chêne Noir
- 2009: L'Entretien de M. Descartes avec M. Pascal le jeune by Jean-Claude Brisville, directed by Daniel Mesguich, tour
- 2009: L'Initiatie show, directed by William Mesguich, gymnase de l'initiative
- 2009: Il était une fois ... la création du monde, directed by William Mesguich, Bouffes Parisiens
- 2010: Life Is a Dream by Pedro Calderón de la Barca, directed by William Mesguich, Théâtre 13, Théâtre des 13 vents
- 2010: L'Entretien de M. Descartes avec M. Pascal le jeune by Jean-Claude Brisville, directed by Daniel Mesguich, Théâtre national de Nice
- 2010: L'Histoire du soldat by Charles-Ferdinand Ramuz, Igor Stravinski, directed by William Mesguich
- 2010: Il était une fois... les fables by Jean de La Fontaine, directed by William Mesguich, Théâtre de la Criée
- 2010: Agatha by Marguerite Duras, directed by Daniel Mesguich, with William Mesguich and Sarah Mesguich, Théâtre du Chêne Noir-Avignon
- 2013: Hamlet directed by Daniel mesguich, with william mesguish au théâtre national de Nice.
- 2015–2017: Noces de Sang by Federico García Lorca directed by William Mesguich, Chêne noir Avignon and tour in France
- 2019: Dans les forêts de Sibérie adapted from Sylvain Tesson eponymous book.

== Filmography ==
Television

- 2008: Voici venir l'orage... by Nina Companeez
- 2009: Louis XV, le soleil noir by Thierry Binisti
- 2010: Du cristal à la fumée by Philippe Miquel
- 2010: Chateaubriand by Pierre Aknine
- 2011: La Très Excellente et Divertissante Histoire de François Rabelais by Hervé Baslé

== See also ==
- List of French actors
- List of theatre directors in the 20th and 21st centuries
