= Lugné-Poe =

French actor and director

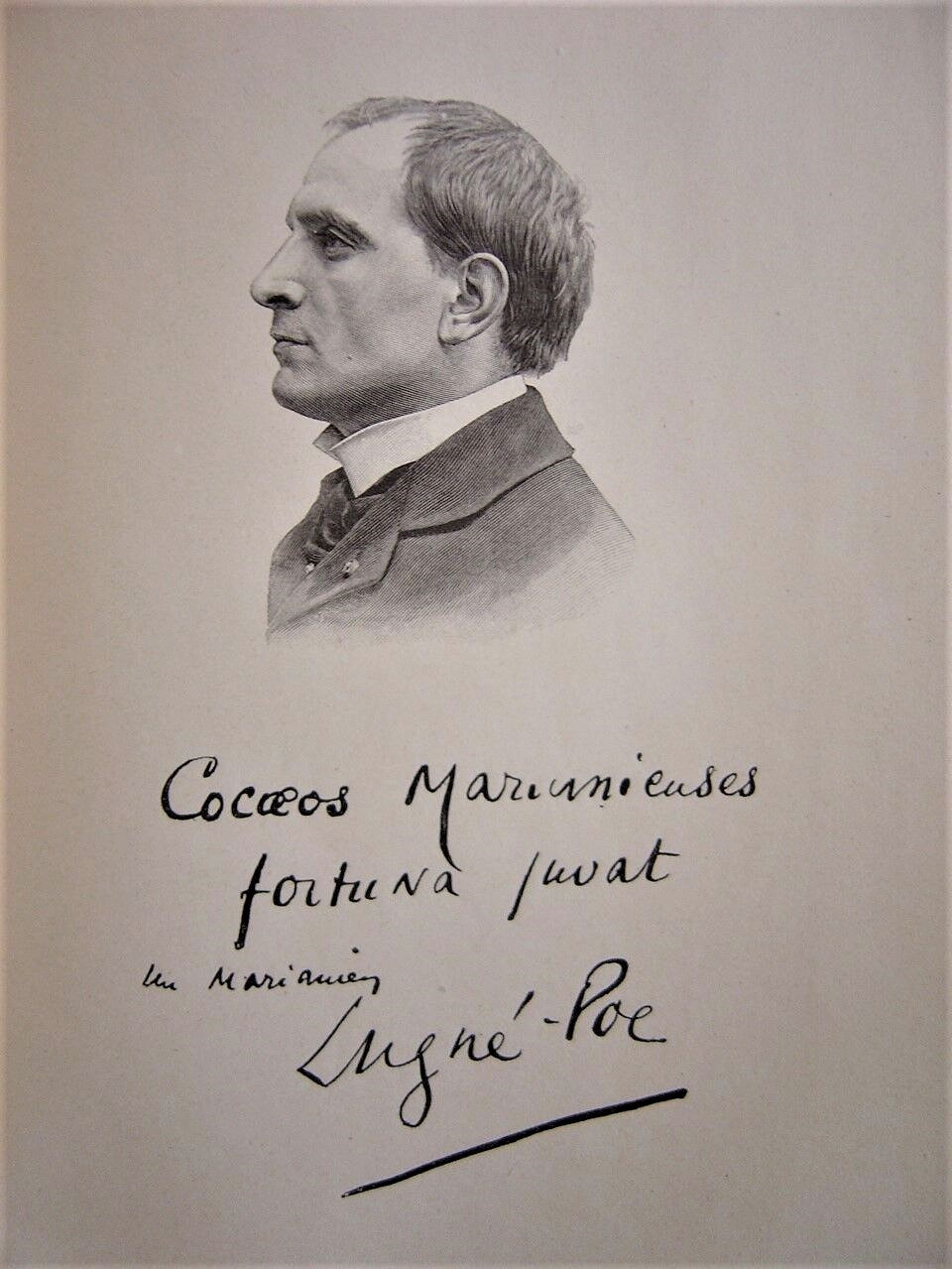
- Lugné-Poe in Figures contemporaines tirées de l’Album Mariani. Etching c. 1903.
- Born: Aurélien Marie Lugné; 27 December 1869; Paris, France
- Died: 19 June 1940 (aged 70); Villeneuve-les-Avignon, France
- Education: Paris Conservatoire (1889–1891)
- Known for: Theatre Director, Designer
- Movement: Symbolism
- Spouse: Suzanne Desprès
- Awards: Officier, Lègion d'Honneur

Aurélien-Marie Lugné (27 December 1869 – 19 June 1940), known by his stage and pen name Lugné-Poe, was a French actor, theatre director, and scenic designer. He founded the landmark Paris theatre company, the Théâtre de l'Œuvre, which produced experimental work by French Symbolist writers and painters at the end of the nineteenth century. Like his contemporary, theatre pioneer André Antoine, he gave the French premieres of works by the leading Scandinavian playwrights Henrik Ibsen, August Strindberg, and Bjørnstjerne Bjørnson.

== Early career ==
In 1887, at age 17, Lugné-Poe and friend Georges Bourdon created an amateur theatre group called le Cercle des Escholiers, which sought to perform "unpublished or, at the very least, little-known works." As he prepared to audition for the Paris Conservatory, he changed his name from Lugné to "Lugné-Poe" in homage to Edgar Allan Poe. While the Conservatory rejected his audition in fall 1887, they accepted him in fall 1888; days later he joined André Antoine's Théâtre Libre, a subscriber-based Naturalist independent theatre. After appearing in the first play of that season under his own name, Lugné-Poe adopted the stage names "Philippon," "Delorme," and "Leroy" for the duration of his association with Antoine's company.

Lugné-Poe continued acting lessons at the Conservatory under the great Comédie-Française star Gustave Worms while appearing in Théâtre Libre's 1888-1889 season and the first half of the next. But tensions grew over the next year as Antoine bullied and blamed his actors, including Lugné-Poe, for weak performances. After their falling out while on tour in Belgium in early 1890, Lugné-Poe concentrated on his Conservatory competition showcases, winning a First-Place certificate for Comedy in early 1890. His obligation to fulfill military service in the fall, however, suspended his theatrical rise. Before his departure, he had already befriended a group of painters known as The Nabis, and publicized their work in a series of articles.

Returning from an abbreviated military service in early spring 1891, Lugné-Poe joined Paul Fort's Théâtre d'Art, first appearing in Maurice Maeterlinck's L'Intruse. For the next two years, he moved regularly between acting for the Théâtre d'Art and directing for his former company Le Cercle des Escholiers. Lugné-Poe performed in ten plays altogether for Fort, interpreting, most notably, the Maeterlinck rôles of the Old Man in L'Intruse (1891) and the First Blind Man in Les Aveugles (1891), as well as Satan in Jules Bois' Les Noces de Sathan (1892). He, along with Georgette Camée, forged the signature Symbolist acting style that conveys a reverie, with its hieratic movement and gestures, matched with solemn, psalmodized line readings. After the disappointing plays of the March 28, 1892 program, Fort called a halt to the Théâtre d'Art. Lugné-Poe put his talents to staging and acting in noteworthy plays with the Cercle des Escholiers, which culminated with Ibsen's The Lady from the Sea (1892). It was only the fourth French-translated Ibsen play to open in Paris, after Antoine's landmark productions of Ghosts in 1890 and The Wild Duck in 1891, and Albert Carré's production of Hedda Gabler in December 1891. When Lugné-Poe reconstituted the Théâtre d'Art as the Théâtre de l'Œuvre in 1893, he would make Ibsen his specialty in Paris theatre, premiering (and often starring in) nine Ibsen plays between 1893 and 1897.

== Théâtre de l'Œuvre ==
Like Paul Fort before him, Lugné-Poe never secured a permanent stage for the entire run of his company's initial art-theatre experiment. The Théâtre de l'Œuvre debuted with Maeterlinck's Pelléas et Mélisande for a single matinée performance at the Théâtre des Bouffes-Parisiens in May 1893, but the six engagements in his next season occurred at the distant Théâtre des Bouffes du Nord, where he premiered Ibsen's Rosmersholm, An Enemy of the People, and The Master Builder, Gerhart Hauptmann's Lonely Lives, and Bjørnstjerne Bjørnson's Beyond Human Power, among others. For the May 1894 production of Henri Bataille and Robert d'Humières' Sleeping Beauty, he secured Nouveau-Théâtre's space for the first time. Though he concluded the season with August Strindberg's Creditors at the newly built Comédie-Parisienne (later known as Louis Jouvet's Théâtre de l'Athénée), he quickly assumed the directorship of Nouveau-Théâtre for most of the 1894-95 season. There he premiered Maeterlinck's adaptation of John Ford's 'Tis Pity She's a Whore (Annabella), Beaubourg's The Mute Voice, Strindberg's The Father, Śūdraka's The Little Clay Cart, and Maeterlinck's Interior, among others. While his May 1895 productions (including Ibsen's Little Eyolf) were staged at the Théâtre des Menus-Plaisirs, he returned to Nouveau-Théâtre to conclude the season with Ibsen's Brand.

The 1895-96 season found residence at two locations. Lugné-Poe staged the first half of the season back at the Comédie-Parisienne, with a line-up that included Thomas Otway's Venice Preserved, Kālidāsa's The Ring of Shakuntalā, and Oscar Wilde's Salome. The second half, however, starting in March 1896, began over two-years' residency for the Théâtre de l'Œuvre at Nouveau-Théâtre. Most notably, they premiered Ibsen's Pillars of Society (22-23 June 1896) and Peer Gynt (11-12 November 1896); Alfred Jarry's Ubu Roi (9-10 December 1896); Bjørnson's sequel to Beyond Human Power (25-26 January 1897); Hauptmann's fairy drama The Sunken Bell (4-5 March 1897); Bataille's Your Blood (7-8 May 1897); Ibsen's Love's Comedy (22-23 June 1897) and John Gabriel Borkman (8-9 November 1897); Nikolai Gogol's The Inspector General (7-8 January 1898); and Romain Rolland's Aert (2-3 May 1898) and The Wolves (18 May 1898). For their last season, the Théâtre de l'Œuvre gave two undistinguished premieres—Paul Sonniès' Fausta (15-16 May 1899) and Lucien Mayrargue's The Yoke (5-6 June 1899)—preferring to hold the much anticipated revival of An Enemy of the People at the grander Théâtre de la Renaissance in February. Lugné-Poe's last productions for the company were done at the very theatre where the Théâtre de l'Œuvre had begun in 1893 with Pelléas et Mélisande: the Théâtre des Bouffes-Parisiens. By the close of the nineteenth century, Lugné-Poe's company had successfully established half a dozen Parisian theatres as sites for daring, challenging, and at times outrageous modern drama.

In 1895, Jakub Grein and the Independent Theatre Society invited Lugné-Poe and his troupe to present a season of Ibsen's Rosmersholm, The Master Builder, and Maurice Maeterlinck's symbolist L'Intruse and Pelléas and Mélisande in London.

== Productions ==
Théâtre des Bouffes-Parisiens

- 1893: Pelléas et Mélisande (Maurice Maeterlinck)
- 1898: La Victoire (Bouhélier)
- 1898: Solness le constructeur (Henrik Ibsen, translated by Prozor)
- 1899: Entretien d'un philosophie avec la maréchale de XXX (Diderot)
- 1899: Le Triomphe de la raison (Rolland)

Théâtre des Bouffes du Nord

- 1893: Rosmersholm (Henrik Ibsen, translated by Prozor)
- 1893: Un Ennemi du peuple (Henrik Ibsen, translated by Chennevière and Johansen)
- 1893: Ames solitaires (Gerhart Hauptmann, translated by Cohen)
- 1894: L'Araignée de cristal (Rachilde)
- 1894: Au-dessus des forces humaines (Björnstjerne-Björnson, translated by Prozor)
- 1894: Une Nuit d'avril à Céos (Trarieux)
- 1894: L'Image (Beaubourg)
- 1894: Solness le construsteur (Henrik Ibsen, translated by Prozor)

Nouveau-Théâtre

- 1894: La Belle au bois dormant (Bataille and d'Humières)
- 1894: La Vie muette (Beaubourg)
- 1894: Père (August Strindberg, translated by Loiseau)
- 1894: Un Ennemi du peuple (Henrik Ibsen, translated by Chennevière and Johansen)
- 1895: Le Chariot de terre cuite (Barrucand)
- 1895: La Scène (Lebey)
- 1895: La Vérité dans levin ou les Désagréments de la galanterie (Collé)
- 1895: Intérieur (Maurice Maeterlinck)
- 1895: Brand (Henrik Ibsen, translated by Prozor)
- 1896: La Fleur palan enlevée (Arène)
- 1896: L'Errante (Quillard)
- 1896: La Dernière croisade (Gray)
- 1896: Hérakléa (Villeroy)
- 1896: La Brebis (Sée)
- 1896: Les Soutiens de la société (Henrik Ibsen, translated by Bertrand and Nevers)
- 1896: Peer Gynt (Henrik Ibsen)
- 1896: Ubu roi ou les Polonais (Alfred Jarry)
- 1896: Le Tandem (Trézenick and Soulaine)
- 1897: La Motte de terre (Dumur)
- 1897: Au delà des forces humaines (Björnstjerne-Björnson, translated by Monnier and Littmanson)
- 1897: La Cloche engloutie (Gerhart Hauptmann, translated by Hérold)
- 1897: Ton Sang (Bataille)
- 1897: Le Fils de l'abbesse (Herdey)
- 1897: La Comédie de l'amour (Henrik Ibsen, translated by Colleville and Zepelin)
- 1897: Jean-Gabriel Borkman (Henrik Ibsen, translated by Prozor)
- 1898: Le Revizor (Nikolai Gogol)
- 1898: Rosmersholm (Henrik Ibsen, translated by Prozor)
- 1898: Le Gage (Jourdain)
- 1898: L'Échelle (Zype)
- 1898: Le Balcon (Heiberg, translated by Prozor)
- 1898: Aërt (Rolland)
- 1898: Morituri ou les Loups (Rolland)
- 1899: Fausta (Sonniès)
- 1899: Le Joug (Mayrargue)
- 1900: La Cloître (Verhaeren)
- 1901: Le Roi candaule (André Gide)\
- 1902: Monna Vanna (Maurice Maeterlinck)
- 1902: Manfred (Lord Byron, adapted by Forthuny)
- 1903: La Roussalka (Schuré)
- 1903: Le Maître de Palmyre (Wilbrandt, translated by Renon, Bénon, and Zifferer)
- 1903: L'Oasis (Jullien)
- 1904: Philippe II (Verhaeren)
- 1904: Polyphème (Samain)
- 1904: Oedipe à Colone (Sophocles, adapted by Gastambide)
- 1904: L'Ouvrier de la dernière heure (Guiraud)
- 1904: Les Droits du coeur (Jullien)
- 1904: Le Jaloux (Bibesco)
- 1905: La Gioconda (D'Annunzio, translated by Hérelle)
- 1905: La Fille de Jorio (D'Annunzio, translated by Hérelle)
- 1905: Dionysos (Gasquet)
- 1905: Dans les bas-fonds (Gorky, translated by Halperine-Kaminsky)
- 1906: Le Réformateur (Rod)
- 1906: Le Cloaque (Labry)

Comédie-Parisienne

- 1894: Frères (Bang, translated by Colleville and Zepelin)
- 1894: La Gardienne (Régnier)
- 1894: Les Créanciers (August Strindberg, translated by Loiseau)
- 1895: Venise sauvée (Otway, translated by Pène)
- 1895: L'Anneau de Çakuntala (Kalidasa, adapted by Hérold)
- 1896: Une Mère (Ameen, translated by Prozor)
- 1896: Brocéliande (Lorrain)
- 1896: Les Flaireurs (Lerberghe)
- 1896: Des mots! des mots! (Quinel and Dubreuil)
- 1896: Raphaël (Coolus)
- 1896: Salomé (Oscar Wilde)
- 1896: La Lépreuse (Henry Bataille)

Théâtre du Ménus-Plaisirs

- 1895: L'École de l'idéal (Vérola)
- 1895: Le Petit Eyolf (Henrik Ibsen, translated by Prozor)
- 1895: Le Volant (Paul Claudel)

Salle de Trianon, Paris

- 1906: Madame la marquise (Sutro)
- 1906: Le Troisième Couvert (Savoir)
- 1906: Leurs Soucis (Bahr)

Théâtre Marigny

- 1904: La Prophétie (Toussaint)
- 1906: Pan (Charles van Lerberghe)
- 1906: L'Héritier naturel (Keim)
- 1907: L'Amie des sages (Allou)
- 1907: Petit Jean (Buysieulx and Max)
- 1908: Hypatie (Barlatier)
- 1908: Acquitté (Antona-Traversi, translated by Lécuyer)
- 1908: Les Vieux (Rameil and Saisset)
- 1908: La Madone (Spaak)
- 1909: Le Roi bombance (Marinetti)
- 1909: Nonotte et Patouillet (du Bois)

Théâtre Grévin

- 1907: Une Aventure de Frédérick Lemaître (Basset)
- 1907: Placide (Séverin-Malfayde and Dolley)
- 1907: Zénaïde ou les caprices du destin (Delorme and Gally)

Théâtre Fémina

- 1907: La Tragédie florentine (Oscar Wilde)
- 1907: Philista (Battanchon)
- 1907: Le Droit au bonheur (Lemonnier and Soulaine)
- 1907: Un Rien (Valloton)
- 1907: Le Baptême (Savoir and Nozière)
- 1907: Mendès est dans la salle (Marchès and Vautel)
- 1908: La Loi (Jourda)
- 1908: Vae Victis (Duterme)
- 1908: Les Amours d'Ovide (Mouézy-Eon, Auzanet, and Faral)
- 1908: Au Temps des fées (Blanchard)
- 1908: Elektra (Hofmannsthal, adapted by Strozzi and Epstein)
- 1908: Le Jeu de la morale et du hasard (Bernard)
- 1908: La Dame qui n'est plus aux camélias (Faramond)
- 1909: Perce-Neige et les sept gnomes (Dortzal, Adapted from Snow White by the Brothers Grimm)
- 1909: La Chaîne (Level and Monnier)
- 1910: La Sonate à Kreutzer (Savoir and Nozière, adapted from Tolstoy)
- 1910: Le Mauvais Grain (Faramond)
- 1910: Le Poupard (Bouvelet)
- 1911: Malazarte (Aranha)

Théâtre Antoine

- 1911: Sur le seuil (Battanchon)
- 1911: Un Médecin de campagne (Bordeaux and Denarié)
- 1911: Les Oiseaux (Nozière)
- 1912: Anne ma soeur (Auzanet)
- 1912: La Charité s.v.p. (Speth)
- 1912: Futile (Bernouard)
- 1912: Le Visionnaire (Renaud)
- 1912: Ce Bougre d'original (Soulages)
- 1912: Le Candidat Machefer (Hellem and D'Estoc)
- 1912: Ariane blessée (Allou)
- 1912: Les Derniers Masques (Schnitzler, translated by Rémon and Valentin)
- 1914: La Danse des fous (Birinski, adapted by Rémon)

Théâtre du Palais-Royal

- 1912: La Dernière Heure (Frappa)
- 1912: Grégoire (Falk)
- 1912: Morituri (Prozor)

Théâtre Malakoff, Paris

- 1912: L'Annonce faite à Marie (Paul Claudel)
- 1913: La Brebis égarée (Jammes)
- 1914: L'Otage (Paul Claudel)

Théâtre de l'Œuvre, Cité Monthiers

- 1894: Annabella (translated by Maurice Maeterlinck from 'Tis Pity She's a Whore by John Ford.)
- 1895: Les Pieds nickelés (Bernard)
- 1897: Le Fardeau de la liberté (Bernard)
- 1910: L'Amour de Kesa (Humières)
- 1920: La Couronne de carton (Sarment)
- 1920: Le Cocu magnifique (Crommelynck)
- 1921: Les Scrupules de Sganarelle (Régnier)
- 1921: Sophie Arnoux (Nigoud)
- 1921: Le Pêcheur d'ombres (Sarment)
- 1921: La Danse de mort (August Strindberg, translated by Rémon)
- 1921: Comité secret (Lourié)
- 1921: Madonna Fiamma (Ségur)
- 1922: L'Age heureux (Jacques Natanson)
- 1922: Dardamelle (Mazaud)
- 1922: Le Dilemme du docteur (George Bernard Shaw)
- 1922: La Dette de Schmil (Orna)
- 1922: Le Visage sans voile (Allou)
- 1922: Le Retour d'Ivering (Holt)
- 1922: Le Lasso (Batty-Weber)
- 1922: L'Enfant truqué (Natanson)
- 1923: La Dame allègre (Puig and Ferreter, translated by Pierat)
- 1923: La Messe est dite (Achard)
- 1923: Le Cadi et le cocu (Mille and Loria)
- 1923: Est-ce possible? (Birabeau)
- 1923: Passions de fantoches (San Secondo, translated by Mortier)
- 1923: On finit souvent par où on devrait commencer (Turpin)
- 1923: La Maison avant tout (Hamp)
- 1923: Berniquel (Maurice Maeterlinck)
- 1923: L'Autre Messie (Soumagne)
- 1924: Le Feu à l'Opéra (Kaiser, translated by Goll)
- 1924: Irène exigeante (Beaunier)
- 1924: Le Mort à cheval (Ghéon)
- 1924: La Farce des encore (Thuysbaert and Ghéon)
- 1924: L'Amour est un Étrange maître (Worms-Barretta)
- 1924: Philippe le zélé (Trintzius and Valentin)
- 1924: L'Égoïste (Orna)
- 1924: La Profession de Madame Warren (George Bernard Shaw)
- 1924: La Maison ouverte (Passeur)
- 1925: Le Génie camouglé (Fabri)
- 1925: La Femme de feu (Schoenherr, translated by Lindauer)
- 1925: La Traversée de Paris à la nage (Passeur)
- 1925: Une Demande en mariage (Anton Chekhov)
- 1925: Je Rectifie les visages (Trintzius and Valentin)
- 1925: La Fleur sous les yeux (Martini, translated by Ponzone)
- 1925: Tour à terre (Salacrou)
- 1926: Les Danseurs de gigue (Soumagne)
- 1926: Ariel (Marx)
- 1926: Poisson d'avril ou les griffes du destin (adapted from Colpartage, translated by Lindauer)
- 1926: La Jeune Fille de la popote (Passeur)
- 1926: L'Ancre noire (Brasseur)
- 1926: Ville moderne (Modave)
- 1927: L'Avons-nous tuée? (Datz)
- 1927: Le Déraillement du T.P. 33 (Hamp)
- 1927: Le Bourgeois romanesque (Blanchon)
- 1927: Un Homme en or (Ferdinand)
- 1927: Les Deux Amis (Savoir)
- 1927: Le Conditionnel passé (Bruyez)
- 1927: Un Homme seul (Sauvage)
- 1927: Une Bourgeoise (Francen)
- 1927: Télescopage (Demont)
- 1927: L'Ile lointaine (Ginisty)
- 1928: Madame Marie (Soumagne)
- 1928: La Halte sur la grand route (Jabès)
- 1928: La Foire aux sentiments (Ferdinand)
- 1928: Hommes du monde (Brasseur)
- 1928: Tu Pourrais ne pas m'aimer (Brasseur)
- 1928: Les Trois Langages (Charmel)
- 1928: Celui qui voulait jouer avec la vie (François)
- 1928: Le Cercle (Maugham, adapted by Carbuccia)
- 1929: Jules, Juliette et Julien (Bernard)

Other Paris Theatres

- 1895: Carmosine (Musset), Ministère du Commerce
- 1896: Le Grand Galeoto (Echegaray), home of Ruth Rattazzi
- 1898: Mesure pour mesure (William Shakespeare), Cirque d'été
- 1899: Noblesse de la terre (Faramond), Théâtre de la Renaissance
- 1899: Un Ennemi du peuple (Henrik Ibsen, translated by Chennevière and Johansen), Théâtre de la Renaissance
- 1900: Monsieur Bonnet (Faramond), Théâtre du Gymnase
- 1911: Le Philanthrope ou la Maison des amours (Bouvelet), Théâtre Réjane
- 1913: Le Baladin du monde occidental (Synge, translated by Bourgeois), Salle Berlioz
