= Jean-Claude Brisville =

French writer, playwright, novelist and author for children

- Born: 28 May 1922; Bois-Colombes
- Died: 11 August 2014 (aged 92); Chatou
- Occupations: Writer; Playwright

Jean-Claude Brisville (28 May 1922 – 11 August 2014) was a French writer, playwright, novelist and author for children. A screenwriter, in particular for the film Beaumarchais, l'insolent, he obtained the Grand Prix du théâtre of the Académie française in 1989 for all his body of work.

Recognition came later, in the same year, with Le Souper, a theatre play featuring Joseph Fouché and Charles-Maurice de Talleyrand-Périgord during an evening in 1815 when they decided together to impose a monarchical regime on invaded France. It was the film adaptation that Édouard Molinaro realized in 1992, Claude Brasseur taking the role of Fouché and Claude Rich that of Talleyrand, which made him discover by the general public.

== Biography ==
The son of an industrialist installed at Asnières, Jean Claude Brisville, fed during his adolescence of the novels by José Moselli, began his professional life at the Liberation of France as a literary journalist. An esteemed but confidential poet, playwright and essayist, he worked for the Hachette publishing house then became a reader for the Éditions Julliard. In 1957, he wrote and published the first study about Albert Camus who made him his last secretary until 1959. The family responsibilities made him renounce the risky profession of playwright and devote himself entirely to that of publisher. In 1964, after he became a literary director, he made Ernst Jünger known in France by publishing a new edition of the "Journal de guerre", thanks to the determination of Christian Bourgois.

In 1970, he established a lasting friendship with Julien Gracq who accepted the adaptation he wrote for the television production that Jean-Christophe Averty did of the Beau Ténébreux.

In 1976, he was appointed director of Le Livre de Poche. His dismissal in 1981 at the age of sixty, made him reconnect with his pen and settle his accounts with the medium of publishing in the form of a satirical piece, Le Fauteuil à bascule where an editor is opposed to an avid boss. The success of the play at the Petit Odéon and the Théâtre de l'Est parisien led him, after several failures with other creations, to resume the process of dialogue between two characters, each incarnating a cause opposite to the other, Descartes and Blaise Pascal for reason and faith, the marquise du Deffand and Julie de Lespinasse for the old and the modern, Talleyrand and Fouché for political genius and arrivism, Napoléon and Hudson Lowe for tragic destiny and honest pettiness. It is in L'Antichambre that he expressed all his melancholy for a French language in the process of disappearance.

In 1984, he approached René Char, a brother in writing of Albert Camus. Starting in 1997, he began a work of "anamnesis" "Not to be alien to oneself" which he published, faithful to existentialism, in the form of fragments of the past which related less to his person than to their times, memories mixed with aphorisms with pessimistic humor.

Jean-Claude Brisville was a Chevalier of the Légion d'honneur and Officier of the Ordre des Arts et des Lettres.

== Works ==
=== Theatre ===
- 1946: Les Emmurés, three-act play, directed by Émile Dars, Théâtre du Vieux-Colombier
- 1955: Saint-Just
- 1972: Le Rôdeur - Nora - Le Récital, three 1-act plays with 3 characters (1970)
- 1982: Le Fauteuil à bascule
- 1983: Le Bonheur à Romorantin
- 1985: L'Entretien de M. Descartes avec M. Pascal le jeune
- 1986: La Villa bleue
- 1989: Le Souper
- 1991: L'Antichambre
- 1993: Contre-jour
- 1995: La Dernière Salve
- 2007: Sept comédies en quête d'acteurs

=== Essays ===
- 1948: Prologue
- 1954: La Présence réelle
- 1959: Camus, la Bibliothèque idéale, NRF Éditions Gallimard
- 1998: De mémoire (Souvenirs)
- 2006: Quartiers d'hiver (Souvenirs)
- 2009: Rien n'est jamais fini (Souvenirs)

=== Novels ===
- 1954: D'un amour, Prix Sainte-Beuve
- 1962: La Fuite au Danemark
- 1972: La Petite Marie, published by Gallimard, under the pseudonym Sylvain Saulnier)
- 1976: La zone d'ombre
- 1982: La Révélation d'une voix et d'un nom
- 2002: Vive Henri IV

=== Tales ===
- 1975: Les Trèfle de Longue-Oreille. Première aventure : Petit Trèfle en péril (Éditions Grasset Jeunesse)
- 1975: Les Trèfle de Longue-Oreille. Deuxième aventure : Lançons le cerf-volant (Grasset Jeunesse)
- 1975: Les Trèfle de Longue-Oreille. Troisième aventure : Et hop dans le chapeau (Grasset Jeunesse)
- 1973: Un hiver dans la vie de Gros-Ours (Grasset Jeunesse)
- 1977: L'Enfant qui voulait voir la mer (Jean-Pierre Delarge éditeur, Prix des 50 plus beaux livres 1977)
- 1978: Oleg, le léopard des neiges (tale for children)
- 1981: Le Ciel inévitable, illustrations by Jean Garonnaire (Éditions de l’amitié)
- 1981: Oleg retrouve son royaume (tale for children)

=== Screenwriter ===
- 1970: La nuit se lève by Roland-Bernard (TV)
- 1984: Le Bonheur à Romorantin by Alain Dhénaut (TV)
- 1992: The Supper by Édouard Molinaro
- 1996: Beaumarchais, l'insolent by Édouard Molinaro after a play by Sacha Guitry

Actor

- Délit mineur by Francis Girod
