= Daniel Mesguich =

French actor and director (born 1952)

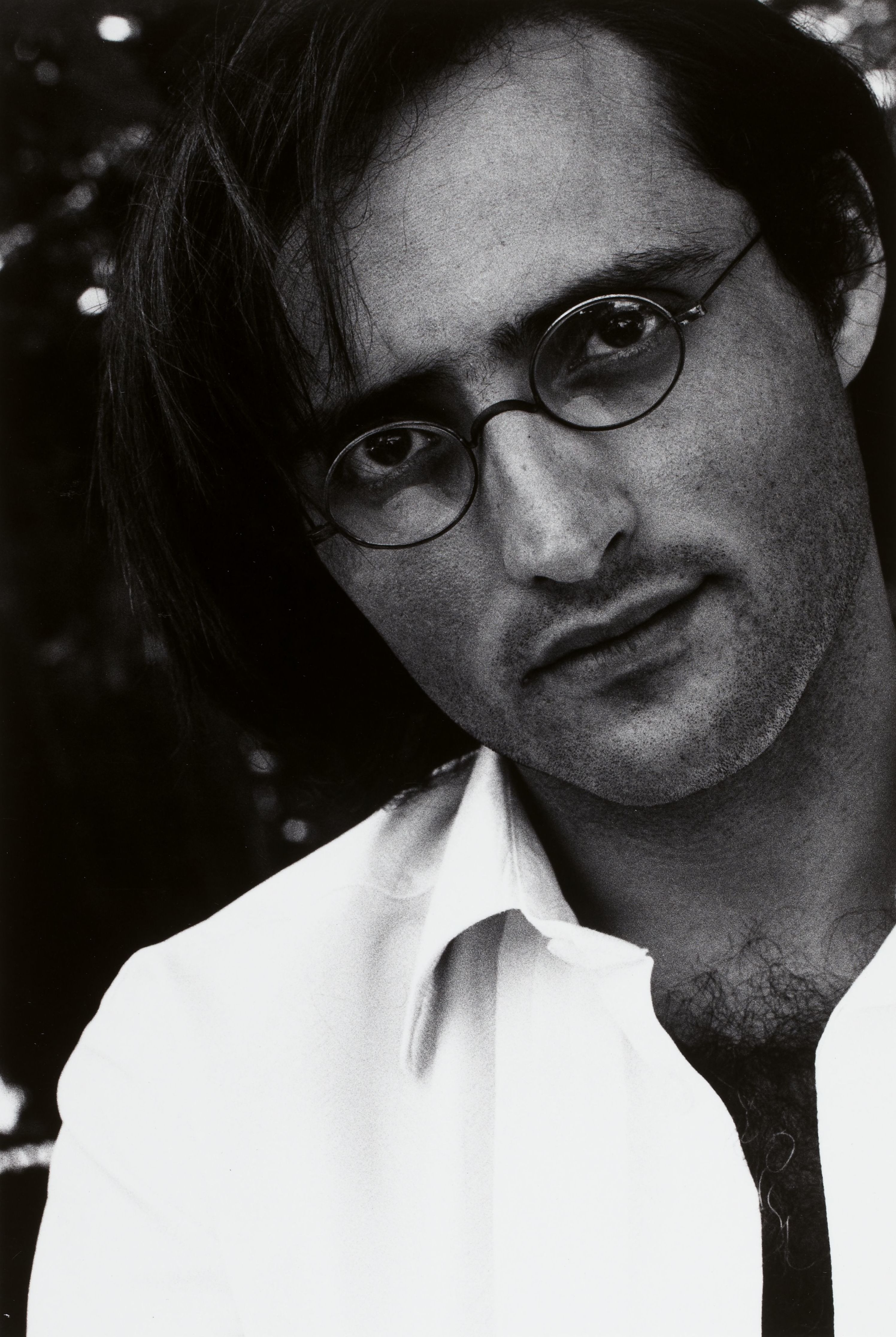
- Daniel Mesguich
- Born: 15 July 1952 (age 74); Algiers, French Algeria (now Algeria)
- Occupations: Actor; Director
- Years active: 1974–present

Daniel Mesguich (born 15 July 1952) is a French actor and director in theater and opera, and professor of stage acting school.

== Biography ==
In 1970, he was admitted into the Conservatoire National Supérieur d'Art Dramatique, after which he opened the Théâtre du Miroir ("Mirror Theater"), with whom he opened a course in drama. After ten years, he returned to the school to teach at the request of Jean-Pierre Miquel, becoming the youngest professor on campus. He is currently the director of the school.

He has acted in over a hundred plays, fifty operas in France and abroad, and some 40 movies and television pieces.

The actor William Mesguich is his son.

== Actor ==
- 1978: Molière by Ariane Mnouchkine
- 1978: Le Dossier 51 by Michel Deville
- 1979: Love on the Run by François Truffaut
- 1980: The Lady Banker by Francis Girod
- 1981: Quartet by James Ivory
- 1983: La Belle captive by Alain Robbe-Grillet
- 1990: L'Autrichienne by Pierre Granier-Deferre (as Fouquier-Tinville)
- 1994: Jefferson in Paris by James Ivory
- 1996: Limited Edition by Bernard Rapp
- 2001: The Musketeer by Peter Hyams (as King Louis XIII)
- 2003: Le Divorce by James Ivory
- 2012: Capital by Costa-Gavras
- 2021: Everything Went Fine by François Ozon
- 2025: Kaamelott: The Second Chapter by Alexandre Astier
