= L'Arlésienne (Bizet) =

1872 music by Georges Bizet to Alphonse Daudet's play

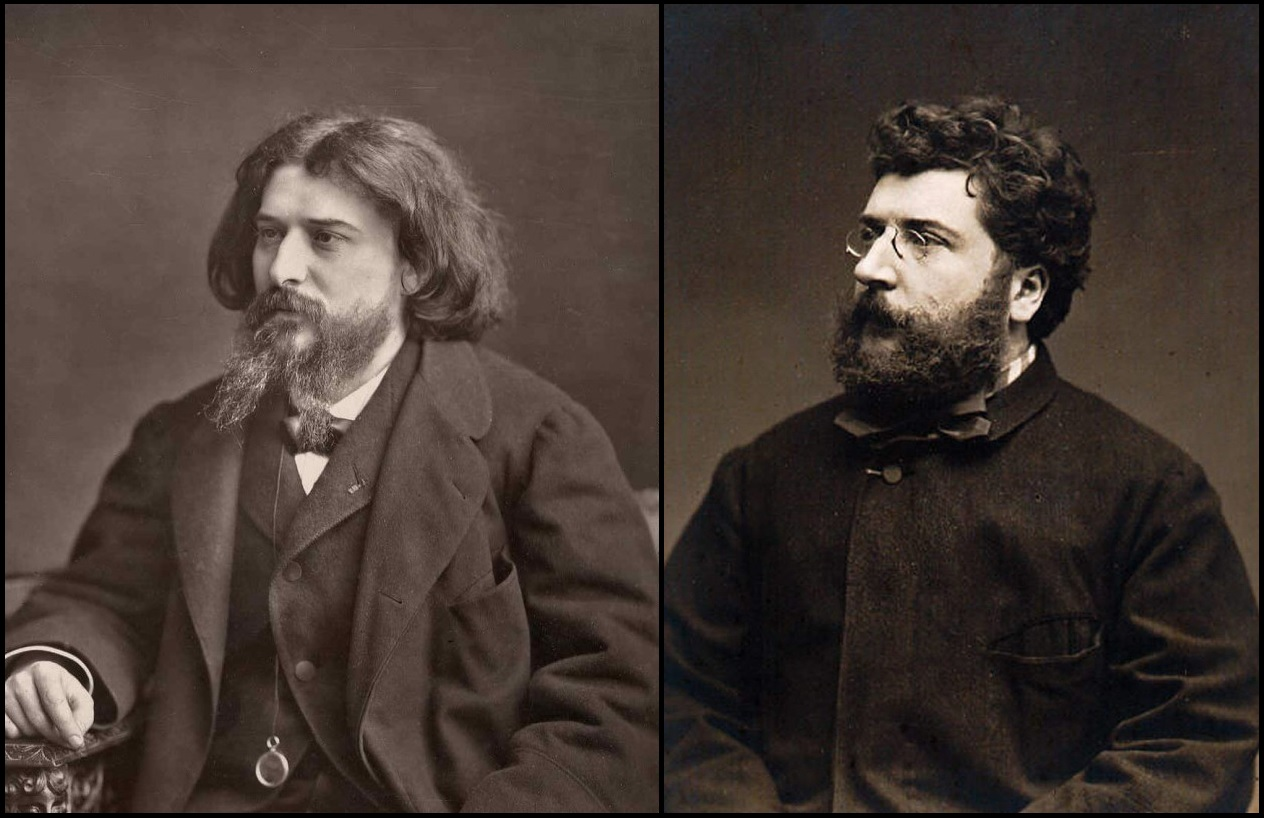
Alphonse Daudet (1840–1897) and Georges Bizet (1838–1875)

L'Arlésienne (The woman from Arles) is incidental music composed by Georges Bizet for Alphonse Daudet's drama of the same name. It was first performed on 30 September 1872 at the Théâtre du Vaudeville in Paris. Bizet's original incidental music consists of 27 numbers for chorus and small orchestra, ranging from pieces of background music (mélodrames) only a few measures long, to entr'actes. The score achieves powerful dramatic ends with the most economic of means. Still, the work received poor reviews in the wake of the unsuccessful premiere and is not often performed now in its original form, although recordings are available. However, key pieces of the incidental music, most often heard in the form of two suites for full orchestra, have become some of Bizet's most popular compositions.

== History ==
=== Composition history ===
In July 1872, Léon Carvalho, the new director of the Théâtre du Vaudeville, having previously collaborated with Bizet in producing his operas The Pearl Fishers (1863) and The Fair Maid of Perth (1867) at the Théâtre Lyrique, commissioned him to write music for his new venture—L'Arlésienne, a play by Alphonse Daudet. Although the drama was based on the author's short story of the same name, first published in the newspaper L'Événement (The Event, 1866), and later in his collection Lettres de mon moulin (Letters from My Windmill, 1869), the plot was originally inspired by a real event: the suicide of a nephew of writer Frédéric Mistral as a consequence of amour fou. Carvalho planned to relieve the bleak tragedy of this "rustic drama" by presenting the play with music and choruses. "The piece is a little too sombre for my theatre", said Carvalho, "but I think the music will be a powerful attraction and it will soften somewhat the cruelty of the play." However, there was some risk in this approach, as this genre ("mélodrame") was in decline.

L'Arlésienne, incidental music, Op. 23 (1872)

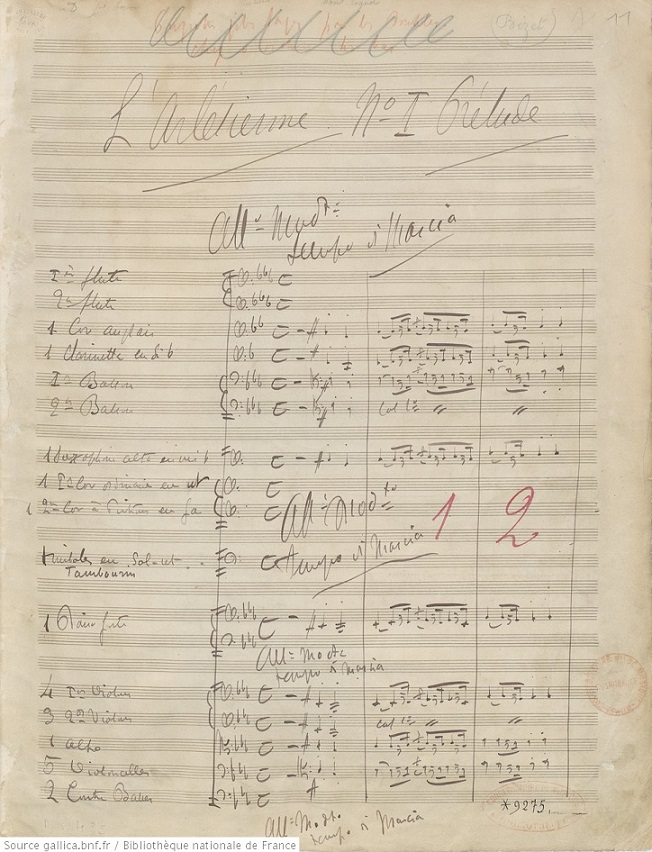
First page of Bizet's manuscript of L'Arlésienne in the Bibliothèque nationale de France; the column on the left lists the 26 instrumentalists of the premiere production.

Bizet composed 27 numbers for the five act play, which was presented in three acts and five scenes. Half of the numbers, mostly mélodrames, are quite short (under 20 measures) and are designed to be performed as background music for spoken drama. On the other hand, seven numbers, including the Prélude, four entr'actes (later known as the Pastorale, Intermezzo, Minuetto, and Carillon), one longer mélodrame (the Adagietto) and the Farandole, are both distinctive and lengthy enough to stand on their own outside of their stage setting.

The drama is set on the Rhône river, in Camargue, south of Arles, in southwestern Provence. To help give the composition Provençal color, Bizet used three existing tunes from a folk/traditional music collection found in the book Lou Tambourin, Istori de l'Estrumen Prouvençau (The Tambourin, Avignon, 1864) by writer and tambourinaire François Vidal:

- № 3: Danso dei Chivau-Frus (Dance of the Frisky Horses)—a brisk tune scored by Bizet for flute, piccolo, and tambourin (a Provençal drum); combined ingeniously with the March of the Kings in the Farandole in act 3 at the climax of the drama.
- № 7: Èr dóu Guet—an "air provençal" heard in the form of a brief berceuse in a mélodrame (No. 13) in act 2.
- № 31: Marcho dei Rèi (March of the Kings)—a Provençal Christmas carol from Avignon celebrating the Epiphany and the Three Kings; also identified as Marche de Turenne, supposedly composed by Jean-Baptiste Lully some 200 years earlier; quoted five times at the beginning of the Overture in different harmonizations and orchestrations; reappears in the form of a chorus in act 3.

The premiere took place on 30 September 1872 in the Théâtre du Vaudeville. Bizet's music is scored for a chorus of 24 singers and an orchestra of only 26 players. Bizet played the harmonium (alternately with his publisher, Antony Choudens, and associate, Ernest Guiraud) backstage at the theater in support of the chorus. Production was rushed as the play was staged as a last-minute replacement for another play (Robert Halt's Madame Frainex), which had been banned by the censors, and the audience was less than favourably disposed to the new play. The premiere was a failure and the production closed after 19 performances. Daudet later bitterly remarked: "It was a resounding flop amid the prettiest music in the world, silk and velvet costumes, and comic opera scenery. I came out of there discouraged, still hearing the silly laughter caused by the emotional scenes." "It was clear from the beginning that a drama of passion from the Camargue would not appeal to the sophisticated tastes of the Paris boulevards."

L'Arlésienne Suite No. 1, Op. 23^{bis} (1872)

Bizet was assured that the best numbers from the incidental music, arranged for a full symphony orchestra, would be successful in the concert hall. He planned a five movement suite as follows: 1. Prélude, 2. Carillon, 3. Adagietto, 4. Minuetto, 5. Final (unidentified number). Later he exchanged the positions of the 2nd and 4th numbers and abandoned the final one, leaving a four movement orchestral suite:

1. Prélude
2. Minuetto
3. Adagietto
4. Carillon

The order of the movements does not correspond precisely with that of the incidental music, but conforms rather to the character and tempo conventions of a short symphony. The Prélude and Adagietto closely resemble their original versions except for their expanded instrumentation. The Adagietto, previously scored for muted string quartet, particularly benefits from its new massed, but muted, string sonority. The main difference in the Minuetto is a six bar addition to its coda. The Carillon, on the other hand, is considerably enlarged by the addition of the andantino that framed the Adagietto, followed by a shortened repeat of the opening section. Thus the movement now has an ABA form. The original title of the new work was L'Arlésienne, Suite d'Orchestre, but after the appearance of a second suite, it would be known as L'Arlésienne, 1^{re} Suite d'Orchestre (L'Arlésienne Suite No. 1). It was first performed on 10 November 1872 under Jules Pasdeloup of the Concerts populaires in the Cirque d'hiver with great success. The Minuetto had to be encored, and the Adagietto was almost accorded the same honor.

L'Arlésienne Suite No. 2 (1879)

L'Arlésienne Suite No. 1 became so popular that the publisher Choudens commissioned a second set, L'Arlésienne, 2^{me} Suite d'Orchestre, in 1879, four years after Bizet's death. His friend Ernest Guiraud is claimed to have arranged the other three large scale movements and, adding an extraneous number (the Minuet), assembled a second four movement suite as follows:

1. Pastorale
2. Intermezzo
3. Minuet
4. Farandole

The choral parts of the Pastorale were arranged for orchestra. This two part movement takes an ABA form, like the Carillon movement, by a repeat of the opening (Andante sostenuto assai) music. The Intermezzo has a 12 measure addition based on the central (Allegro moderato) theme inserted 4 bars before the end. The Minuet was taken from Scènes bohémiennes, a suite of material originally composed for Bizet's 1866 opera La jolie fille de Perth, where it "accompanies the duke's wooing of the false Catherine in Act III". The Farandole (the name of a Provençal dance) is a condensation of two numbers of the incidental music – № 22: Final, and № 23: Entr'acte and Chorus. The choruses in these numbers were either omitted (the former) or arranged for orchestra (the latter). Although the arrangements in L'Arlésienne Suite No. 2 are assumed to be Guiraud's work (his name is not mentioned in any scores) and the composition is clearly not as unified as the first suite, it contains a large proportion of inspired Bizet material, and is therefore generally credited to Bizet. The first performance of L'Arlésienne Suite No. 2 took place on 21 March 1880 when Jules Pasdeloup again led the orchestra of the Concerts populaires.

L'Arlésienne, incidental music (1885/86)

The popularity of Bizet's music for L'Arlésienne was undoubtedly one of the factors prompting a later reappraisal of the original drama, and on 5 May 1885, a revival took place at the Théâtre de l'Odéon in Paris. Although the play was again received coldly initially, the success of this production resulted in a subsequent run of over 400 performances. A new version of the score for full orchestra was used, in which numbers from the suites, now expanded both in content and instrumentation, replaced the original small ensemble orchestrations of the 1872 version. The remaining numbers retained their original orchestrations, and a few numbers were either omitted, duplicated, truncated, or exchanged positions.

=== Performance history ===
L'Arlésienne, incidental music

Personnel	Role	1872 premiere	1885 revival
Production	Director	Léon Carvalho	Paul Porel
Production	Designer	Charles-Antoine Cambon; Philippe Chaperon; Jean-Louis Chéret; Auguste Alfred Rubé	Philippe Chaperon; Marcel Jambon; Alfred Lemeunier; Auguste Alfred Rubé
Production	Conductor	Marc Constantin	Édouard Colonne
Cast	Francet Mamaï	Ernest Cornaglia	Ernest Cornaglia
Cast	Frédéri	Abel	Albert Lambert
Cast	Balthazar	Jean-Auguste Parade	Paul Mounet
Cast	Le Patron Marc	Colson	Sujol
Cast	Mitifio	Régnier	Arthur Rebel
Cast	L'équipage	Pierre Lacroix	Fréville
Cast	Un valet	Moisson	Dalier
Cast	Rose Mamaï	Anaïs Fargueil	Aimée Tessandier
Cast	Renaude	Clémence Alexis	Irma Crosnier
Cast	L'Innocent	Morand	Léonie Yahne
Cast	Vivette	Julia Bartet	Zélie Hadamard
Cast	Une servante	Leroy	Noémie

L'Arlésienne, Suite d'Orchestre

Date	Location	Conductor	Orchestra
1872 November 10	Paris	Jules Pasdeloup	Concerts populaires
1873 November 9	Paris	Édouard Colonne	Concert National
1875 February 21	Paris	Édouard Deldevez	Concerts du Conservatoire
1876 October 6	New York	Theodore Thomas	Theodore Thomas Orchestra

== Instrumentation ==
The score of the original incidental music is notable not only for its light instrumentation (due to the budget constraints of the Théâtre du Vaudeville), but also for its unusual composition—particularly the small number of violas and brass instruments, and the introduction of two instruments new to the orchestra.

Section	Incidental music	Suite No. 1	Suite No. 2
Strings	• 4 violins I • 3 violins II • 1 viola • 5 cellos • 2 double basses	• violins I • violins II • violas • cellos • double basses	• violins I • violins II • violas • cellos • double basses
Woodwinds	• 2 flutes (second doubling piccolo) • 1 oboe (also cor anglais) • 1 clarinet • 2 bassoons • 1 alto saxophone	• 2 flutes • 2 oboes (second doubling cor anglais) • 2 clarinets • 2 bassoons • 1 alto saxophone	• 2 flutes (second doubling piccolo) • 2 oboes (second doubling cor anglais) • 2 clarinets • 2 bassoons • 1 alto saxophone
Brass	2 horns, one natural, one valved	• 4 horns • 2 trumpets • 2 cornets • 3 trombones	• 4 horns • 2 trumpets • 2 cornets • 3 trombones
Percussion	timpani (also tambourin provençal)	• timpani • drum	• timpani • tambourin provençal • bass drum • cymbals
Additional	piano (also harmonium)	harp or piano	harp or piano

The score makes novel use of the saxophone, at this time just being introduced after its invention in the 1840s. Some have associated the instrument with the character l'Innocent. However, only the first of the eight appearances of his theme is scored for the saxophone; the remaining seven are played by strings. Furthermore, the saxophone appears prominently in the entr'acte before act 2, tableau 2, which may be said to be associated with the character Vivette.

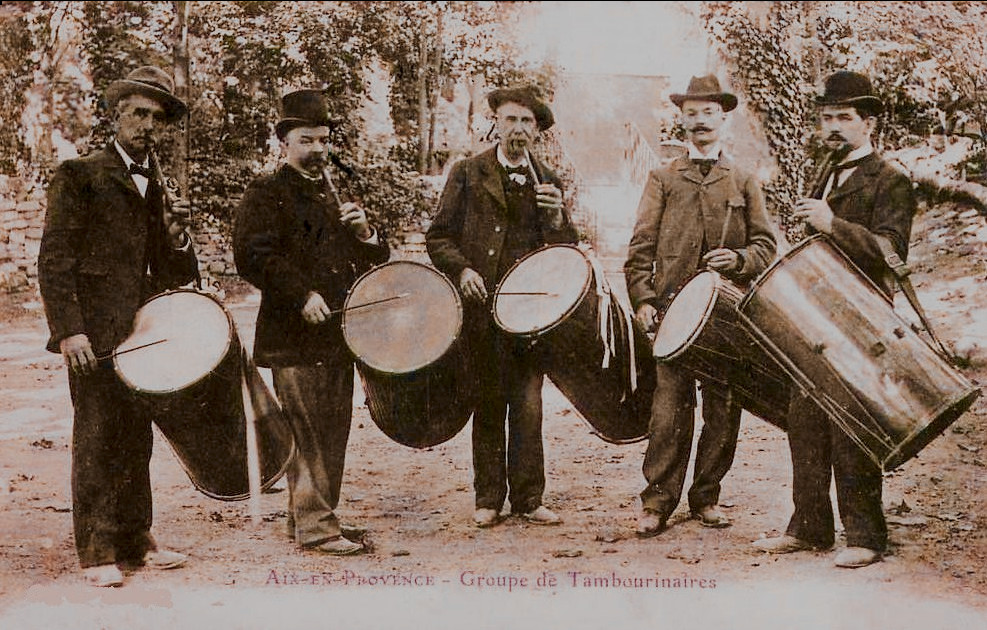
A group of tambourinaires of Aix-en-Provence playing the tambourin (a low-pitched tenor drum) with the right hand, and the galoubet (a pipe) with the left.

The specific drum to use in the percussion section is an issue of some confusion. Both Bizet's incidental music manuscript of 1872 and the score of L'Arlésienne Suite No. 2, arranged by Guiraud in 1879, specify a "tambourin", a large tabor not to be confused with the tambourine. The tambourin provençal is a low-pitched tenor drum, the length of which is typically about twice its diameter. In Provence, the tambourin is usually played in conjunction with the galoubet (a small pipe), making this combination a unique Provençal pipe and tabor. This is the effect Bizet had in mind when he set the tune "Danso dei Chivau-Frus", used in the Farandole to evoke the sound of tambourinaires playing during a festival celebrating Saint Eligius.

In the absence of a genuine tambourin, a tom drum or a snareless side drum is sometimes substituted. This was the circumstance in the premiere production, during which critic Arthur Pougin of Le Soir complained that the tambourin provençal had been replaced by an ordinary drum (tambour). Herbert von Karajan and Leonard Bernstein are two examples of conductors who mistakenly use a tambourine in recordings. The score of the first number of L'Arlésienne Suite No. 1, 'Prélude', specifies merely a "tambour", and although a tambourin de Provence could just as well be employed here also, many orchestras use a snare drum (caisse claire).

== Incidental music (1872) ==
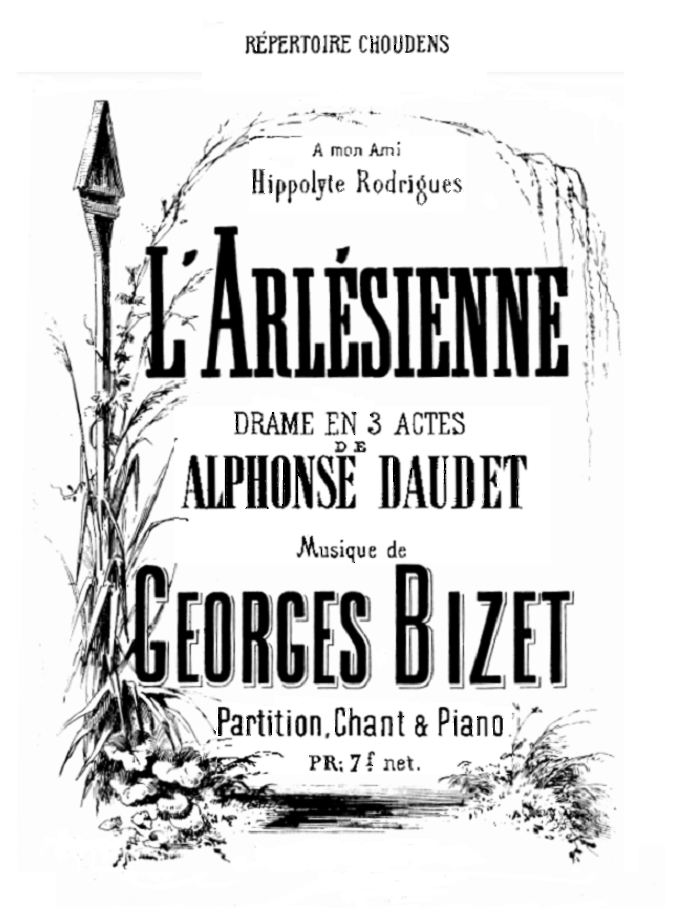
The title page to a vocal score of the incidental music to L'Arlésienne, published by Choudens, Paris (1885).

Setting

The action takes place in Camargue, on the Rhône River, near the Étang de Vaccarès. The time is unspecified. The season in which the story takes place is a point of some confusion. At the beginning of act 1, Balthazar mentions that it is the first of May. In act 3, he mentions that it is now June. This occurs just before the Farandole, during which the peasants are celebrating Saint Éloi (Eligius), patron saint of horses, farriers, and husbandry. However, his feast day does not occur until the first of December.

Main Characters

- Francet Mamaï (65), farmer of le Castelet, grandfather of Frédéri and L'Innocent
- Rose Mamaï (40), a widow, Francet's daughter-in-law, mother of Frédéri and L'Innocent
- Frédéri (20), the protagonist, obsessively in love with the woman from Arles (L'Arlésienne)
- L'Innocent (13), Frédéri's brother Janet; regarded as having a developmental disability
- Balthazar (70), chief shepherd
- La Renaude (70), Balthazar's youthful love, Vivette's grandmother
- Vivette (17), Rose's goddaughter, to whom Frédéri's becomes engaged
- Patron Marc, Rose's brother, a Rhône sailor
- Mitifio (30), a horseherd ("un gardien de chevaux"), lover of the woman from Arles

=== Synopsis ===
The Prélude (No. 1) begins with five different orchestrations of the March of the Kings, and concludes with the first of several quotations in the score of L'Innocent's theme, and Frédéri's theme.

Act 1

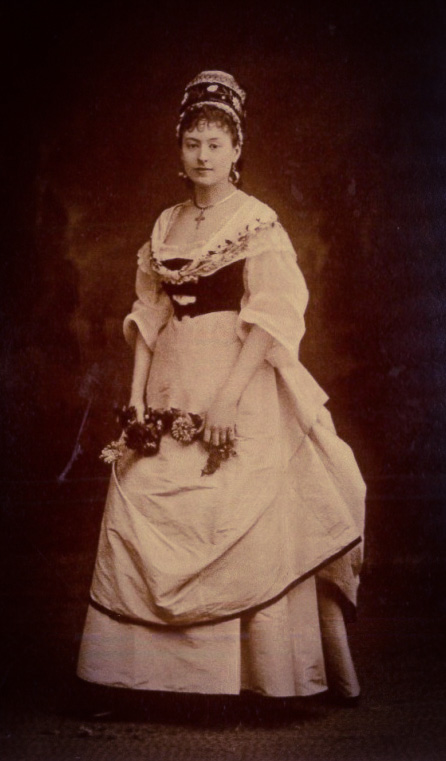
Julia Bartet costumed as Vivette, the first role in her long career (1872–1920). From the Musée Lambinet, Versailles.

Tableau 1: The Farm of Castelet

In Scene 1, Francet Mamaï tells Balthazar of Frédéri's passion for a woman from Arles. L'Innocent, whose theme dominates the first mélodrame (No. 2) and the next two numbers, wants Balthazar to finish his story about Mr. Seguin's goat, who was attacked by a wolf (another short story from Letters from my windmill). Balthazar assures the boy he will continue the story shortly. Francet reports that Frédéri doesn't eat or sleep and is in the grip of a kind of love fever. Francet and Balthazar agree that Frédéri would be better off marrying an industrious local girl, such as Vivette Renaude, rather than a "town hussy". Rose's brother Marc, who lives in Arles, and is due to arrive soon, has been tasked with investigating the Arlésienne and her family to be sure they are respectable.

The next mélodrame (No. 3) links the first scene to the second, in which Balthazar continues telling the goat story to l'Innocent. Vivette enters in Scene 3, and asks Balthazar if l'Innocent can be cured. Balthazar repeats the superstitious belief that an Innocent in the household protects the others from evil and harm. The third mélodrame (No. 4) accompanies the exchange between Vivette and Balthazar, in which the shepherd says he thinks something is stirring in l'Innocent's mind: "That child is waking up... and if he does wake up, everybody about the place must be on their guard." Rose enters in Scene 4, and eventually reports Frédéri's engagement. When l'Innocent climbs high up into the hayloft in the turret, Rose, annoyed, expresses her dread that someone might fall from there onto the flagstones in the courtyard. In Scene 5, Frédéri enters, greets his mother, but takes no notice of Vivette, who is crushed.

Patron Marc enters in Scene 6 with nothing negative to report about the Arlésienne – she and her family are all fine people. He tells Francet he is expected to go to Arles to make a marriage offer. In Scene 8 Balthazar, alone, notes Vivette's grief – she loves Frédéri secretly and suffers in silence, just like her grandmother did. A mélodrame (No. 5), with offstage chorus 'Grand soleil de la Provence', also introduces the theme of the gardian Mitifio, whom Balthazar notices skulking about. Mitifio reveals to Francet that the Arlésienne has been his mistress for two years, and he means to keep her. He has letters from the Arlésienne confirming his story; Francet asks to borrow them. In the final mélodrame (No. 6), Frédéri is about to go off to Arles, but Francet shows him Mitifio's letters. The chorus bursts in with a reprise of 'Grand soleil de la Provence', and Frédéri's theme accompanies his collapse by the well.

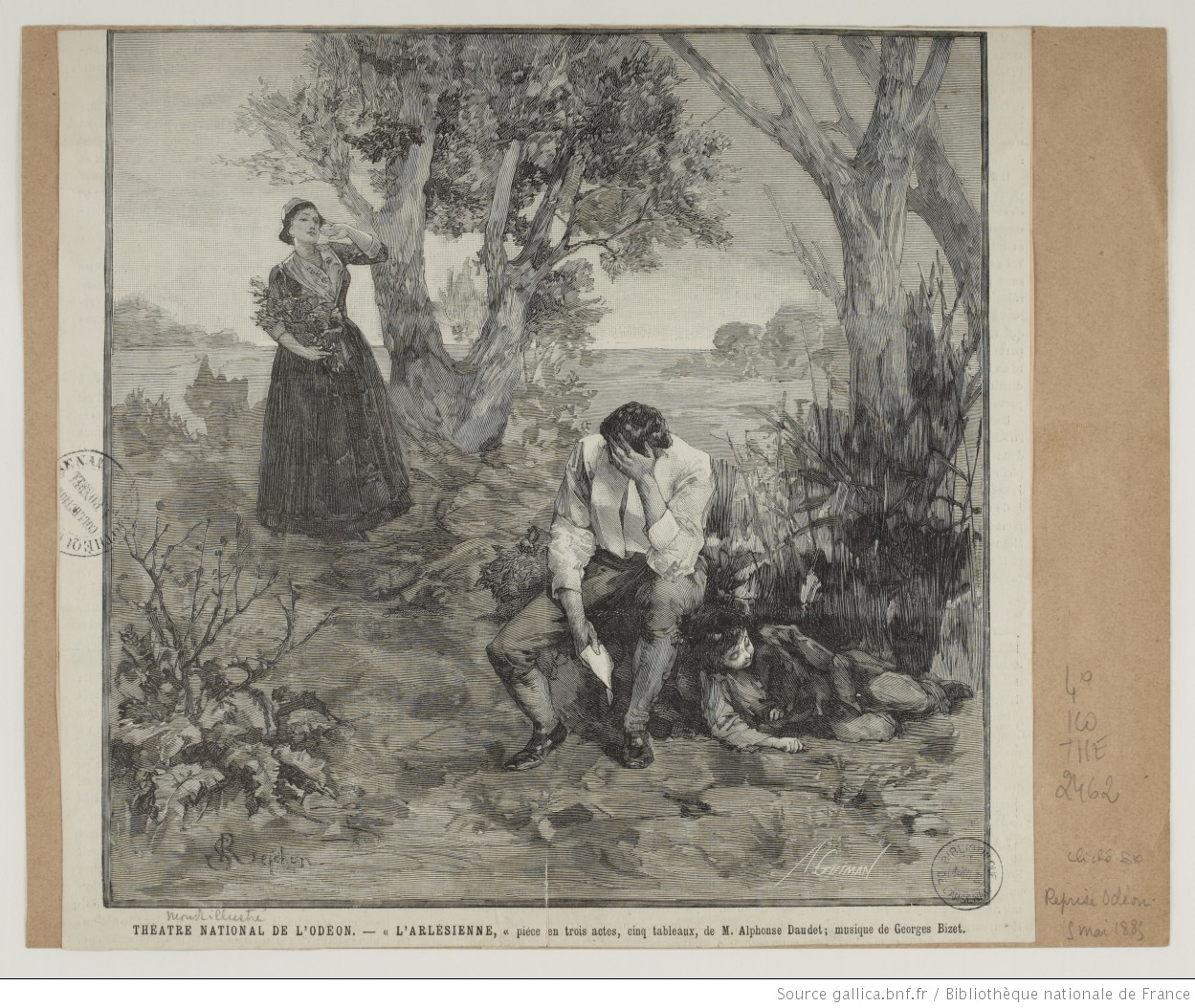
An illustration in the Bibliothèque nationale de France for the revival of L'Arlésienne at the Théâtre de l'Odéon in 1885. Vivette, Frédéri, and l'Innocent are shown in act 2, tableau 1, scene 6, just after Mélodrame № 13.

Act 2

Tableau 1: The Shore of the Étang de Vaccarès in Camargue

An entr'acte (No. 7: 'Pastorale', with wordless offstage chorus 'La la-la-la-la-la'), later appearing as the first movement in the Suite No. 2, sets the scene. In the following Mélodrame (№ 8) Balthazar and l'Innocent enter with "agitated modulations" in the latter's theme, and the next (№ 9) marks the exit of Rose. The mélodrame № 10 accompanies the discovery of Fréderi in the shepherd's hut, angry because everyone is spying on him. A wordless offstage chorus sing (№ 11: the shepherds's call), Balthazar leaves, having failed to make Frédéri destroy the letters from the Arlésienne which he reads night and day. The following mélodrame (№ 12) is only six bars; l'Innocent cannot recall the story he wants to tell his brother. In the next mélodrame (№ 13, Èr dóu Guet) described as a berceuse, l'Innocent falls asleep while telling his story. The final mélodrame (№ 14: reprise of 'La la-la-la-la-la' chorus) evokes Rose's desperation at Fréderi's frame of mind.

Tableau 2: The Kitchen at Castelet

An entr'acte (No. 15: the 'Intermezzo' used in the Suite No. 2) depicts Vivette, the local girl who wants to marry Frédéri, preparing her parcels to take on the Rhône ferry. After men prepare to go out shooting game, Rose and the others fear that Frédéri might kill himself. At the end of the act (№ 16: Final) when Frédéri decides that Vivette can help him forget his obsession, Balthazar and Rose express their relief.

Intermezzo

The Valse-Menuet (the 'Minuetto', No. 17) is performed between acts 2 and 3.

Act 3

Tableau 1: The Castelet Farm Courtyard

An entr'acte (No. 18: 'Carillon') introduces the first scene of act 3. In the first mélodrame (№ 19) in Scene 3, a 6/8 Andantino marks the entrance of Mère Renaude, and in the following Adagio (the 'Adagietto' of Suite No. 1) Balthazar and Renaude reminisce about their youthful unrequited love. As all move off to eat, there is a reprise of the Andantino. Another Andantino follows the exit of Frédéri and Vivette as they declare their love (№ 21). The farandole (№ 22, Danso dei Chivau-Frus), which begins quietly and builds to a climax, sees Frédéri respond with fury to Mitifio, who has come to recover his letters. Mitifio tells Balthazar that he will run off with the woman from Arles.

Tableau 2: The Magnanery

A brief statement of the 'Dance of the Frisky Horses' theme is heard, then the March of the Kings is sung by the chorus, after which the two are combined (No. 23: 'Early in the morning'). Next, there is a brief reprise for chorus of the March of the Kings (№ 24: 'On a golden chariot'). In № 25, l'Innocent 'awakens' showing he understands his brother's problem. In a mélodrame (№ 26) Rose is momentarily reassured as the clock strikes three, although when she has left Frédéri enters to his theme now "a chromatic scale on a pedal bass". After he has leapt from the hayloft to his death on the courtyard pavement, the orchestra plays a powerful tutti version of his theme (№ 27: Final) which brings down the curtain.

=== Structure ===
Act	No.	Title	Bars	Notes	Suites
Prélude	1	Prélude	144	• Marcho dei Rèi (5 times) • L'Innocent's theme • Frédéri's theme	Suite 1, № 1 'Prélude'
Acte 1 La ferme de Castelet	2	Mélodrame	7	L'Innocent's theme	
Acte 1 La ferme de Castelet	3	Mélodrame	11	L'Innocent's theme	
Acte 1 La ferme de Castelet	4	Mélodrame	10	L'Innocent's theme	
Acte 1 La ferme de Castelet	5	Chœur et Mélodrame	34	• Chorus: 'Grand soleil de la Provence' • Mitifio's theme	
Acte 1 La ferme de Castelet	6	Mélodrame et Chœur final	31	• Mitifio's theme • Chorus: 'Grand soleil de la Provence' • Frédéri's theme	
Entr'acte	7	Entr'acte et chœur: Pastorale	108	• Entr'acte (orchestral) • Chorus: 'La la-la-la-la-la'	Suite 2, № 1 'Pastorale'
Acte 2, tableau 1 Les bords de l'Étang de Vaccarès en Camargue	8	Mélodrame	9	L'Innocent's theme	
Acte 2, tableau 1 Les bords de l'Étang de Vaccarès en Camargue	9	Mélodrame	14	L'Innocent's theme	
Acte 2, tableau 1 Les bords de l'Étang de Vaccarès en Camargue	10	Mélodrame	10	Frédéri's theme	
Acte 2, tableau 1 Les bords de l'Étang de Vaccarès en Camargue	11	Chœur	10	Chorus: The shepherds' call	
Acte 2, tableau 1 Les bords de l'Étang de Vaccarès en Camargue	12	Mélodrame	6	Frédéri's theme	
Acte 2, tableau 1 Les bords de l'Étang de Vaccarès en Camargue	13	Mélodrame	18	Air provençal: Èr dóu Guet ( l'Innocent's lullaby)	
Acte 2, tableau 1 Les bords de l'Étang de Vaccarès en Camargue	14	Mélodrame et Chœur	35	Chorus: 'La la-la-la-la-la'	
Entr'acte	15	Entr'acte	53	• Maestoso • Vivette's theme • Maestoso	Suite 2, № 2 'Intermezzo'
Acte 2, tableau 2 La cuisine de Castelet	16	Final	14	Vivette's theme	Suite 2, № 2 'Intermezzo'
Entr'acte	17	Valse-Menuet	156	Minuetto	Suite 1, № 2 'Minuetto'
Entr'acte	18	Carillon	55	Carillon (short: no andantino, no repeat)	Suite 1, № 4 'Carillon'
Acte 3, tableau 1 La cour du Castelet	19	Mélodrame	99	• Mère Renaud's theme (andantino) • Adagietto • Mère Renaud's theme (andantino)	Suite 1, № 3 'Adagietto'
Acte 3, tableau 1 La cour du Castelet	20	[Reprise de l'Intermezzo]	48	Minuetto (reprise)	
Acte 3, tableau 1 La cour du Castelet	21	Mélodrame	11	Vivette's theme	
Acte 3, tableau 1 La cour du Castelet	22	Final	108	Danso dei Chivau-Frus (with chorus: 'Le flutet de Marie')	Suite 2, № 4 'Farandole'
Entr'acte	23	Entr'acte et Chœur	127	• Frédéri's theme • L'Innocent's theme • Danso dei Chivau-Frus • Marcho dei Rèi (chorus: 'De bon matin') • Danso dei Chivau-Frus + Marcho dei Rèi (chorus)	Suite 2, № 4 'Farandole'
Acte 3, tableau 2 La magnanerie	24	Chœur	8	Marcho dei Rèi (chorus: 'Sur un char doré')	
Acte 3, tableau 2 La magnanerie	25	Mélodrame	31	L'Innocent's theme (l'Innocent's awakening)	
Acte 3, tableau 2 La magnanerie	26	Mélodrame	24	Frédéri's theme	
Acte 3, tableau 2 La magnanerie	27	Final	7	Frédéri's theme	

Note:

- The number '№ 5' does not appear in the original sequence, perhaps indicating the removal of some material. Most of the pieces following this one have therefore been renumbered in blue or red.
- The Valse-Menuet and Carillon were originally together designated № 17: Entr'acte A and B. The Valse-Menuet was later designated 'Intermezzo (Minuetto)' in the 1885 piano-vocal score, published 10 years after Bizet's death.
- № 20 is reported by musicologist Hugh Macdonald to have been a 'Reprise de l'Intermezzo' (i.e., of № 17: Valse-Menuet). This reprise is not present in the composer's manuscript.
Structure of the 1885 revival version

Source: Piano vocal score, Choudens, Paris (ca. 1885)

Act	No.	Title	Bars	Tempo	Bars	Prominent Instruments	Themes	Suites
Overture	1	Ouverture	148	Allegro deciso—Tempo di Marcia	17	Strings	Marcho dei Rèi	Suite 1, № 1 'Prélude'
Overture	1	Ouverture	148	Allegro deciso—Tempo di Marcia	17	Woodwinds	Marcho dei Rèi	Suite 1, № 1 'Prélude'
Overture	1	Ouverture	148	Allegro deciso—Tempo di Marcia	17	Drum, orchestra	Marcho dei Rèi	Suite 1, № 1 'Prélude'
Overture	1	Ouverture	148	Andantino	17	Bassoons, horns, cellos	Marcho dei Rèi	Suite 1, № 1 'Prélude'
Overture	1	Ouverture	148	Allegro deciso—Tempo di Marcia	25	Orchestra	Marcho dei Rèi	Suite 1, № 1 'Prélude'
Overture	1	Ouverture	148	Andante	23	Saxophone, clarinet, orchestra	L'Innocent's theme	Suite 1, № 1 'Prélude'
Overture	1	Ouverture	148	Un peu moins lent	32	Violins, orchestra	Frédéri's theme	Suite 1, № 1 'Prélude'
Acte 1 Le Castelet	2	Mélodrame	7	Andante	7	Muted string quartet, flutes	L'Innocent's theme	
Acte 1 Le Castelet	3	Mélodrame	11	Andante	11	Some strings, woodwinds	L'Innocent's theme	
Acte 1 Le Castelet	4	Mélodrame	10	Andantino sostenuto	10	Flutes, cor anglais, viola, cello	L'Innocent's theme	
Acte 1 Le Castelet	5	Chœur et Mélodrame	35	Allegro moderato	20	Chorus, piano, harmonium	Grand soleil de la Provence	
Acte 1 Le Castelet	5	Chœur et Mélodrame	35	Largo	15	Saxophone, horn, piano, cellos, basses	Mitifio's theme	
Acte 1 Le Castelet	6	Mélodrame et Chœur final	31	Largo	5	Flute, viola, cellos, basses	Mitifio's theme	
Acte 1 Le Castelet	6	Mélodrame et Chœur final	31	Allegro	10	Flute, clarinet, cellos, timpani	Grand soleil de la Provence	
Acte 1 Le Castelet	6	Mélodrame et Chœur final	31	Allegro deciso	8	Chorus, piano, harmonium	Grand soleil de la Provence	
Acte 1 Le Castelet	6	Mélodrame et Chœur final	31	Plus lent	8	Orchestra	Frédéri's theme	
Acte 2, tableau 1 L'Étang de Vaccarès	7	Entr'acte et Chœur: Pastorale	108	Andante sostenuto assai	44	Orchestra	Pastorale	Suite 2, № 1 'Pastorale'
Acte 2, tableau 1 L'Étang de Vaccarès	7	Entr'acte et Chœur: Pastorale	108	Andantino quasi allegretto	64	Chorus, piccolo	La la-la-la-la-la	Suite 2, № 1 'Pastorale'
Acte 2, tableau 1 L'Étang de Vaccarès	8	Mélodrame	9	Andantino	9	4 violins, 2 cellos	L'Innocent's theme	
Acte 2, tableau 1 L'Étang de Vaccarès	9	Mélodrame	14	Allegretto	14	Orchestra	L'Innocent's theme	
Acte 2, tableau 1 L'Étang de Vaccarès	10	Mélodrame	9	Andante	9	String quartet	Frédéri's theme	
Acte 2, tableau 1 L'Étang de Vaccarès	11	Chœur	10	Adagio	10	Chorus, harmonium	The shepherd's call	
Acte 2, tableau 1 L'Étang de Vaccarès	12	Mélodrame	6	Andante	6	String quartet, timpani	Frédéri's theme	
Acte 2, tableau 1 L'Étang de Vaccarès	13	Mélodrame	18	Andante assai	18	Muted string quartet	Èr dóu Guet ("Air provençal")	
Acte 2, tableau 1 L'Étang de Vaccarès	14	Mélodrame	9	Allegro	9	Chorus, orchestra		
Acte 2, tableau 2 La cuisine de Castelet	15	Entr'acte	53	Maestoso	15	Orchestra	Maestoso	Suite 2, № 2 'Intermezzo'
Acte 2, tableau 2 La cuisine de Castelet	15	Entr'acte	53	Allegro moderato	30	Clarinet, saxophone, orchestra	Vivette's theme	Suite 2, № 2 'Intermezzo'
Acte 2, tableau 2 La cuisine de Castelet	15	Entr'acte	53	Maestoso	6	Orchestra	Maestoso	Suite 2, № 2 'Intermezzo'
Acte 2, tableau 2 La cuisine de Castelet	15	Entr'acte	53	Beaucoup plus lent	2	Orchestra	Maestoso	Suite 2, № 2 'Intermezzo'
Acte 2, tableau 2 La cuisine de Castelet	16	Final	14	Quasi-andante	14	Orchestra	Vivette's theme	
Intermezzo	17	Valse-Menuet	162	Allegro giocoso	162	Orchestra	Valse-Menuet	Suite 1, № 2 'Minuetto'
Acte 3, tableau 1 La cour du Castelet	18	Entr'acte: Carillon	148	Allegretto moderato	60	Horns, orchestra	Carillon	Suite 1, № 4 'Carillon'
Acte 3, tableau 1 La cour du Castelet	18	Entr'acte: Carillon	148	Andantino	45	Woodwinds, orchestra	Mère Renaud's theme	Suite 1, № 4 'Carillon'
Acte 3, tableau 1 La cour du Castelet	18	Entr'acte: Carillon	148	Allegretto moderato	43	Horns, orchestra	Carillon	Suite 1, № 4 'Carillon'
Acte 3, tableau 1 La cour du Castelet	19	Mélodrame	99	Andantino	43	2 flutes, 2 violins, viola	Mère Renaud's theme	
Acte 3, tableau 1 La cour du Castelet	19	Mélodrame	99	Adagio	34	Violins, violas, cellos	Adagietto	Suite 1, № 3 'Adagietto'
Acte 3, tableau 1 La cour du Castelet	19	Mélodrame	99	Andantino	22	2 flutes, 2 violins, viola	Mère Renaud's theme	
Acte 3, tableau 1 La cour du Castelet	20	Mélodrame	11	Andantino espressivo	11	Clarinet, piano, strings	Vivette's theme	
Acte 3, tableau 1 La cour du Castelet	21	Farandole	68	Allegro vivo e deciso	68	Flute, piccolo, tambourin, orchestra	Danso dei Chivau-Frus	Suite 2, № 4 'Farandole'
Acte 3, tableau 2 La Magnanerie	22	Entr'acte	34	Adagio	34	Orchestra	Adagietto	
Acte 3, tableau 2 La Magnanerie	23	Chœur	78	Allegretto giocoso	24	Flute, piccolo, tambourin, orchestra	Danso dei Chivau-Frus	Suite 2, № 4 'Farandole'
Acte 3, tableau 2 La Magnanerie	23	Chœur	78	Tempo di marcia molto moderato	33	Chorus	Marcho dei Rèi	Suite 2, № 4 'Farandole'
Acte 3, tableau 2 La Magnanerie	23	Chœur	78	Allegretto giocoso	21	Flute, piccolo, tambourin, orchestra	Danso dei Chivau-Frus; Marcho dei Rèi	Suite 2, № 4 'Farandole'
Acte 3, tableau 2 La Magnanerie	24	Chœur	9	Large	9	Chorus	Marcho dei Rèi	
Acte 3, tableau 2 La Magnanerie	25	Mélodrame	31	Andante assai	31	Orchestra	L'Innocent's theme	
Acte 3, tableau 2 La Magnanerie	26	Mélodrame	24	Adagio	24	Orchestra	Frédéri's theme	
Acte 3, tableau 2 La Magnanerie	27	Final	7	Large	7	Orchestra	Frédéri's theme	

== Suite No. 1 (1872) ==
=== I. Prélude ===
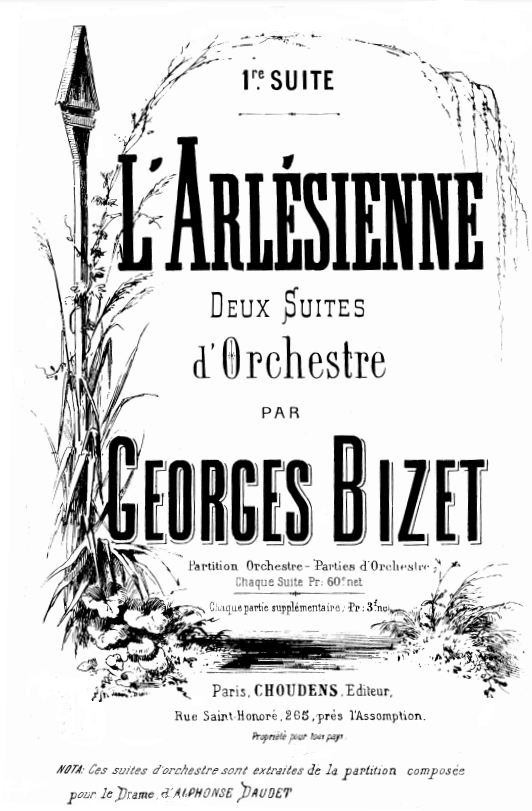
Title page to the score of the first suite from L'Arlésienne, published by Choudens, Paris (after 1879).

The suite opens with a strong, energetic theme in C minor, which is based on the Epiphany carol "March of the Kings", played by the violins. Afterwards, the theme is repeated by various sections. After reaching a climax, the theme fades away. It is followed by the F minor theme associated with L'Innocent (the younger brother of Frédéri). The Prélude concludes with the A minor theme associated with Frédéri himself.

=== II. Minuetto ===
The second movement resembles a minuet in C minor. The ending of this movement is slightly expanded from the version in the incidental music.

=== III. Adagietto ===
The Adagietto is taken from the central Adagio portion of the first number in act 3, no. 19: Mélodrame. The suite version does not include the Andantino that precedes and follows the incidental music version. At only 34 measures, the Adagietto is the shortest number in the score of either suite, but because of its slow tempo, it can last more than 3 minutes, a longer performance duration than that of the Minuetto's 162 measures. It is written in F major, 3/4 meter throughout. The incidental music version is scored for muted string quartet. The scoring of the suite version is expanded to the entire string section (minus the basses), still muted.

=== IV. Carillon ===
The last movement is based on no. 18: 'Carillon' from the entr'acte preceding act 3, augmented with the Andantino from the following number, № 19: Mélodrame. A shortened version of the Carillon returns after the Andantino to round off the movement in ABA form.

The Carillon portions of the music are written in E major, 3/4 meter, Allegretto moderato tempo, and feature an ostinato bell-tone pattern (G♯, E, F♯) on the horns, perhaps suggesting tolling church bells, throughout. The main melody of the Carillon theme is scored for strings (and later the flutes); the other instruments for the most part play bell tones in support of the horns.

The Andantino is marked 'Entrée de la Mère Renaud' ('Entrance of Mère Renaud') in the 1885 piano vocal score of the incidental music. It is sometimes designated a siciliana or pastorale on account of its minor key, 6/8 meter, and dotted rhythms. Originally written in C minor, it is here transposed up a semitone to C♯ minor, the relative minor of E major, to facilitate the transition back to the Carillon theme. The main Andantino theme is initially played by the flutes, which are then joined by the oboes, and finally the saxophone. The horns then begin to insinuate themselves, quietly playing the bell theme again, in a skillful transition blending the A and B themes. The reprise of the Carillon theme follows, played first by the oboes before returning to the strings.

== Suite No. 2 (1879) ==
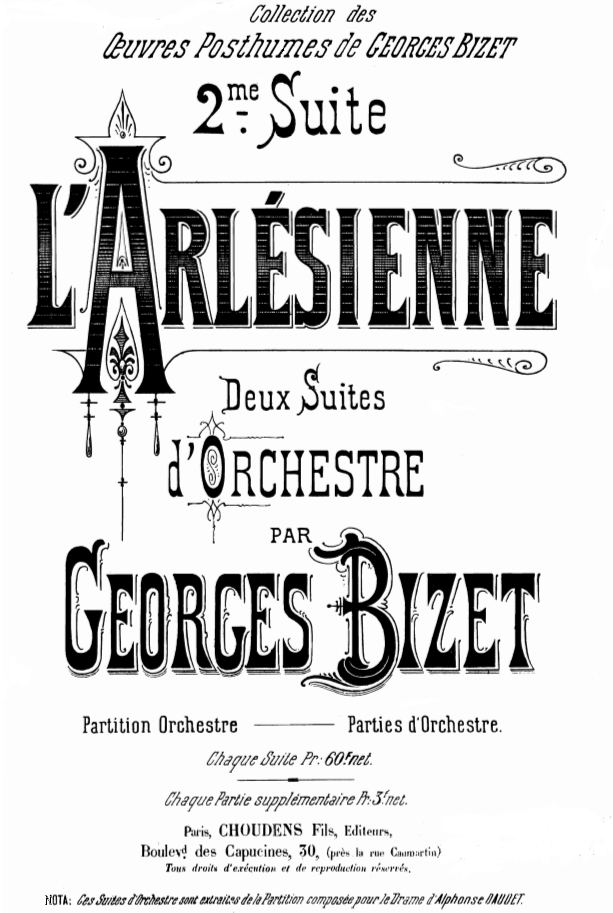
The title page to the score of the second suite from L'Arlésienne, published by Choudens, Paris (1879).

=== I. Pastorale ===
The Pastorale (in A major) begins with an introduction by the wind section, followed by the melody in the strings. The melodies are repeated by various sections throughout the first movement. In the suite, the opening section returns and concludes the piece. In the original version, the "central" section, which was a wordless chorus sung by women, ends the piece.

=== II. Intermezzo ===
The Intermezzo in E-Flat major features utilization of low tones and begins with the wind section. Guiraud adds twelve additional bars to the concluding section. Sometime after this second suite was prepared from the L'Arlésienne music, Guiraud extracted the Intermezzo movement, added the Latin sacred text of the Agnus Dei to it, and published it as yet another "new" work of Bizet.

=== III. Menuet ===
The menuet in E-Flat major, which is not from L'Arlésienne, but from Bizet's 1866 opera The Fair Maid of Perth, features solos by harp, flute, and, later, saxophone (this replacing the vocal parts of the original).

=== IV. Farandole ===
The finale, the farandole, incorporates the theme of the March of the Kings once again, this time in D minor. This is an expanded combination of numbers 21 and 23–24 of the original incidental music, in which the farandole (in D major) appears first on its own. It is afterwards briefly combined with the march.

== Recordings ==
=== Audio ===
Incidental Music

Year	Conductor	Orchestra and Choir	Notes	Label
1957	Albert Wolff	Unidentified studio orchestra and choir	Dramatization by Max de Rieux with actors Mary Marquet, Berthe Bovy, Maurice Chambreuil, Pierre Larquey, Hubert Noël, Bernadette Lange, Robert Vidalin, Jacques Bernard, and Fernand Sardou	Decca LXT5229-30; Naxos 9.80151-52
1985	Michel Plasson	Orchestre du Capitole de Toulouse; Orfeon Donostiarra	Complete incidental music	EMI 47460
1986	John Eliot Gardiner	Orchestre de l'Opera de Lyon	Orchestral excerpts (10 numbers)	Erato 45298
1991	Robert Haydon Clark	Consort of London; Consort of Voices	Complete incidental music	Collins Classics 11412
1991	Christopher Hogwood	Saint Paul Chamber Orchestra	Six orchestral excerpts edited by Hogwood	Decca (recorded November 1989)
1992	Alexander Rahbari	BRTN Philharmonic Orchestra Brussels	Complete incidental music	Koch Discover International DICD 920115
1996	Helmuth Froschauer	Kölner Rundfunkorchester; Kölner Rundfunkchor	Complete incidental music in a German language concert adaptation with narrators by Christoph Schwandt	Capriccio 10815
2004	Jean-Claude Malgoire	Orchestre de Chambre National de Toulouse; Ensemble Vocal Jean Sourisse	Complete incidental music; with narrator Daniel Mesguich	Auvidis Valois
2004	Christopher Hogwood	Kammerorchester Basel	Excerpts (9 numbers)	Arte Nova

Suites

Year	Conductor	Orchestra	Notes	Label
1939	Thomas Beecham	London Philharmonic Orchestra	Five movements	Columbia
1952	Leopold Stokowski	Stokowski Symphony Orchestra	Suites 1 & 2	RCA Victor
1952	André Cluytens	Orchestre National de la Radiodiffusion Française	Suites 1 & 2	EMI
1957	Thomas Beecham	Royal Philharmonic Orchestra	Suites 1 & 2	EMI 67259
1958	Herbert von Karajan	Philharmonia Orchestra	Suites 1 & 2	EMI
1966	George Szell	Cleveland Orchestra	Suites 1 & Farandole from second suite	Columbia
1967	Charles Munch	New Philharmonia Orchestra	Suites 1 & Farandole from second suite	Decca
1972	Leonard Bernstein	New York Philharmonic Orchestra	Suites 1 & 2	Columbia
1979	Neville Marriner	Academy of St Martin in the Fields	Suites 1 & 2	EMI
1981	Claudio Abbado	London Symphony Orchestra	Suites 1 & 2	Deutsche Grammophon
1985	Herbert von Karajan	Berlin Philharmonic Orchestra	Suites 1 & 2	Deutsche Grammophon
1988	Charles Dutoit	Montreal Symphony Orchestra	Suites 1 & 2	Decca
2008	Marc Minkowski	Les Musiciens du Louvre; Chœur de l'opéra national de Lyon	Suites 1 & 2 and eight items from the incidental music	Naïve

=== Video ===
Films and television adaptations that use Bizet's music

Year	Title	Director	Cast	Notes
1930	L'Arlésienne	Jacques de Baroncelli	Jim Gérald (Marc), Germaine Dermoz (Rose), Blanche Montel (Vivette), José Noguéro (Frédéri), Charles Vanel (Mitifio), Maurice Schutz (Balthazar), Jean Mercanton (l'Innocent)	Produced by Pathé-Natan
1942	L'Arlésienne	Marc Allégret	Raimu (Marc), Gaby Morlay (Rose), Gisèle Pascal (Vivette), Louis Jourdan (Frédéri), Fernand Charpin (Francet), Édouard Delmont (Balthazar), Charles Moulin (Mitifio), Roland Pégurier (l'Innocent), Annie Toinon (Renaude), Marcel Maupi (l'équipage)	Paul Paray conducted Bizet's score.
1967	L'Arlésienne	Pierre Badel	Henri Nassiet (Francet), Louise Conte (Rose), Paul Barge (Frédéri), Charles Vanel (Balthazar), Francine Ollivier (Vivette), Pierre Hatet (Mitifio), Gérard Lecaillon (l'Innocent), Berthe Bovy (Renaude).	Telefilm broadcast by the ORTF

== Notable uses ==
Music from the L'Arlésienne suites was played extensively in "Hammer into Anvil", an episode of The Prisoner.

The "Carillon" and "Farandole" featured in the Playhouse Disney's/Disney Junior series Little Einsteins in the episodes Go West, Young Train and Annie's Solo Mission.

The "Carillon" was used in a very successful media campaign in Puerto Rico, launched in the late 1980s by the local importers of Finlandia vodka. It featured French-born photographer Guy Paizy playing the role of a sophisticated, womanizing classical orchestra conductor. The campaign is still remembered in the island nation, almost two decades after its inception.

Albanian dictator Enver Hoxha adopted the First Suite's "Prelude" as a military march during his reign.

The Japanese group Mihimaru GT uses the theme of the "Farandole" for their song "Theme of mihimaLIVE 2".

American songwriter, composer, and arranger Ben Homer created a jazz arrangement "Bizet Has His Day" from Georges Bizet's "Farandole" from L'Arlésienne, (1945).

Jazz musician Bob James arranged and recorded a jazz version of "Farandole" on his album Two (1975).

French choreographer Roland Petit created a ballet L'Arlésienne in 1974 which has been performed throughout the world, based on Daudet's short story and set against a Van Gogh landscape.

A rock version of "Farandole" appears in the Catherine video game by Atlus.

The song tune is also used in a character song called "England's Evil Summoning Song" from an anime called Hetalia: Axis Powers and was performed by Noriaki Sugiyama, who provided vocals for Arthur Kirkland/England.
