= Tableaux de Provence =

Alto saxophone suite by Paule Maurice

Tableaux de Provence ("Pictures of Provence") is a programmatic suite composed by Paule Maurice (Sept. 29, 1910 – August 18, 1967) between 1948 and 1955 for alto saxophone and orchestra, most often performed with piano accompaniment only. The work was dedicated to French saxophone virtuoso, Marcel Mule. The movements describe the culture and scenery of Provence, southeast France, where the Mules, Paule Maurice, and her husband, composer Pierre Lantier, spent vacation time together. Tableaux de Provence was first recorded by Marcel Mule in 1957 on the Selmer release Marcel Mule, with Solange Robin on piano. It was premiered on December 9, 1958 by Jean-Marie Londeix with the Orchestre Symphonique Brestois.

Tableaux de Provence has five movements:

1. Farandoulo di chatouno / Farandole des jeunes filles (Farandole of the young girls)
2. Cansoun per ma mio / Chanson pour ma mie (Song for my love)
3. La boumiano / La bohémienne (The Bohemian woman, or The Gypsy)
4. Dis alyscamps l'amo souspire / Des alyscamps l'âme soupire (A Sigh on the soul for the Alyscamps)
5. Lou cabridan / Le cabridan (The Southern Hornet)

The fourth movement, Dis alyscamps l'amo souspire, is said to have been written first, as Maurice was mourning the death of her husband’s cousin.
