= Girls Dancing Around an Obelisk =

Painting by Hubert Robert

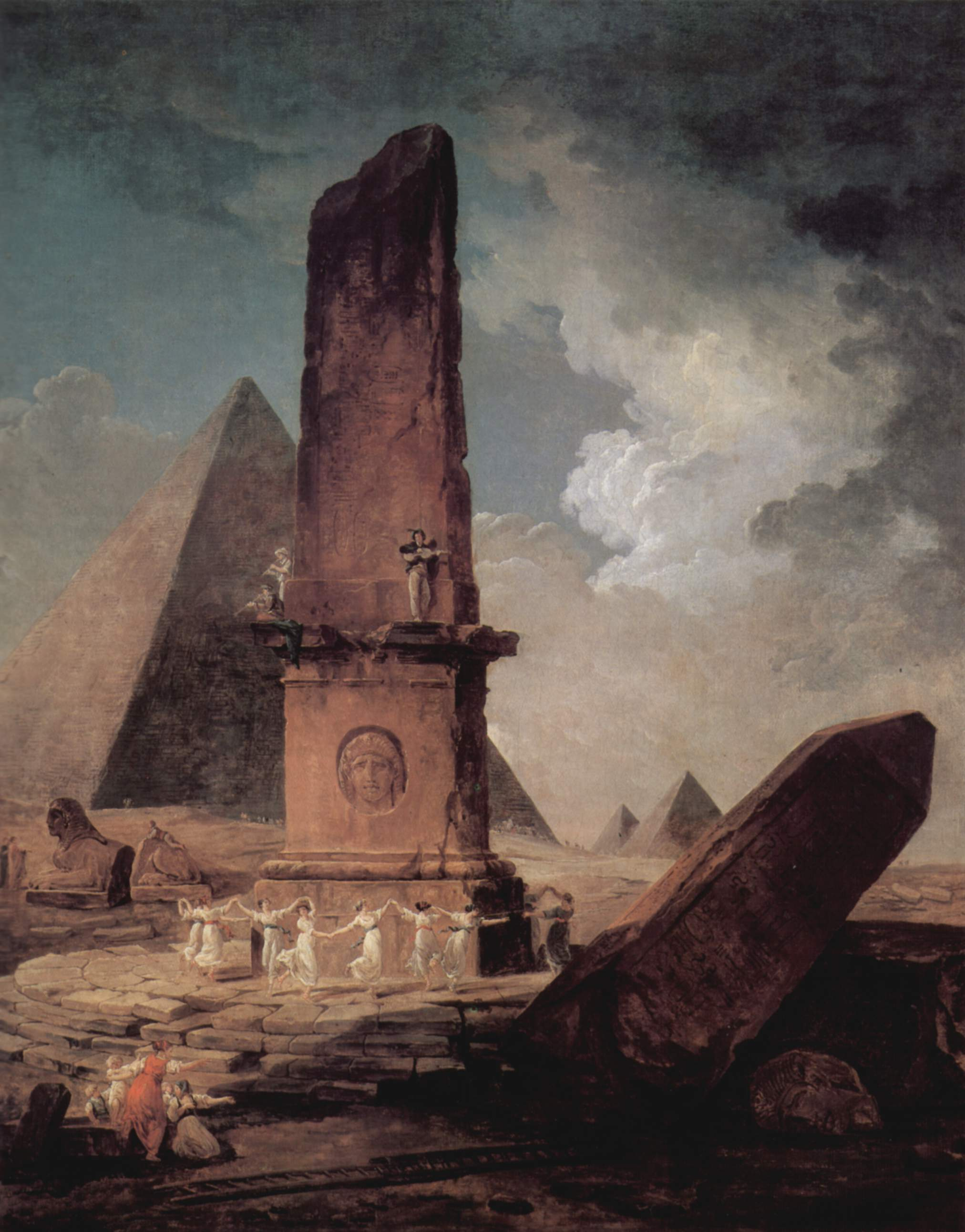
- Artist: Hubert Robert
- Year: 1798
- Medium: Oil on canvas
- Dimensions: 119.7 cm × 99 cm (47.1 in × 39 in)
- Location: Montreal Museum of Fine Arts, Montreal

Girls Dancing Around an Obelisk is an oil-on-canvas painting by French painter Hubert Robert, made in 1798. The work has been held at the Montreal Museum of Fine Arts since 1964.

== History and description ==
Robert often depicted scenes with ancient Egyptian and classical architecture, which was a common thematic subject of Romanticism. Despite the painting's setting, Robert had never visited Egypt, and likely based the work on studies of ancient Egyptian monuments in Rome.

The main subject of the painting are nine female figures who are performing the farandole dance around the base of an obelisk. The scene also includes figures perched on the obelisk's plinth, playing musical instruments. The figures in the painting are dressed in the 18th-century fashion of the artist's time. The obelisk and its surroundings, which includes a statue of a sphinx, are shown in ruins.

While the setting of the painting is imaginary, it appears to incorporate the Giza pyramid complex in the background. There is a large visual contrast between the scale of the figures and that of the monuments.

== Interpretation ==
Some have interpreted the nine dancing figures in the work as a reference to the Masonic Lodge of the Nine Sisters, a prominent French fraternity whose members included Voltaire and Benjamin Franklin. The Lodge, whose name was based on the nine Muses of antiquity, was purported to have been frequented by Robert.

The work is also thought to have been inspired by the events leading up to the French campaign in Egypt and Syria, which was undertaken by Napoleon in 1798.
