= Farandole =

Community dance of Provence, France

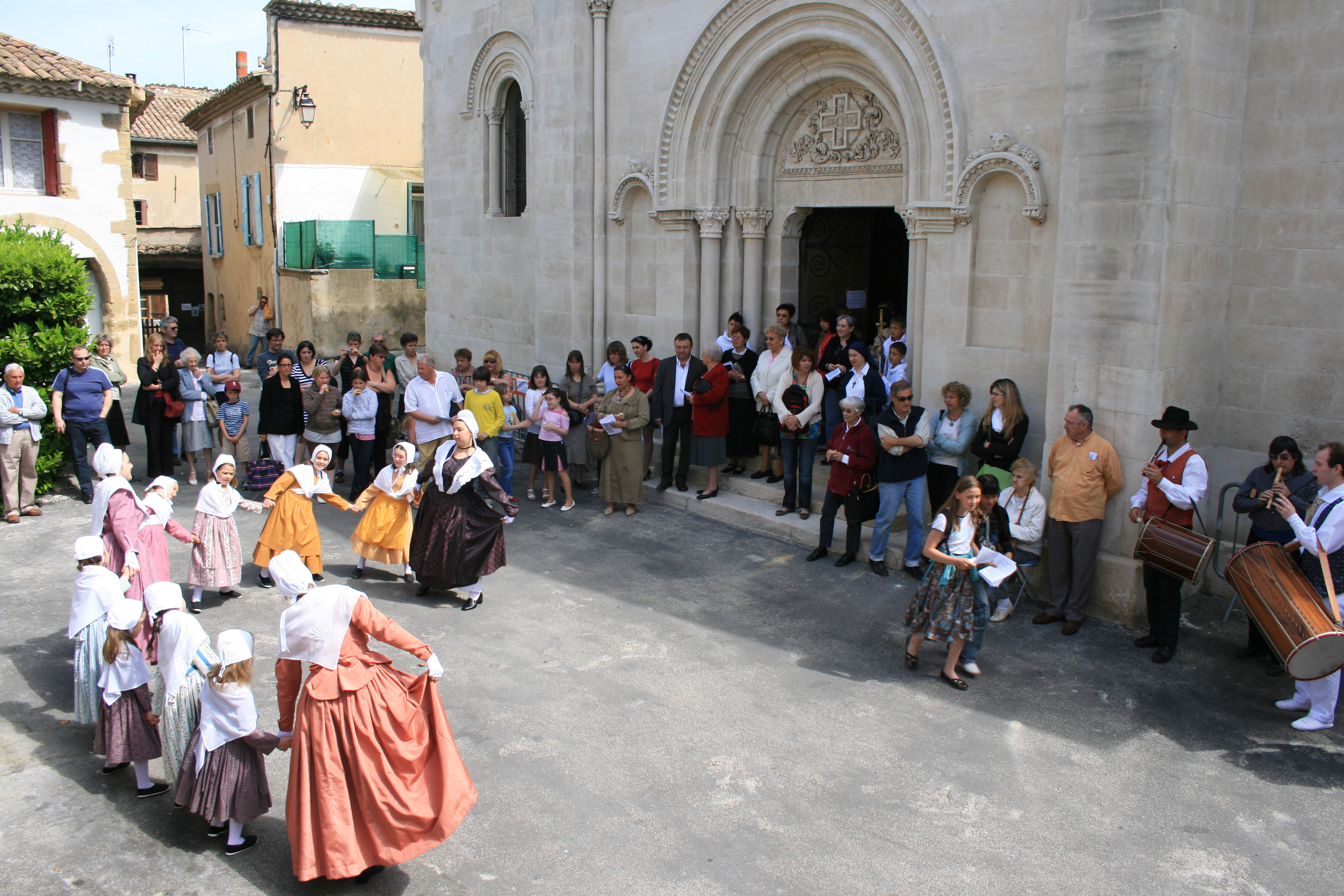
Farandole dancing in Saint-Geniès-de-Comolas

The farandole (French: [faʁɑ̃dɔl]; Provençal: farandola [faʀanˈdulɔ]) is an open-chain community dance popular in Provence, France. It bears similarities to the gavotte, jig, and tarantella. The carmagnole of the French Revolution is a derivative.

== Etymology ==
No satisfactory derivation has been given of the name. Diez connects it with the Spanish farándula, indicating a company of strolling players, which he derives from the German fahrende ("travelling"). A still more unlikely derivation has been suggested from the Greek fálanx (φάλαγξ, "phalanx") and doúlos (δούλος, "slave"), because the dancers in the farandole are linked together in a long chain. It has been also suggested that farandole may be an alteration of Provençal barandello, from brandello (derivative of branda, "stir"), under the influence of Occitan words such as flandina ("cajoler") and flandrina ("dawdle"). However, this hypothesis is not very convincing because it comes up against the fact that b(a)randello is defined as being a Languedocian farandole.

== History ==
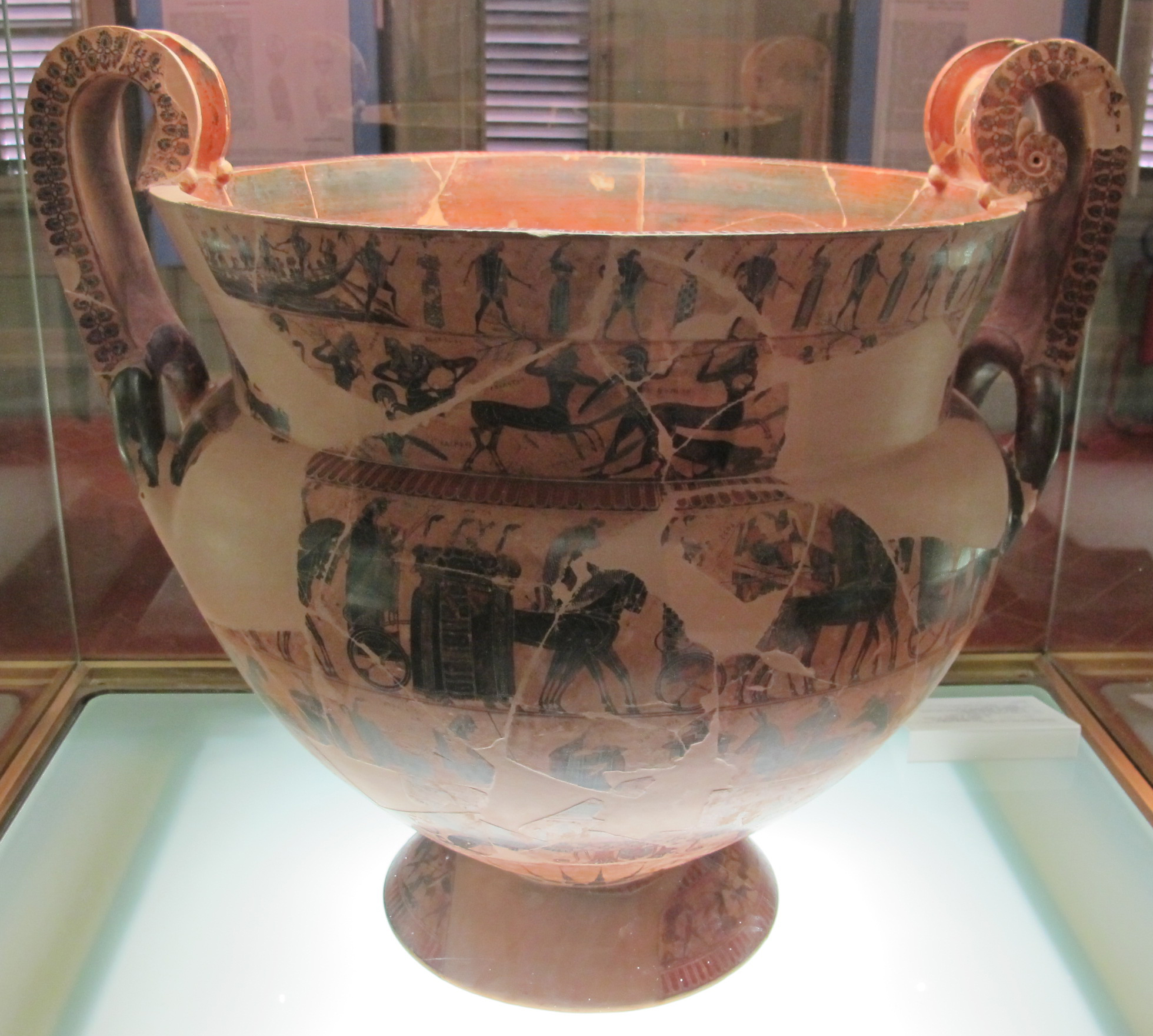
Dance of the cranes on the François vase of the National Archaeological Museum in Florence, Italy.

The farandole is considered as the oldest of the dances as well as the most characteristic and the most representative of Provence. Its name is attested only from the 18th century, however, it has been represented since prehistoric times by rock engravings then during Antiquity on ceramics or frescoes. Today in Provence, it is danced to the tunes played by the drummers who accompany it with their galoubets and their tambourines. Its popularity made it enter in the Christmas crib (crèche) of Provence and it is one of the most characteristic elements of the Provençal tradition.

The dance is very probably of Greek origin, and seems to be a direct descendant of the "Cranes' dance", the invention of which was ascribed to Theseus, who instituted it to celebrate his escape from the Labyrinth. This dance is alluded to at the end of the hymn to Delos by Callimachus: it is still danced in Greece and the islands of the Aegean, and may well have been introduced into the South of France from Marseilles.

Folklorists of the early 20th century (e.g. Alford 1932) interpreted most folk dances as being very ancient, and postulated even for the farandole an ancestry traceable to ancient Greece, remaining more or less unchanged "during its two or three thousands years of life".

Many recent websites, older encyclopedias, and some music history books claim that the farandole is a medieval dance, but never provide an actual medieval quote mentioning the farandole. While there exist Renaissance descriptions of chain and circle dances, and medieval and renaissance iconography showing people dancing in chains and circles, there is no connection between these early dances and the recent folk farandole: Arbeau, the most well-known source for renaissance chain and circle dances such as the branle, does not contain any dance with farandole-specific steps and figures. The term farandole or farandola is not found in dictionaries of Old French or of Old Occitan, and the earliest appearance in the French form farandoule (as being derived from Occitan) is in 1776. Its earliest appearance in English is even younger, 1876. Consequently, the medieval dance researcher Robert Mullally concludes that there is no evidence that the modern folk farandole resembles any kind of medieval dance.

The farandole was first described in detail by the English folklorist Violet Alford in 1932. The following description is from the county of Nice:

"Traditionally led by the abbat-mage holding a ribboned halberd, the dancers hold hands and skip at every beat; strong beats on one foot, alternating left and right, with the other foot in the air, and weak beats with both feet together. In the village of Belvédère, on the occasion of the festival honouring patron Saint Blaise, the most recently married couple leads the dance."

Musically, the dance is in 6/8 time, with a strongly accentuated rhythm, moderate to fast tempo, and played by a flute and drum. Another description of this dance comes from Grove's dictionary,

"The Farandole consists of a long string of young men and women, sometimes as many as a hundred in number, holding one another by the hands, or by ribbons or handkerchiefs. The leader is always a bachelor, and he is preceded by one or more musicians playing the galoubet, i.e. a small wooden flûte-à-bec, and the tambourin. With his left hand the leader holds the hand of his partner, in his right he waves a flag, handkerchief, or ribbon, which serves as a signal for his followers. As the Faraudole proceeds through the streets of the town the string of dancers is constantly recruited by fresh additions. The leader (to quote the poet Mistral) 'makes it come and go, turn backwards and forwards ... sometimes he forms it into a ring, sometimes winds it in a spiral, then he breaks off from his followers and dances in front, then he joins on again, and makes it pass rapidly under the uplifted arms of the last couple.'"

The farandole is usually danced at all the great feasts in the towns of Provence, such as the feast of Corpus Domini, or the Corsos do la Tarasqua, which were founded by King René on April 14, 1474, and take place at Tarascon annually on July 29. In the latter the farandole is preceded by the huge effigy of a legendary monster—the Tarasque—borne by several men and attended by the gaily dressed chevaliers de la Tarasque.

The farandole has occasionally been used for less innocent purposes than that of a mere dance: in 1815 General Jean-Pierre Ramel was murdered in Toulouse by the infuriated populace, who made use of their national dance to surround and butcher him.

== Variants ==
=== Farandole of the Death ===
After the Black Death, numerous exorcism rites appeared which aimed to tame the comrade, if not to push it back. In these rituals, music and dance played the leading roles.

In this farandole, skeletons and living people alternate, arranged in a descending hierarchical order: the pope, the emperor, the cardinal, the king, the patriarch, the constable, the archbishop, the knight, the bishop, the squire, the abbot, the bailiff, the astrologer, the bourgeois, the Carthusian, the sergeant, the doctor, the wife, the usurer, and the poor. The number of characters and the composition of the dance depends on the place of creation. Death, most often represented with a musical instrument, draws everyone into the dance, not looking at rank, wealth, gender, or age.

=== Modern farandole ===
Current musical accompaniment is always performed by one or more drummers. The dancers join hands to form a wandering open chain and mark each beat with jumps. The leader guides the chain by drawing a snake shape. Its role is to articulate the farandole, dance of agrarian rites, in its two main themes: that of the spiral (also known as the snail or labyrinth) and that of the passage under the vault (known as the serpent).

Also in Provence, other dances related to the farandole were practiced on more free steps: the brandi, the morisca ("Moorish"), the passa-carriera ("street passer", cf. the Spanish passacalle and the passacaille). It gave birth to certain medieval dances with repeated steps, such as the caroles of the 13th and 14th centuries, the branles of the 15th and 16th centuries.

=== Farandole of Provence ===
The santons dancing the farandole are one of the classics of the Provence crib. The dancers form a long line which moves by meandering. The twists and turns of this dance in the crèche must represent a labyrinth. The dancers are either dressed in traditional Arles, Provençal, or Comtadin clothing, with the different clothing nuances provided by the local santonnier.

The dancers and the drummer wear an almost identical costume made up of white pants tightened by a taiole, a typical belt from Provence made up of a strip of red woolen fabric, and a white shirt tied at the collar by a cord.

As the drummer is notable, he has put on his most elegant costume, wears a wide-brimmed felt hat, and under his velvet jacket appears his embroidered waistcoat on his white shirt. Nicknamed "Guillaume", by tradition, it is he who leads the farandole with his tambourine and his galoubet. This scene is one of the major subjects of the Provençal crib, to which it is essential.

== In classical music ==
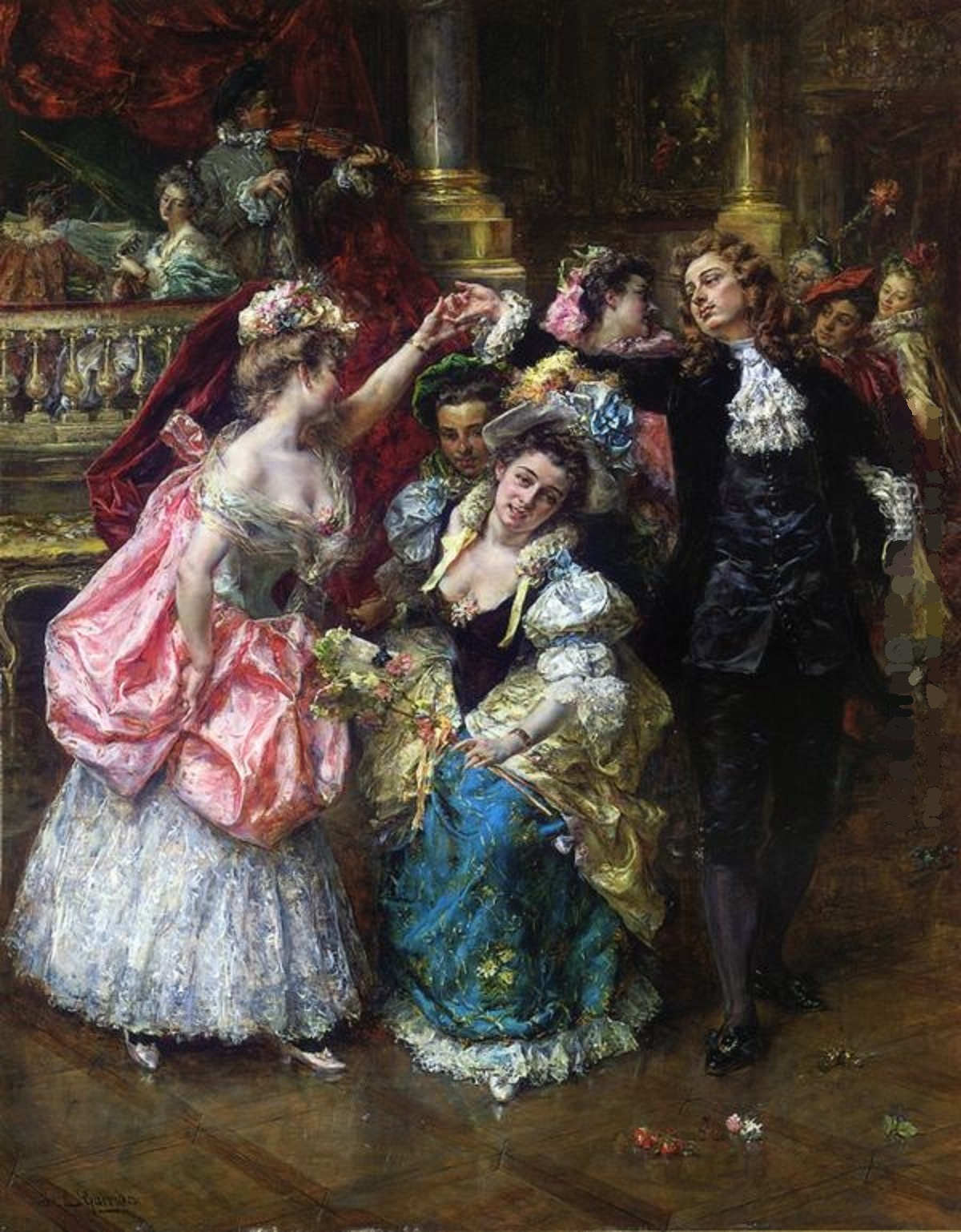
Farandole du ballet de Marseille (Farandole of the Ballet de Marseille) by Eduardo León Garrido

Charles Gounod used a farandole, set in front of the Arles Amphitheatre, to open the second act of his opera Mireille (1864). Georges Bizet features the farandole as the fourth and concluding movement of his second L'Arlésienne suite (1872). However, the dance is not suited for the purposes of the ballet. In Tchaikovsky's The Sleeping Beauty ballet (1890), the dames propose a farandole in the fourth scene of the second act. There is a farandole in Camille Saint-Saëns' opera Les Barbares (1901), and a farandole is present in the classical saxophone piece Tableaux de Provence (1958) by Paule Maurice, the first movement of five.

== In popular culture ==
In the 1940 Abbott and Costello film A Night in the Tropics, the movie ends with the singing and dancing of Bizet's farandole.

In 1969, a band by the name of "Love Sculpture" had an album entitled Forms & Feelings. One of the songs was Bizet's farandole.

Bob James, on his album Two, performed Bizet's farandole in a jazz funk style. Released in 1975, the album charted at number two on the Jazz Album Charts.

During his time as a member of the 1980s metal band Talas, Billy Sheehan performed another rock cover of Bizet's farandole, which was subsequently covered, in a similar manner by Dream Theater.

In Madeleine L'Engle's A Wind in the Door, the "Farandolae" are fictional organelles of mitochondria, which have a similar endosymbiotic relationship with mitochondria, as mitochondria have with eukaryotic cells. Over the course of the novel, characters physically journey inside a mitochondrion and encounter the farandolae as sentient creatures that do circular "dances" around their "trees of origin" that drain the elder fara of energy.

Within the Society for Creative Anachronism and other associations who attempt to recreate dances of the Middle Ages and Renaissance, the farandole is sometimes danced due to its assumed medieval origin (but see the historical concerns above). Examples can be found on YouTube.
