= Jeanne Julia Bartet =

French actress (1854-1941)

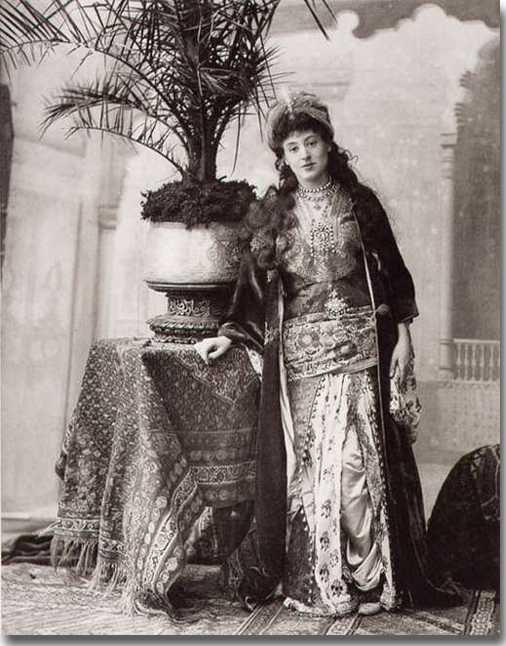
- Julia Bartet by Nadar, young white woman in stage costume of an oriental appearance; she has long dark hair
- Born: 28 October 1854; Paris
- Died: 18 November 1941 (aged 87)
- Occupation: actress

Julia Bartet was the stage name of Jeanne-Julie Regnault (28 October 1854 – 18 November 1941), a French actress. After training at the Paris Conservatoire she began her professional career in 1872, and from 1880 to her retirement in 1920 she was a leading member of the Comédie-Française. Her range was wide, and she appeared in classic plays and modern drama, in comedy and tragedy.

== Life and career ==
=== Early years ===
Bartet was born Jeanne-Julie Regnault on 20 October 1854 in the 1st arrondissement of Paris. She studied at the Paris Conservatoire under the prominent actor and teacher François-Joseph Regnier. She won the conservatoire's second prize for comedy in 1872 and made her first professional stage appearance in October of that year, adopting the stage name Bartet to avoid confusion with the established star actress Alice Regnault. Her first role was Vivette in the first production of Daudet 's L'Arlesienne at the Théâtre du Vaudeville, Paris.

During the 1870s her other roles included Marguerite in Sardou's Les Ganaches (1874); Manon in Manon Lescaut (1875); Fanny Merson in Émile Augier's Madame Caverlet (1876); Comtesse Zicka in Dora (1877) and leading parts in Les Bourgeois de Pont-Arcy (1878); Montjoye (1879) and Les Tapageurs (1879). Her portrait was painted by Aimé Morot in 1881 and is at the Musée Carnavalet in Paris.

=== Comédie-Française ===
In 1879 Bartet was engaged by the Comédie-Française, where she made her début on 16 February 1880, as Léa in Sardou's Daniel Rochat; later in that year she took over from Sarah Bernhardt as the Queen in Ruy Blas. On 24 December 1880 she was appointed as a sociétaire. Over the next forty years she played ninety roles at the Comédie-Française, ranging from comedy to tragedy, gaining the nickname "La Divine". In her entry in Who's Who in the Theatre she listed more than forty plays that she considered particular successes, including Adrienne Lecouvreur, Andromaque, Antigone, Antigone, Bérénice, Hernani, Iphigénie, Le Roi s'amuse and Les Femmes savantes. (Note: The others were L'École des Maris, Françillon, La Souris, Denise, Le Gendre de M. Poirier, L'Etrangère, Le Depit amoureux, L'Impromptu de Versailles, On ne badine pas avec l'amour, Les Rantzau, La Nuit d'Octobre, Jean Beaudry, Mademoiselle de Belle-isle, Thermidor, Pépa, La Visite de noces, Grisélidis, Par le Glaive, Le Pardon, L'Ami des femmes, La Loi de l'homme, Le Torrent, Le Dédale, L'Autre danger, Le Marquis de Priola, L'Enigme, Le Réveil, Notre jeunesse, Le Duel, Le Foyer, Connais-toi, Le Songe d'un soir d'amour, Apres-moi and Bagatelle.)

Le Figaro said that Bartet served the Comédie-Française with incomparable nobility, and commented that her "scholarly and understated elegance … her refined grace, her restrained and profound pathos" were "one of the models of the French woman". Her retirement from the stage in 1920 was international news. In London The Times called it a loss that all French people would feel; The New York Herald praised Bartet's generosity in stepping down to make way for younger members of the Comédie-Française, but asked, "Who among the younger actressess is capable of filling Mme. Bartet's place?" On her retirement she was made an Officier of the Legion of Honour.

Bartet died at her home in the 8th arrondissement of Paris on 18 November 1941, at the age of 87 and was interred in the Passy Cemetery.

== Notes, references and sources ==
=== Sources ===
- Parker, John, ed. (1922). Who's Who in the Theatre (fourth ed.). London: Sir Isaac Pitman and Sons. OCLC 473894893.
