= The March of the Kings =

Folk song from Provence

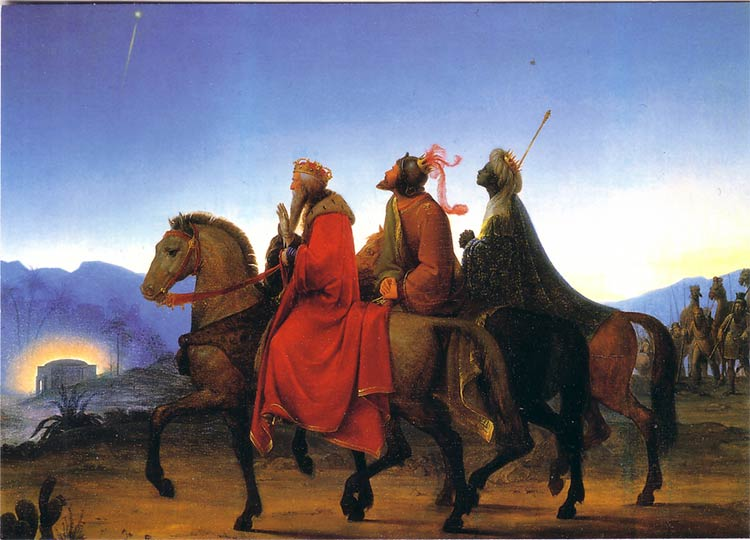
Leopold Kupelwieser, Le voyage des trois Rois, 1825, Diocèse de Rouen

The March of the Kings or The March of the Wise Men (French: La Marche des rois or La marche des Rois mages; Provençal: La Marcha dei reis) is a popular Christmas carol of provençal origin celebrating the Epiphany and the Wise Men. Recognition of the theme spread outside Provence when Georges Bizet used it in his incidental music for Arlésienne.

== History ==
=== Origin and attributions ===
The precise origins of both the tune and the lyrics are uncertain and debated.

The lyrics are regularly attributed to Joseph-François Domergue (1691 – 2 April 1728, died in Avignon), priest-dean of Aramon, in the Gard, from 1724 to 1728, whose name appears on the first manuscript copy of the lyrics, dated 1742 and preserved in the library of Avignon.

The text was published in Paris in 1759 in the Recueil de cantiques spirituels provençaux et françois gravés par le Sieur Hue. Subsequently, the work was added to the various (expanded) editions of the Provençal Christmas collection by the poet and composer of the seventeenth century Nicolas Saboly (1614–1675) to which it has often and erroneously been attributed.

According to the 1742 document, the text can be sung on the tune of a Marche de Turenne ('March of Turenne'). This mention corresponds to the established practice of christmasists, consisting of placing their texts on "known" French songs spread by the printing press. One hypothesis is that this Marche de Turenne would be a military march dating back to the 17th century, in honor of the victories of Marshal Turenne, Such a Marche de Turenne has however not been found. Some authors wanted to attribute it to Jean-Baptiste Lully, although no document corroborates this attribution.

An Avignon tradition rather dates the Marche de Turenne back to the fifteenth century, at the time of King René (1409–1480), while some authors from the late 19th century and the beginning of the 20th leaned towards a reference to Raymond VIII of Turenne (1352–1413), known as "The Scourge of Provence", grand-nephew of Pope Clement VI and nephew of Pope Gregory XI.

In the 21st century, several American scholars have suggested that the March of the Kings has a medieval origin dating back to the 13th century. It could then be one of the oldest Christmas carols listed with Veni redemptor gentium and one of the first entirely composed in vernacular, and not in Latin.

According to research carried out by the scholar Stéphen d'Arve (Edmond de Catelin) at the end of the nineteenth century, the only known score is that of Étienne-Paul Charbonnier (1793–1872), organist at the Aix Cathedral, who, perhaps taking it from the chain of its predecessors, had reconstructed it from memory by modifying its orchestration as new instruments were introduced. Henri Maréchal, an inspector of the Conservatoires de France having done research at the request of Frédéric Mistral, thought that La Marcha dei Rèis must have been composed by Abbé Domergue himself.

=== Epiphany celebration ===
Every year, the Epiphany feast gives rise in certain towns and villages of Provence to popular parades, the "Marches des Rois", where citizens sumptuously dressed as Biblical Magi progress towards the local church to the sound of the March and other traditional music, accompanied by inhabitants dressed according to local folklore. Particularly at Aix-en-Provence, from the beginning of the nineteenth century, a sumptuous popular ceremony celebrates the visit of the kings: a traditional procession of characters dressed in Provençal costumes (shepherds, horsemen, drummers, trades, etc.) accompanies the Magi and their camels to Saint-Sauveur Cathedral where the organist, accompanied by drummers, performs the air of the "March of the Kings" at the arrival of the procession, passing from "pianissimo" to "fortissimo" to evoke the approach of the procession. A large star is then lit on the main altar, symbolizing the star that guided the Magi to Bethlehem. The ceremony ends as the tune plays descrescendo when the Kings leave.

Joseph d'Ortigue wrote in 1837:

When the day of the Epiphany came, you would have heard this beautiful march of the Kings so well known in the south of France. It was at first like a confused murmur, a dubious rhythm which, starting from the extremities of the pianissimo, gradually became more distinct through the intermediate keyboards, to signify the pilgrimage of the Magi, come from their distant country. to prostrate oneself in the presence of the Child-God; soon the triumphal march was intoned magnificently on the most brilliant stops. It would then pick up again, then fade away imperceptibly until the sounds and the rhythm were lost in the distance.

=== Covers and adaptations ===
The March of the Kings is one of the themes of the overture of l'Arlésienne (1872), incidental music composed by Georges Bizet for a drama on a Provençal subject by Alphonse Daudet. According to the musicologist Joseph Clamon, Bizet could find the melody of this march in a book published in 1864. After the failure of the drama, Bizet drew from the incidental music a suite for orchestra (Suite n° 1) which was an immediate success. In 1879, four years after the composer's death, his friend Ernest Guiraud produced a second suite (Suite n° 2) in which the March of the Kings is repeated in canon in the last part of the revised work.

Certain passages are also found in the operetta Gillette de Narbonne by Edmond Audran, created in 1882. The words of a song "M'sieu d'Turenne", which can be sung to the tune of the March of the Kings, are due to fr:Léon Durocher (1862-1918).

The March of the Kings has become a traditional chanson de France and one of the most common Christmas carols in the repertoire of French-speaking choirs. It has been performed several times by performers such as Tino Rossi, fr:Les Quatre Barbus, Marie-Michèle Desrosiers or, in English, Robert Merrill. The piece has been adapted many times, notably by the organist Pierre Cochereau through an improvised toccata in 1973 for the Suite à la française sur des thèmes populaires.

== Lyrics ==
Abbot Domergue's original provençal text describes, at least in the first few stanzas, a sumptuous convoy accompanying three kings surrounded by bodyguards, from the perspective of a passerby who decides in the fourth stanza to join them. The rest of the song describe Casper and Melchior presenting their traditional gifts (gold and incense), and the seventh stanza is sung from the perspective of Balthazar, who presents the myrrh while prophesying Christ's death on the cross. The eighth stanza refers to various biblical passages not related to the nativity.

(Please note that the lyrics may be inaccurate and the song could use some further expansion)

French

De bon ma-tin,
J'ai, ren-con-tré le train
Di trois grands rois qui al-laient
En voy-a-ge

De bon ma-tin,
J'ai, ren-con-tré le train
De trois grands rois des-sus le
Grand che-min

Tout char-gés d'or
Les sui-vant d'a bord
De grands guer-riers
Et les gar-des du tré-sor,

Tout char-gés d'or
Les sui-vant d'a bord
De grands guer-riers a-vec leurs
Boucliers.

English

Early this morning,
I met the train
Of three great kings who were going
On a journey

Early this morning,
I met the train
Of three great kings on the
highway

All laden with gold
Following them on board were
Great warriors
And the guardians of the treasure,

All laden with gold
Following them on board were
Great warriors with their
Shields.
