= Pierre Lantier =

French composer and pianist

Pierre Lantier (30 April 1910 – 4 April 1998) was a French composer and pianist, and the husband of fellow composer Paule Maurice.

Born in Marseille, Lantier was affiliated with the Conservatoire de Paris. In 1937, he won the prestigious Prix de Rome composition scholarship (a prize he shared with Victor Serventi).

One of Lantier's most widely known works is a Sicilienne for alto saxophone and piano. His many other chamber-music pieces include Andante et Scherzetto, for saxophone quartet; an Introduction, Romance, et Allegro, for bass trombone and piano; a sonata for trumpet and piano; and Euskaldunak, a sonata for alto saxophone and piano.

His larger-scale compositions include a Requiem (premiered in 1981), as well as three works for piano and orchestra. His music continues to be championed by present-day conductor Patrick Botti.

Pierre Lantier died on 4 April 1998 in Ollioules in southeastern France.
