= Antony Choudens =

French music publisher (1849–1902)

Antony de Choudens
- Born: 11 February 1849; Paris, France
- Died: 15 July 1902 (aged 53); Fontainebleau, France
- Occupations: Music publisher, composer

Antony Choudens (11 February 1849 – 15 July 1902) was a French music publisher and occasional composer.

== Life and business history ==
Choudens was born in Paris. He succeeded his father Antoine de Choudens (1825–1888), who had founded the Paris-based company in May 1844, and which had grown to importance following the successful publication of Charles Gounod's opera Faust in 1859. He was also the nephew of the librettist Émilien Pacini. He studied harmony with Georges Bizet.

From November 1874, Antony de Choudens participated with 10 percent in the shares of the company, with 80 percent held by his father and the remaining 10 percent by his brother Paul. Following the death of their father in November 1888, the brothers took over the company, with Antoine holding 40 percent and Paul 60 percent. The company closed down in 1914.

The company traded as Choudens (1844–1874), Choudens père et fils (1875–1888), Choudens fils (1889–1891), Choudens or Paul Choudens (1892–1914). Their addresses in Paris (with approximate years of business) were:

- 10, rue Neuve du Luxembourg (1844–1845)
- 385, rue Saint Honoré (June 1850 – August 1852)
- 371, rue Saint Honoré (around 1855)
- 265, rue Saint Honoré (1857 – April 1885)
- 26, boulevard des Capucines (April 1885 – July 1886)
- 30, boulevard des Capucines (March 1887 – 1914)

Antony de Choudens died in Fontainebleau.

== Selected compositions ==
- À une étoile, melody with lyrics by Alfred de Musset (1873)
- Graziella, two-act lyrical drama, on a libretto by Jules Barbier, after the novel by Alphonse de Lamartine, premiered at the Théâtre-Lyrique on 12 September 1877.

== Sources ==
- Devriès, Anik; Lesure, François (1988) [1979]. Dictionnaire des éditeurs de musique français (in French). Vol. 2. Genève: Minkoff. pp. 107–109. ISBN 9782826604532. OCLC 5368474.
- Agnès Chauvin: "L'Hôtel Choudens", in: Livraisons d'histoire de l'architecture, no. 18, 2nd semester 2009.
