= Magnanery =

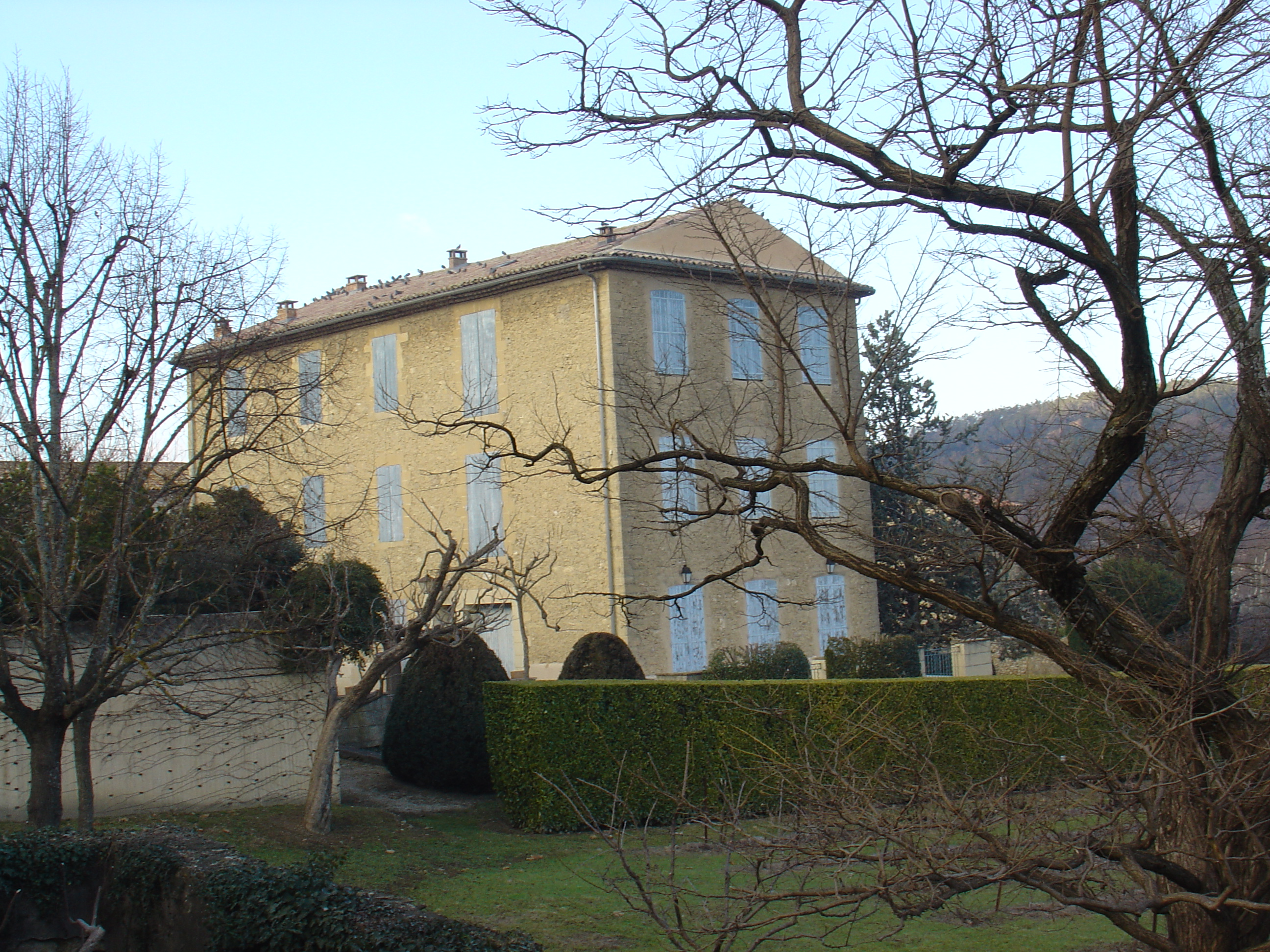
A former magnanery in Luberon

A magnanery (French: magnanerie) is the site of sericulture, or silk farming, similar to a farm being the site of agriculture. The yeoman who runs it is called a magnanier or, more recently, a mangnan. The word magnanière, meaning a building dedicated to sericulture, is also seen.

The word originated from the Occitan word magnan, as Provence was the centre of French sericulture.

The area around Saint-Hippolyte-du-Fort has magnaneries, and the town itself has a silk museum.
