= L'Arlésienne (short story) =

1869 short story by Alphonse Daudet

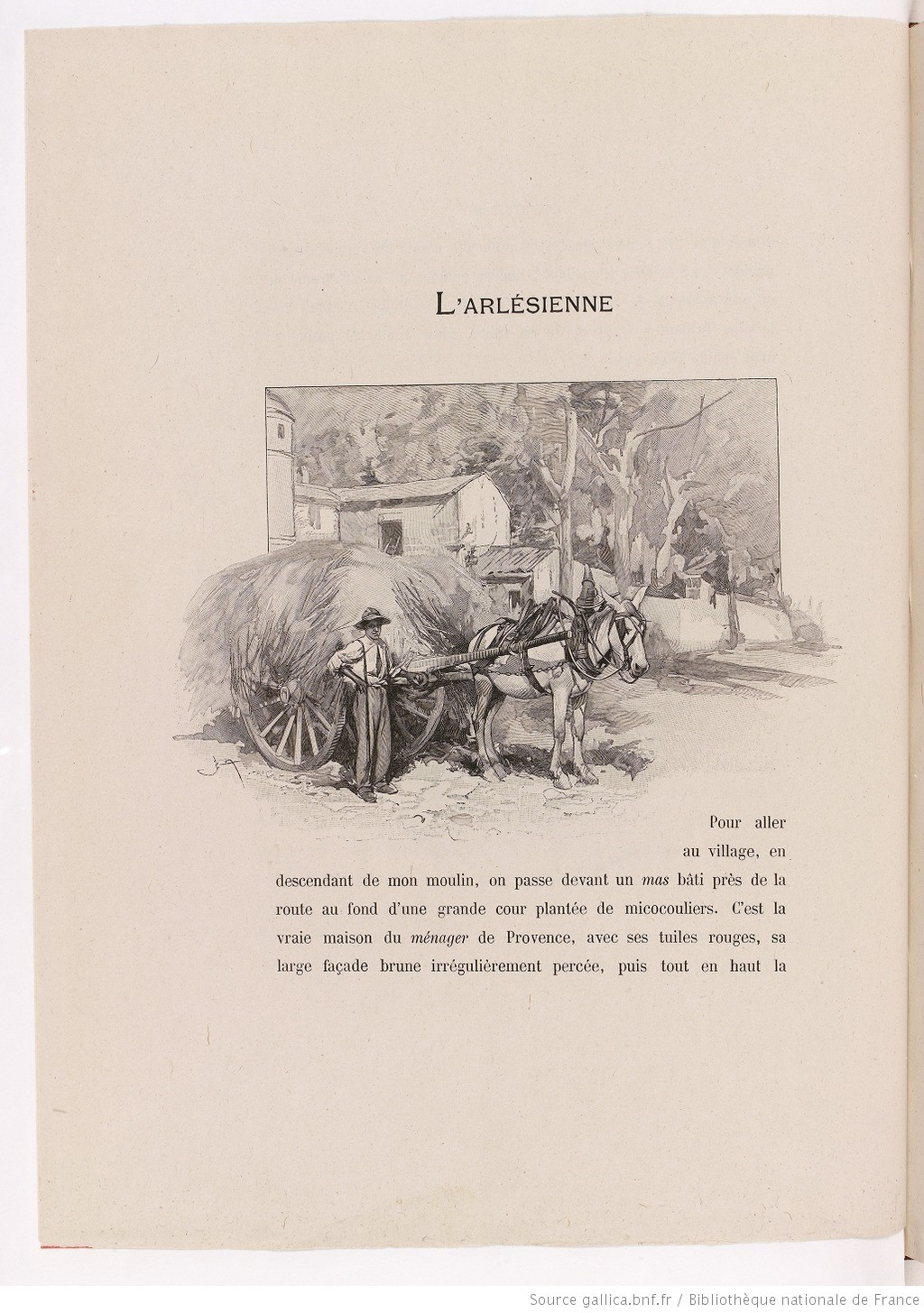
- Author: Alphonse Daudet
- Language: French
- Publication date: 1869

"L'Arlésienne" is a short story, written by Alphonse Daudet and first published in his collection Letters From My Windmill (Lettres de mon moulin) in 1869.

On a commission from Léon Carvalho, the author transformed the story in 1872 into a play in three acts and five tableaux with music and chorus. Georges Bizet wrote incidental music for the play's first production on 1 October 1872, at the Vaudeville Theatre (now the Gaumont).

The play was not successful and closed after only 21 performances. The music score was later used for two suites of the same name, the first established by Bizet himself in November 1872, the second after Bizet's 1875 death, by Ernest Guiraud.

Another play was originally scheduled for the night of 1 October 1872, but it was withdrawn by the censors at the last minute and L'Arlésienne was substituted. Many of the patrons were disappointed with this change.

Daudet's play formed the basis of the Italian opera L'arlesiana (1897) with text by Leopoldo Marenco and music by Francesco Cilea.

On 8 March 1999, BBC Radio 4 broadcast an adaptation of Daudet's play entitled The Girl from Arles, written by and translated from the French by Michael Robson and directed by Enyd Williams, with Frances Jeater as Rose Mamaï, John Woodvine as Balthazar, Mary Wimbush as Madame Renaud, Geoffrey Whitehead as Francet Mamaï, Gavin Muir as Mitifio, Giles Fagan as Frederi, Tilly Gaunt as Vivette and Ben Crowe as Marc.

== Roles ==
Role	Premiere Cast, 1 October 1872 (Conductor: Charles Constantin)
Balthazar	M. Parade
Fréderi	M. Abel
Le Patron Marc	M. Colson
Francet Mamaï	M. Cornaglia
Mitifio	M. Regnier
L’équipage	M. Lacroix
Un valet	M. Moisson
Rose Mamaï	Mme. Fargueil
Renaude	Mme. Alexis
L’Innocent	Mme. Morand
Vivette	Mme. J Barlet
Une servante	Mme. Leroy
Chorus

== Plot ==
The play is set in Provence, France. L’Arlésienne, which translates to "the girl from Arles", is loved by a young peasant Fréderi. However, upon discovering her infidelity prior to their wedding date, Fréderi approaches madness. His family tries at great length to "save" their son, but eventually Fréderi commits suicide by jumping off a balcony.

Although the drama was based on the author's short story of the same name, first published in the newspaper L'Événement (The Event, 1866), and later in his collection Lettres de mon moulin (Letters from My Windmill, 1869), the plot was originally inspired by a real event: the suicide of a nephew of writer Frédéric Mistral as a consequence of amour fou.

== Trivia ==
Because the title character is never shown in the play, Arlésienne is used in modern French to describe a person who is prominently absent from a place or a situation, especially an unseen character in a literary work.
