= Paule Maurice =

French composer

Paule Charlotte Marie Jeanne Maurice (29 September 1910 – 18 August 1967) was a French composer.

== Life and career ==
Maurice was born in Paris daughter to Raoul Auguste Alexandre Maurice and Marguerite Jeanne Lebrun. Registration lists at the Conservatoire National Supérieur de Musique de Paris report that her father was an office worker and state only that the two were married.

Her most famous composition is the suite Tableaux de Provence pour saxophone et orchestre written between 1948 and 1955 dedicated to saxophone virtuoso, Marcel Mule. It is most often heard as a piano reduction. It was premiered on 9 December 1958 by Jean-Marie Londeix with the Orchestre Symphonique Brestois directed by Maurice's husband, and fellow composer, Pierre Lantier.

Maurice's other compositions include Suite pour quatuor de flûtes, Volio, Cosmorama, Concerto pour piano et orchestre, Mémoires d'un chat, Trois pièces pour violon, and many more. There are more titles catalogued in the library of the Conservatoire National Supérieur de Musique de Paris where Maurice studied and spent her professional life. Paule Maurice's teachers included Jean Gallon (Harmony), Noël Gallon (Counterpoint and Fugue) and Henri Büsser (Composition). From 1933 to 1947 Maurice was Jean Gallon's teaching assistant. She received first prize of harmony in 1933, second prize of fugue in 1934, and in 1939 received first prize in composition. In 1942, Maurice was appointed Professor of Déchiffrage (sight-reading), and in 1965 became Professor of Harmonic Analysis at l'École Normale de Musique. Maurice taught many students who became professors to the Conservatoire National Supérieur de Musique de Paris with some winning the Prix de Rome (saxame.org).

Maurice and Pierre Lantier wrote a treatise on harmony entitled Complément du Traité d'Harmonie de Reber that became an important reference work in France and abroad. It was intended to be used in conjunction with the 1862 treatise of Napoléon Henri Reber entitled Traité d'Harmonie. The impact of Stravinsky, Debussy, and Ravel had created the need to update harmonic analysis.

Paule Maurice died at age 56 in Paris.

== List of works ==
Works list derived from Paule Maurice's 1960 curriculum vitae :

- Symphonie (1939)
- Concerto giocoso pour piano et orchestre (1950)
- Concerto (Concertino) pour piano et orchestre (1955)
- 2 ballets ("Cosmorama" - Commande de l’État; "Idylle exotique")
- Poème symphonique ("L’Embarquement pour Cithère" - Commande de l’État)
- Tableaux de Provence, suite pour saxophone et orchestre (1948–1955)
- 3 Suites d’orchestre ("Quartier latin", "Tourisme", "Night Club chez Belzébuth")
- Quatuor de flûtes
- Quatuor à cordes
- Trio pour anches
- Suite pour 2 pianos (9 pièces)
- Variations pour piano
- 5 Pièces pour piano (Ed. Durand)
- 9 Pièces pour piano (Ed. Leduc)
- 6 Pièces pour piano (Ed. P. Noël)
- 5 Préludes pour piano (Ed.Fongères)
- 3 Pièces violon piano (Ed. Noël)
- Mélodies (NOËL)
- Musiques de scène (Incidental music for: "Les caprices de Marianne", "On ne badine pas avec l'amour", "Watheau", "Patounet")
- Pièces pour flûte
- Pièces pour saxophone
- Pièces pour clarinette
- Chœurs mélodies

In preparation at the time of her 1960 curriculum vitae : Suite pour 2 pianos et orchestre.

Compositions documented by academic database WorldCat:

- Tableaux de Provence
- Suite pour quatuor de flûtes
- Volio (saxophone etude)
- Mémoires d'un chat
- Concerto pour piano et orchestre
- Cosmorama
- Trois pièces pour violon

== Awards ==
- Prix Helpheu (Composition)
- Prix du Congrès Marial de Boulogne pour une Cantate
- Prix pour l’ensemble de la composition féminine
- Prix du public et du Jury, Pasdeloup Orchestra
- Prix Georges Hüe pour la mélodie
