= Holy Family (Watteau) =

Painting by Antoine Watteau

- La Sainte Famille (French)
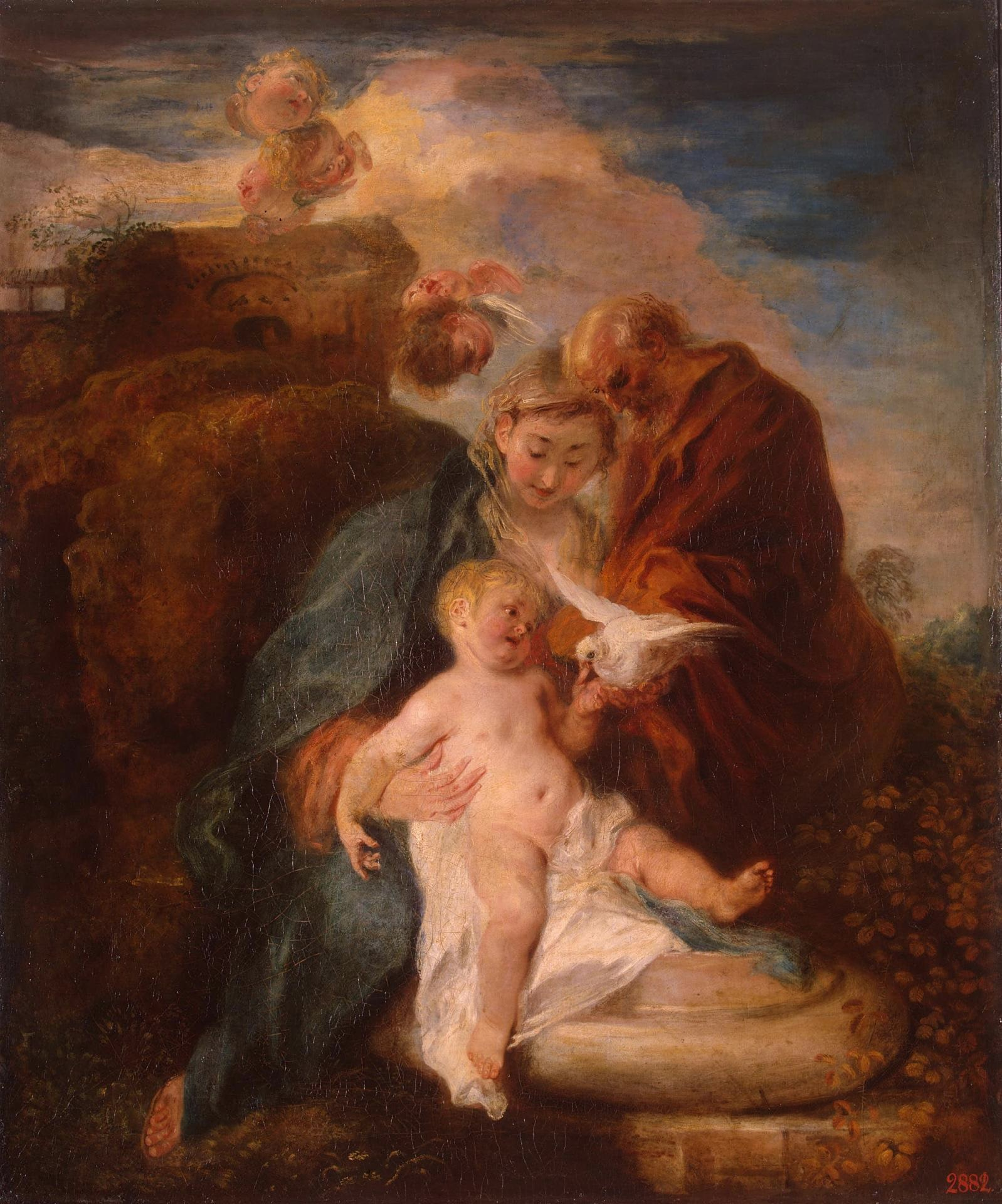
- Artist: Antoine Watteau
- Year: ca. 1714–1721
- Catalogue: H 6; G 31; DV 26; R 1; HA 181; EC 194; F B98; RM 236; RT 103
- Medium: oil on canvas
- Dimensions: 129 cm × 97.2 cm (51 in × 38.3 in)
- Location: Hermitage Museum, Saint Petersburg
- Accession: ГЭ-1288

Holy Family (La Sainte Famille), also called The Rest on the Flight into Egypt, is an oil on canvas painting by the French Rococo artist Antoine Watteau, now in the Hermitage Museum, Saint Petersburg. Variously dated between 1714 and 1721, Holy Family is possibly the rarest surviving religious subject in Watteau's art, related to either the Gospel of Matthew, or the Gospel of Pseudo-Matthew; it depicts the Virgin, the Christ Child, and Saint Joseph amid a landscape, surrounded by putti.

In the early 18th century, Holy Family belonged to Watteau's close friends, the royal councilor Nicolas Hénin and the manufacturer Jean de Jullienne; by the middle of that century, it entered the collection of Polish-Saxon statesman Heinrich, Count von Brühl. As part of the Brühl collection, the painting was acquired in 1769 for the Hermitage, then recently established by Empress Catherine II of Russia. Since the mid-19th century, it was present in the Tauride Palace, and later in the Gatchina Palace near Saint Petersburg; after the Russian Revolution, Holy Family entered the Hermitage again in 1920.

== Exhibition history ==
List of exhibitions featuring the work
| Year | Title | Location | Cat. no. | References |
|---|---|---|---|---|
| 1908 | Les anciennes écoles de peinture dans les palais et collections privées russes | Imperial Society for the Encouragement of the Arts, Saint Petersburg | 296 | |
| 1922–1925 | Temporary exhibition of new acquisition from French painting of the 17th and 18th centuries | Hermitage Museum, Petrograd (later Leningrad) | * | |
| 1965 | Chefs-d'oeuvre de la peinture française dans les musees de l'Ermitage et de Moscou | Musée des Beaux-Arts de Bordeaux, Bordeaux | 46 | |
| 1965–1966 | Chefs-d'oeuvre de la peinture française dans les musees de l'Ermitage et de Moscou | Louvre, Paris | 44 | |
| 1972 | Watteau and His Time | Hermitage Museum, Leningrad | 9 | |
| 1984 | Антуан Ватто. 300 лет со дня рождения | Hermitage Museum, Leningrad | * | |
| 1984–1985 | Watteau 1684–1721 | National Gallery of Art, Washington, D.C.; Galeries nationales du Grand Palais, Paris; Charlottenburg Palace, Berlin | P. 30 | |
General references: Grasselli, Rosenberg & Parmantier 1984, p. 316, Nemilova 1985b, p. 458. "*" denotes an unnumbered entry.
