= The Robber of the Sparrow's Nest =

Painting by Antoine Watteau

- Le Dénicheur de moineaux (French)
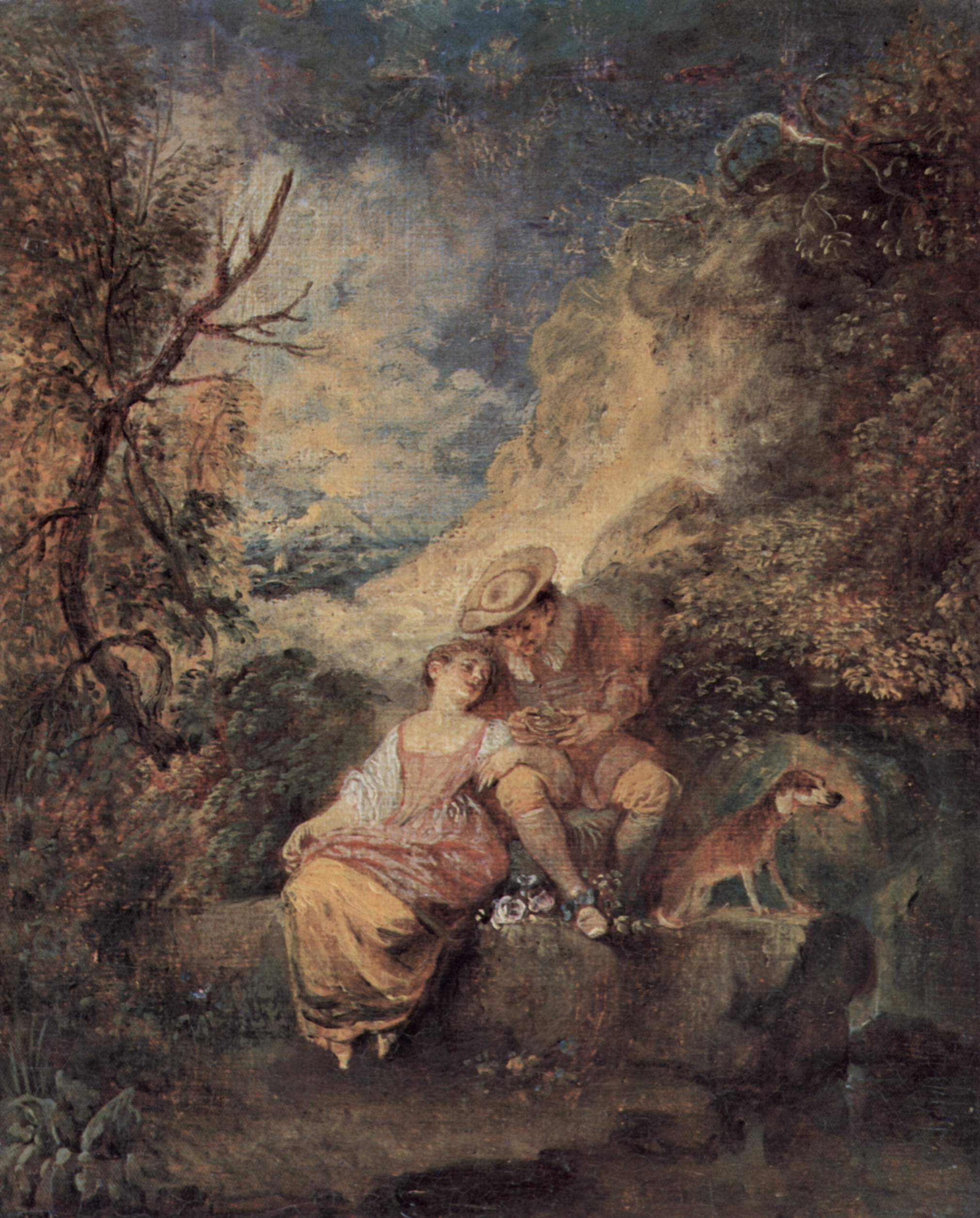
- Artist: Antoine Watteau
- Year: Between 1709 and 1716; See § Dating
- Catalogue: G 270; DV 10; R 261; HA 86; EC 71; F B84; RM 101; RT 19
- Medium: Oil on paper, glued on canvas mounted on wood panel
- Dimensions: 23.2 cm × 18.7 cm (9.1 in × 7.4 in)
- Location: National Galleries of Scotland; Edinburgh
- Accession: NG 370.1860

The Robber of the Sparrow's Nest (Le Dénicheur de moineaux) is an oil painting by the French Rococo artist Antoine Watteau, now in the National Galleries of Scotland, Edinburgh. Variously dated between 1709 and 1716, the painting is a pastoral scene that is one of a few extant arabesques in Watteau's art; it shows a young couple with a dog, sitting at a sparrow's nest; it has been thought to be influenced by Flemish Baroque painting, exactly by Peter Paul Rubens' painting from the Marie de' Medici cycle.

In the 18th century, The Robber of the Sparrow's Nest was once in the collection of Watteau's friend and patron Jean de Jullienne; passing through a number of private owners, it came into possession of the Scottish landscape painter Hugh William Williams by the early 19th century; in 1860, the latter's widow donated the painting to the National Gallery of Scotland.

== Exhibition history ==
List of exhibitions featuring the work
Year	Title	Location	Cat. no.
1909	National Loan Exhibition	Grafton Galleries, London	17
1949	Landscape in French Art	Royal Academy of Arts, London	101
2001	Scottish Treasures	National Galleries of Scotland, Edinburgh	15
General reference: Eidelberg 2020.

== Bibliography ==
- Adhémar, Hélène (1950). Watteau; sa vie, son oeuvre (in French). Includes "L’univers de Watteau", an introduction by René Huyghe. Paris: P. Tisné. cat. no. 86. OCLC 853537.
- Banks, Oliver T. (1977). Watteau and the North: Studies in the Dutch and Flemish Baroque Influence on French Rococo Painting. New York, London: Garland. p. 221. OCLC 1075255658.
- Camesasca, Ettore [in Portuguese] (1971). The Complete Painting of Watteau. Classics of the World's Great Art. Introduction by John Sutherland. New York: Harry N. Abrams. p. 101; cat. no. 71; black and white repr. at p. 100; colorpl. 2. ISBN 0810955253. OCLC 143069 – via the Internet Archive.
- Dilke, E. F. (1899). French Painters of the Eighteenth Century. London: G. Bell. p. 85. OCLC 1045594851.
- Eidelberg, Martin (March 2020). "Le Dénicheur de moineaux". A Watteau Abecedario. Archived from the original on 9 August 2020.
- Glorieux, Guillaume (2011). Watteau. Collection Les Phares (in French). Paris: Citadelles & Mazenod. p. 139. ISBN 9782850883408. OCLC 711039378.
- Goncourt, Edmond de (1875). Catalogue raisonné de l'oeuvre peint, dessiné et gravé d'Antoine Watteau. Paris: Rapilly. cat. no. 270. OCLC 1041772738 – via the Internet Archive.
- Josz, Virgile (1903). Watteau. Moeurs du XVIIIe siècle (in French). Paris: Société du Mercure de France. p. 83. OCLC 900757508 – via Google Books.
- Mantz, Paul (1892). Antoine Watteau. Paris: Librairie illustrée. pp. 28. OCLC 742536514 – via the Internet Archive.
- Mathey, Jacques (1959). Antoine Watteau. Peintures réapparues inconnues ou négligées par les historiens (in French). Paris: F. de Nobele. p. 67. OCLC 954214682.
- Michel, Christian (2008). Le "célèbre Watteau". Genève: Droz. p. 131. ISBN 978-2-600-01176-1. OCLC 1158803919.
- Moussalli, Ulysse (August 1958). "L'Enchantement de Watteau". Jardin des Arts (46): 645–652.
- National Gallery of Scotland, Edinburgh, ed. (1997). Concise Catalogue of Paintings (collection catalogue). Edinburgh: Trustees of the National Galleries of Scotland. p. 370. ISBN 0-903598-65-5.
- Phillips, Claude (1895). Antoine Watteau. London: Seeley and co. Limited. pp. 16–17. OCLC 729123867 – via the Internet Archive.
- Réau, Louis (1928–1930). "Watteau". In Dimier, Louis (ed.). Les peintres français du XVIII-e siècle: Histoire des vies et catalogue des œuvres (in French). Vol. 1. Paris: G. Van Oest. pp. 36, 50, cat. nos. 75, 261. OCLC 564527521.
- Roland Michel, Marianne (1981). Watteau: Tutti I Dipinti. I Maestri (in Italian). Vol. 19. Translated from the French by Marina Anzil Robertini. Milano: Rizzoli. cat. no. 101. OCLC 48636176. OCLC 801077589. Published in French as Tout Watteau. La Peinture. Paris: Flammarion. 1982. ISBN 2-08-012226-6. OCLC 490060827.
- Roland Michel, Marianne (1984). Watteau: An Artist of the Eighteenth Century. London: Trefoil. pp. 213, 269, 281-83, 304. ISBN 0862940494. OCLC 417153549.
- Temperini, Renaud (2002). Watteau. Maîtres de l'art (in French). Paris: Gallimard. p. 37, cat. 19. ISBN 9782070116867. OCLC 300225840.
- Tillerot, Isabelle (2011). "Engraving Watteau in the Eighteenth Century: Order and Display in the Recueil Jullienne". Getty Research Journal. 3 (3): 33–52. doi:10.1086/grj.3.23005386. eISSN 2329-1249. ISSN 1944-8740. JSTOR 23005386. S2CID 192107598.
- Zeri, Federico (2000) [first published in Italian in 1998]. Watteau: The Embarkment for Cythera. One Hundred Paintings. Richmond Hill, Ontario: NDE Pub. p. 44, 47. ISBN 1553210182. OCLC 48003550 – via the Internet Archive.
- Zimmermann, E. Heinrich [in German] (1912). Watteau: des Meisters Werke in 182 Abbildungen. Klassiker der Kunst (in German). Vol. 21. Stuttgart, Leipzig: Deutsche Verlags-Anstalt. p. 42. OCLC 561124140.
- Ziskin, Rochelle (2012). Sheltering Art: Collecting and Social Identity in Early Eighteenth-Century Paris. University Park, PA: Pennsylvania State University Press. pp. 171, 198. ISBN 978-0-271-03785-1.
