= Savoyard with a Marmot =

Painting by Antoine Watteau

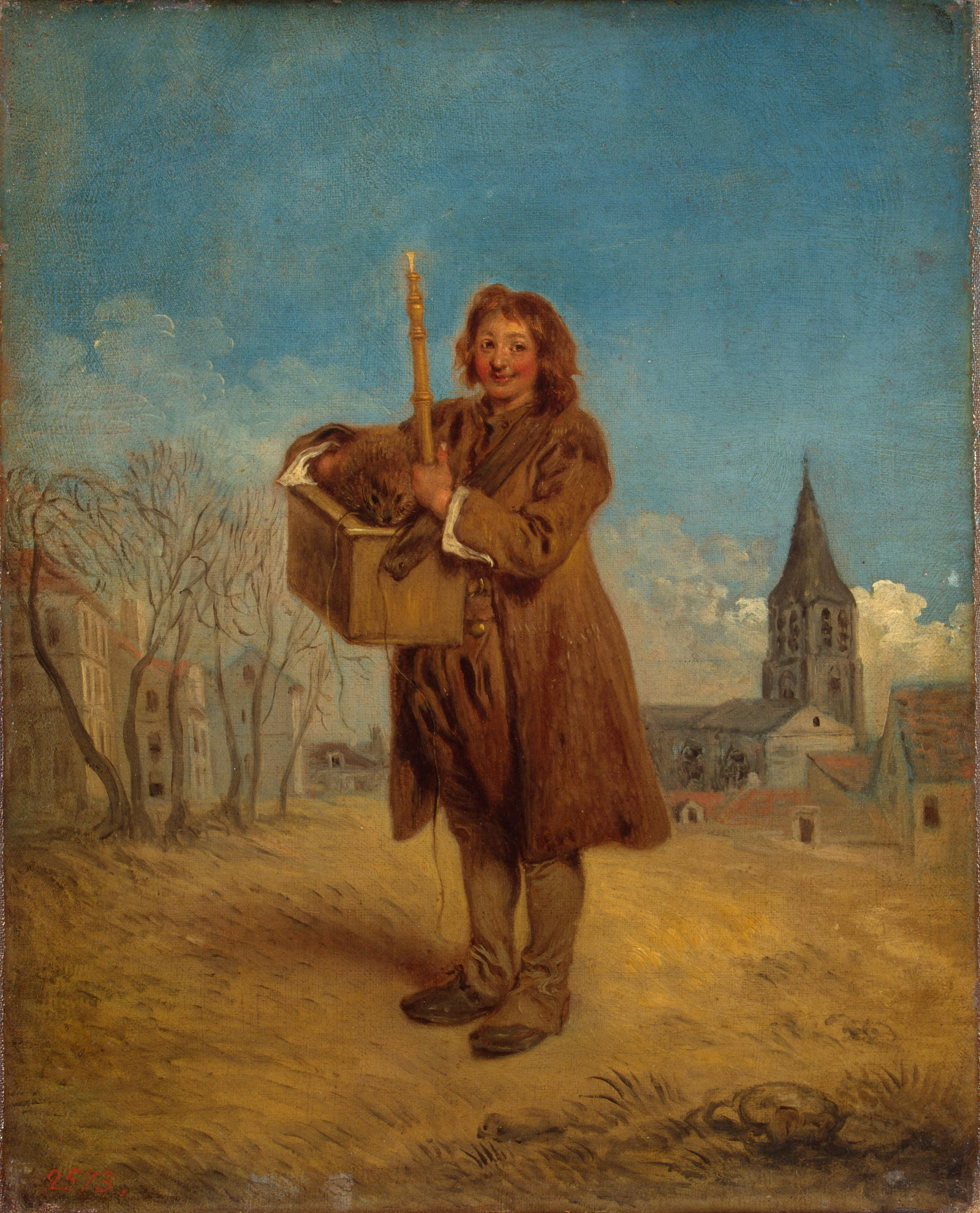
- Artist: Jean-Antoine Watteau
- Year: 1716
- Medium: Oil on canvas
- Dimensions: 40.5 cm × 32.5 cm (15.9 in × 12.8 in)
- Location: Hermitage Museum, St. Petersburg

Savoyard with a Marmot is an oil-on-canvas painting of 1716 by the French Rococo artist Jean-Antoine Watteau (1684–1721). It depicts an itinerant musician/raconteur from Savoy. The painting depicts his oboe and his trained companion marmot. Savoyards were known to utilize the animals at traveling shows and local fairs, having trained them to "tell fortunes" by pulling carded predictions from a hat. "Lied des Marmottenbuben" by Goethe, and Les deux petits savoyards both depict this.

According to Iris Lauterbach, "Watteau's paintings contain no lack of allusions to carnal desires...In Savoyard with a Marmot, for example, a showman with a cheerful smile on his face and carrying a cage with a marmot on top appears against a wintery setting. With his upright oboe, the man is making the marmot dance - a well-known sexual metaphor at that time."

The Hermitage Museum, where the painting is held, alternately states that the painting depicts the Savoyard's disassociation and loneliness; Savoy was a poor region, and emigres were often marginal outcasts within the lands they decamped for. Earlier, in 1715, Watteau had drawn an older Savoy woman with her boxed marmot in "Standing Savoyarde with a Marmot Box", before expanding the depth of the depiction with this work.

The painting was a part of Catherine the Great's collection, before transferring to the Hermitage Museum.
