= Pierrot (Watteau) =

Painting by Antoine Watteau

- Gilles
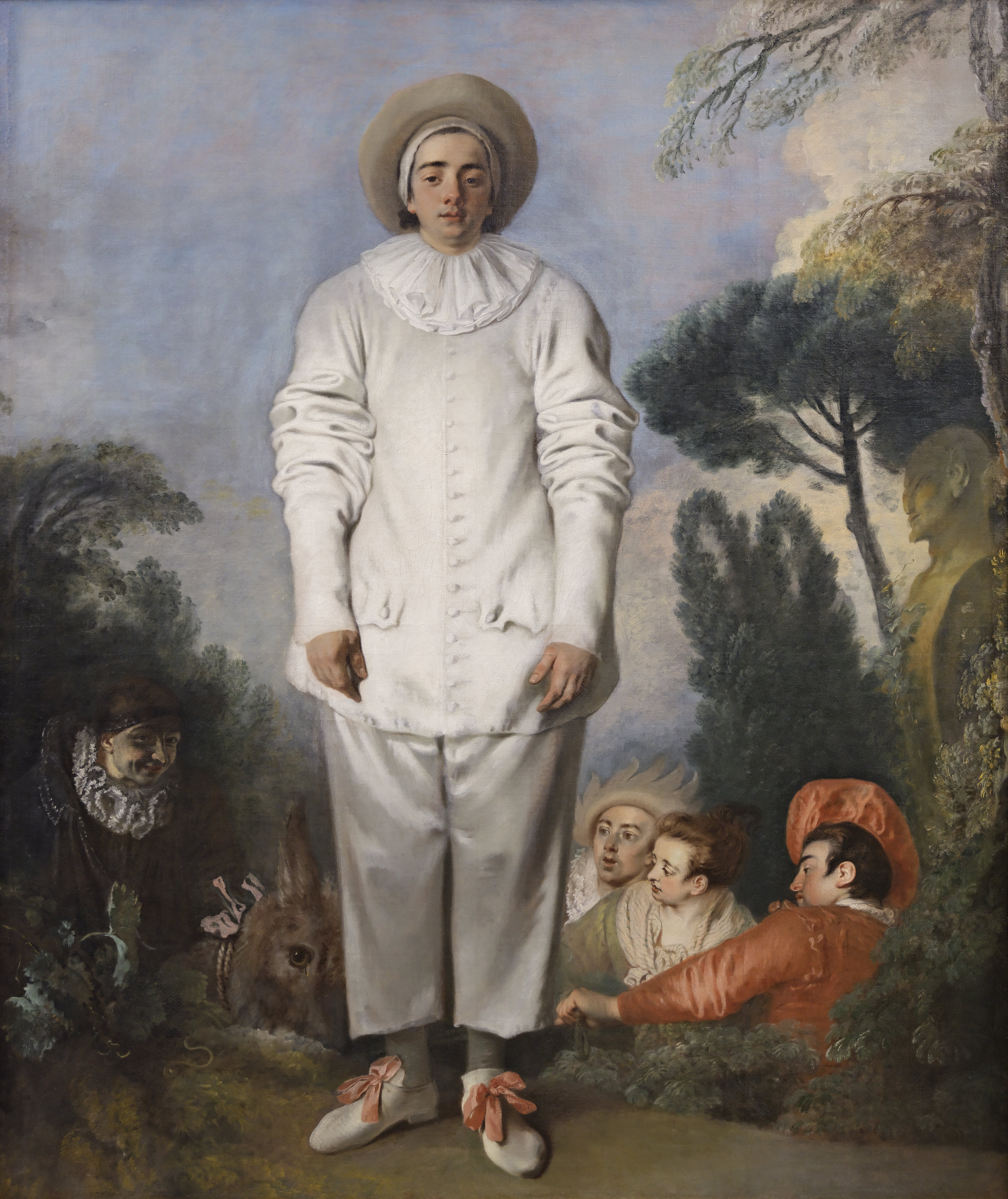
- Artist: Jean-Antoine Watteau
- Year: c. 1718-1719
- Medium: Oil on canvas
- Dimensions: 184.5 cm × 149.5 cm (72.6 in × 58.9 in)
- Location: Louvre, Paris
- Accession: M.I. 1121

Pierrot, formerly known as Gilles, is a life-size oil-on-canvas painting by the French artist Antoine Watteau, created between 1718 and 1719. Noted for its scale, the piece measures 184.5 x 149.5 cm and is the only life-size figure Watteau has represented. The painting depicts a variety of actors with the traditional commedia dell'arte character Pierrot in a still, frontal pose. The work has been part of the Louvre's collection since it was bequeathed in 1869.

== Background ==
Little is certain about the origin of the work. Generally dated to the 1710s, the painting was not included in the 18th century Recueil Jullienne, a major catalog of Watteau's work reproduced in prints. The painting was not mentioned in written records until 1826. Some scholars speculate that the painting originated as a shop sign, possibly one of two signs commissioned by the retired actor Belloni, an actor known for performing as Pierrot.

== Subject and description ==
Pierrot, who was often confused with the similarly comic buffoon known as "Gilles" in the 19th century, is the main figure. He is placed in white theatrical clothing, disengaged from the rest of his companions. His suit jacket has oversized sleeves, his pants are comically short, and he wears an abnormally large ruff. Marika Takanishi Knowles argues that the figure's stiff, frontal pose derives from the costume print genre, which featured full-length figures against minimal backgrounds.

The actors are likely in a park, set in front of pines, poplars, and a statue of a satyr. The identities of the four background characters are still a debated mystery. Many scholars agree the man riding the donkey on the left of the painting is the "Doctor", a recurring actor in Watteau's works. The identities of the three actors on the right side of the painting are unknown, however, it has been speculated that the man in red could be the "Captain," who appears in Watteau's Le Conteur, or "Mezzetin," who Watteau included in Les Comédiens Italiens.

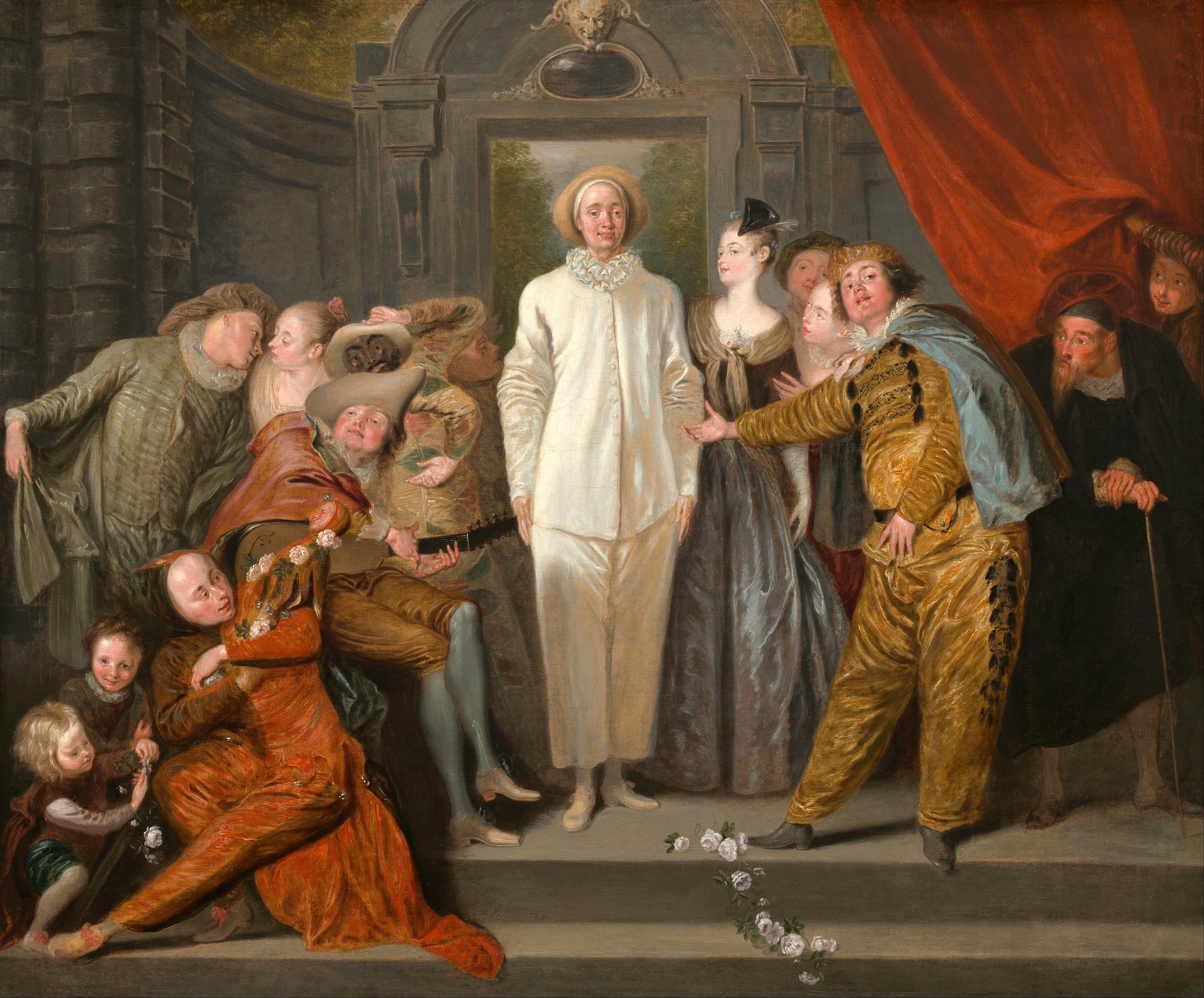
Les Comediens Italiens, Antoine Watteau 1719-1720

== Analysis ==
Pierrot's expression is the most highly debated part of the work. Some scholars read it as stupidity, while others see melancholy, poignancy, or even revery. Many art historians, such as Erwin Panofsky, see Pierrot as a melancholic reflection of Watteau himself. The association of the painting with melancholy has often led scholars to see the painting as a depiction of a "sad clown." Art historian Donald Posner refutes these claims, arguing that Pierrot's theatrical persona was not understood as a sad, lonely clown until the 19th century. Further, he argues that in Watteau's time Pierrot was more simple-minded and not inclined to display sensitive emotions, making Pierrot an improbable subject for melancholic self-reflection.

The background actors serve a vital role by using their varied, almost rhythmic poses to accentuate Pierrot’s rigidity, as if he were frozen in time. Separated from Pierrot below the mound, the actor's calm engagement with one another while ignoring Pierrot's presence serves to isolate Pierrot not only spatially, but also emotionally, highlighting his detachment from the group of fellow actors.

Pierrot’s identity is defined by the awkward proportions of his costume. The immense volume of his jacket and its oversized sleeves seem to weigh him down, while his short pants further highlight his foolish nature. This foolishness is again magnified by his fellow actors. The man in red wears a bright, well-fitting suit that stands in sharp contrast to Pierrot's, signaling the clown's incompetence compared to the rest of the actors.

== Provenance and legacy ==
In the early nineteenth century, a picture dealer struggling to sell the painting sought to entice buyers by writing the following words at the bottom of the painting in chalk: "How happy Pierrot would be, if he had the gift of pleasing you." It was then purchased for 150 francs by Vivant Denon, the director of museums under Napoleon. The painting changed hands several times before it was finally acquired in 1845 by Louis La Caze for 2,500 francs. La Caze bequeathed it to the Louvre in 1869.

In the 19th century, the painting influenced poets such as Paul Verlaine, who wrote a series of short poems named Fêtes galantes, after the category of painting that Watteau inspired. The work influenced a wide range of artists, including Picasso and Henri Rousseau. Additionally, the piece was part of the inspiration for the 1945 film Les Enfants du Paradis. The painting serves as the gold standard for depictions of Pierrot, to the point where many museums will assess their own paintings of the clown against Watteau's Pierrot as a check of authenticity.

== See also ==
List of works by Antoine Watteau
