= Antoine Watteau =

French painter (1684–1721)

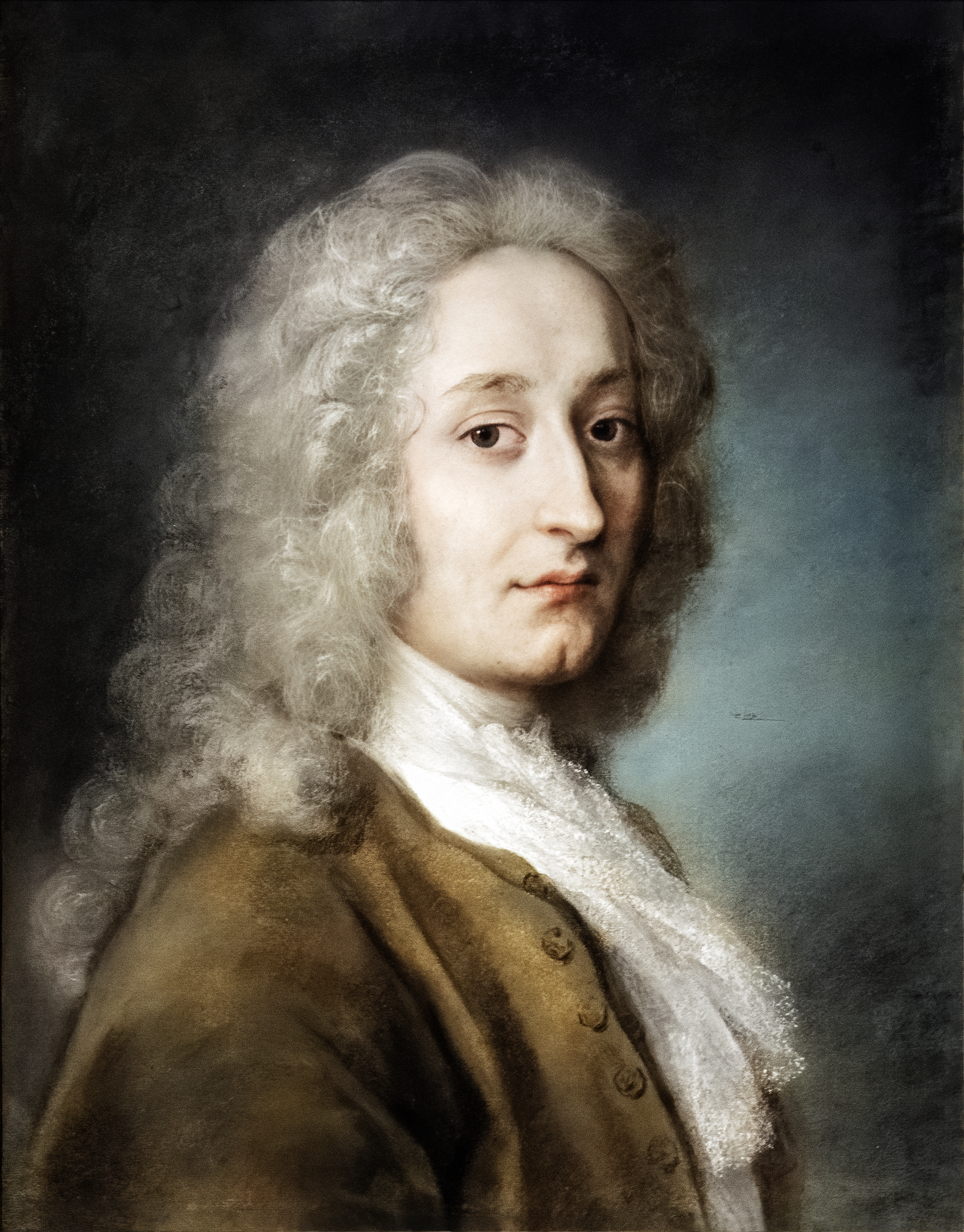
- Portrait by Rosalba Carriera, c. 1721
- Born: Jean-Antoine Watteau baptised 10 October 1684; Valenciennes, French Hainaut, France
- Died: 18 July 1721 (aged 36); Nogent-sur-Marne, France
- Education: Claude Gillot; Claude Audran III
- Known for: Painting and drawing
- Notable work: Embarkation for Cythera, 1717–1718; L'Enseigne de Gersaint, 1720–1721
- Movement: Rococo
- Patrons: Jean de Jullienne; Pierre Crozat; Edme-François Gersaint

Jean-Antoine Watteau (UK: /ˈwɒtoʊ/, US: /wɒˈtoʊ/; French: [ʒɑ̃ ɑ̃twan vato];Picard: [ʒɑ̃ ton wato]; baptised 10 October 1684 – died 18 July 1721) was a French painter and draughtsman whose brief career spurred the revival of interest in colour and movement, as seen in the tradition of Correggio and Rubens. He revitalized the waning Baroque style, shifting it to the less severe, more naturalistic, less formally classical, Rococo. Watteau is credited with inventing the genre of fêtes galantes, scenes of bucolic and idyllic charm, suffused with a theatrical air. Some of his best known subjects were drawn from the world of Italian comedy and ballet.

== Early life and training ==
Jean-Antoine Watteau (Note: The surname Watteau is presumed to originate from the word gâteau (transl. cake), possibly alluding to the trade carried on by the painter's distant ancestors; according to Mollett 1883, p. 11, "In the old Walloon language the W is substituted for G, and the very name 'Wallon' is derived from 'Gallus'. 'Watteau' stands for 'Gateau', as 'William' does for 'Guillaume,' &c." In French, the surname is usually pronounced with the voiced labiodental fricative [v], though in Hainaut, the pronunciation with the voiced labio-velar approximant [w] is present. Various spelling of the surname notably include Wateau, Watau, Vuateau, Vateau, and Vatteau.) was born in October 1684 (Note: It is generally agreed that Watteau was the Jean-Antoine Watteau baptised on 10 October 1684, in Valenciennes at the Eglise de Saint-Jacques. However, it has been suggested by Michel Vangheluwe in 1984 that the painter could be the Antoine Watteau born on 6 May 1676, eight years before the traditional date.) in Valenciennes, once an important town in the County of Hainaut which became sequently part of the Burgundian and Habsburg Netherlands until its secession to France following the Franco-Dutch War. He was the second of four sons born to Jean-Philippe Watteau (1660–1720) and Michelle Lardenois (1653–1727), (Note: Jean-Philippe Watteau and Michelle Lardenois, married on 7 January 1681, had four sons: Jean-François (b. 1682), Jean-Antoine, Antoine Roch (1687–1689), and Noël Joseph (1689–1758).) and was presumed to be of Walloon descent. (Note: Contemporary authors disputed if Watteau could be considered as a Frenchman, given his origin from a recently seized region. In The Temple of Taste, Voltaire described Watteau as a Flemish artist; similarly, Frederick the Great labeled Watteau and Nicolas Lancret as "French painters of the school of Brabant" in a letter to his sister, the Margravine of Brandenburg-Bayreuth. Nonetheless, later authors, such as Karl Woermann and René Huyghe, define Watteau as a Walloon.) The Watteaus were a quite well-to-do family, although Jean-Philippe, a roofer in second generation, was said to be given to brawling. (Note: At least one case of such behavior was documented; in 1690, Jean-Philippe Watteau was charged of having broken the leg to Abraham Lesne, burgher.) Showing an early interest in painting, Jean-Antoine may have been apprenticed to Jacques-Albert Gérin, a local painter, and his first artistic subjects were charlatans selling quack remedies on the streets of Valenciennes. Watteau left for Paris in 1702. After a period spent as a scene-painter, and in poor health, he found employment in a workshop at Pont Notre-Dame, making copies of popular genre paintings in the Flemish and Dutch tradition; (Note: For further discussion of Watteau's early years in Paris, see Glorieux, Guillaume (2002). "Les débuts de Watteau à Paris: le pont Notre-Dame en 1702". Gazette des Beaux-Arts. 139: 251–262. OCLC 887046528.) it was in that period that he developed his characteristic sketchlike technique.

His drawings attracted the attention of the painter Claude Gillot, and by 1705 he was employed as an assistant to Gillot, whose work, influenced by those of Francesco Primaticcio and the school of Fontainebleau, represented a reaction against the official art of Louis XIV's reign. In Gillot's studio, Watteau became acquainted with the characters of the commedia dell'arte (which moved onto the théâtre de la foire following the Comédie-Italienne's departure in 1697), a favorite subject of Gillot's that would become one of Watteau's lifelong passions.

After a quarrel with Gillot, Watteau moved to the workshop of Claude Audran III, an interior decorator, under whose influence he began to make drawings admired for their consummate elegance. Audran was the curator of the Palais du Luxembourg, and from him Watteau acquired his knowledge of decorative art and ornamental design. At the palace, Watteau was able to see the series of canvases painted by Peter Paul Rubens for Queen Marie de Medici. The Flemish painter would become one of his major influences, together with the Venetian masters that he would later study in the collection of his patron and friend, the banker Pierre Crozat.

During this period Watteau painted The Departing Regiment, the first picture in his second and more personal manner, showing influence of Rubens, and the first of a long series of camp pictures. He showed the painting to Audran, who made light of it, and advised him not to waste his time and gifts on such subjects. Watteau determined to leave him, advancing as excuse his desire to return to Valenciennes. He found a purchaser, at the modest price of 60 livres, in a man called Sirois, the father-in-law of his later friend and patron Edme-François Gersaint, and was thus enabled to return to the home of his childhood. In Valenciennes he painted a number of the small camp-pieces, notably the Camp-Fire, which was again bought by Sirois, the price this time being raised to 200 livres.

== Later career ==
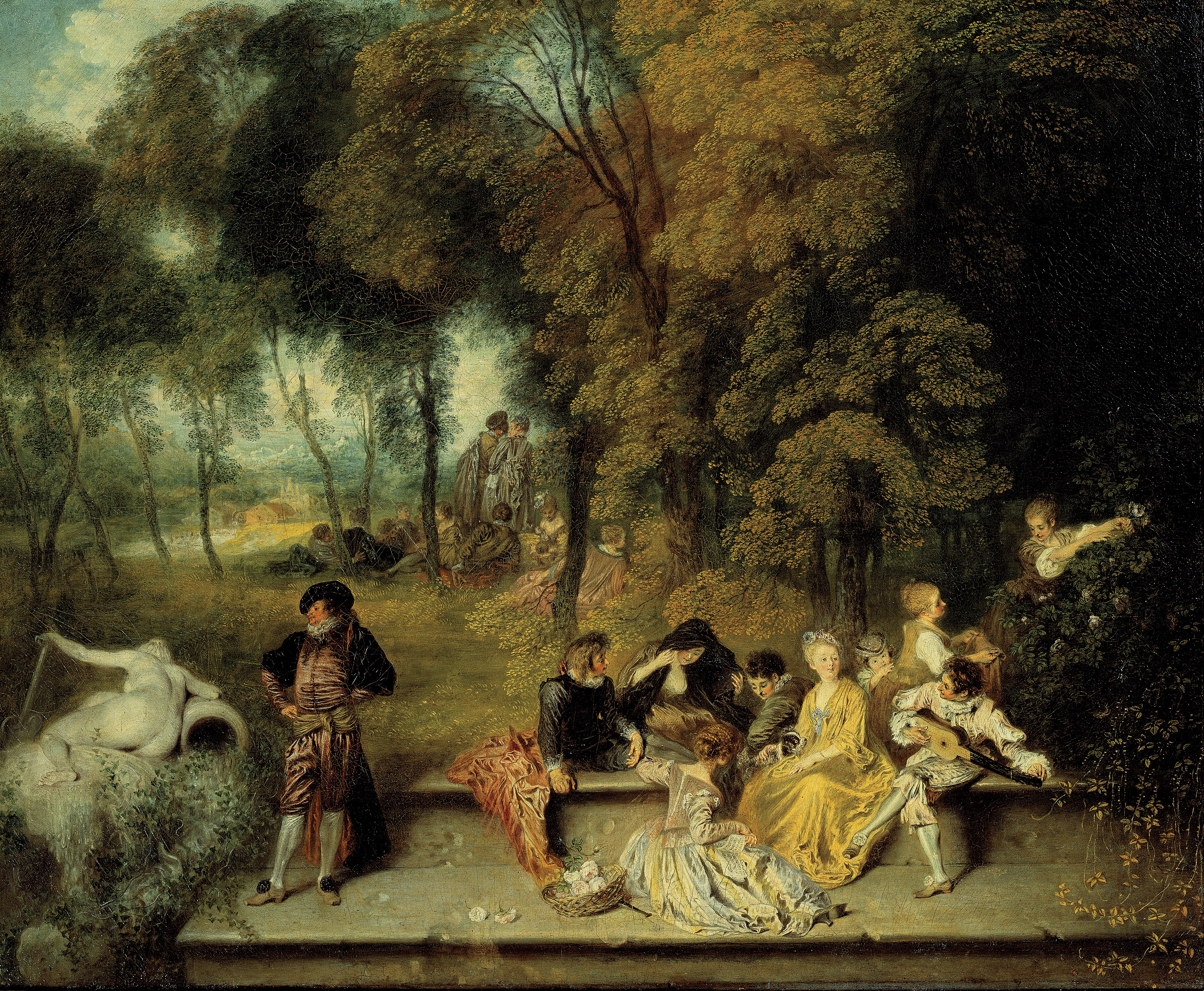
Pleasures of Love (1718–1719)

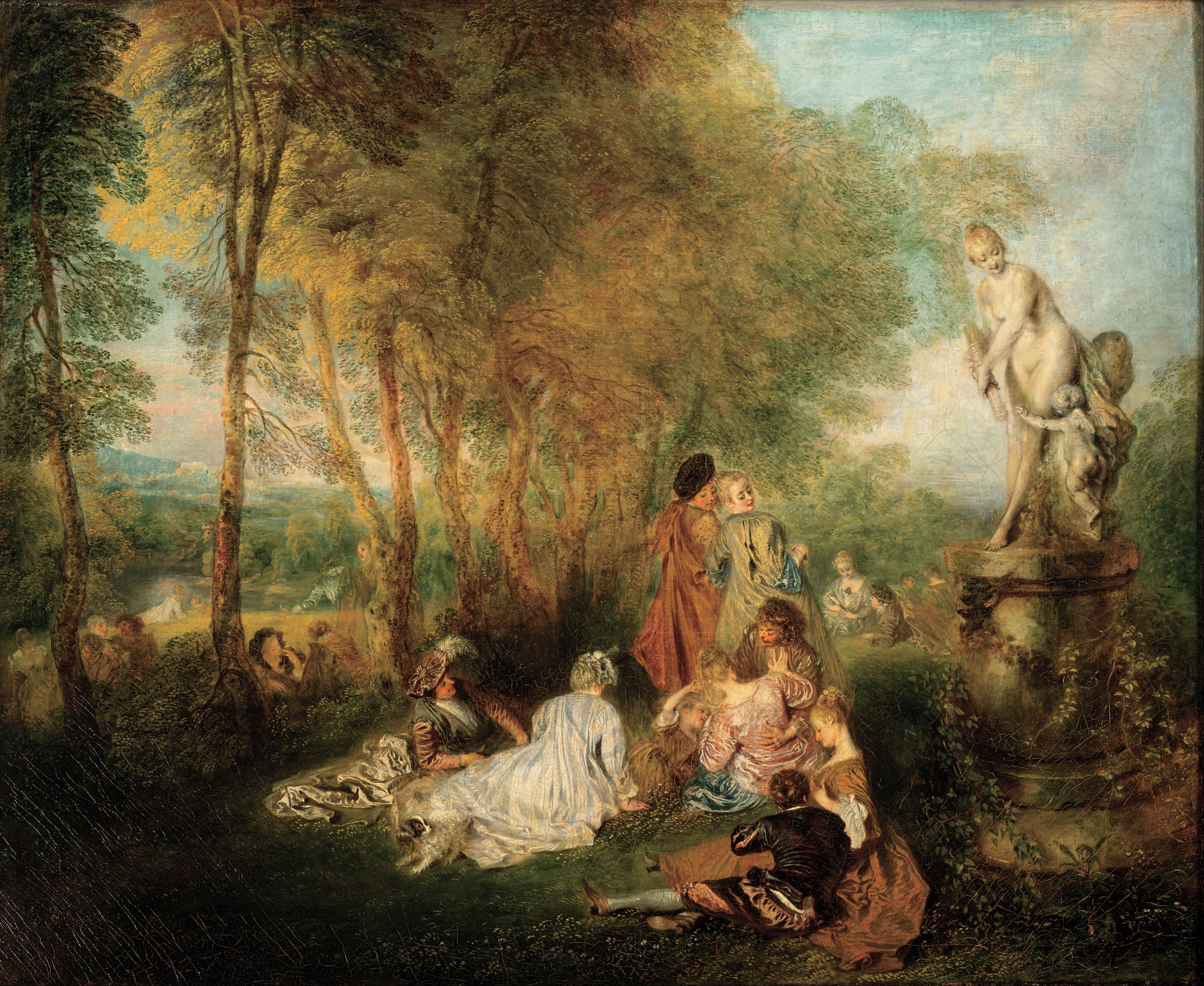
The Feast (or Festival) of Love (1718–1719)

The Embarkation for Cythera, 1717, Louvre. Many commentators note that it depicts a departure from the island of Cythera, the birthplace of Venus, thus symbolizing the brevity of love.

In 1709, Watteau tried to obtain a stay in Rome by winning the Prix de Rome from the Academy, but was awarded second place. In 1712 he tried and failed again, and was persuaded by Charles de La Fosse that he had nothing to learn from going to Rome; thanks to Fosse he was accepted as an associate member of the Academy in 1712 and a full member in 1717. He took those five years to deliver the required "reception piece", one of his masterpieces: the Pilgrimage to Cythera, also called the Embarkation for Cythera.

Watteau then went to live with the collector Pierre Crozat, who eventually on his death in 1740 left around 400 paintings and 19,000 drawings by the masters. Thus Watteau was able to spend even more time becoming familiar with the works of Rubens and the Venetian masters. He lacked aristocratic patrons; his buyers were bourgeois such as bankers and dealers. Among his most famous paintings, beside the two versions of the Pilgrimage to Cythera, one in the Louvre, the other in the Schloss Charlottenburg, Berlin, are Pierrot (long identified as "Gilles"), Fêtes venitiennes, Love in the Italian Theater, Love in the French Theater, "Voulez-vous triompher des belles?" and Mezzetin. The subject of his hallmark painting, Pierrot (Gilles), is an actor in a white satin costume who stands isolated from his four companions, staring ahead with an enigmatic expression on his face.

Watteau's final masterpiece, the Shop-sign of Gersaint, exits the pastoral forest locale for a mundane urban set of encounters. Painted at Watteau's own insistence, "in eight days, working only in the mornings ... in order to warm up his fingers", this sign for the shop in Paris of the paintings dealer Edme François Gersaint is effectively the final curtain of Watteau's theatre. It has been compared with Las Meninas as a meditation on art and illusion. The scene is an art gallery where the façade has magically vanished, and the gallery and street in the canvas are fused into one contiguous drama.

Watteau alarmed his friends by a carelessness about his future and financial security, as if foreseeing he would not live for long. In fact he had been sickly and physically fragile since childhood. In 1720, he travelled to London, England, to consult Dr. Richard Mead, one of the most fashionable physicians of his time and an admirer of Watteau's work. However, London's damp and smoky air offset any benefits of Dr. Mead's wholesome food and medicines. Watteau returned to France, spending six months with Gersaint, and then spent his last few months on the estate of his patron, Abbé Haranger, where he died in 1721, perhaps from tuberculous laryngitis, at the age of 36. The Abbé said Watteau was semi-conscious and mute during his final days, clutching a paint brush and painting imaginary paintings in the air.

His nephew, Louis Joseph Watteau, son of Antoine's brother Noël Joseph Watteau (1689–1756), and grand nephew, François-Louis-Joseph Watteau, son of Louis, followed Antoine into painting.

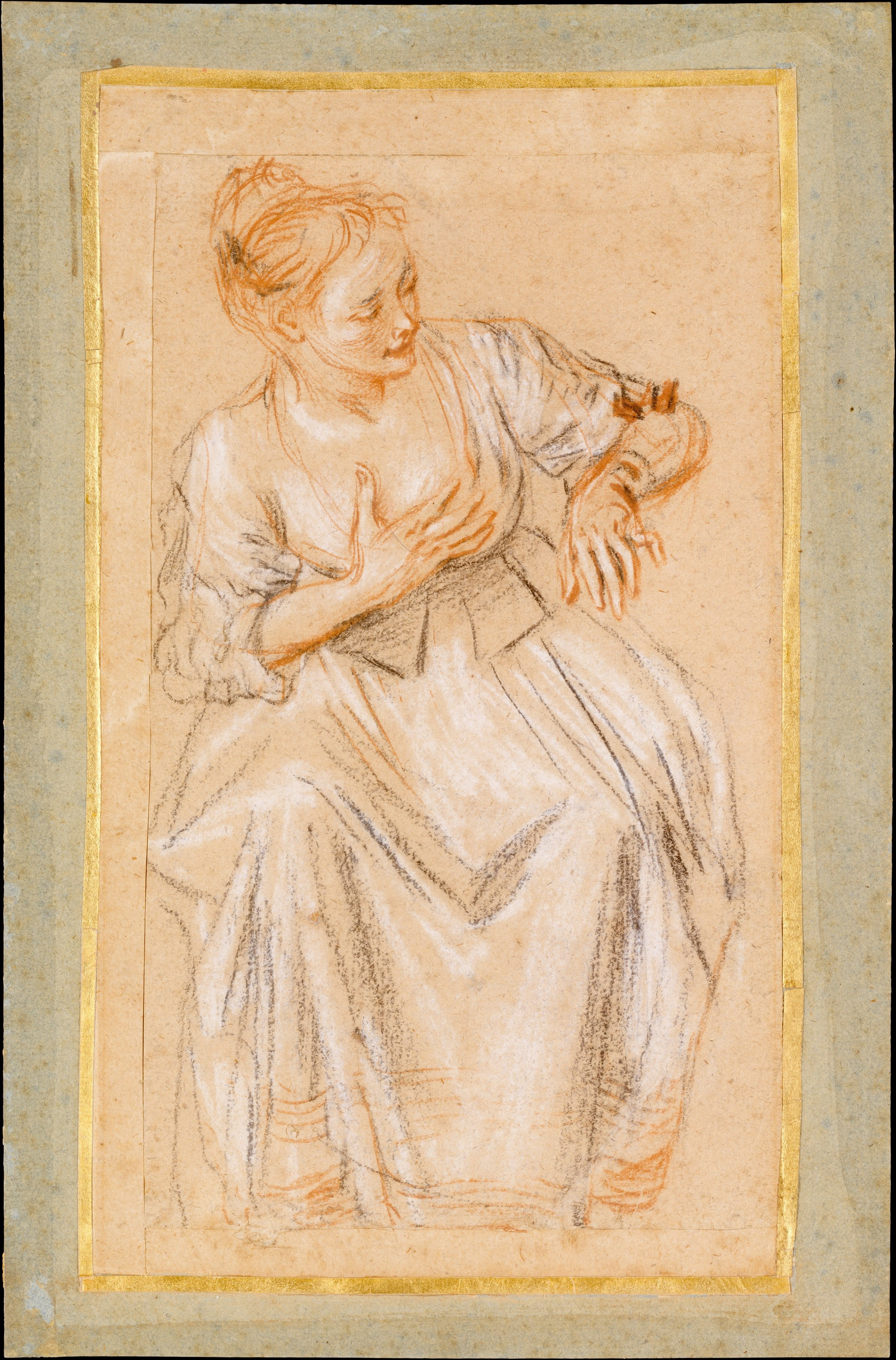
Seated Woman (1716/1717), drawing by Watteau

== Critical assessment and legacy ==
Little known during his lifetime beyond a small circle of his devotees, Watteau "was mentioned but seldom in contemporary art criticism and then usually reprovingly". Sir Michael Levey once noted that Watteau "created, unwittingly, the concept of the individualistic artist loyal to himself, and himself alone". If his immediate followers, Lancret and Pater, would depict the unabashed frillery of aristocratic romantic pursuits, Watteau in a few masterpieces anticipates an art about art, the world of art as seen through the eyes of an artist. In contrast to the Rococo whimsicality and licentiousness cultivated by Boucher and Fragonard in the later part of Louis XV's reign, Watteau's theatrical panache is usually tinged with a note of sympathy, wistfulness, and sadness at the transience of love and other earthly delights. Famously, the Victorian essayist Walter Pater wrote of Watteau: "He was always a seeker after something in the world, that is there in no satisfying measure, or not at all."

Watteau was a prolific draftsman. His drawings, typically executed in trois crayons technique, were collected and admired even by those, such as count de Caylus or Gersaint, who found fault with his paintings. In 1726 and 1728, Jean de Jullienne published suites of etchings after Watteau's drawings, and in 1735 he published a series of engravings after his paintings, The Recueil Jullienne. The quality of the reproductions, using a mixture of engraving and etching following the practice of the Rubens engravers, varied according to the skill of the people employed by Jullienne, but was often very high. Such a comprehensive record was hitherto unparalleled. This helped disseminate his influence round Europe and into the decorative arts.

Watteau's influence on the arts (not only painting, but the decorative arts, costume, film, poetry, music) was more extensive than that of almost any other 18th-century artist. The Watteau dress, a long, sacklike dress with loose pleats hanging from the shoulder at the back, similar to those worn by many of the women in his paintings, is named after him. According to Konody's critical assessment in the Encyclopædia Britannica Eleventh Edition, in part, "in his treatment of the landscape background and of the atmospheric surroundings of the figures can be found the germs of Impressionism". His influence on later generations of painters may have been less apparent in France than in England, where J. M. W. Turner was among his admirers. A revived vogue for Watteau began in England during the British Regency, and was later encapsulated by the Goncourt brothers in France (Edmond de Goncourt having published a catalogue raisonné in 1875) and the World of Art union in Russia.

In 1984 Watteau societies were created in Paris, by Jean Ferré, and London, by Dr. Selby Whittingham. A major exhibition in Paris, Washington and Berlin commemorated the 1984 tercentenary of his birth. Since 2000 a Watteau centre has been established at Valenciennes by Professor Chris Rauseo. A catalogue raisonné of Watteau's drawings has been compiled by Pierre Rosenberg and Louis-Antoine Prat, replacing the one by Sir Karl Parker and Jacques Mathey; similar projects on his paintings are undertaken by Alan Wintermute and Martin Eidelberg, respectively.

From September 22–November 29, 2009, the Metropolitan Museum of Art exhibited Watteau, Music, and Theater in honor of Director Emeritus Philippe de Montebello. The exhibit displayed Watteau's paintings and drawings of the opera-ballet and theater, as well as musical instruments and porcelains. A catalog accompanied the exhibit. ISBN 978-0-300-15507-5

From July 12, 2016 to October 2, 2016, the Frick Collection exhibited Watteau's Soldiers: Scenes of Military Life in Eighteenth-Century France. The exhibit shows Watteau's focus “on the most prosaic aspects of war — marches, halts, and encampments. The resulting works show the quiet moments between the fighting, when soldiers could rest and daydream, smoke pipes and play cards.” The catalog was written by Aaron Wile ISBN 978-1-907-80479-3

From November 23, 2021–February 20, 2022, The J. Paul Getty Museum exhibited The Surprise: Watteau in the J. Paul Getty Museum, marking the 300th anniversary of Watteau's death and celebrating the Getty's acquisition of The Surprise.

From 16 October 2024–3 February 2025, the Louvre exhibited A new look at Watteau An actor with no lines: Pierrot, known as Gilles. The exhibit examined Gilles and the painting's influence on other artists. A catalog, Pierrot, dit Le Gilles, de Watteau. Un comédien sans réplique, by Guillaume Faroult (in French) accompanied the exhibit. ISBN 978-2-359-06447-6

== Gallery ==
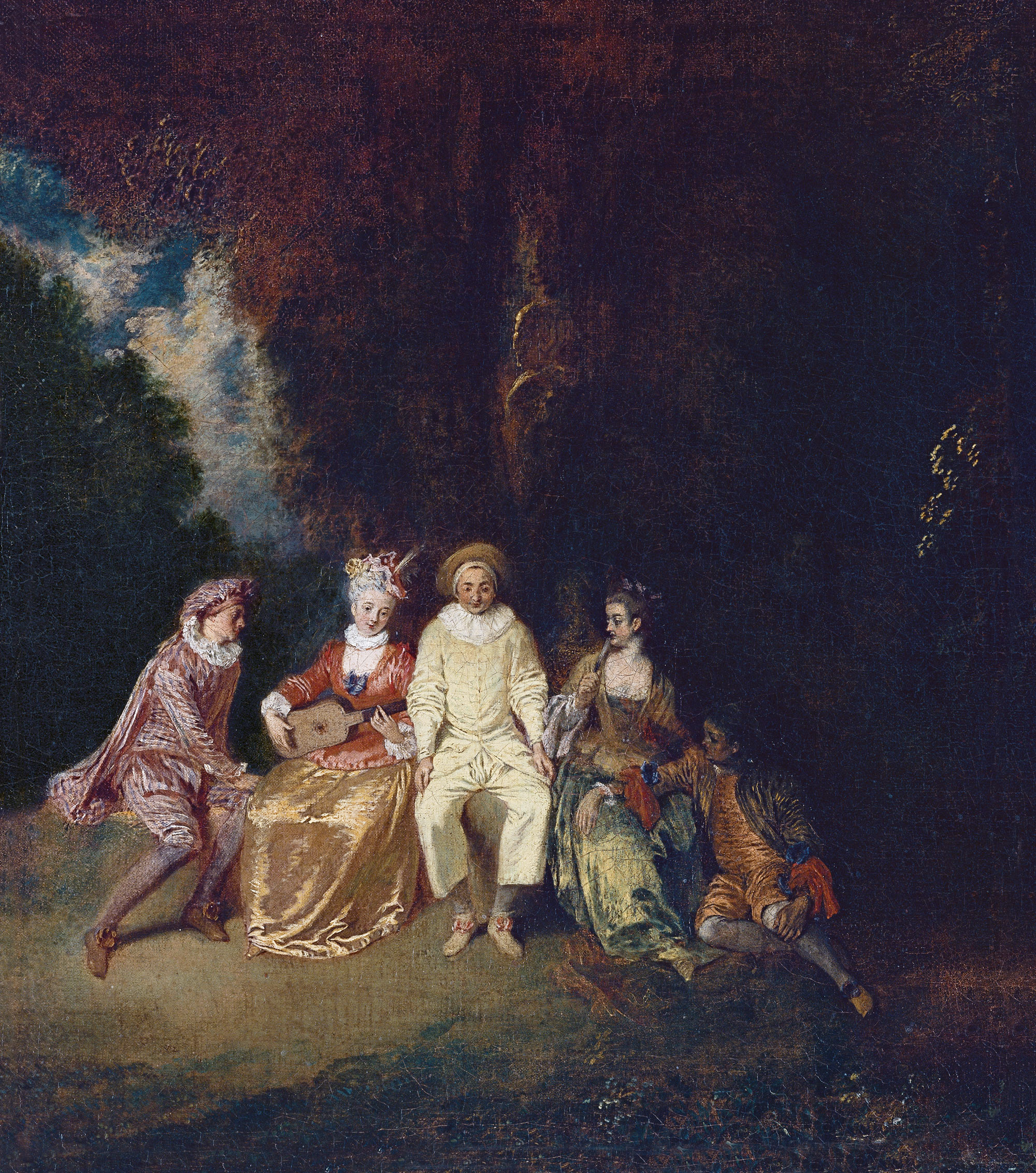
Pierrot Content, c. 1711–1712, Thyssen-Bornemisza Museum, Madrid.

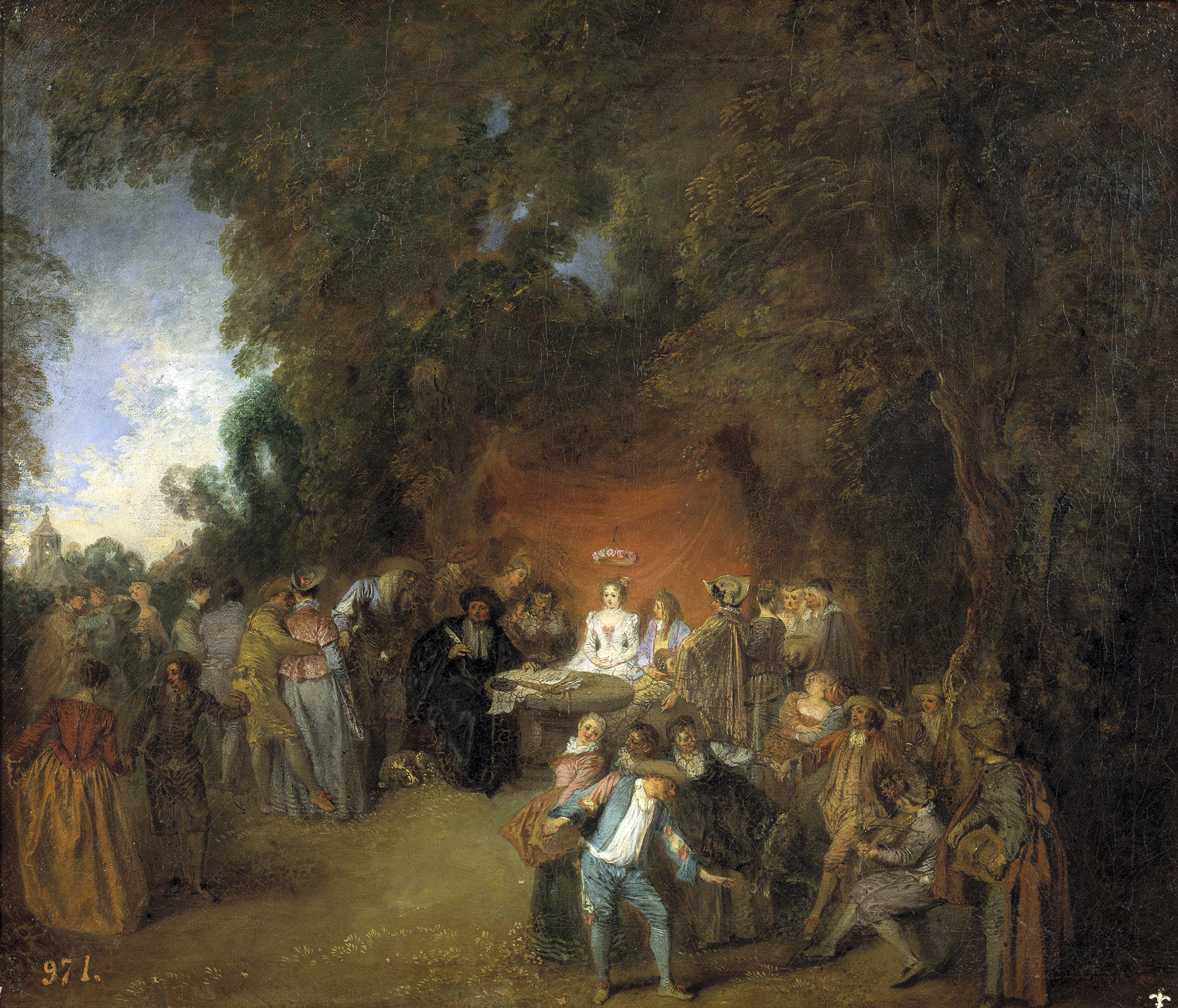
Marriage Contract and Country Dancing, c. 1711, Prado Museum, Madrid.

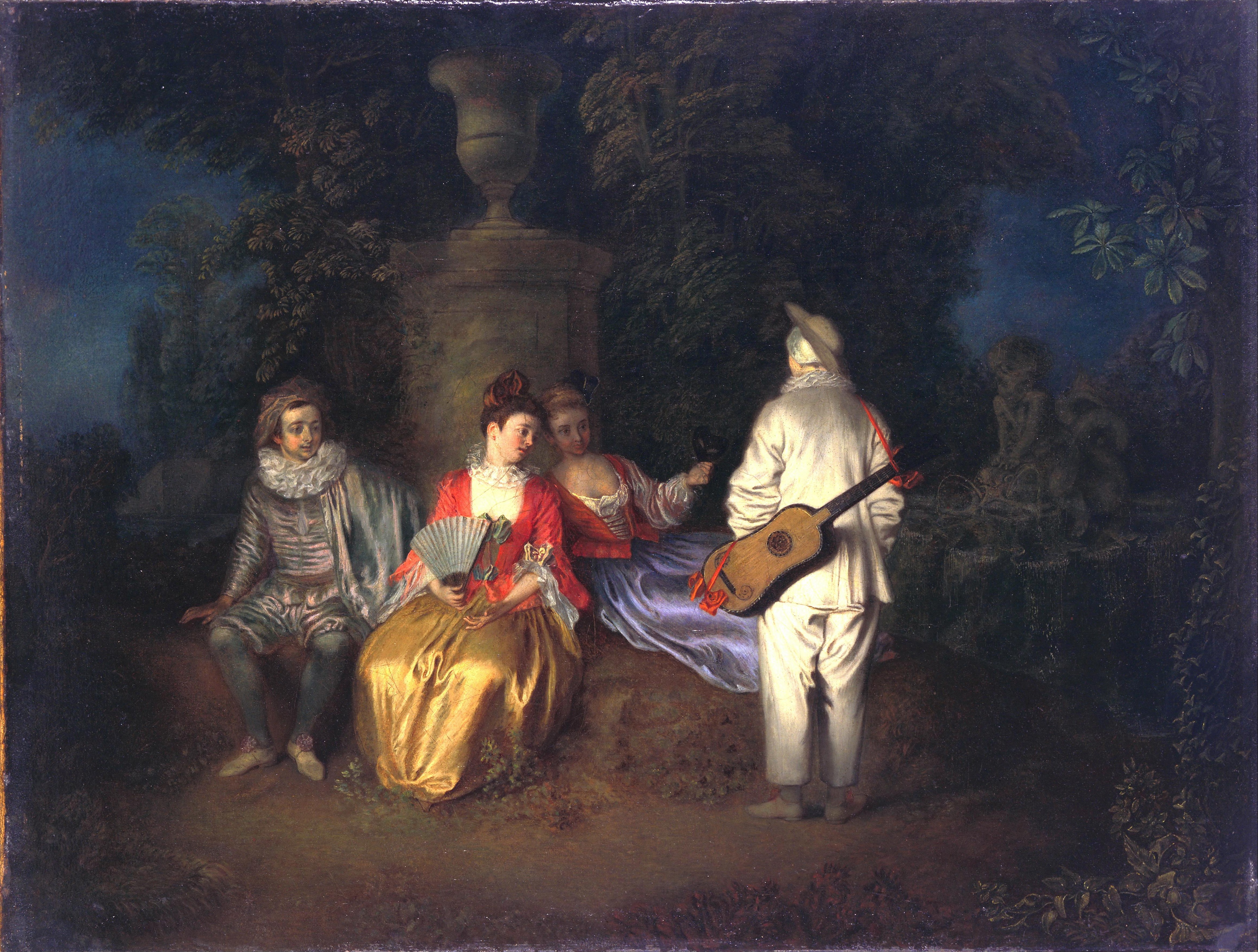
La Partie carrée (The Foursome), c. 1713, Legion of Honor, San Francisco

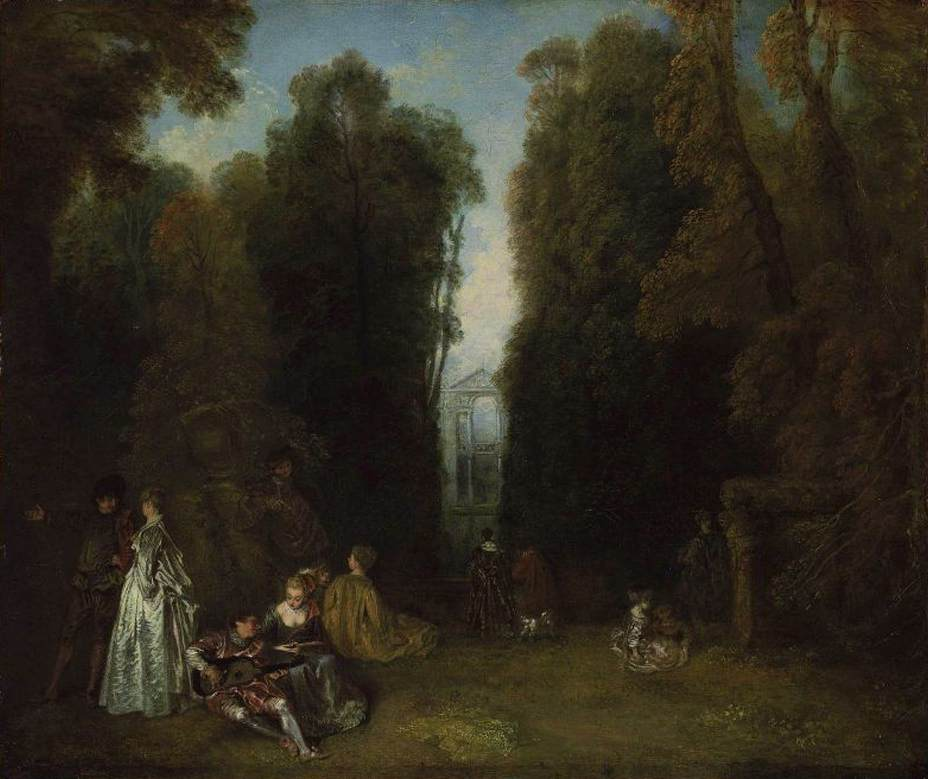
La Perspective (View through the Trees in the Park of Pierre Crozat), c. 1715, Museum of Fine Arts, Boston

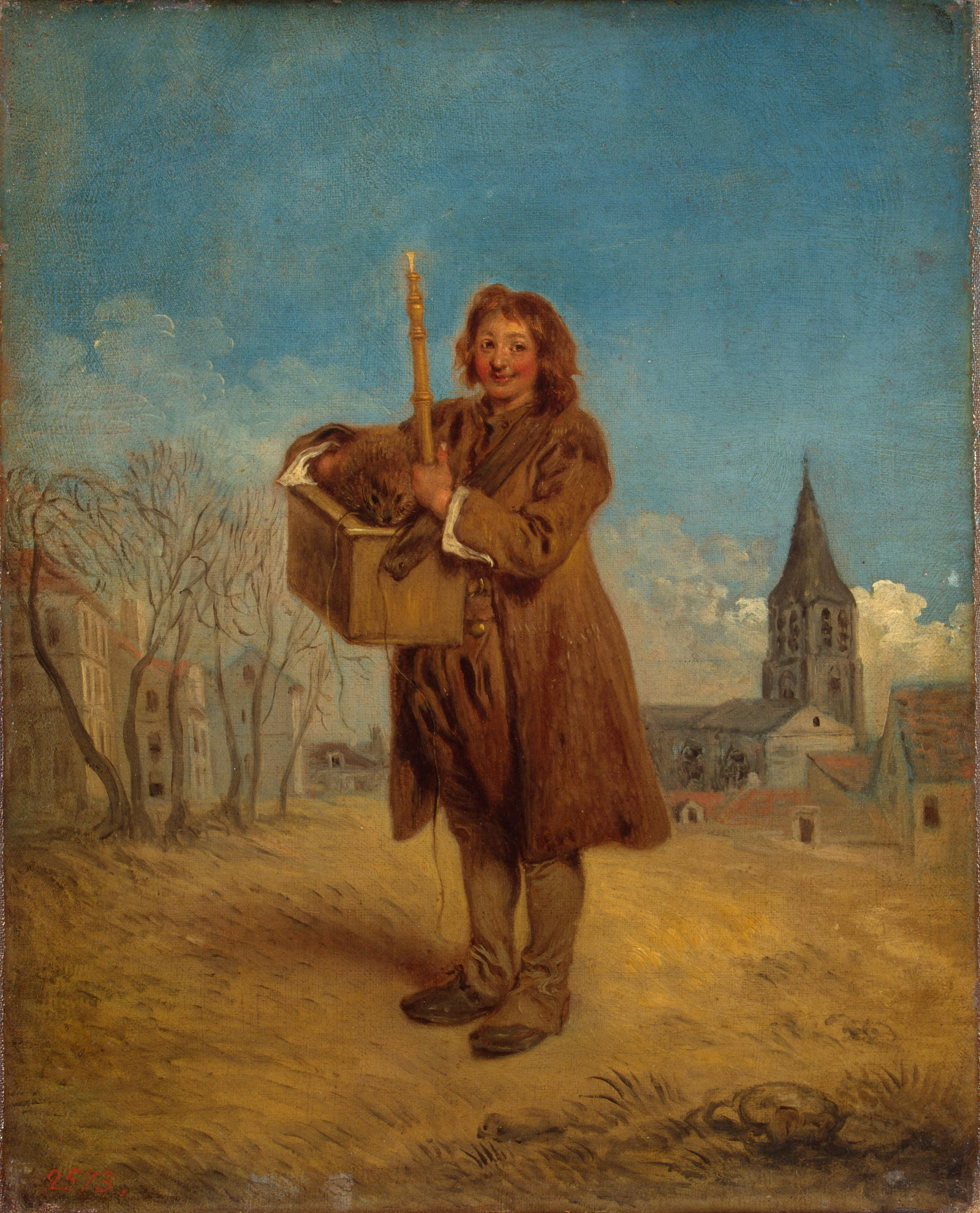
Savoyard with a Marmot, c. 1716, Hermitage Museum, St. Petersburg

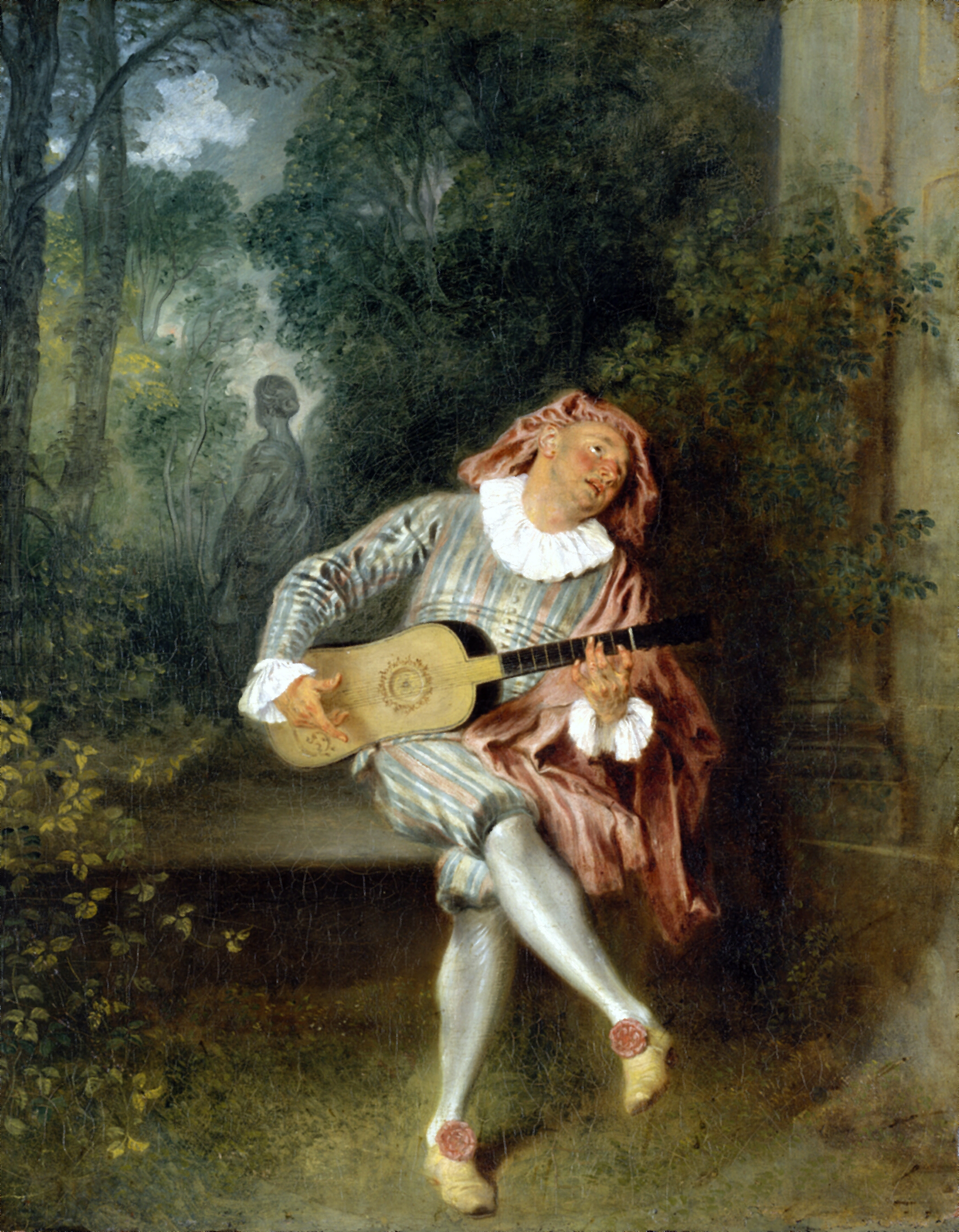
Mezzetino, c. 1717–1720, Metropolitan Museum of Art, New York

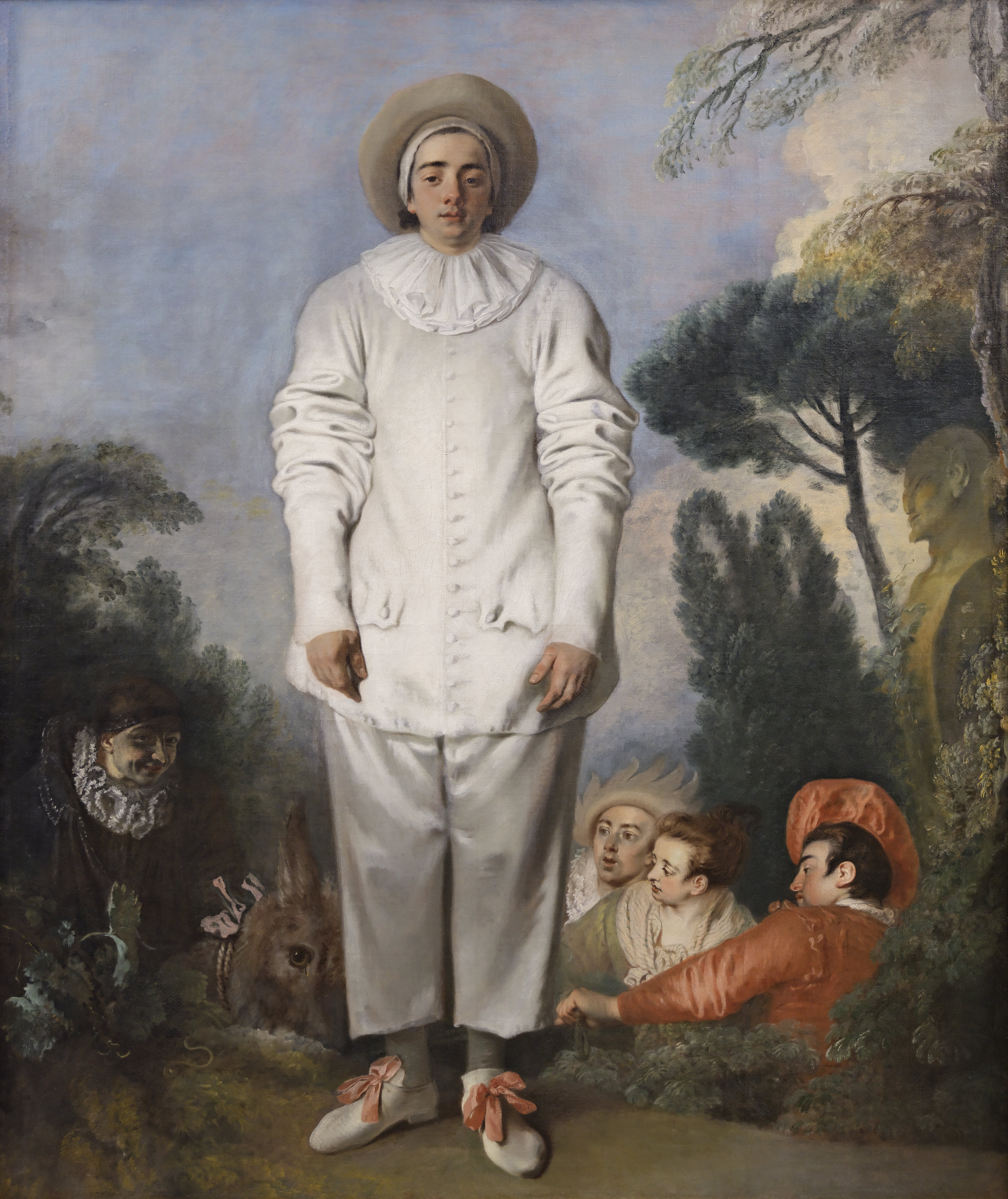
Pierrot, c. 1718–1719, Louvre, Paris

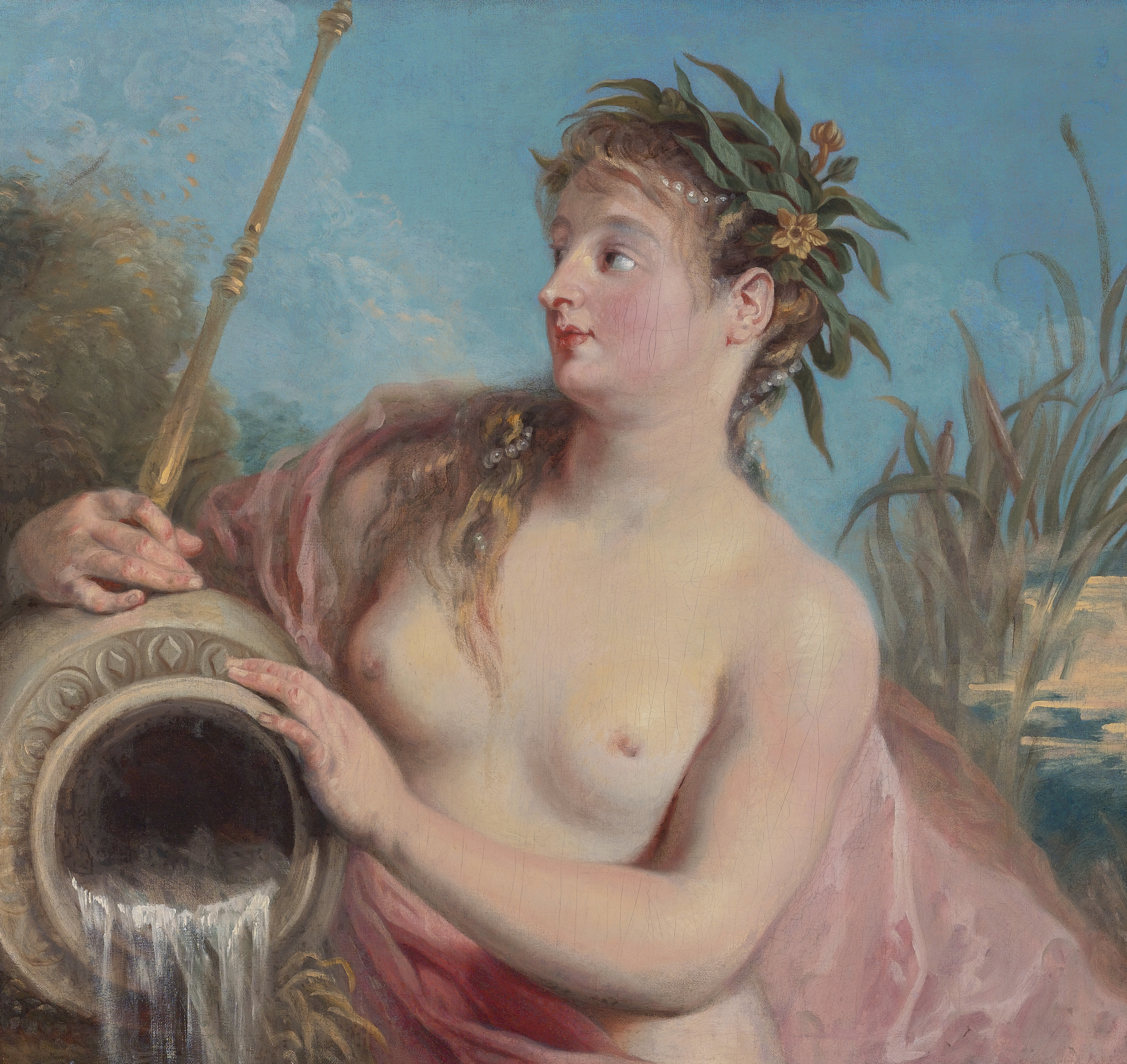
Quellnymphe, c. 1718, private collection

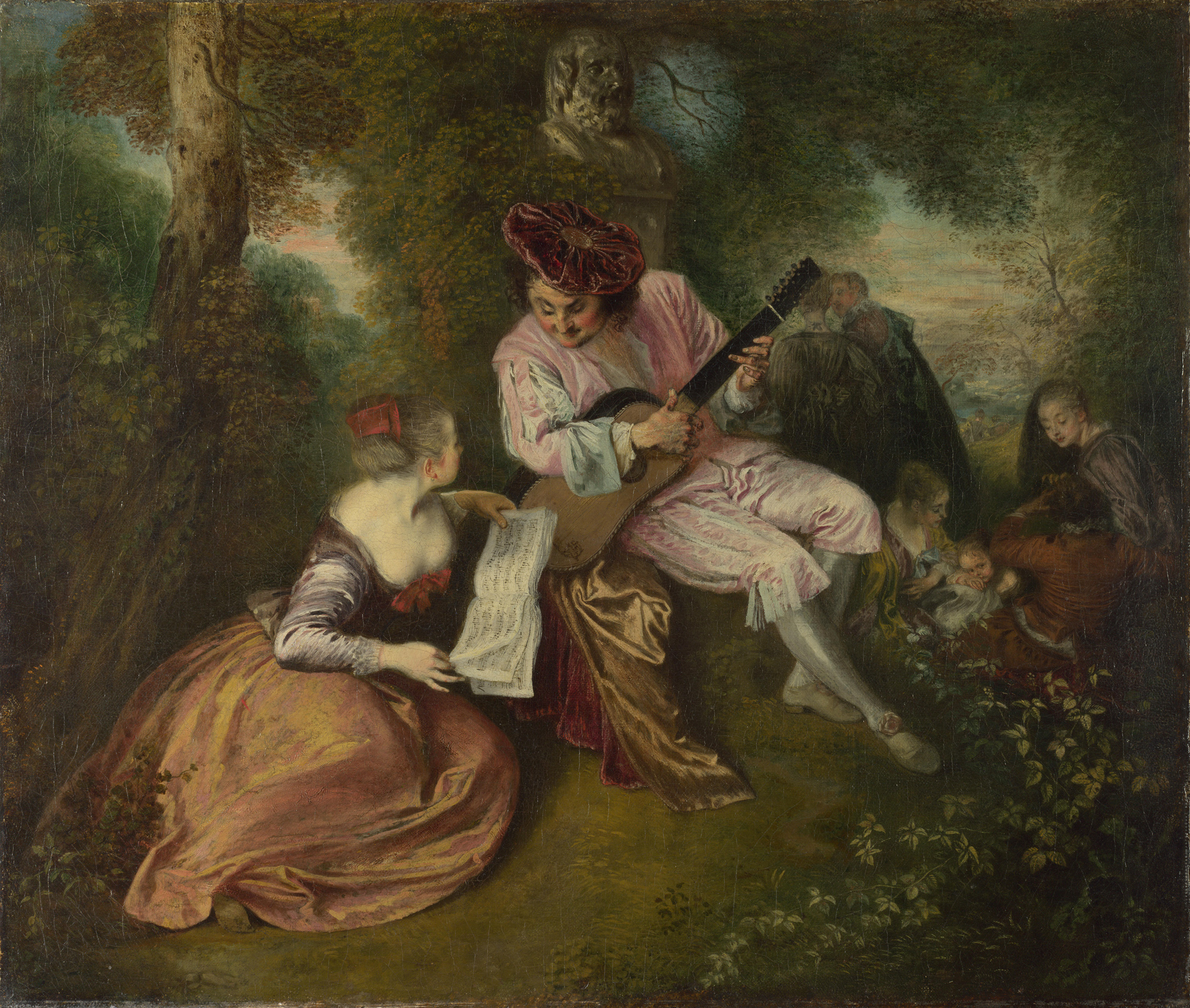
The Love Song, c. 1717, National Gallery, London

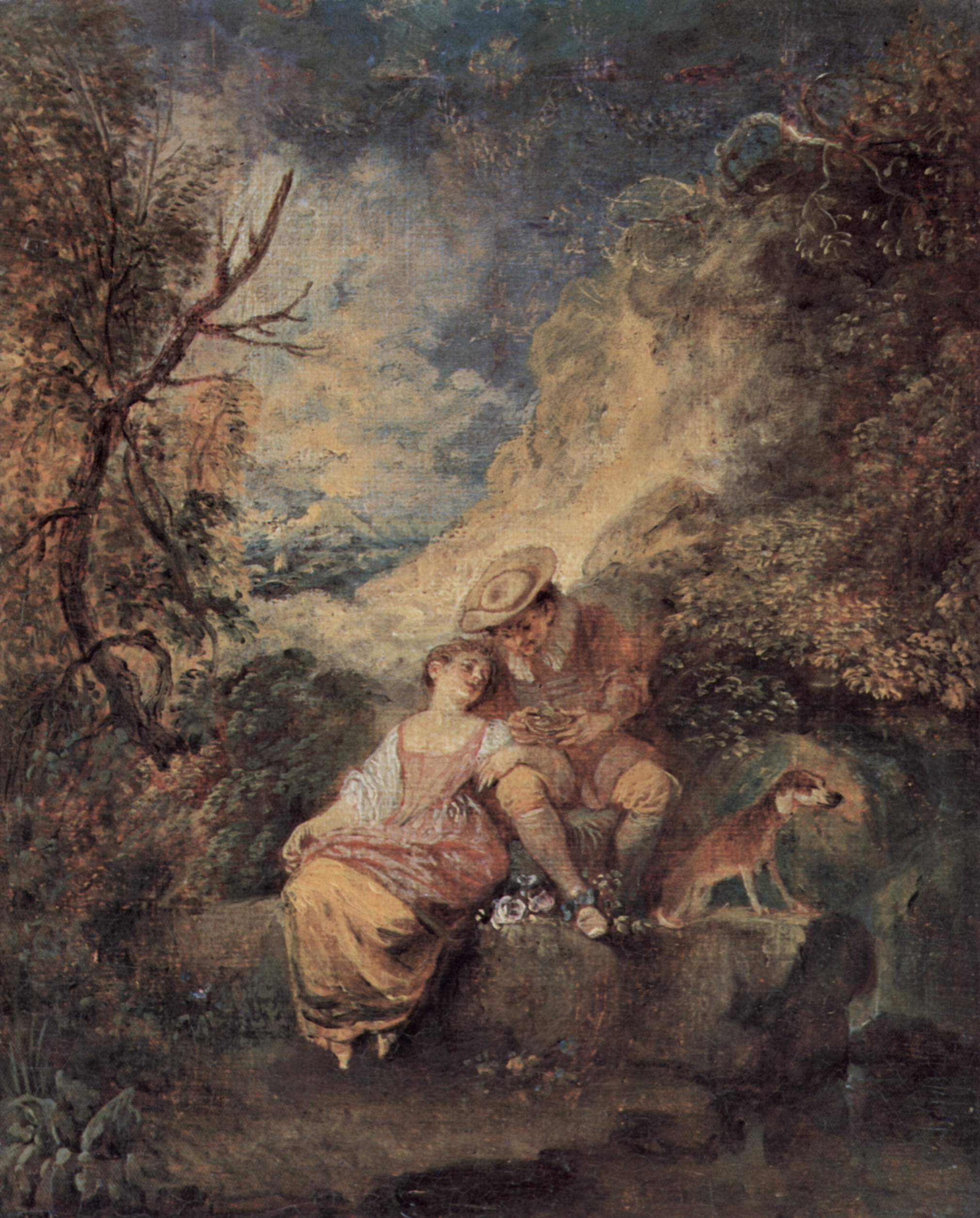
The Robber of the Sparrow's Nest, c. 1712, National Galleries of Scotland, Edinburgh

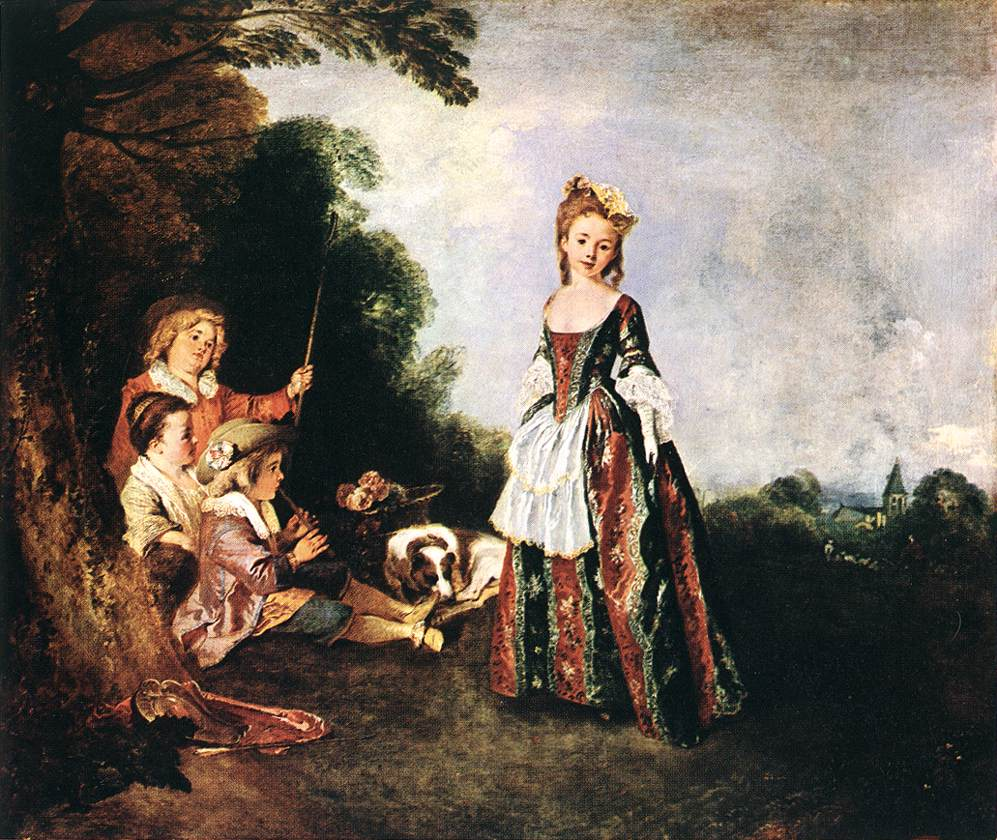
The Dance, c. 1716–1718, Gemäldegalerie, Berlin

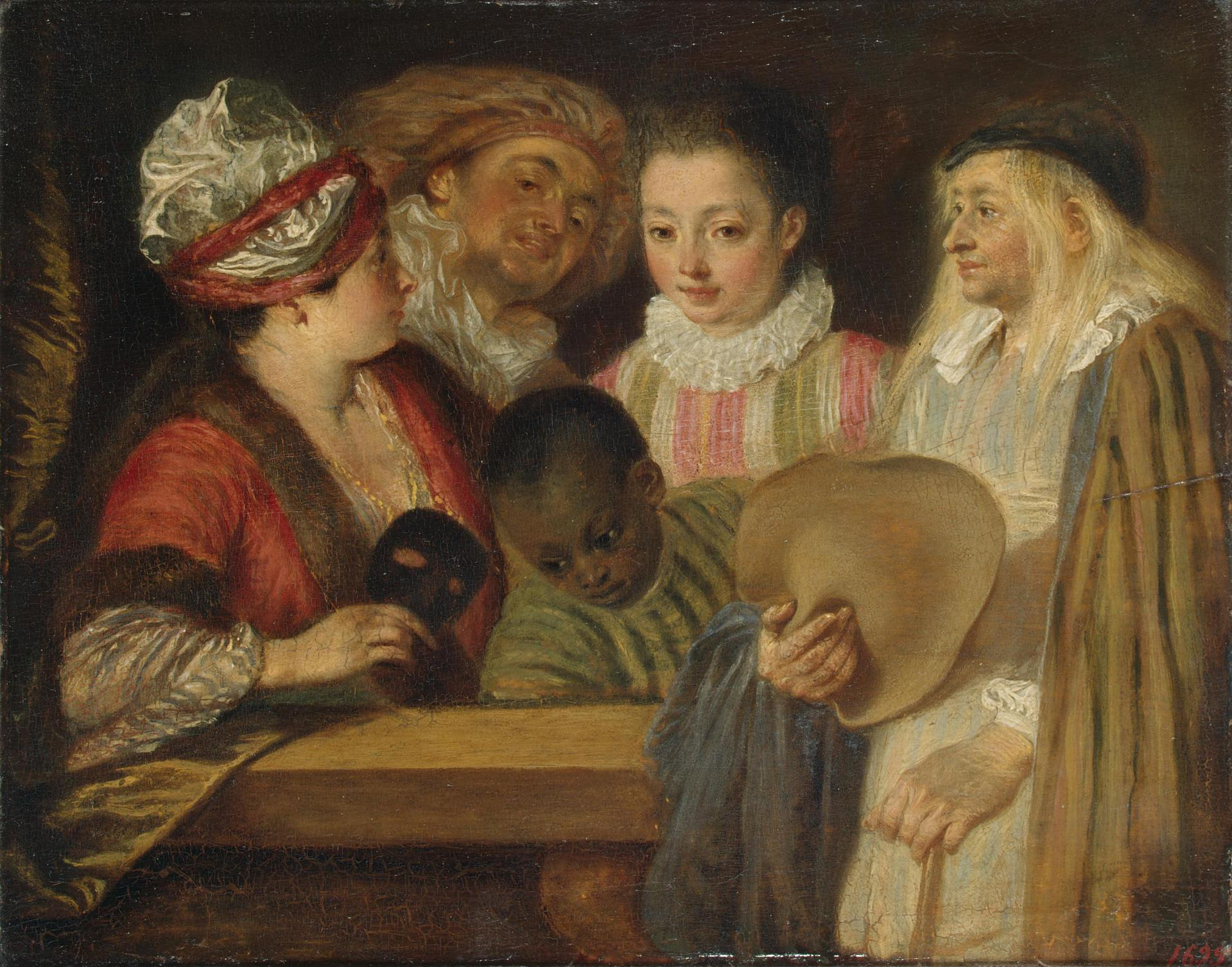
Actors of the Comédie-Française, between 1711 and 1718, Hermitage Museum, Saint Petersburg

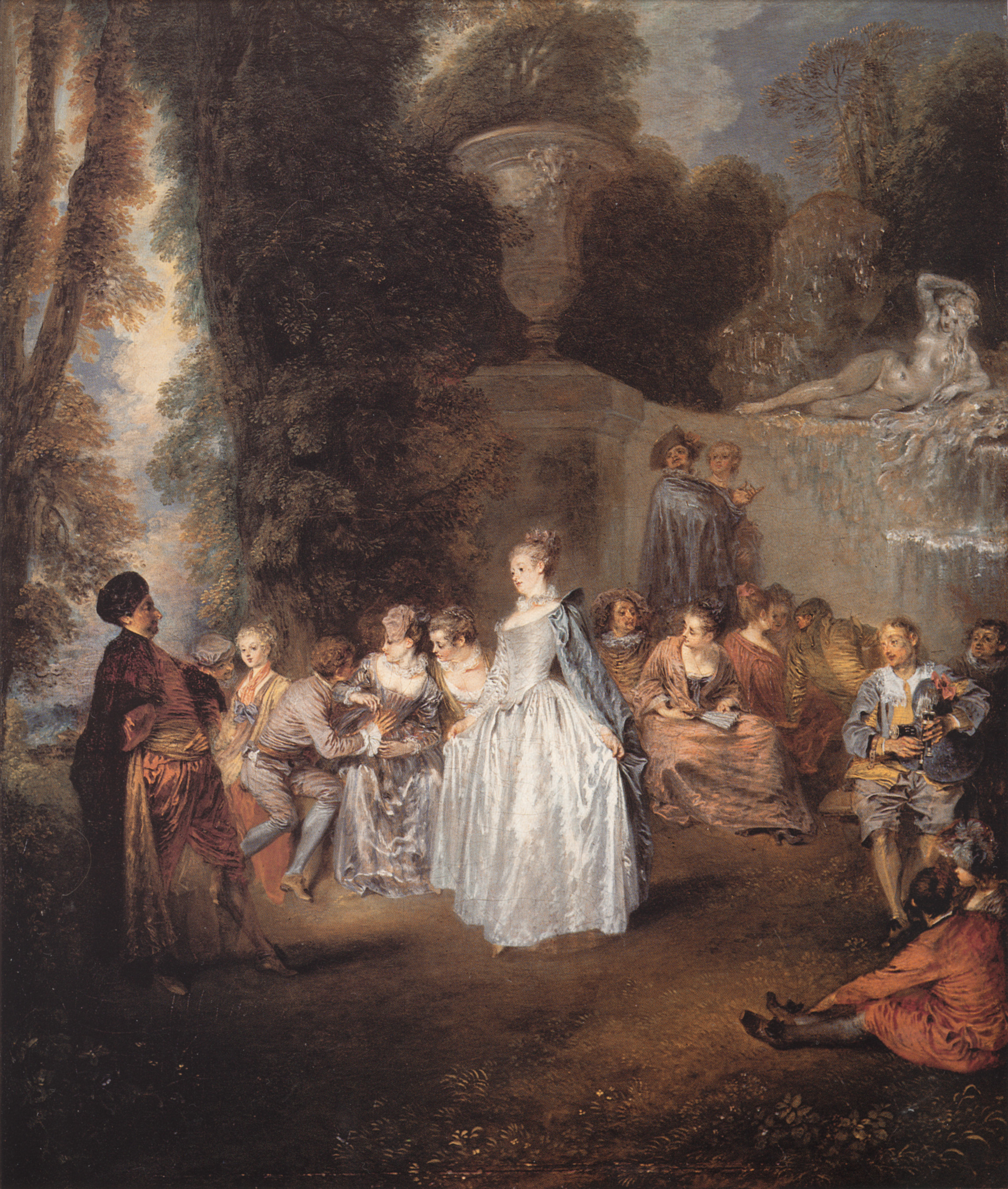
Fêtes Vénitiennes, c. 1718–1719, National Galleries of Scotland, Edinburgh

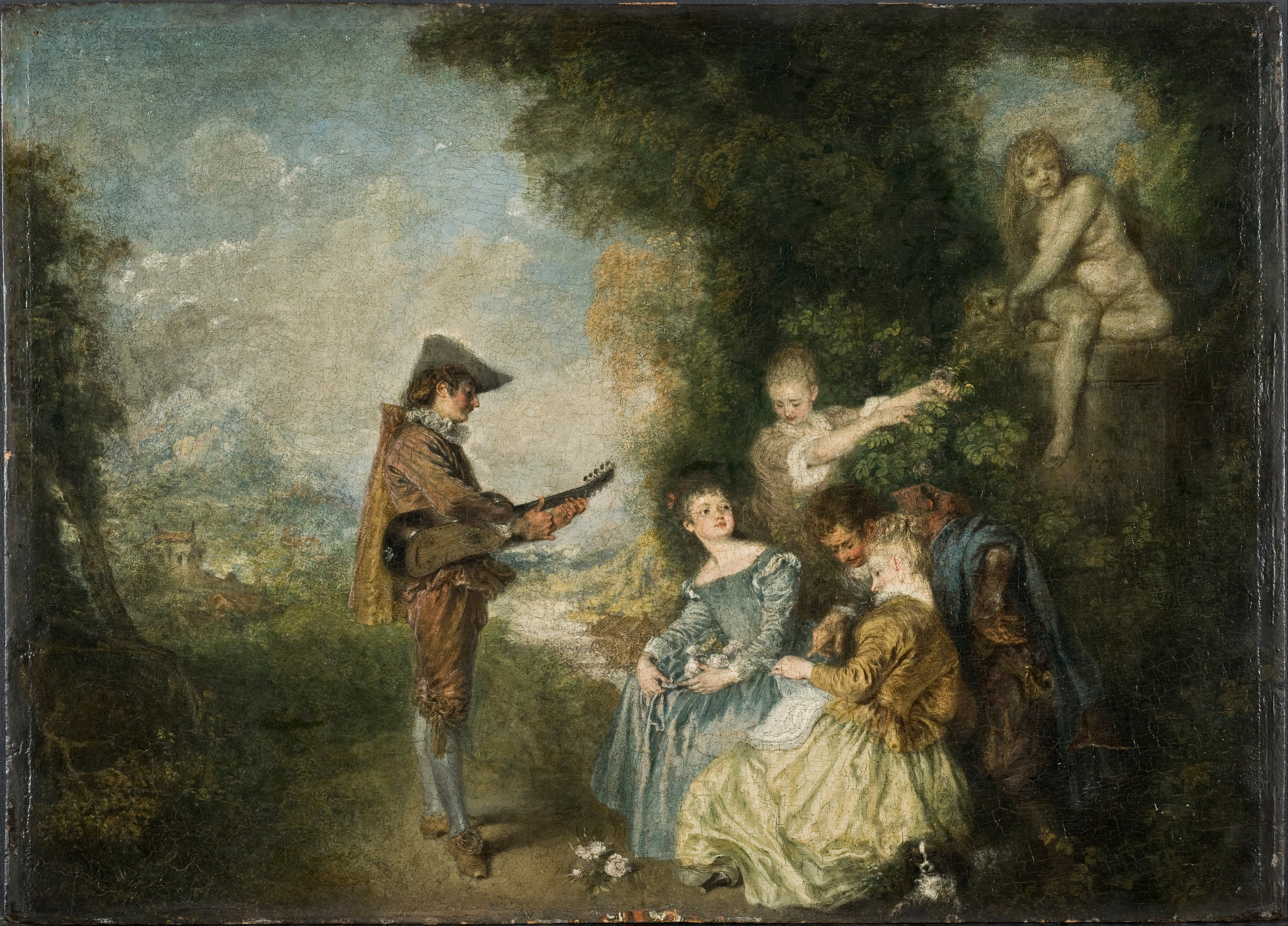
The Love Lesson, c. 1716–1717, Nationalmuseum, Stockholm

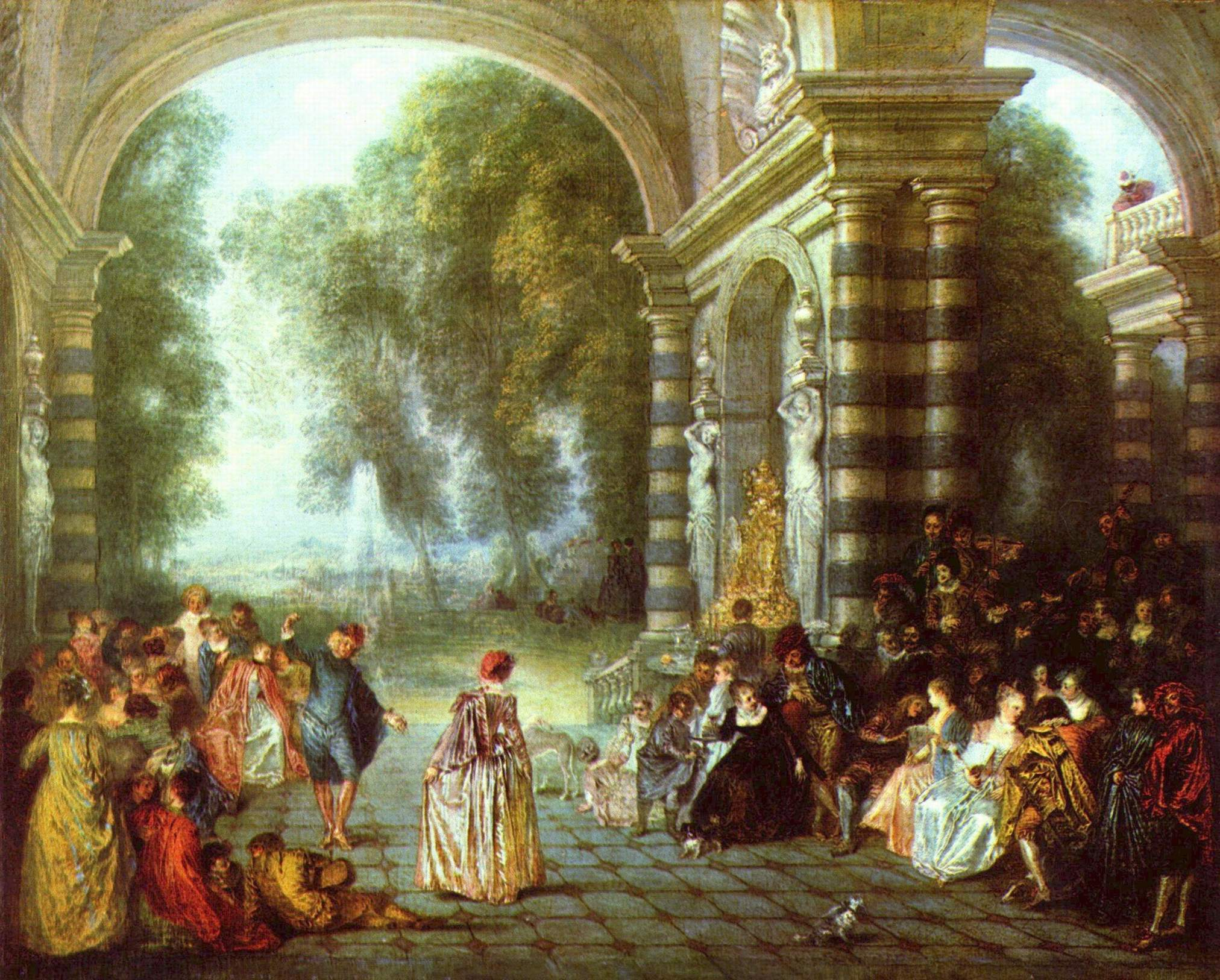
Les Plaisirs du Bal, c. 1717, Dulwich Picture Gallery, London

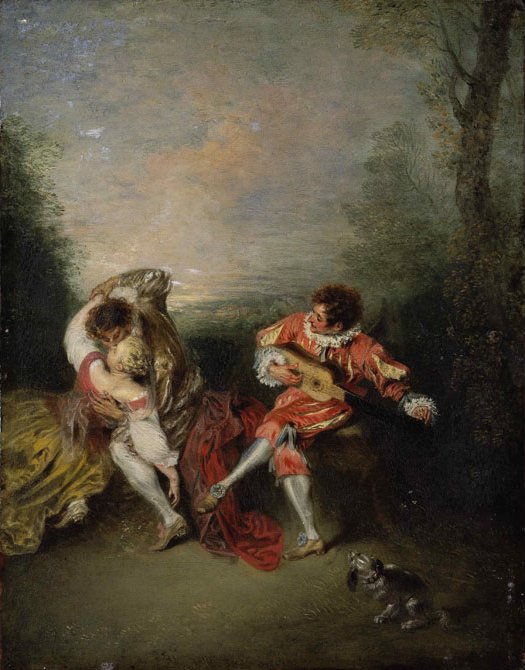
La Surprise, c. 1718, Getty Center, Los Angeles

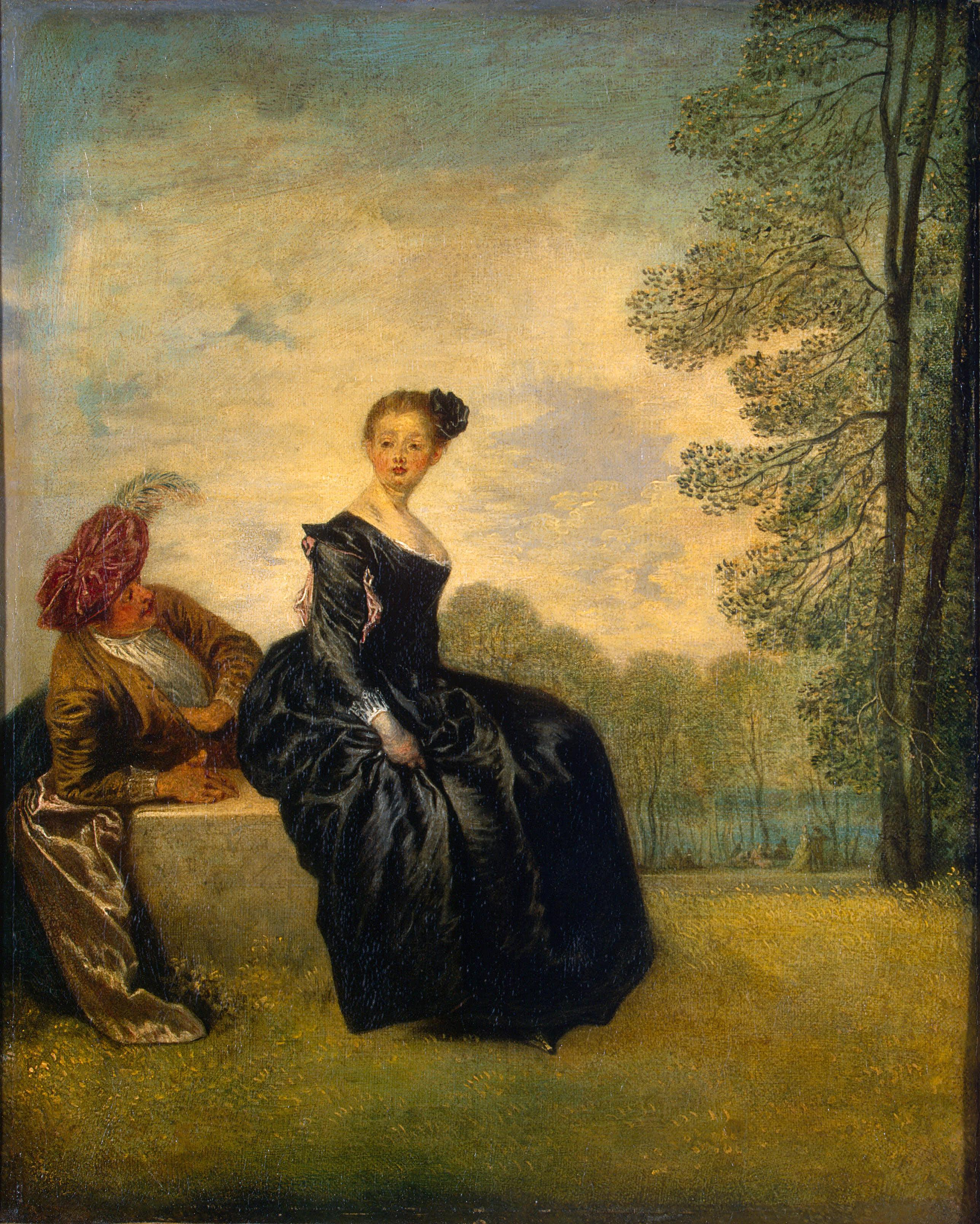
La Boudeuse, c. 1715–1718, Hermitage Museum, Saint Petersburg

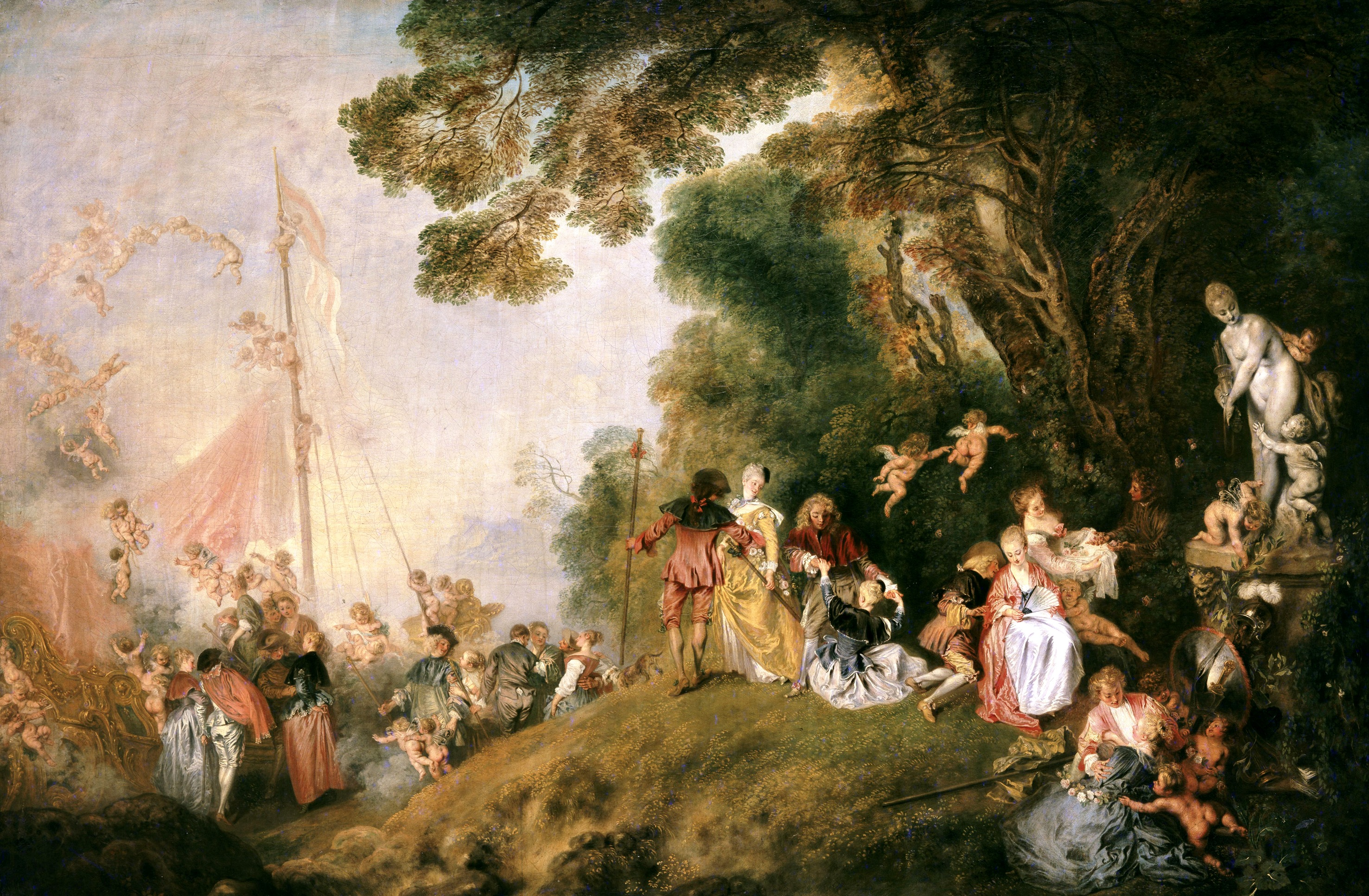
Pilgrimage to Cythera, c. 1718–1719, Charlottenburg Palace, Berlin

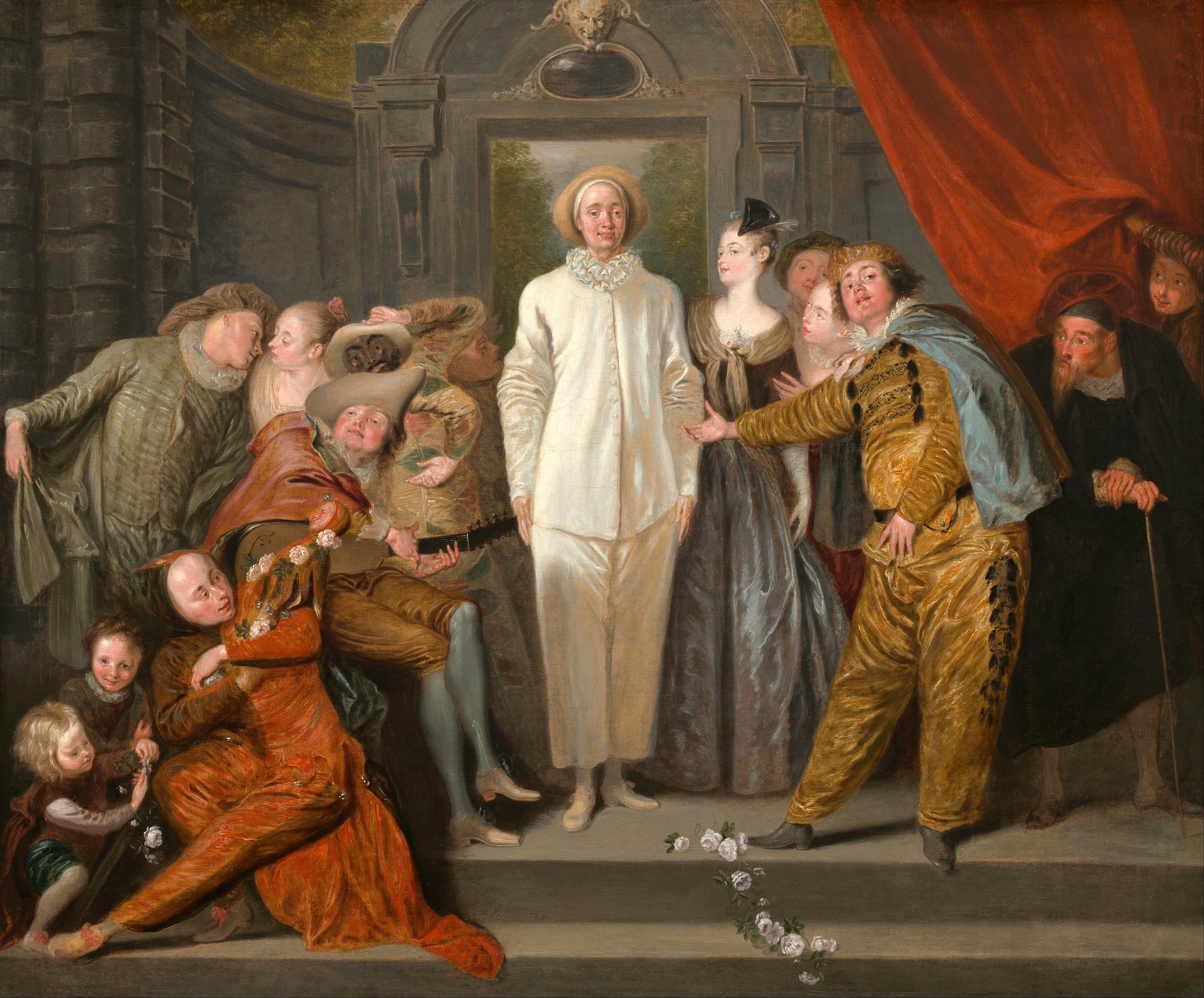
The Italian Comedians, c. 1719–1721, National Gallery of Art, Washington, D.C.

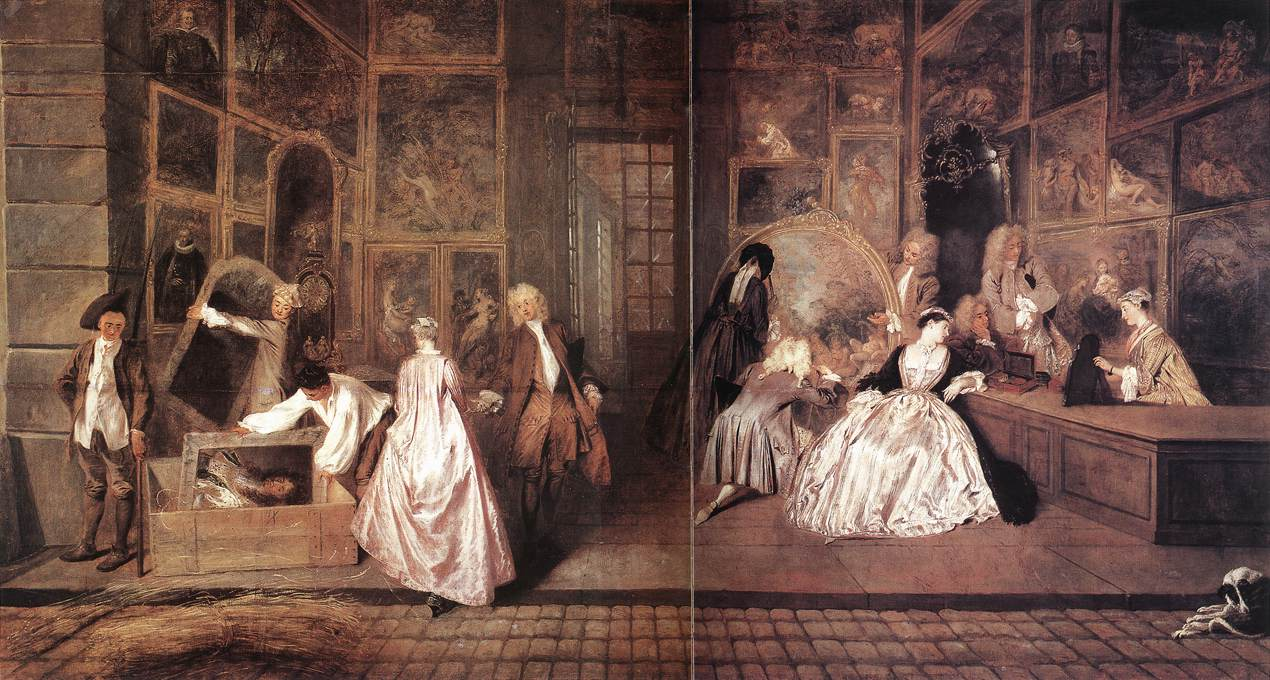
L'Enseigne de Gersaint, c. 1720–1721, Charlottenburg Palace, Berlin

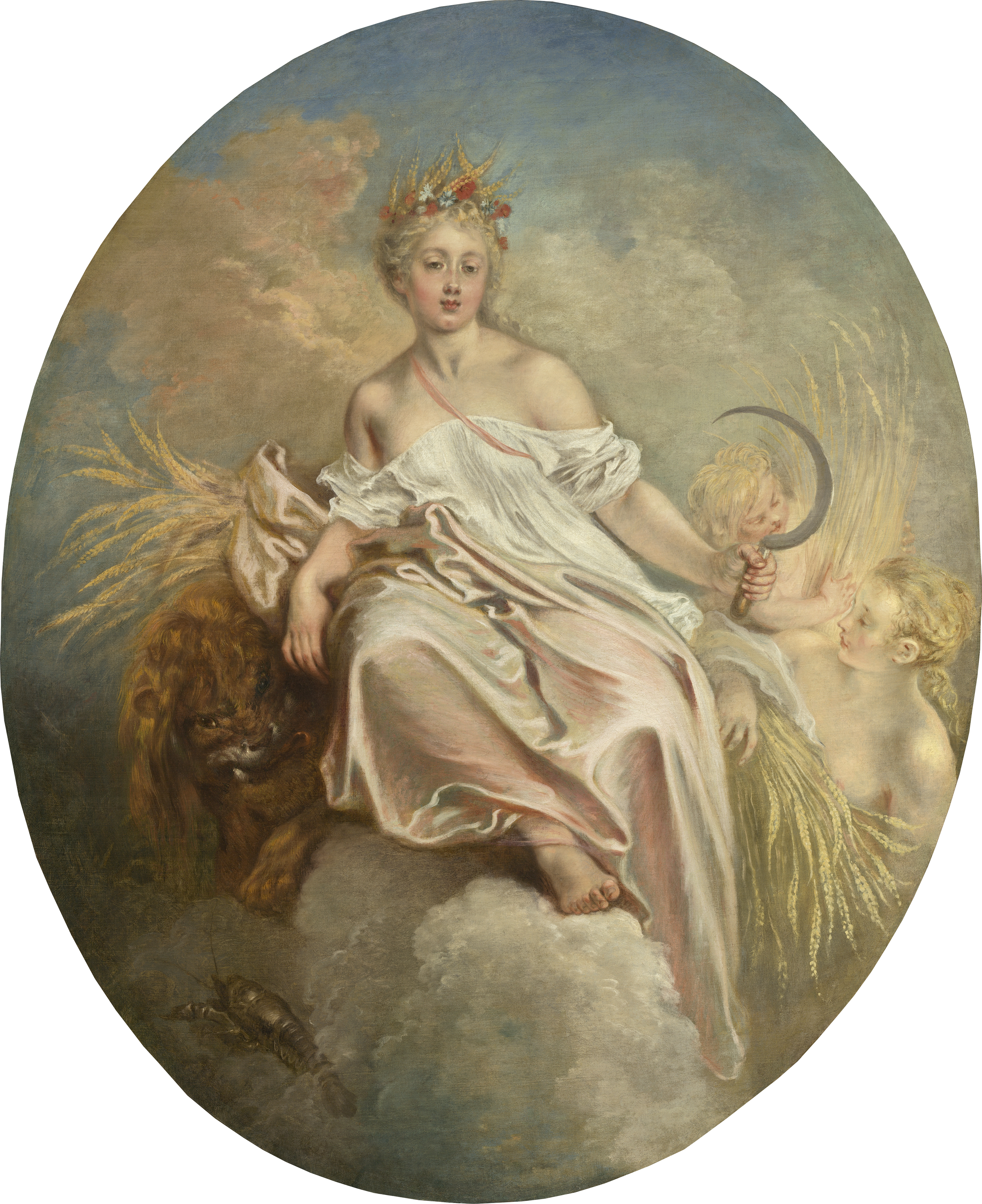
Ceres (Summer), c. 1717–1718, National Gallery of Art, Washington, D. C.

== Bibliography ==
- Camesasca, Ettore [in Portuguese] (1971) [first published in Italian in 1968]. The Complete Paintings of Watteau. Classics of the World's Great Art. Introduction by John Sunderland. New York: Harry N. Abrams. ISBN 0810955253. OCLC 143069 – via the Internet Archive.
- Crow, Thomas E. (1985). Painters and Public Life in Eighteenth-Century Paris. New Haven; London: Yale University Press. ISBN 0-300-03764-3. OCLC 1200566051 – via the Internet Archive.
- Dacier, Émile; Vuaflart, Albert; Herold, Jacques (1921–1929). Jean de Julienne et les graveurs de Watteau au XVIII-e siècle (in French). Paris: M. Rousseau. Volumes 1, 2, 3, and 4 available via the Heidelberg University Library repository
- Dormandy, Thomas (2000). The White Death: the History of Tuberculosis. New York University Press.
- Goncourt, Edmond et Jules de (1881). L'art du XVIIIme siècle [The Art of the Eighteenth Century] (in French). Vol. 1. Paris: G. Charpentier. OCLC 1048224230 – via the Internet Archive.
- Grasselli, Margaret Morgan; Rosenberg, Pierre & Parmantier, Nicole, eds. (1984). Watteau, 1684-1721 (PDF) (exhibition catalogue). National Gallery of Art. ISBN 0-89468-074-9. OCLC 557740787 – via the National Gallery of Art archive.
- Hind, Charles Lewis (1910). Watteau. London: T.C. & E.C. Jack – via the Internet Archive.
- Huyghe, René (1970) [1950]. Watteau: The Artist and His Drawings. Translated by Barbara Bray. New York: Braziller. ISBN 9780269027093. OCLC 556662493 – via the Internet Archive.
- Konody, Paul George (1911). "Watteau, Antoine" . In Chisholm, Hugh (ed.). Encyclopædia Britannica. Vol. 28 (11th ed.). Cambridge University Press. pp. 417–418.
- Levey, Michael (1966). Rococo to Revolution: Major Trends in Eighteenth-Century Painting. London: Thames and Hudson. OCLC 1036855531 – via the Internet Archive.
- Mauclair, Camille (1906). Antoine Watteau (1684-1721). Duckworth & Co – via the Internet Archive.
- Michel, Christian (2008). Le "célèbre Watteau" (in French). Genève: Droz. ISBN 978-2-600-01176-1. OCLC 1158803919.
- Mollett, John William (1883). Watteau. Illustrated Biographies of the Great Artists. London: S. Low, Marston, Searle & Rivington. OCLC 557720162 – via the Internet Archive.
- Perl, Jed (2009). Antoine's Alphabet: Watteau and His World. New York: Vintage Books. ISBN 978-0-307-38594-9.
- Phillips, Claude (1895). Antoine Watteau. Seeley and co. Limited. OCLC 729123867 – via the Internet Archive.
- Plax, Julie Anne (2000). Watteau and the Cultural Politics of Eighteenth-Century France. Cambridge etc.: Cambridge University Press. ISBN 0-521-64268-X. OCLC 803847893.
- Plomp, Michiel; Sonnabend, Martin (2016). Watteau: Der Zeichner (exhibition catalogue) (in German). München: Hirmer. ISBN 978-3-941399-66-2.
- Posner, Donald (1984). Antoine Watteau. London: Weidenfeld & Nicolson. ISBN 0-8014-1571-3. OCLC 10736607 – via the Internet Archive.
- Roland Michel, Marianne (1984). Watteau: an Artist of the Eighteenth Century. London: Trefoil. ISBN 0-86294-049-4. OCLC 1302554747 – via the Internet Archive.
- Roseberg, Pierre, ed. (1984). Vies anciennes de Watteau. Paris: Hermann. ISBN 2-7056-5985-4.
- Rosenberg, Pierre & Prat, Louis-Antoine (1996). Antoine Watteau: catalogue raisonné des dessins (in French). Paris: Gallimard-Electa. ISBN 2-07-015043-7. OCLC 463981169.
- Rosenberg, Pierre; Prat, Louis-Antoine & Eidelberg, Martin (2011). Watteau: The Drawings (exhibition catalogue). London: Royal Academy of Arts. ISBN 9781905711703. OCLC 740683643.
- Schneider, Pierre (1967). The World of Watteau. New York: Time-Life Books. OCLC 680174683 – via the Internet Archive.
- Sheriff, Mary D., ed. (2006). Antoine Watteau: Perspectives on the Artist and the Culture of His Time. Newark: University of Delaware. ISBN 978-0-87413-934-1. OCLC 185456942.
- Staley, Edgcumbe (1902). Watteau and His School. London: George Bell and Sons – via the Internet Archive.
- Stein, Perrin (October 2003). "Antoine Watteau (1684–1721)" (essay). Heilbrunn Timeline of Art History. New York: Metropolitan Museum of Art.
- Vidal, Mary (1992). Watteau's Painted Conversations: Art, Literature, and Talk in Seventeenth- and Eighteenth-Century France. New Haven, London: Yale University Press. ISBN 0-300-05480-7. OCLC 260176725.
- Walsh, Linda (1999). "Subjects, Society, Style: Changing Evaluations of Watteau and His Art". In Barker, Emma; Webb, Nick; Woods, Kim (eds.). The Changing Status of the Artist. Art and Its Histories. Vol. 2. New Haven, London: Yale University Press. pp. 220–248. ISBN 0-300-07740-8. OCLC 1148191287 – via the Internet Archive.
- The Watteau Society Bulletin, London.
- Martin Eidelberg, watteauandhiscircle.org
