= Claude Phillips =

English writer

Sir Claude Phillips
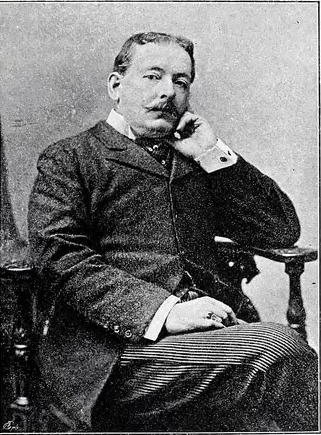
- Born: 29 January 1846; London, UK
- Died: 9 August 1924 (aged 78); London, UK
- Occupations: Writer, historian, critic
- Writing career
- Genres: non-fiction, art history, essay, literary criticism
- Notable works: The Life of Sir Joshua Reynolds, The Work of Titian

Sir Claude Phillips (29 January 1846 – 9 August 1924) was a British writer, art historian and critic for The Daily Telegraph, Manchester Guardian and other publications during the late 19th century. He was the first keeper of the Wallace Collection at Hertford House, writing its first catalogue, and held that post from 1900 until his retirement in 1911 whereupon he was knighted for his service. Phillips was considered one of the most eminent critics in Victorian Britain, and his numerous scholarly and art history books were widely read.

== Biography ==
The second son of Robert Abraham Phillips and Helen Levy, Claude Phillips was born at Gloster Villa, Regent's Park, London on 29 January 1846. He was educated in France and Germany prior to studying law at the University of London. He originally embarked on a career as a solicitor and was called to the bar in 1883. As a young barrister-at-law, he was often called to Italy on business and while there developed an interest in the arts.

Phillips eventually left the legal profession and became a music critic for The Daily Telegraph in the late 1880s. From 1885 to 1896, he was the English correspondent for the Gazette des Beaux-Arts in Paris. Among other Victorian era publications he wrote for included the Manchester Guardian, the Magazine of Art, the Academy and The Art Journal. Phillips became a widely known scholar in the field and later wrote several works on Joshua Reynolds, Antoine Watteau and Titian. One of his best known books was The Life of Sir Joshua Reynolds (1894).

After a particularly well-received article on Rodin, he became a full-time art critic for The Daily Telegraph in 1897. That same year, Phillips was appointed the first keeper of the Wallace Collection and spent the next three years preparing its catalogue prior to its opening at Hertford House in 1900. He held that post until his retirement 14 years later. In 1914 he was included in a caricature by Edmund Dulac which was part of the Wallace Collection. The humorous painting is called "Le Legende de Joseph".

Phillips was succeeded by Dugald Sutherland MacColl, and received a knighthood for his service shortly afterwards. Phillips died on 9 August 1924 at the age of 78. A collection of his essays, Emotion in Art (1925), was published posthumously the following year. The caricature of him was eventually given to the UK through the Art Fund, a charity that Phillips helped to set up.

== Bibliography ==
- Randolph Caldecott (1886)
- A Century of French Art at the Paris Exhibition (1889)
- Punch Drawings and Cartoons (1891)
- Catalogue of a Collection of Drawings by the late Charles Keene (1891)
- John Opie (1892)
- Venetian Art at the New Gallery (1894)
- The Portfolio: Artistic Monographs (1894, with William Sharp, Dante Gabriel Rossetti, F. G. Stephens, C. J. Cornish and P. G. Hamerton)
- J. Bastien-Lepage (1894, with Julia Ady and Frederic Stephens)
- Pictures of the Year: The Royal Academy and the New Gallery (1895)
- The Portfolio Monographs on Artistic Subjects with Many Illustrations (1897, with Lionel Cust, Laurence Binyon and J. Starkie Garner)
- The Collection of Pictures at Longford Castle (1897)
- Frederick Walker and His Works (1897)
- Millais's Works at Burlington House (1898)
- The Work of Titian (1898)
- Titian: A Study of His Life and Work (1898)
- The Later Work of Titian (1898)
- Verrocchio, or Leonardo da Vinci? (1899)
- The Van Dyck Exhibition at Antwerp (1899)
- The 'Perseus and Andromeda' of Titian (1900)
- The Picture Gallery of the Hermitage (1900)
- The Wallace Collection (1901)
- Masterpieces of French Art in the XVIII century (1901)
- Impressions of the Bruges Exhibition (1902)
- Great Portrait-Sculpture through the Ages (1903)
- A Portrait of Girolamo del Pacchia (1905)
- The Ariosto of Titian (1905)
- Dramatic Portraiture (1906)
- Two Paintings by Filippino Lippi (1906)
- The Earlier Work of Titian (1906)
- Antoine Watteau (1907)
- Notes on Palma Vecchio (1907)
- The Masterpieces of Greuze (1909)
- French Art of the Eighteenth Century (1914)
- III National Loan Exhibition (1914)
- Summer exhibition at the Grafton Galleries, 1916 (1916)
- Barbizon House, 1919 (1919, with T. W. Roberts, Arthur L. Savage and D. Croal Thomson)
- Emotion in Art (1925, posthumously)
