= Jean de Jullienne =

French art collector, patron and manufacturer (1686–1766)

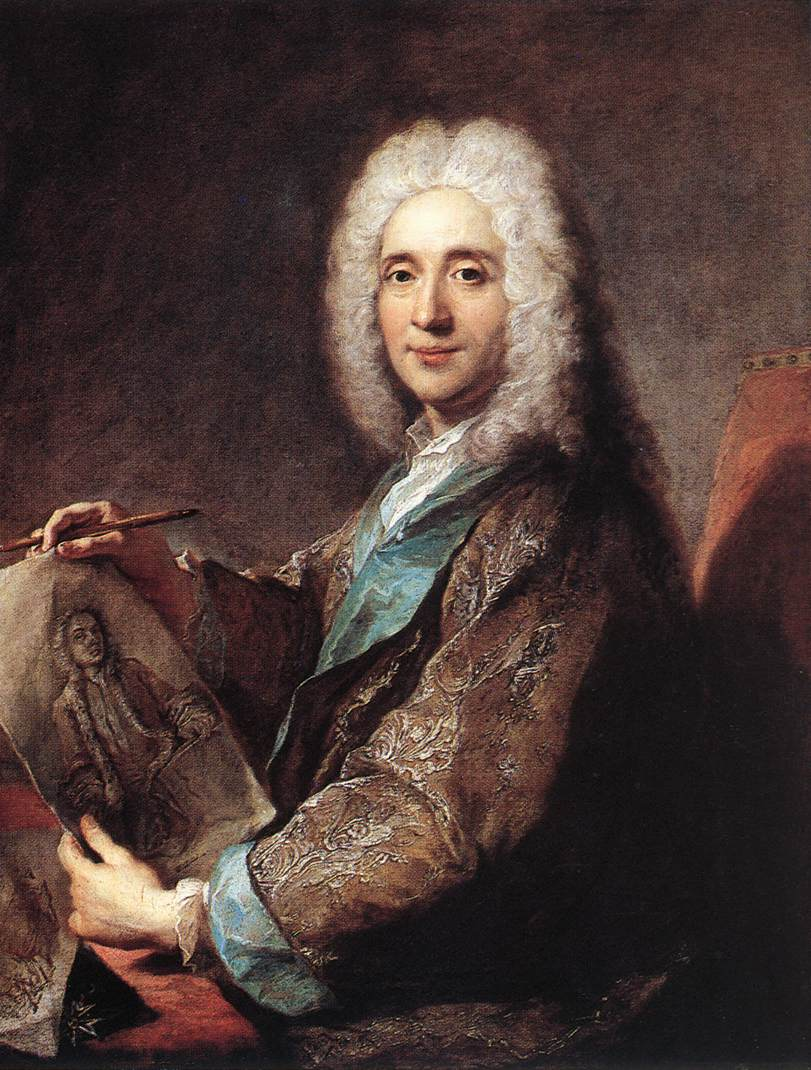
Francois de Troy, Jean Jullienne, 1720s, Musée des Beaux-Arts, Valenciennes

Jean de Jullienne (né Jean Jullienne; 29 November 1686 — 20 March 1766) was a French textile manufacturer, art collector, and amateur engraver, best remembered as a friend and protector of the painter Antoine Watteau. He was born and died in Paris.

He was the nephew of François Jullienne, who retired from business in 1729 and made Jean manager of the tapestry factory François had set up with his brother-in-law, Jean Glucq, near the Manufacture Royale des Gobelins.

After the death of Watteau, Jullienne contributed to his artistic legacy by issuing L'Oeuvre d'Antoine Watteau, a large set of engravings after Watteau.

== Bibliography ==
- Dacier, Émile; Vuaflart, Albert; Herold, Jacques (1921–1929). Jean de Julienne et les graveurs de Watteau au XVIII-e siècle (in French). Paris: M. Rousseau. Volumes 1, 2, 3, and 4 available via the Heidelberg University Library repository
- Tillerot, Isabelle (2010). Jean de Jullienne et les collectionneurs de son temps: un regard singulier sur le tableau (in French). Paris: Éditions de la Maison des sciences d l’homme.
- Tillerot, Isabelle (2011). "Engraving Watteau in the Eighteenth Century: Order and Display in the Recueil Jullienne". Getty Research Journal. 3 (3): 33–52. doi:10.1086/grj.3.23005386. eISSN 2329-1249. ISSN 1944-8740. JSTOR 23005386. S2CID 192107598.
- Turner, Jane, ed. (1996). "Jullienne, Jean de". The Dictionary of Art. 17. New York: Grove's Dictionaries. p. 684. ISBN 1-884446-00-0. OCLC 1033634748 — via the Internet Archive.
- Vogtherr, Christoph Martin (2011). Jean de Jullienne : Collector & Connoisseur. London: Trustees of the Wallace Collection.
- Grasselli, Margaret Morgan; Rosenberg, Pierre & Paramantier, Nicole (1984). Watteau, 1684-1721; National Gallery of Art, June 17—September 23, 1984; Galeries Nationales du Grand Palais, Paris, October 23, 1984—January 28, 1985; Schloss Charlottenburg, Berlin, February 22—May 26, 1985. Washington: National Gallery of Art. ISBN 0-89468-074-9. OCLC 557740787 – via the National Gallery of Art archive.
