= Charlotte Desmares =

French actress

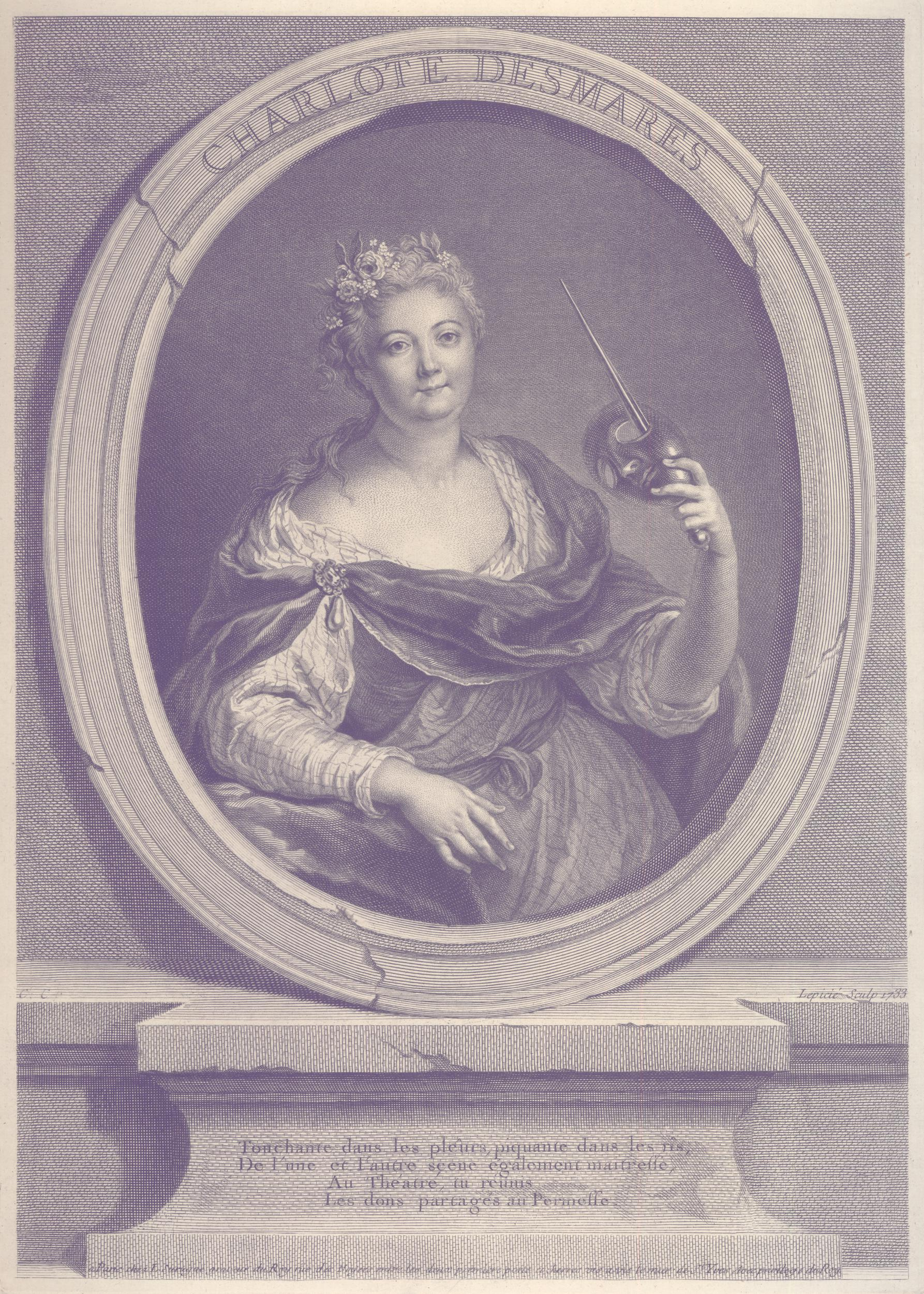
- Portrait print by François-Bernard Lépicié, 1733, after the untraced pastel by Charles-Antoine Coypel
- Born: Christine Antoinette Charlotte Desmares; 1682; Copenhagen, Denmark
- Died: September 12, 1753 (aged 70–71); Saint-Germain-en-Laye, France
- Occupation: actress
- Years active: 1699–1721
- Organization: Comédie-Française
- Children: 3, including Philippe Angélique de Froissy, comtesse de Ségur
- Parents: Nicolas Desmares (father); Anne d'Ennebault (mother)
- Relatives: Catherine Dangeville (sister); Marie Champmeslé (aunt); Marie-Anne Botot Dangeville (niece); Philippe Henri, marquis de Ségur (maternal grandson)

Christine Antoinette Charlotte Desmares (1682 – 12 September 1753), professionally known as M^{lle} Desmares, (Note: Throughout her career, she was also known as La Desmares and, as a child actor, Lolotte.) was a French stage actress. Scion of a notable comic actor family, she had an active stage career that spanned three decades, performing with the Comédie-Française from 1699 until her retirement in 1721; she was also remembered as a mistress of Philippe II, Duke of Orléans, Regent of France.

== Life ==
She was born in Copenhagen to the comic actors Nicolas Desmares and Anne d'Ennebault and trained under her aunt la Champmeslé. She made her stage début aged sixteen with the Comédie-Française company on 30 January 1699 in Oreste et Pylade by Lagrange-Chancel. In only three months she became so successful that she was accepted as a sociétaire of the company to replace her aunt, who had left it in 1698. Succeeding her aunt as the company's leading actress, Desmares played tragic roles (such as Hermione in Andromaque by Jean Racine, Émilie in Cinna by Pierre Corneille, and Jocasta in Oedipus by Voltaire) as well as comedy ones (such as Lisette in Le Légataire universel by Regnard and Néréine in Le Curieux impertinent by Destouches); along with her company-mate and rival Mademoiselle Duclos, Desmares was a follower of high, formal and oratorical style of acting that defined the Comédie-Française in the early 18th century. In light of the younger actress Adrienne Lecouvreur's success that followed her Comédie-Française debut in 1717, Desmares retired in Spring 1721, giving occasional private performances in her retirement; in years to come, she was succeeded by Lecouvreur and, later, by Marie-Anne Botot Dangeville.

Early in her career, she was a mistress to the King Louis XIV's son, the Grand Dauphin, and then to his nephew and son-in-law, the Duke of Chartres. With the latter, she had a daughter c. 1700–1702, (Note: From Madame Palatine's correspondence, it has been thought that Angélique de Froissy was born in 1702, for she was said to be fourteen years old in Madame's letter dated 26 July 1716. Pevitt 1997, p. 55, and Petitfils 2001, p. 73, however, place Froissy's birth at Autumn 1700, the same time Charlotte Aglaé d'Orléans, the Duke of Orleans' third daughter with Françoise Marie de Bourbon, was born.) named Angélique de Froissy by her father and married off to count Henri François de Ségur. Desmares ended her life as the mistress of the Swiss banker Antoine Hogguer, who built the Hôtel de Villeroy, designed by François Debias-Aubry, for her in Paris at 78 Rue de Varreau. She also built herself another mansion, La Folie Desmares in Châtillon, which still survives. She died in Saint-Germain-en-Laye in 1753. (Note: In a journal entry on 24 September 1753, the 4th Duke of Luynes mentions Desmares's death, also recounting her later life.)

== Cultural depictions ==
=== In literature ===
In the picaresque novel Gil Blas, Alain-René Lesage gives what, though disputed, is usually thought to be a literary portrait of Desmares:

"I am enchanted by the actress who plays the suivante in the intermèdes. Ah, how pretty natural! With what grace she occupies the stage! Is it the moment for some witty remark? She seasons it with a smile so sly and full of charm that it gives it new importance. One might reproach her that she sometimes is little too intense, and passes the bounds of decent boldness; but there's no need to be so severe. I would only want her to correct one bad habit. Often she suddenly stops the action in the middle of a scene to give in to a mad need to laugh that overtakes her. You will tell me that the public applauds her in those moments. So be it."

=== In art ===
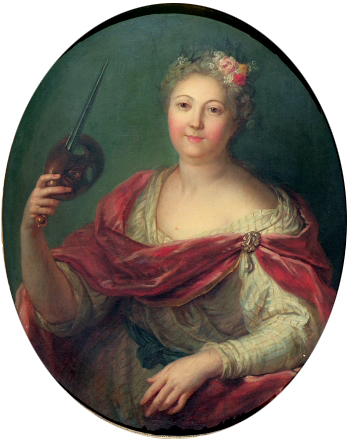
Copy after Charles-Antoine Coypel, Charlotte Desmares, oil on canvas, Comédie-Française, Paris

In modern historiography, there are two portraits of Desmares regarded as authentic. One of them is a 1720s pastel by Charles-Antoine Coypel, published in 1733 as an etching by François-Bernard Lépicié; the pastel was mentioned in Desmares' inventory of 1746. In Coypel's pastel, now presumed lost, Desmares is shown holding a mask and a dagger, indicating her abilities in comedy and tragedy, stressed in the quatrain on Lépicié's print. An oil on canvas copy of the pastel, once attributed to Coypel and owned by the painter Pierre-Nolasque Bergeret, was acquired from the latter in 1827 by the Comédie-Française, where it remains. Another authentic portrait of Desmares, painted by Jacques Aved, was listed in Desmares' inventory of 1753; it then passed to her daughter Charlotte d'Amour, remaining until the latter's death in 1783.

Aside from aforementioned works, Desmares is also widely associated by scholars, to various success, with numerous paintings by contemporaneous artists such as Jean-Baptiste Santerre and Antoine Watteau. As for Santerre, it had been claimed as early as the late 1870s that his painting of the 1700s, Young Lady with a Letter, (Note: Various versions of Young Lady with a Letter are known in public and private collections, including the Comédie-Française and the Museum of Fine Arts, Boston.) was a portrait of Desmares, with no concrete evidence to verify it though; in contrary to that point, it has been said that Santerre's subject does not at all resemble Desmares when compared with Coypel's pastel, and it is actually an imaginary figure in fancy dress, often present in Santerre's late-era art. There is also a wool and silk tapestry after design by Santerre, similar to Young Lady with a Letter, in the Metropolitan Museum of Art, New York City, showing a woman in fancy dress holding a mask, once identified as Desmares. Another portrait presumed to be of Desmares, attributed to Jean Raoux, was in the writer Arsène Houssaye's collection, sold in 1896.

As for Watteau, it has been speculated by scholars that he had some connection to the actress. According to the Soviet scholar Inna Nemilova, Watteau was a life-long admirer of Desmares, to whom and her company-mates he was allegedly introduced by a friend, the librettist Antoine de Laroque; in an article published in the 1984–1985 exhibition catalogue Watteau, 1684–1721, the French theatre historian François Moureau says that Desmares also "had numerous reasons for meeting Watteau." It was long noted that a print by Louis Desplaces after Watteau, showing a woman dressed as pilgrim, has been captioned with Desmares' name; along with Coypel's pastel, it was also said to be an authentic portrait of Desmares. The figure appeared in Watteau's early painting, The Isle of Cythera now in the Städel, Frankfurt, notably related to Florent Carton Dancourt's play The Three Cousins that was believed to feature Desmares as Colette, a pilgrim; a developed version of the subject appears in the lower left corner of Watteau's signature painting, The Embarkation for Cythera. Other paintings by Watteau believed to depict Desmares include The Coquettes, dit Actors of the Comédie-Française, The Dreamer, (Note: In an 1896 article published in Gazette des Beaux-Arts, the French playwright and poet Gaston Schéfer suggested the leftmost figure of The Coquettes — the rightmost one as etched by Henri Simon Thomassin — to be a depiction of Desmares, upon comparing it with Lépicié's etching of Coypel's pastel. In 1950, the same conclusion was given by the Louvre staff curator Hélène Adhémar, who compared the Hermitage painting with a central figure in the Louvre version of The Embarkation for Cythera. Coming from Adhemar's point, the Hermitage staff curator Inna Nemilova also identified the character — a recurring subject in Watteau's art, also present in The Dreamer (now in the Art Institute of Chicago), the uncertainly attributed Polish Woman Standing (now in the National Museum, Warsaw), and the untraced Polish Woman Sitting — as Desmares. Although accepted by the French scholar Marianne Roland Michel, Nemilova's attribution was mostly questioned among Watteau scholars and biographers; nonetheless, it remains represented in Russian and some Western sources.) Fêtes Vénitiennes, and Love in the French Theatre. (Note: In works on 18th-century French art, the British art historian Michael Levey associated the female dancer in the centre of Fêtes Vénitiennes with Desmares. Though accepted by some authors, Levey's point has been challenged as unfounded. Similar subject, present as a central figure in Love in the French Theatre, was also thought to be Desmares.) The supposed connection between Watteau and Desmares became a topic of the 2007 French film on the painter, The Vanishing Point.

Presumed depictions of Desmares
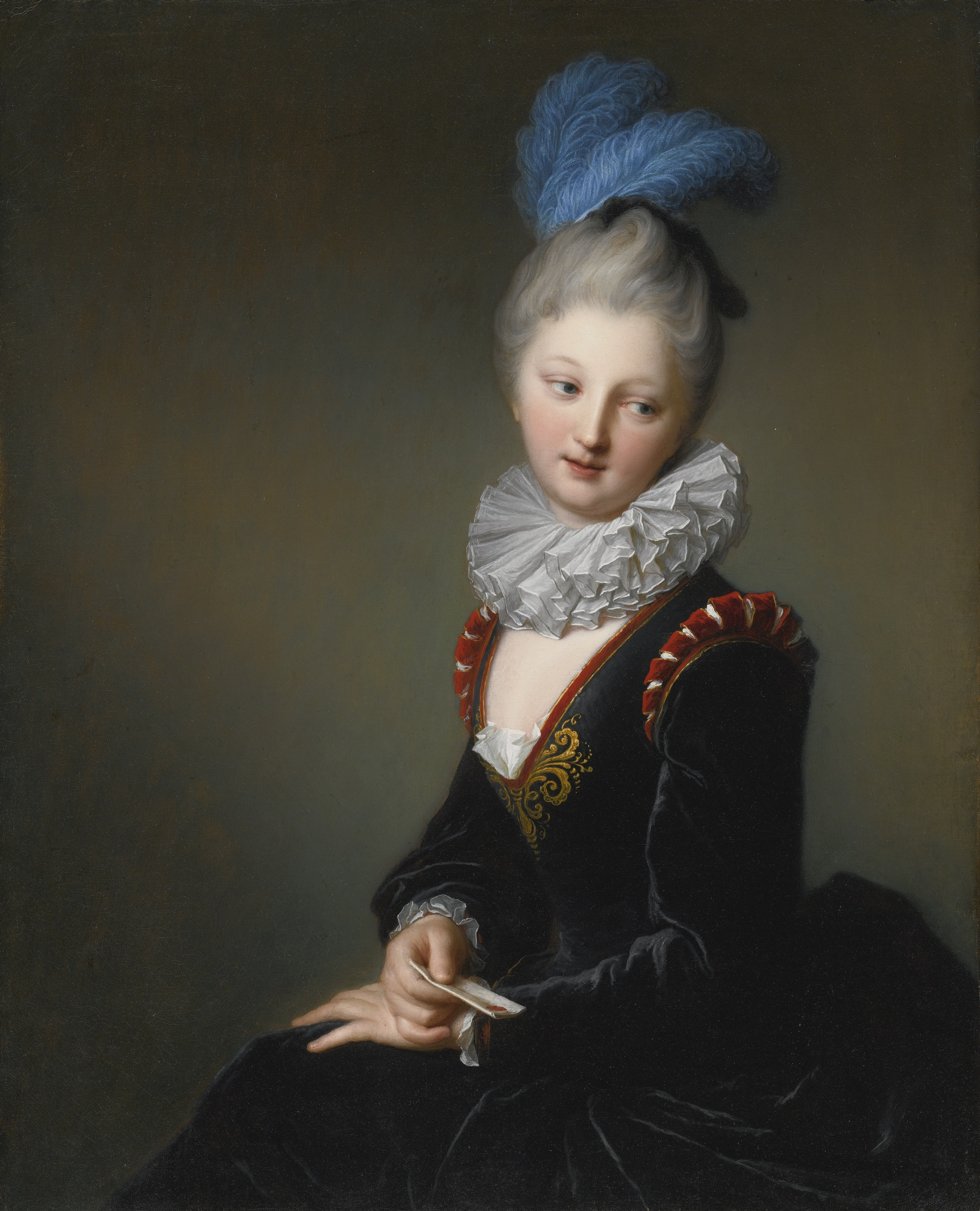
Jean-Baptiste Santerre, Young Lady with a Letter, 1700s, oil on canvas; private collection

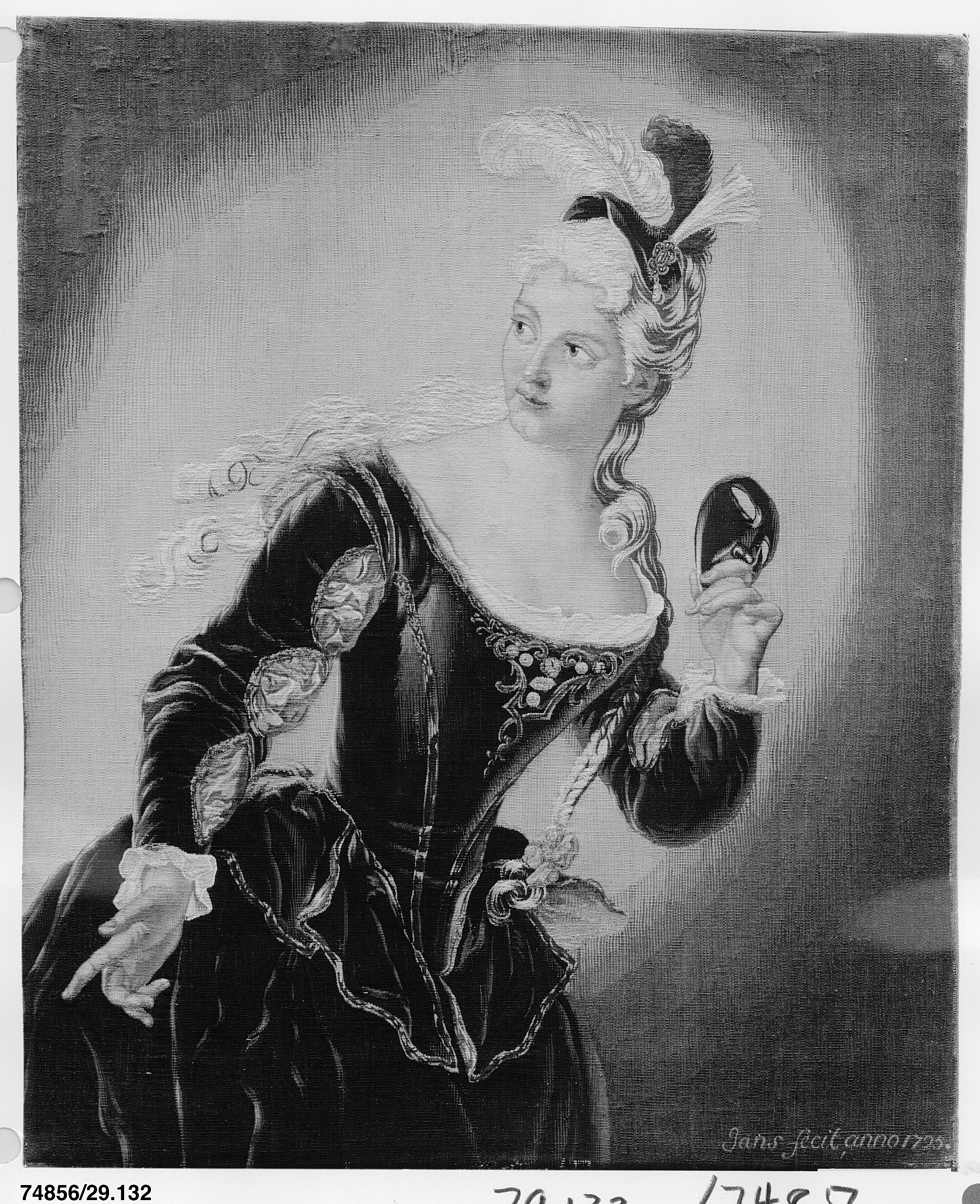
Jean-Jacques Jans after design by Santerre, Young Woman Holding a Mask, 1725, wool and silk tapestry; Metropolitan Museum of Art, New York City

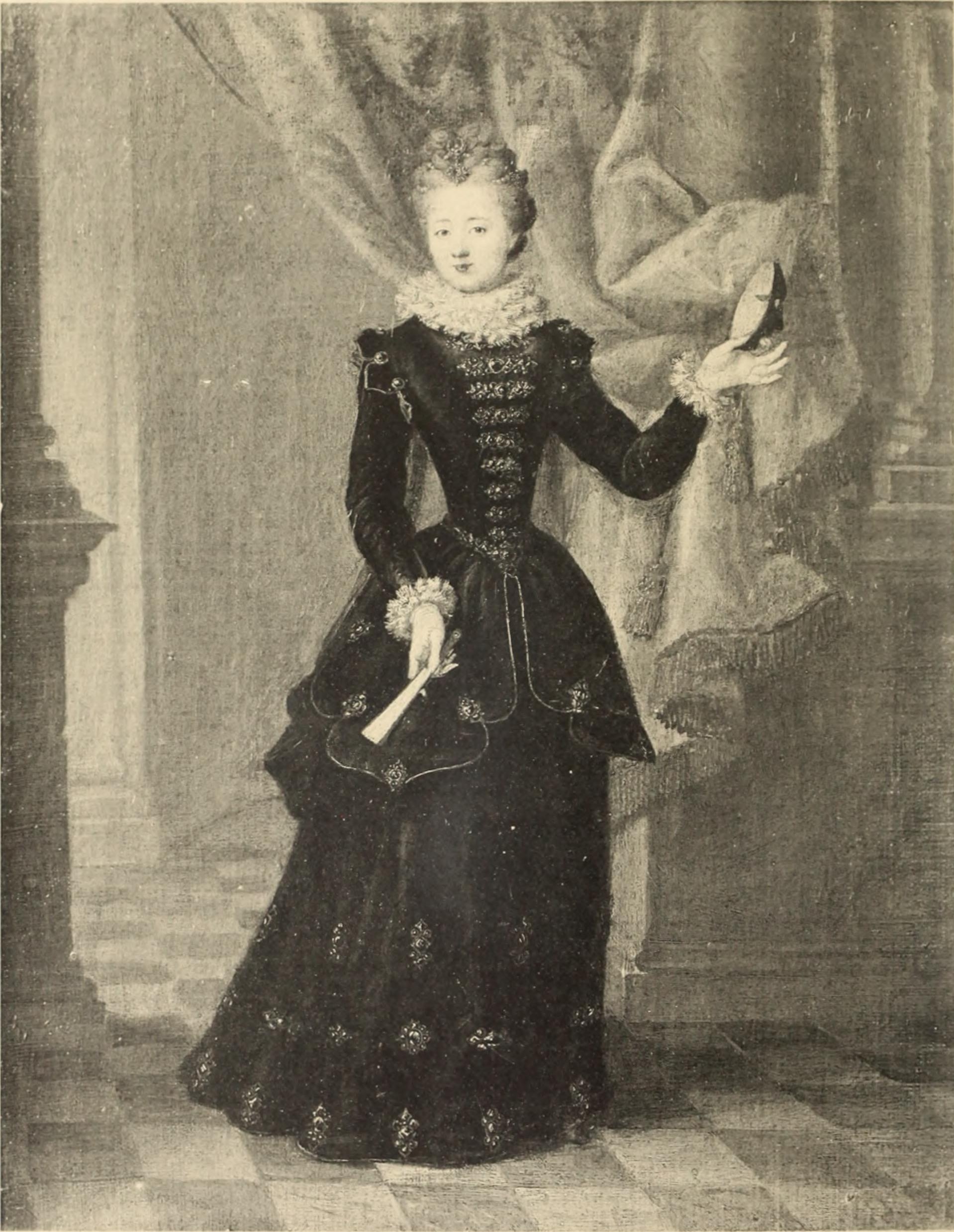
Attributed to Jean Raoux, Portrait de M^{lle} Desmares, oil on canvas; formerly owned by Arsène Houssaye

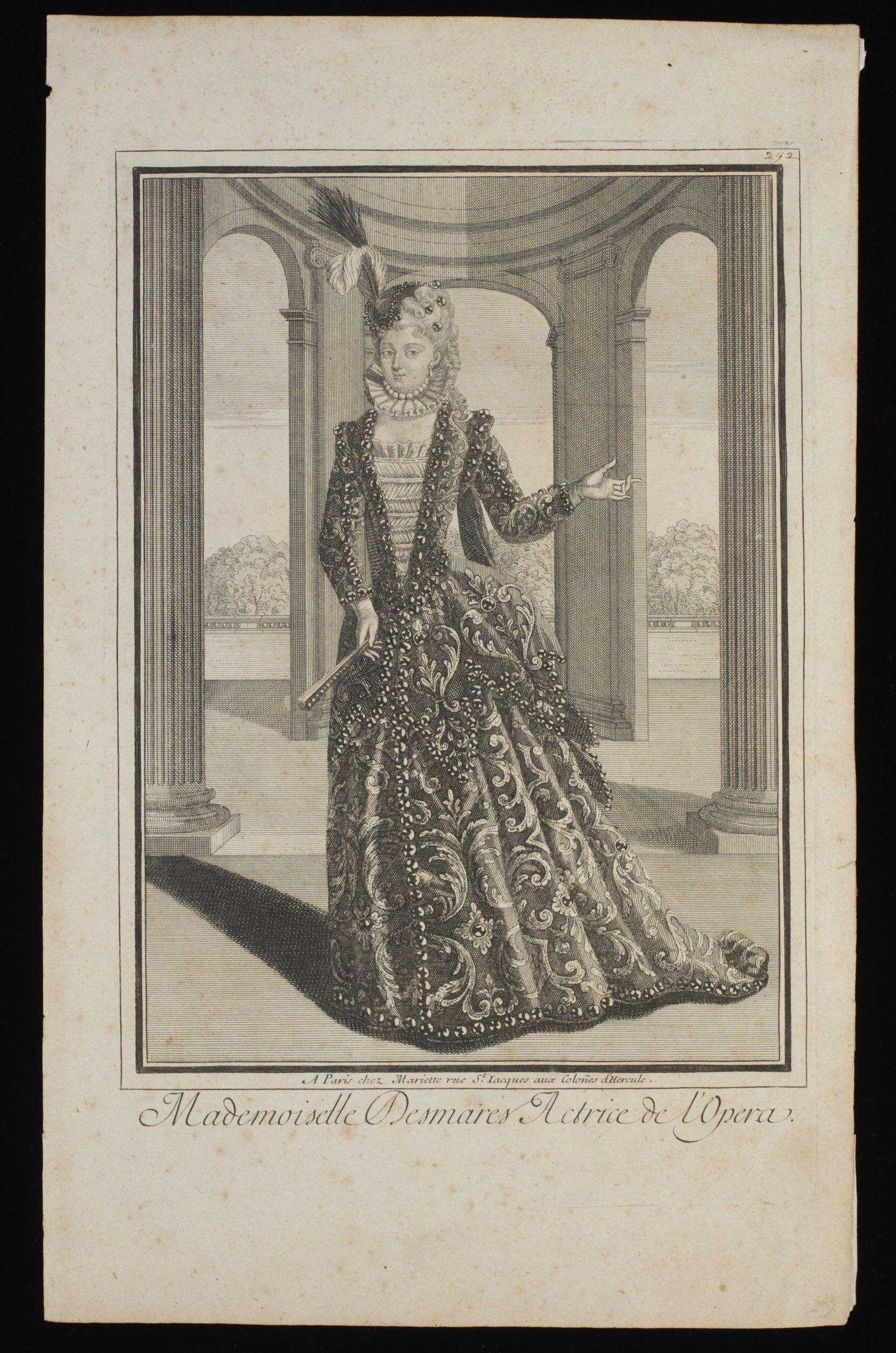
Anonymous, Mademoiselle Desmares, Actrice de l'Opera, early 18th century, etching; Victoria and Albert Museum, London

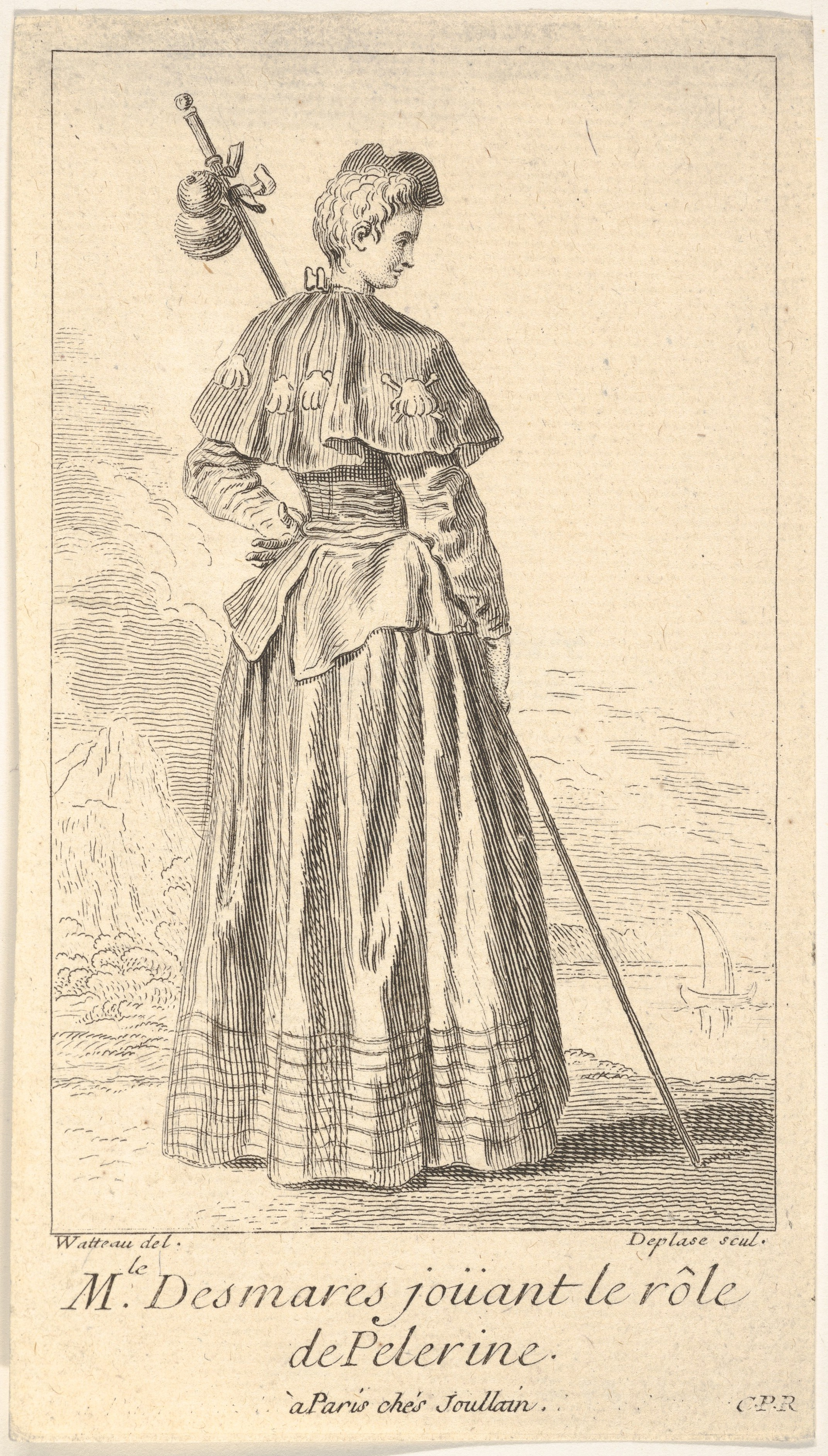
Louis Desplaces after Antoine Watteau, M^{lle} Desmares joüant le rôle de Pelerine, 1710s, etching; Metropolitan Museum of Art, New York City

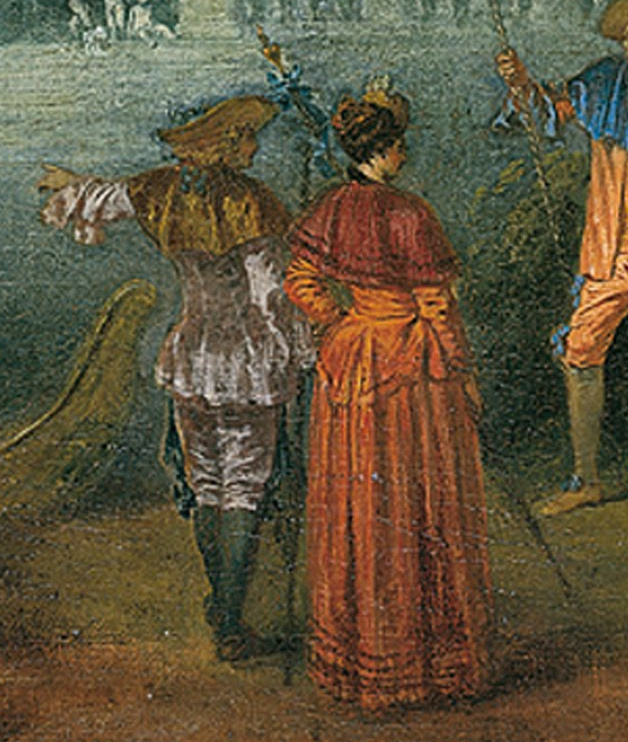
Watteau, detail of The Isle of Cythera, c. 1709–1713, oil on canvas; Städel, Frankfurt

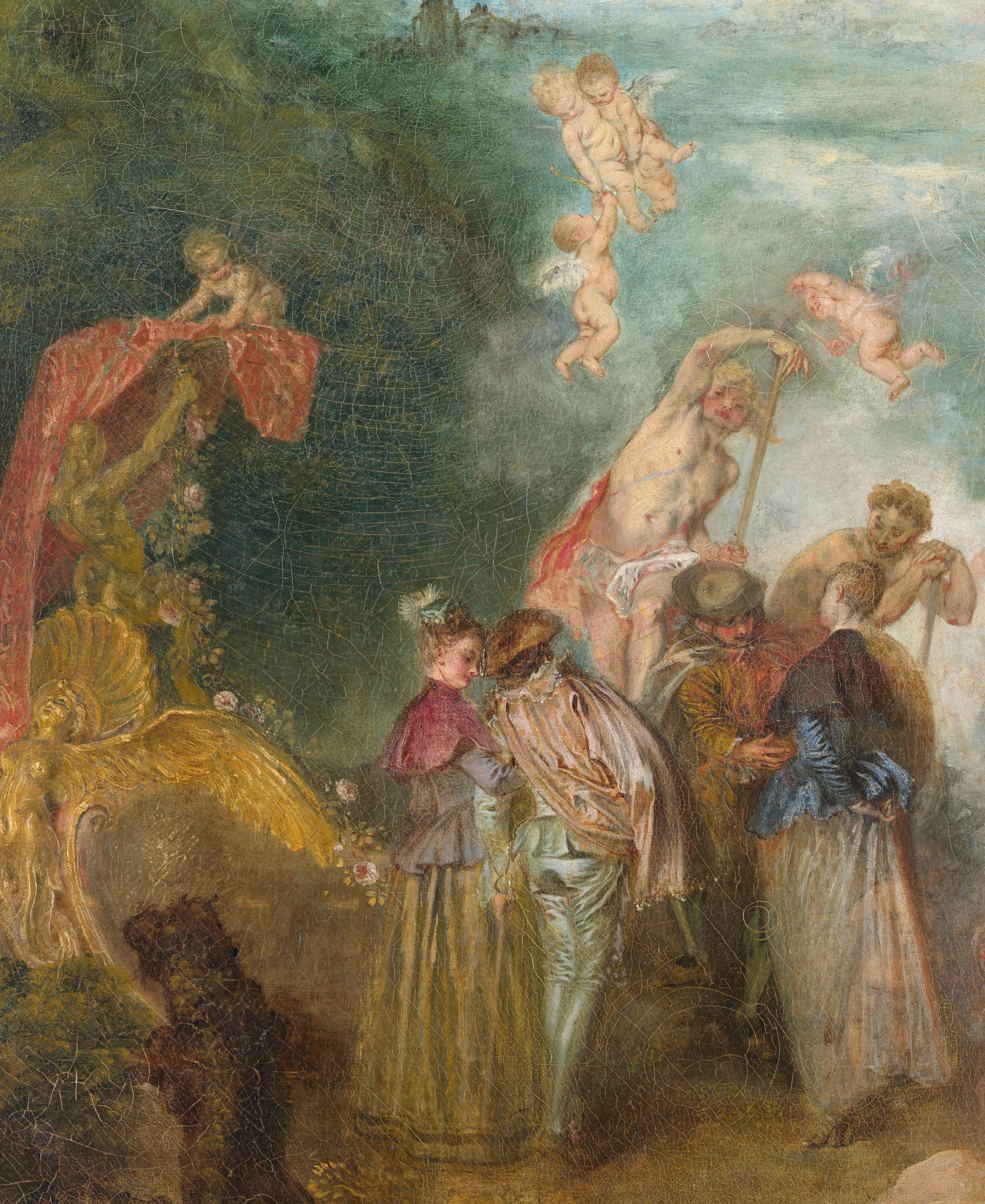
Watteau, detail of The Embarkation for Cythera, 1717, oil on canvas; Louvre, Paris

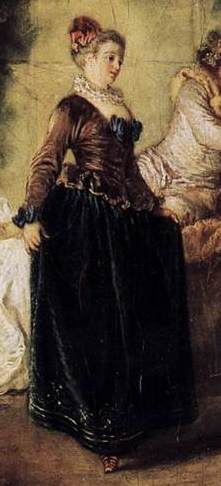
Watteau, detail of Love in the French Theatre, c. 1715–1716, oil on canvas; Gemäldegalerie, Berlin

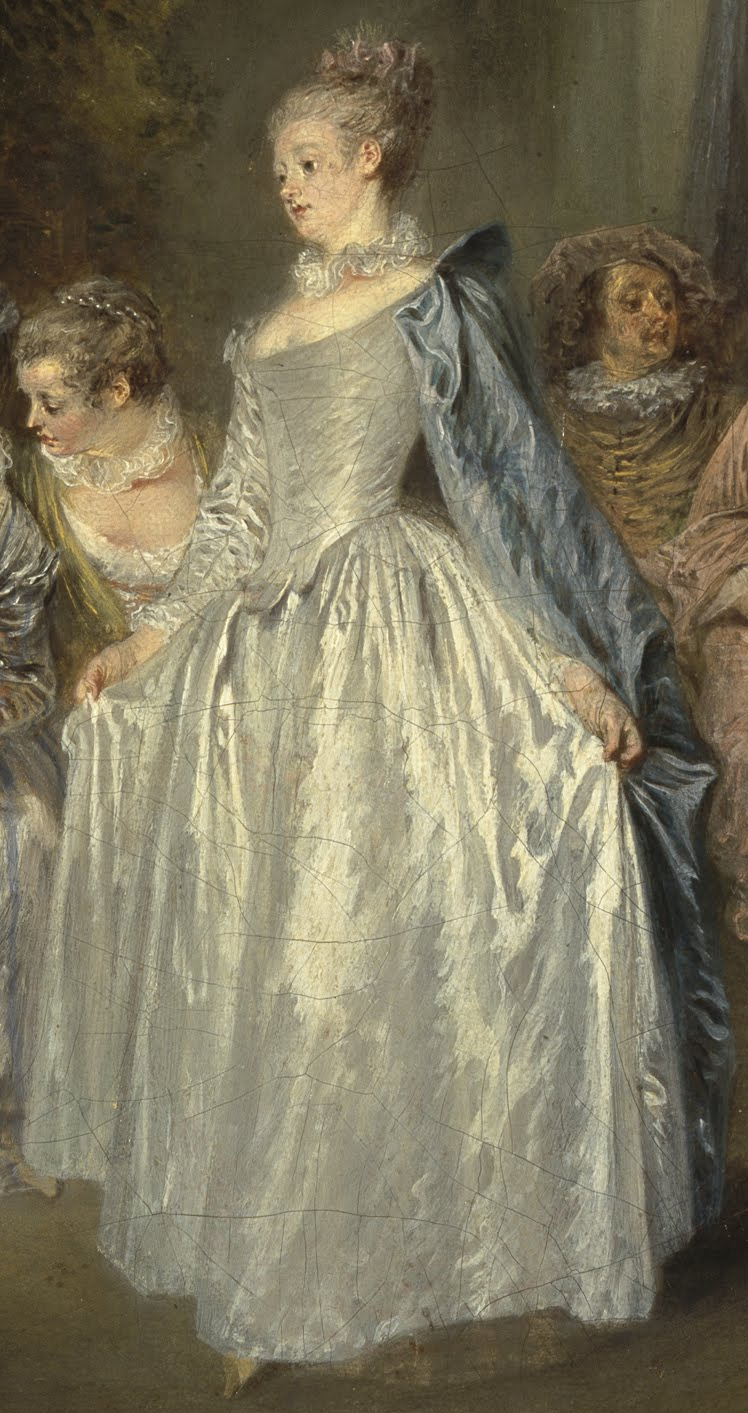
Watteau, detail of Fêtes Vénitiennes, c. 1718–1719, oil on canvas; National Galleries of Scotland, Edinburgh

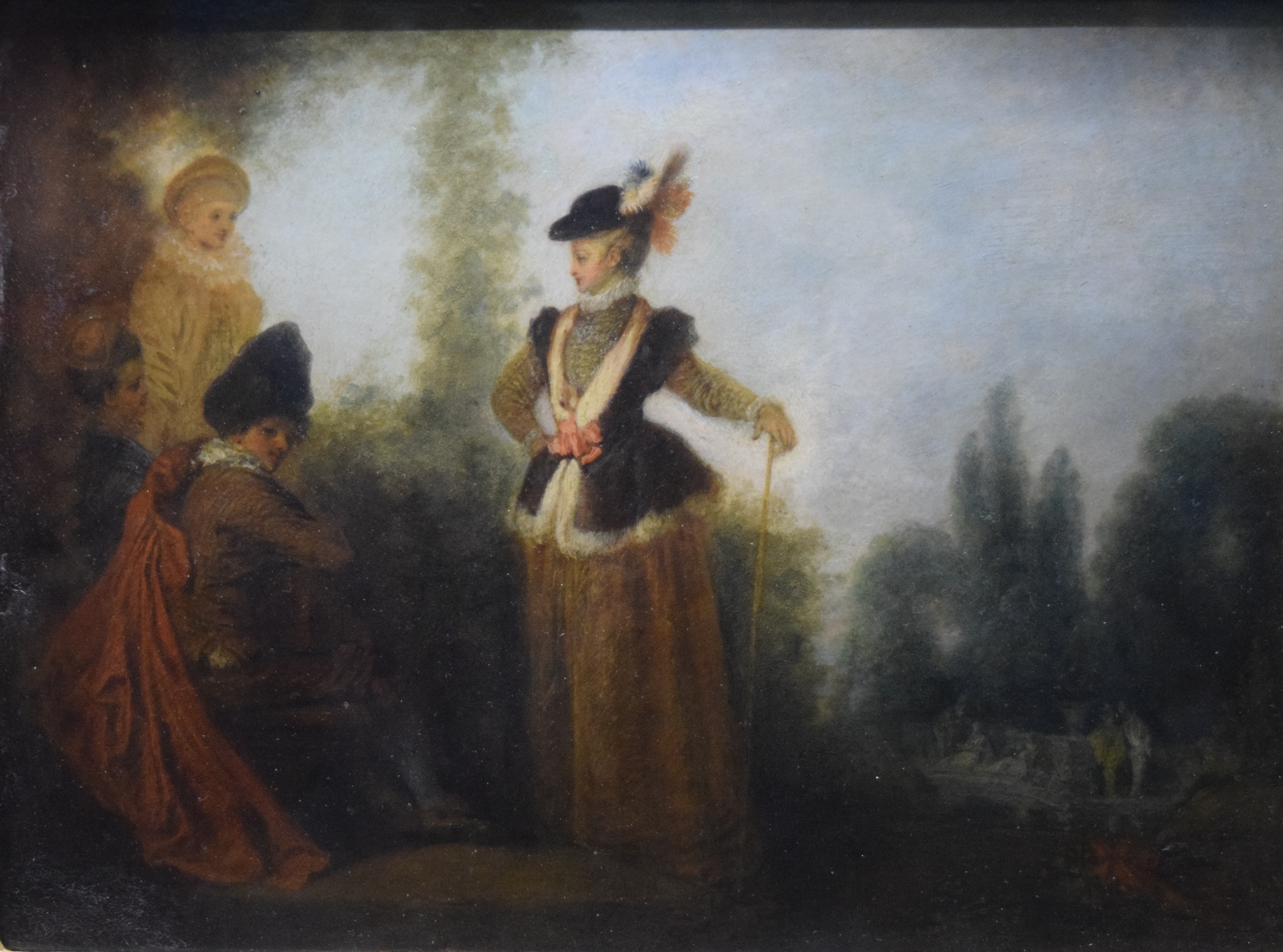
Watteau, L'Avanturière, c. 1712–1715, oil on copper; Musée des Beaux-Arts, Troyes

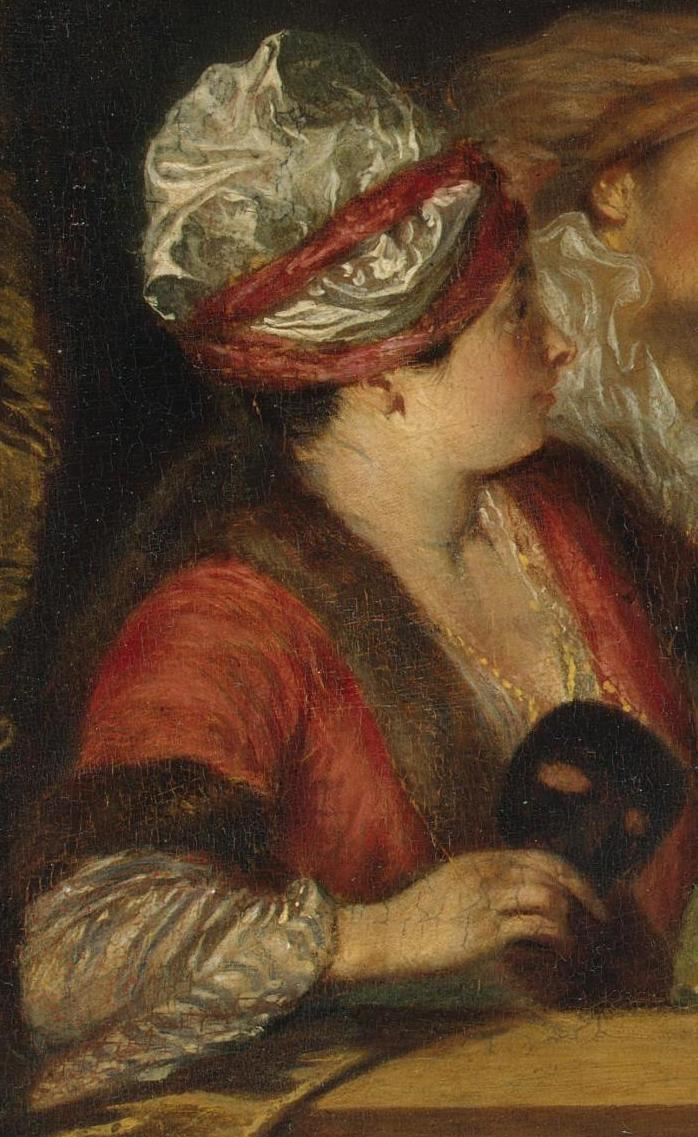
Watteau, detail of The Coquettes, the so-called Actors of the Comédie-Française, c. 1711–1718, oil on panel; Hermitage Museum, Saint Petersburg

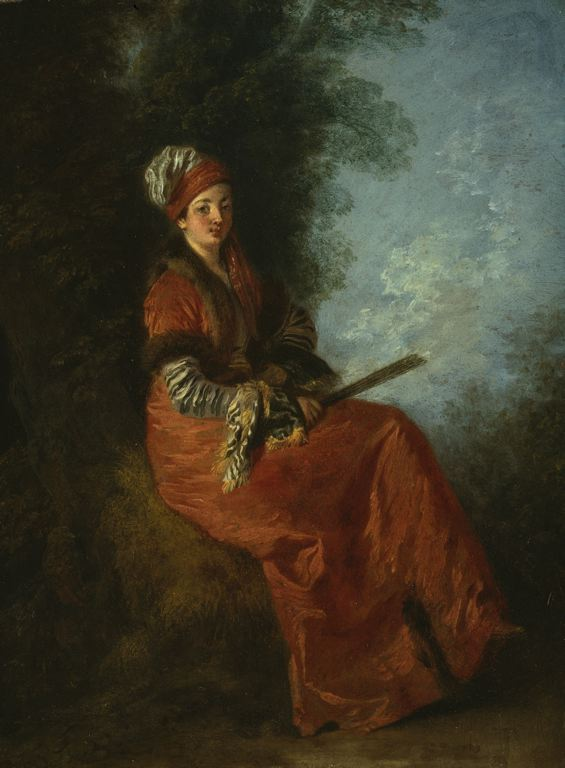
Watteau, The Dreamer, c. 1712–1717, oil on panel; Art Institute, Chicago

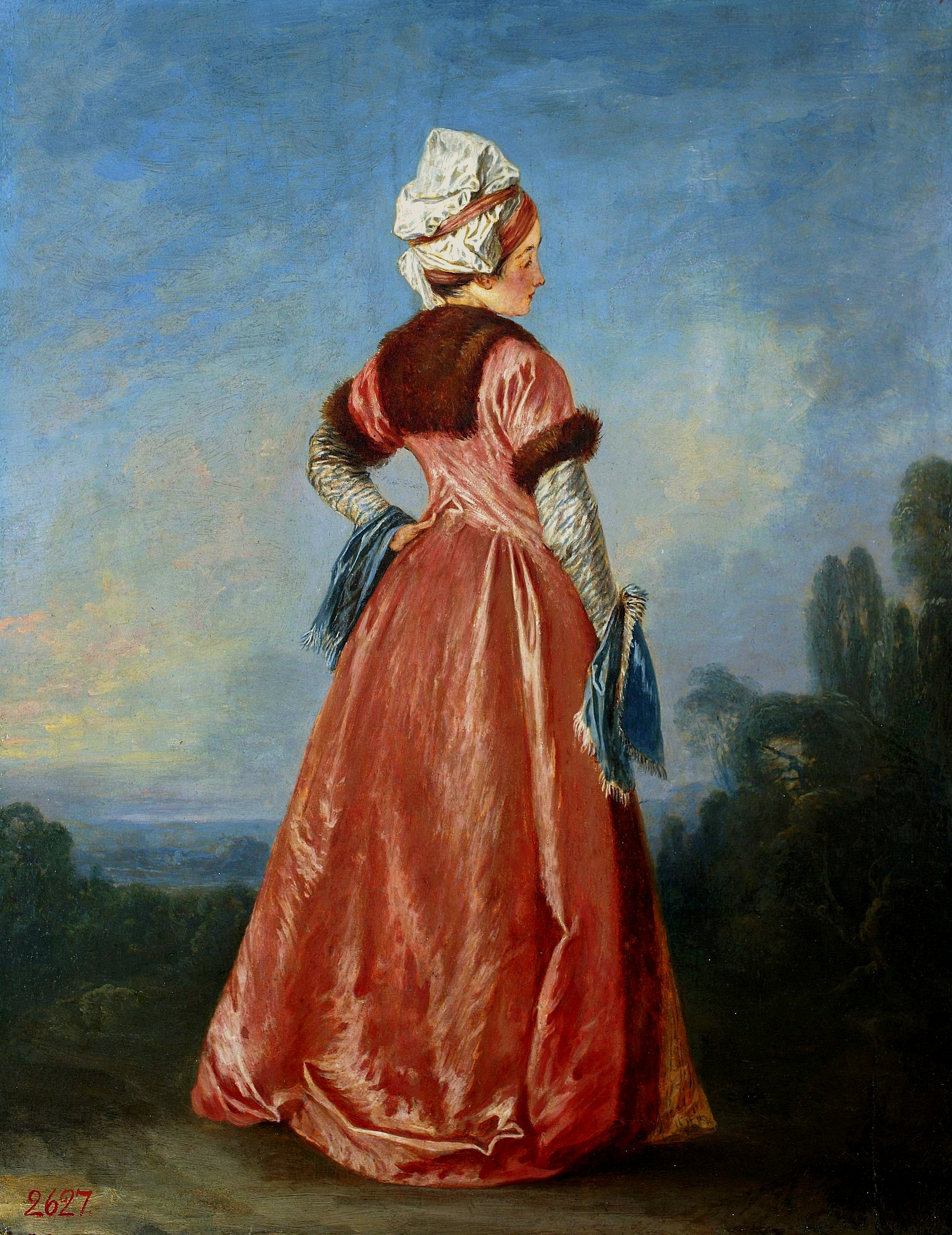
Watteau (?), Polish Woman, c. 1710–1720s, oil on panel; National Museum, Warsaw

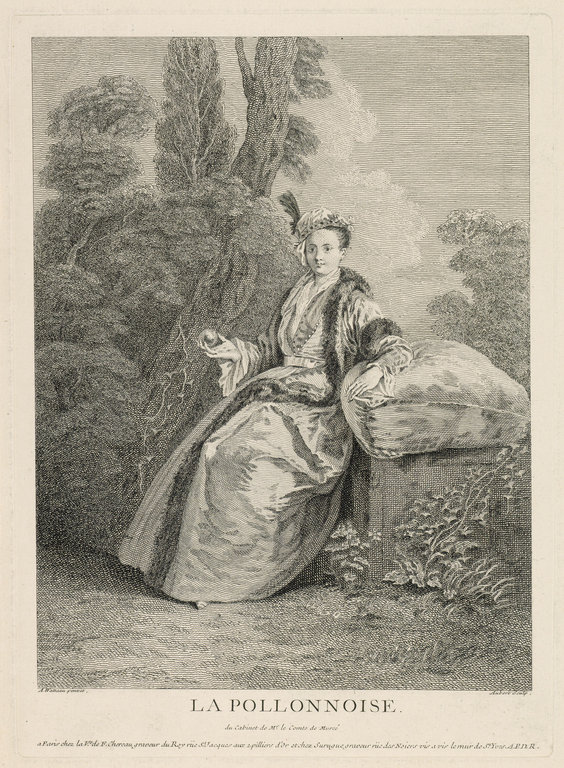
Michel Aubert after Watteau, La Polonnoise, 1730s, etching; Louvre, Paris

== Bibliography ==
- Alis, Bernard (2014). Mademoiselle Desmares de la Comédie-Française (in French). Châtillon: les Amis du vieux Châtillon. ISBN 978-2-9513219-0-8. OCLC 910889182. BnF 442815010.
- Belova, Y. N. (2006). "Аттрибуция изображенных лиц на картине Антуана Ватто "Актёры французского театра" ["Attribution of persons portrayed by Antoine Watteau in his "Actors of Theatre French"]". Экспертиза и атрибуция произведений изобразительного искусства: материалы X научной конференции (conference papers) (in Russian). Moscow: Magnum Ars. pp. 58–63.
- Brockett, Oscar Gross (1982). History of the Theatre (4th ed.). Boston: Allyn and Bacon. ISBN 0-205-07661-0 – via the Internet Archive.
- Campardon, Émile (1879). Les Comédiens du roi de la troupe française pendant des deux derniers siècles; documents inédits recueillis aux archives nationales. Paris: H. Champion. OCLC 1042536882 – via Internet Archive.
- Carlson, Marvin A. (1998). Voltaire and the Theatre of the Eighteenth Century. Westport, Conn.: Greenwood Press. ISBN 0-313-30302-9. OCLC 1151667299 – via Internet Archive.
- Clarke, Jan (2003). "Desmares, Charlotte". In Kennedy, Dennis (ed.). The Oxford Encyclopedia of Theatre & Performance. Vol. 1. Oxford; New York: Oxford University Press. p. 362. ISBN 0-19-860672-9 – via Internet Archive.
- Dacier, Émile (1905). Le musée de la Comédie-Française, 1680-1905. Paris: Librairie de l'art ancien et moderne. OCLC 1931000 – via Internet Archive.
- DeJean, Joan (2009). The Age of Comfort: When Paris Discovered Casual and the Modern Home Began. New York: Bloomsbury. ISBN 978-1-59691-405-6. OCLC 1145770221 – via Internet Archive.
- Diderot, Denis; Archer, William (1963). The Paradox of Acting and Masks of Faces?. New York: Hill and Wang. OCLC 1150992693 – via Internet Archive.
- Duerr, Edwin (1962). The Length and Depth of Acting. New York: Holt, Rinehart and Winston. OCLC 1150219613 – via Internet Archive.
- Dux, Pierre; Chevalley, Sylvie (1980). La Comédie Française: Trois Siècles de Gloire (in French). Paris: Denoël. OCLC 1150121010 – via Internet Archive.
- German, M. Y. (1984) [1980]. Антуан Ватто [Antoine Watteau] (in Russian). Leningrad: Iskusstvo. OCLC 19098229.
- Glorieux, Guillaume (2011). Watteau. Collection Les Phares (in French). Paris: Citadelles & Mazenod. ISBN 978-2-85088-340-8. OCLC 711039378.
- Grasselli, Margaret Morgan; Rosenberg, Pierre; Parmantier, Nicole; et al. (1984). Watteau, 1684-1721 (PDF) (exhibition catalogue). Washington: National Gallery of Art. ISBN 0-89468-074-9. OCLC 557740787 – via the National Gallery of Art archive.
- Hartnoll, Phyllis, ed. (1983). The Oxford Companion to the Theatre (4th ed.). Oxford et al.: Oxford University Press. p. 216. ISBN 0-19-211546-4 – via Internet Archive.
- Huys, Jean-Philippe (2011). "Princes en exil, organisateurs de spectacles: Sur le séjour en France des électeurs Maximilien II Emmanuel de Bavière et Joseph-Clément de Cologne". In Duforcet, Marie-Bernadette; Mazouer, Charles; Surgers, Anne (eds.). Spectacles et pouvoirs dans l'Europe de l'Ancien Régime, XVIe - XVIIIe siècle (conference papers) (in French). Tübingen: Narr. pp. 127–157. ISBN 978-3-8233-6645-4. OCLC 760246397.
- Lancaster, Henry Carrington (1945). Sunset: A History of Parisian Drama in the Last Years of Louis XIV, 1701–1715. Baltimore, MD: Johns Hopkins Press. OCLC 1151320593 – via Internet Archive.
- Lancaster, Henry Carrington (1950). French Tragedy in the Time of Louis XV and Voltaire. Vol. 1. Baltimore, MD: Johns Hopkins Press. OCLC 1149199512 – via Internet Archive.
- Lancaster, Henry Carrington (1966). History of French Dramatic Literature in the Seventeenth Century. Pt. IV: The Period of Racine, 1673–1700. Vol. 2. New York: Gordian Press. OCLC 1149373442 – via Internet Archive.
- Langlois, Gilles-Antoine (1993). "La Folie-Desmares à Châtillon". Dix-Huitième Siècle. 25: 457–482. doi:10.3406/dhs.1993.1943 – via Persee.fr.
- Lescure, M. F. A. de (1861). Les maîtresses du Régent (in French). Paris: E. Dentu. OCLC 797040364 – via Internet Archive.
- Lesné, Claude (1988). "Jean-Baptiste Santerre, 1651-1717". Bulletin de la Société de l'histoire de l'art français: 75–118. ISSN 0301-4126. OCLC 888444852.
- Lesné, Claude; Waro, Françoise (2011). Jean-Baptiste Santerre: 1651-1717 (in French). Saint-Ouen-l'Aumône: Éditions du Valhermeil. ISBN 978-2-35467-088-7. OCLC 1194420634 – via the Internet Archive.
- Lyonnet, Henry (1902–1908). Dictionnaire des comédiens français (in French). Vol. 1. Genève: Bibliotheque de la Revue universelle internationale illustrée. pp. 525–526 – via Gallica.
- Mazenod, Lucienne; Schoeller, Ghislaine (1992). Dictionnaire des femmes célèbres, de tous les temps et de tous les pays (in French). Paris: Robert Laffont. p. 238. ISBN 2-221-05292-7. OCLC 1244581705.
- Mongrédien, Georges (1972) [1961]. Dictionnaire biographique des comédiens français du XVIIe siècle (in French). Paris: Centre national de la recherche scientifique. p. 59. OCLC 654213036 – via Internet Archive.
- Monval, Georges (1897). Les Collections de la Comédie-Française; catalogue historique et raisonné. Paris: Société de propagation des livres d'art. OCLC 1048240692 – via Internet Archive.
- Nemilova, I. S. (1964). Ватто и его произведения в Эрмитаже (Watteau et son œuvre à l'Ermitage) [Watteau and His Works in the Hermitage] (in Russian). Leningrad: Sovetskiy hudozhnik. OCLC 67871342.
- Nemilova, I. S. (1989) [1973]. Загадки старых картин [Enigmas of Old Masters] (in Russian) (3rd ed.). Moscow: Izobrazitel'noe iskusstvo. ISBN 5-85200-017-5. OCLC 909190011.
- Pearson, Roger (2005). Voltaire Almighty: A Life in Pursuit of Freedom. New York: Bloomsbury. ISBN 1-58234-630-5. OCLC 1036919317 – via Internet Archive.
- Percival, Melissa (2017) [2012]. Fragonard and the Fantasy Figure: Painting the Imagination. London, New York: Routledge. ISBN 978-1-4094-0137-7.
- Petitfils, Jean-Christian (2001) [1986]. Le Régent (in French). Paris: Fayard. ISBN 2-213-01738-7.
- Pevitt, Christine (1997). Philippe, duc d'Orleans. New York: Atlantic Monthly Press. ISBN 0-87113-695-3. OCLC 1150973261 – via Internet Archive.
- Roman d'Amat, Jean-Charles (1965). "Desmares (Christine-Antoinette-Charlotte)". In Roman d'Amat, Jean-Charles & Limouzin-Lamot, Roger (eds.). Dictionnaire de biographie française. Vol. 10. Paris: Letouzey et Ané. cols. 1434–1435.
- Rougemont, Martine de (1988). La vie théâtrale en France au XVIIIe siècle. Paris: Champion-Slatkine. ISBN 2-05-100998-8. OCLC 1150244224 – via Internet Archive.
- Schéfer, Gaston (September 1896). "Les Portraits dans l'oeuvre de Watteau". Gazette des Beaux-Arts (in French) (471): 177–189 – via Internet Archive.
- Scott, Virginia (2010). Women on the Stage in Early Modern France: 1540–1750. Cambridge, New York etc.: Cambridge University Press. ISBN 978-0-521-89675-7.
- Standen, Edith Appleton (1985). European Post-medieval Tapestries and Related Hangings in the Metropolitan Museum of Art. Vol. 1. New York: Metropolitan Museum of Art. ISBN 0-87099-406-9 – via Internet Archive.
- Wise, Susan; Warner, Malcolm (1996). French and British Paintings from 1600 to 1800 in the Art Institute of Chicago: a Catalogue of the Collection. Chicago: Art Institute of Chicago, Princeton University Press. ISBN 0-86559-137-7 – via Internet Archive.
