= Polish Woman =

Painting attributed to Antoine Watteau

- La femme polonaise (French), Polka (Polish)
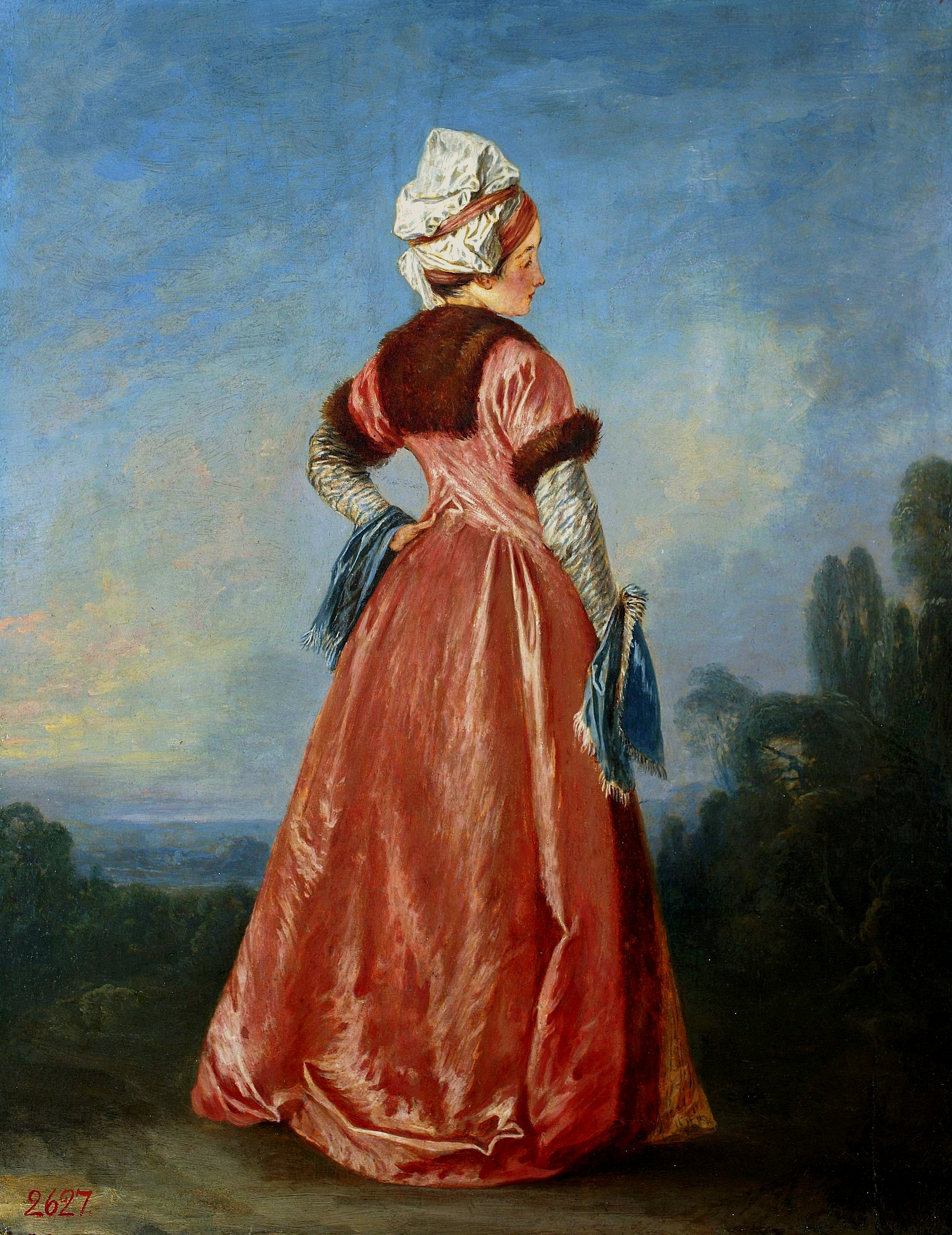
- Artist: Antoine Watteau (?); See § Attribution and dating
- Year: ca. 1710–1730s
- Catalogue: R 98; HA 56; EC 166; RT 80
- Medium: oil on panel
- Dimensions: 36.5 cm × 28.5 cm (14.4 in × 11.2 in)
- Location: National Museum, Warsaw
- Accession: M.Ob.697

Polish Woman (Note: Also called The Polish Woman and Polish Lady in English, and La Polonaise in French.) is an oil on panel painting in the National Museum, Warsaw, historically attributed to the French Rococo artist Jean-Antoine Watteau.

== Attribution and dating ==
The painting correlates to a presumably lost drawing by Watteau that is now known via François Boucher's etching published in 1726 as part of the Recueil Jullienne. Given that the painting is not signed, its attribution and dating remain uncertain; various authors either accept or reject the painting as a Watteau, dating it from the early 1710s to the early 1730s.

== Description ==
Polish Woman forms a single-figure, full-length composition that depicts a young woman standing amid a landscape, dressed in somewhat exotic attire, consisting of a long red gown with a fur garment and a white bonnet; it is a recurring subject that is also present in numerous paintings and drawings by Watteau such as The Coquettes and The Dreamer. Numerous authors thought the attire to be related to the so-called "Polish" fashion that was said to be present in France during Watteau's lifetime, hence the traditional naming is derived. There were also attempts to identify the sitter of the painting, who was notably thought to be Watteau's contemporary, the Comédie-Française actress Charlotte Desmares.

== Ownership ==
By the mid-18th century, the Polish Woman was owned by Louis Antoine Crozat, Baron de Thiers, nephew of the Parisian merchant and art collector Pierre Crozat; for one and a half centuries following the 1772 acquisition of the Crozat collection for Empress Catherine the Great. Polish Woman was among Russian imperial collections in the Hermitage in Saint Petersburg, and later in the Catherine Palace in Tsarskoye Selo, before entering the Hermitage again in 1910; after the Polish–Soviet War of 1920. The picture was ceded to Poland in 1923 under the regulations of the Peace of Riga. During World War II, the painting was seized for the collection of the prominent Nazi politician Hermann Göring, before being restored to Polish property upon the war's conclusion.

== Bibliography ==
- Adhémar, Hélène (1950). Watteau; sa vie, son oeuvre (in French). Includes L’univers de Watteau, an introduction by René Huyghe. Paris: P. Tisné. p. 208, cat. no. 56, fig. 33. OCLC 853537.
- Belova, Yuliya N. (2014). Закат барокко и утро рококо: Жак Калло и Антуан Ватто (in Russian). Saint Petersburg: State University of Industrial Technologies and Design. pp. 60–61, 63. ISBN 978-5-7937-1002-2.
- Brookner, Anita (November 1958). "Paris". Current and Forthcoming Exhibitions. The Burlington Magazine. 100 (668): 398, 404–405. JSTOR 872537.
- Cailleux, Jean (September 1962). "A Note on the Pedigree of Paintings and Drawings". L'Art du Dix-huitième Siècle. The Burlington Magazine. 104 (714): I–III. JSTOR 873756.
- Camesasca, Ettore [in Portuguese] (1971). The Complete Painting of Watteau. Classics of the World's Great Art. Introduction by John Sutherland. New York: Harry N. Abrams. p. 116, cat. no. 166. ISBN 0810955253. OCLC 143069 – via the Internet Archive.
- Dacier, Émile; Vuaflart, Albert (1922). Jean de Julienne et les graveurs de Watteau au XVIII-e siècle. II. Historique (in French). Paris: M. Rousseau. p. 134, cat. no. 334. doi:10.11588/DIGLIT.41977. OCLC 1039154548.
- Danielewicz, Iwona (2019). French Paintings from the 16th to 20th Century in the Collection of the National Museum in Warsaw. Complete Illustrated Catalogue Raisonné. Translated by Karolina Koriat, graphic design by Janusz Górski. Warsaw: The National Museum in Warsaw. pp. 346–348, cat. no. 279. ISBN 978-83-7100-437-7. OCLC 1110653003.
- Ficek, Agnieszka Anna (2020). "Courtly Figures: Collecting Meissen and the Creation of National Identity in the Court of Augustus II and Beyond". Studies in Eighteenth-Century Culture. 49: 283–296. doi:10.1353/sec.2020.0021. S2CID 229608068 – via Academia.edu.
- Germann, Jennifer Grant (2016) [2015]. Picturing Marie Leszczinska (1703-1768): Representing Queenship in Eighteenth-Century France. New York, London: Routledge. p. 184. ISBN 9781409455820. OCLC 1001961409.
- Goncourt, Edmond de (1875). Catalogue raisonné de l'oeuvre peint, dessiné et gravé d'Antoine Watteau. Paris: Rapilly. p. 240, cat. no. 352. OCLC 1041772738 – via the Internet Archive.
- Grasselli, Margaret Morgan; Rosenberg, Pierre & Parmantier, Nicole (1984). Watteau, 1684-1721 (PDF) (exhibition catalogue). Washington: National Gallery of Art. ISBN 0-89468-074-9. OCLC 557740787 – via the National Gallery of Art archive.
- Harclerode, Peter; Pittaway, Brendan (2000). The Lost Masters: World War II and the Looting of Europe's Treasurehouses (1st Welcome Rain ed.). New York: Welcome Rain Publishers. ISBN 1-5664-9165-7. OCLC 1036706652 – via the Internet Archive.
- Kajdańska, Alexandra (2019). "Eighteenth-century dance costume and etiquette in Gottfried Taubert's Rechtschaffener Tantzmeister". Tauberts "Rechtschaffener Tantzmeister" (Leipzig 1717) : Kontexte – Lektüren – Praktiken. Berlin: Frank & Timme. pp. 101–126. ISBN 978-3-7329-0428-0 – via Google Books.
- Lipgart, E. K. von (January 1910). "Императорский Эрмитаж – приобретения и перевески". Старые годы (in Russian). pp. 5–23.
- Mathey, Jacques (1959). Antoine Watteau. Peintures réapparues inconnues ou négligées par les historiens (in French). Paris: F. de Nobele. p. 18. OCLC 954214682.
- Nemilova, I. S. (1964). Ватто и его произведения в Эрмитаже (Watteau et son œuvre à l'Ermitage) [Watteau and His Works in the Hermitage] (in Russian). Leningrad: Sovetskiy hudozhnik. pp. 86–92, 173 n. 13, fig. 39. OCLC 67871342.
- Norman, Geraldine (1998). The Hermitage: The Biography of a Great Museum. New York: Fromm International. p. 170. ISBN 0880641908. OCLC 1149208999 – via the Internet Archive.
- Réau, Louis (1928–1930). "Watteau". In Dimier, Louis (ed.). Les peintres français du XVIII-e siècle: Histoire des vies et catalogue des œuvres (in French). Vol. 1. Paris: G. Van Oest. p. 38, cat. no. 98. OCLC 564527521.
- Roland Michel, Marianne (1980). Antoine Watteau: das Gesamtwerk (in German). Translated from the French by Rudolf Kimmig. Frankfurt: Ullstein. p. 94, cat. no. 257. ISBN 3-548-36019-X. OCLC 69202887 – via the Internet Archive.
- Temperini, Renaud (2002). Watteau. Maîtres de l'art (in French). Paris: Gallimard. p. 145; cat. no. 80. ISBN 9782070116867. OCLC 300225840.
- Weiner, P. P. von [in Russian], ed. (1923). Meisterwerke der Gemäldesammlung in der Eremitage zu Petrograd (in German). München: F. Hanfstaengl. p. 286. OCLC 741513217 – via the Internet Archive.
- Zimmermann, E. Heinrich [in German] (1912). Watteau: des Meisters Werke in 182 Abbildungen. Klassiker der Kunst (in German). Vol. 21. Stuttgart, Leipzig: Deutsche Verlags-Anstalt. pp. 37, 187. OCLC 561124140.
