= Catherine Dangeville =

French actress

Anne Catherine Dangeville (née Desmares; c.1685 - 1 July 1772) was a French stage actress. She was also known under her stage names Mlle Dangeville mère, Mlle Dangeville cadette or Mme Antoine.

== Life ==
She was the daughter of Nicolas Desmares and Anne d'Ennebault - her father's sister was Marie Champmeslé, whilst her own elder sister was Charlotte Desmares. She made her début on 23 December 1707 as Pauline in Polyeucte with the Comédie-Française company, which received her as a full member on 5 January 1708 by order of the court. She retired with a pension on 21 December 1712.

She married Antoine-François Botot Dangeville, a dancing master and member of the Académie royale de danse. They had several children, including the actors Étienne, François and Marie-Anne Botot.
