= Nicolas Desmares =

French comedian and actor (1650–1714)

Nicolas Desmares (Rouen, 1650 – Paris, 3 November 1714) was a French comedian.

A brother-in-law of Champmeslé, he also called himself "Champmeslé" and with his sister Marie Champmeslé, they joined the theatre of Rouen. His talent earned him a call to perform at the court of King Christian V of Denmark. Recalled to Paris by his sister, he was received 28 March 1685 "sans début" (without a period of trial) – an honour bestowed for the first time – at the Comédie-Française where he specialized in peasant roles, which he played in a superior and inimitable way. He retired with a pension of 1000 livres on 27 June 1712.

He married the actress Anne d'Ennebaut, granddaughter of Montfleury, who gave him two daughters, both later actresses and sociétaires of the Comédie-Française: Charlotte Desmares and Christine Dangeville.
