= Fêtes Vénitiennes =

1719 painting by Antoine Watteau

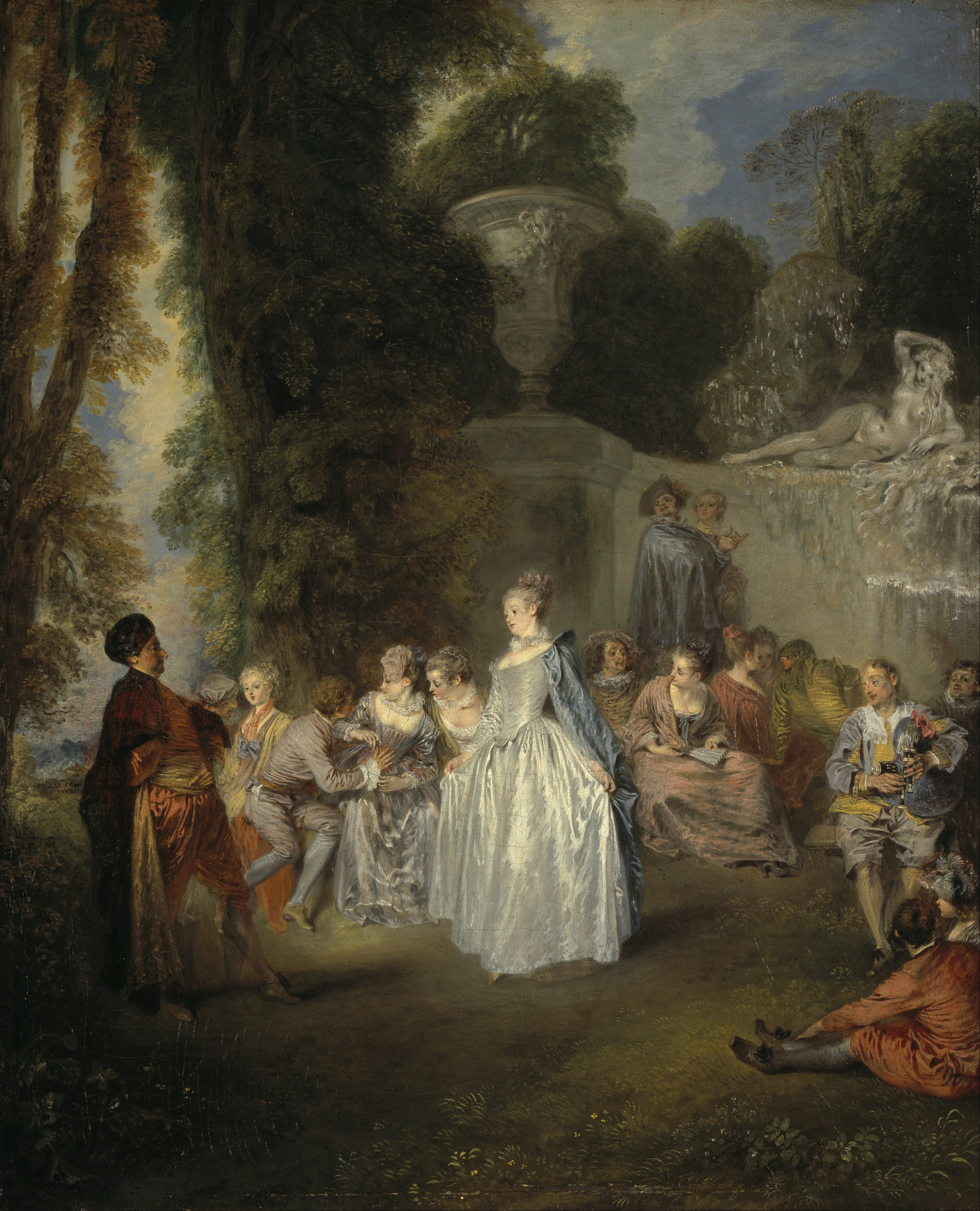
- Artist: Antoine Watteau
- Year: 1719
- Catalogue: H 25; G 135; DV 6; R 146; HA 197; EC 180; F A34; RT 96
- Medium: oil on canvas
- Dimensions: 56 cm × 46 cm (22 in × 18 in)
- Location: National Galleries of Scotland, Edinburgh
- Accession: NG 439

Fêtes Vénitiennes is a 1719 painting by Antoine Watteau, now in the Scottish National Gallery in Edinburgh, to which it was bequeathed in 1861 by Lady Murray of Henderland, widow of John Murray, Lord Murray. It takes its title from a 1732 engraving of the work by Laurent Cars and is derived from the Venetian styles of dress and dancing shown in the work, the former inspired by the commedia dell'arte. It belongs to the fêtes galantes genre created by Watteau.

The main dancer in the centre was thought to be the Comédie-Française actress Charlotte Desmares, a mistress of the Duc d'Orleans, whilst some identify the dancer in the black hat as the Flemish painter Nicolas Vleughels, a friend of Watteau. These two dancers are shown dancing a minuet, with other figures sitting in the background. These include a man courting a woman, two women talking to an actor and a presumed self-portrait of the painter as a musician holding a set of bagpipes – these had had a sexual symbolism since the Middle Ages, such as in Hieronymus Bosch's The Garden of Earthly Delights. Behind this seated group are two more people and a fountain.

== Description ==
The main dancer who occupies the center of the painting had been claimed by Michael Levey but never proven to be Charlotte Desmares, the actress with the Comédie-Française who was the lover of the Duke of Orleans, with whom she had had, in 1702, a bastard daughter, Angélique de Froissy.

The dancer in the black hat facing her has been identified as Nicolas Vleughels, Flemish painter, friend to Watteau, who rose to the rank of director of the Academy of Rome (1725–36). His clothing seems humorous and is perhaps inspired by Italian comedians, which would explain the title distributed by the engraver Laurent Cars.

Behind this couple dancing the minuet, sit a whole series of participants. The painter himself represented himself seated, as a musician holding a kind of bagpipe, also called a musette. Since the Middle Ages, the bagpipe was recognized as an instrument of sexual symbolism; Jêrome Bosch included it as such in his famous triptych of the Garden of Earthly Delights. Another cavalier is courting a lady and two other ladies are talking to an actor. Behind, we see another couple, standing in front of a fountain.

Watteau treats various materials in a similar way, both taffeta and water, people and statues, foliage and curls, thus succeeding in giving unity to the painting.
