= Nicolas Racot de Grandval =

French musician and playwright (1676–1753)

Nicolas Racot de Grandval (1676 – 16 November 1753) was a French composer, harpsichordist and playwright. He was born and died in Paris and was also named „Le Père Grandval“.

Although a respectable musician, at one time organist at St Eustache, his interests ran more to comedy, both in written comic dramas, such as the "Broken bed pot" and in musical comedy such as frivolous parodies on Clérambault's cantatas. His sister Marie-Hortense married the actor Charles Botot Dangeville.

== Works ==
Theatre

- 1693: La Baguette, comedy in 1 act and in prose, Théâtre-Français, 4 April
- 1697: Le Bourget, comedy in 1 act and in prose, Théâtre-Français, 23 May
- 1701: Les Trois Gascons, comedy in 1 act and in prose, Théâtre-Français, 4 June
- 1702: Le Bal d'Auteuil, comedy in 3 acts and in prose, Théâtre-Français, 22 August
- 1704: Le Port de mer, comedy in 1 act and in prose, Théâtre-Français, 27 May
- 1707: Le Diable boiteux, comedy in 1 act and in prose, Théâtre-Français, 8 October
- 1709: La Foire Saint-Laurent, comedy in 1 act and in verse, Théâtre-Français, 20 September
- 1713: L'Usurier gentilhomme, comedy in 1 act and in prose, Théâtre-Français, 11 September
- 1717: Le Prix de l'arquebuse, comedy in 1 act and in prose, Théâtre-Français, 1 October
- 1722: Le Camp de Porché-Fontaine, comedy in 1 act and in prose, Théâtre-Français, 9 October
- 1729: Les Réjouissances publiques, ou le Gratis, comedy in 1 act and in prose, Théâtre-Français, 18 September
- 1730: Le Divorce, ou les Époux mécontents, comedy in 3 acts and in verse with prologue, Théâtre-Français, 29 April
- 1731: Le Mari curieux, comedy in 1 act and in prose, Théâtre-Français, 17 July
- 1735: Les Acteurs déplacés, comedy in 1 act and in prose with prologue, Théâtre-Français, 14 October
- 1738: Le Consentement forcé, comedy in 1 act and in prose, Théâtre-Français, 13 August
- 1739: Ésope au Parnasse, comedy in 1 act and in verse, Théâtre-Français, 14 October
- 1742: Amour pour amour, comedy in 3 acts and in verse with prologue, Théâtre-Français, 16 February
- 1742: La Fête d'Auteuil, ou la Fausse méprise, comedy in 3 acts and in free verse, Théâtre-Français, 23 August
- 1743: Zénéïde, comedy in 1 act and in verse, Théâtre-Français, 13 May
- 1744: L'Algérien, ou les Muses comédiennes, comédie-ballet in 3 acts and in verse with prologue, Théâtre-Français, 15 September
- 1744: Le Quartier d'hiver, comedy in 1 act and in verse, Théâtre-Français, 4 December
- 1745:L'Étranger, comedy in 1 act and in verse, Théâtre-Français, 9 August
- 1745:Les Souhaits pour le roi, comedy in 1 act and in free verse, Théâtre-Français, 30 August
- 1747:Persiflès, tragedy in 4 acts and in vers, Versailles, Théâtre des Petits cabinets, 20 December
- 1756:Agate, ou la Chaste princesse, tragedy
- La Chauve-souris du sentiment, one-act comedy, s. d.
- Le Pot de chambre cassé, tragédie pour rire ou comédie pour pleurer, dédiée à un habitant de l'autre monde, avec un discours préliminaire sur l'excellence des nouvelles découvertes en poésie, représentée pour la première fois à Ridiculomanie, capitale du grand royaume de Bavardise, à l'occasion du mariage du génie Pompon et de la fée Clinquantine, le 12 de la lune du verseau, remise au théâtre le 19 de la lune de l'écrevisse, l'an 30 depuis le renouvellement de l'ortographe, s. d. Attribuée aussi à Sulpice-Edme Gaubier de Barrault.

Varia

- 1732: Essai sur le bon goust en musique. Reprint: Genève et Paris, Minkoff, 1992.
- 1725: Le Vice puni, ou Cartouche, poem, with a slang-French lexicon [1723 par erreur de Barbier 1822 reprise in Quérard 1829], then a French-slang lexicon from some editions from 1725 or 1726 Text online of an unfaithful reprint of 1827
- 1746: Almanach des proverbes augmenté pour 1746. Composé par Cartouchivandeck

Music

- Comic cantata Rien de tout - recorded by Béatrice Mayo-Felip (Nicolas Racot de Granval, Cantates Sérieuses & Comiques dir. Iakovos Pappas, 2001) Patricia Petibon (Airs Baroques Français, 2002) and Dominique Visse (Cantates & Concertos Comiques 2010)
