= Charles Botot Dangeville =

French actor

Charles-Claude Botot, known as Dangeville (18 March 1665 or 1669 - 18 January 1743) was a French actor.

He and the dancing master Antoine-François Botot Dangeville were both sons of Jean Botot, a former procurer of the Châtelet de Paris, and his wife Charlotte Chantoiseau. Born in Paris, he made his debut in 1697 in a company funded by William III of England in The Hague, taking Dangeville as his stage name. The same year he made his début as a dancer in the Comédie-Française, where he also played his first comic roles. He was received as a sociétaire and married the comic actress Marie-Hortense Racot de Grandval, sister of Nicolas Racot de Grandval. He retired in 1740.
