= Antoine-François Botot Dangeville =

Antoine-François Botot, known as Dangeville (26 May 1681 – c.1737) was a French dancing master, dancer and ballet teacher.

== Early life and education ==
He was born in Paris. His brother was the actor Charles Botot Dangeville.

== Career ==
He made his début at the Académie royale de musique in 1701 and retired in 1748, although he remained a member of the Académie royale de danse until his death. Campardon lists Dangeville's roles

== Personal life ==
He married the actress Anne-Catherine Desmares in 1707, with whom he had two sons and a daughter, who all became actors – the most notable was the daughter Marie-Anne Botot Dangeville.
