= Oscar Brockett =

American theatre historian

Oscar Gross Brockett (March 18, 1923 – November 7, 2010) was president of the American Theatre Association. An American Theater historian, he was Dean of the College of Fine Art at the University of Texas in Austin.

== Background and education ==
He grew up in Hartsville, Tennessee; his parents were tobacco farmers. Brockett received his bachelor's degree from Peabody College and went on to do graduate studies at Stanford University, receiving both his master's and doctorate from the Drama Department. His master's thesis was about the production history of Of Mice and Men; his dissertation was about satire in English Restoration comedies. Brockett's Stanford Professor Hubert C. Heffner remained his mentor for decades. Oscar married Lenyth Spenker in 1951, herself a writer and a scholar who collaborated with him on many of his projects.

== Teaching positions ==
His early, junior faculty appointments were at the University of Iowa, Indiana University, University of Southern California and then Bristol University in England. He started teaching at Indiana University Bloomington, Indiana, in 1963 and remained there for 15 years. The university with which he identified most and where he spent the largest part of his academic life was the University of Texas at Austin. Brockett served as the Dean of the College of Fine Arts (1978–1980) and taught Theatre Theory and Criticism in the Theatre and Dance department from 1980 until retiring in 2006. He headed the doctoral program, expanding it from five students to thirty.

He was recognized internationally as a historian of theater. Albeit at a time when essentially only professional theater was used as the standard by which to survey the historical development, his analysis of public performance spanned the totality of Western culture, from the Greeks to the 20th century. His "1968 book, History of the Theatre, has been used to teach American theater students for four decades." It saw more than a dozen editions and was translated into numerous languages: even editions in Hebrew, Persian and Korean appeared.

He died in Austin, Texas.

== Monographs and textbooks ==
Maintaining a conventional approach despite the changes in his discipline, Brockett succeeded in surveying often complex (and sometimes contradictory) research written by a staggering number of specialists: "Brockett managed to assemble a dense but fluid narrative, illustrated liberally with drawings, paintings, and photographs."

- Satire in English Drama, 1590–1603 (Dissertation, Stanford University 1953).
- A Bibliographical Guide to Research in Speech and Dramatic Art with co-authors Samuel L. Becker and Donald C. Bryant (Chicago: Scott, Foresman, 1963).
- The Theatre: An Introduction (1st edition, New York 1964) followed by several editions.
- Perspectives on Contemporary Theatre (Baton Rouge, 1971).
- Century of Innovation: A History of European and American Theatre and Drama Since 1870 with co-author Robert R. Findley (Prentice-Hall, 1973).
- Modern Theatre: Realism and Naturalism to the Present (Boston: Allyn and Bacon, 1982).
- World Drama with co-author Mark Pape (Fort Worth: Harcourt Brace Jovanovich, 1984).
- History of the Theatre (11th edition, 2017).

== As editor ==
- Theatre Journal
- Theatre and Drama Series
- Studies in Theatre and Drama; Essays in Honor of Hubert C. Heffner. The Hague: Mouton, 1972.
