= Jean Raoux =

French painter (1677–1734)

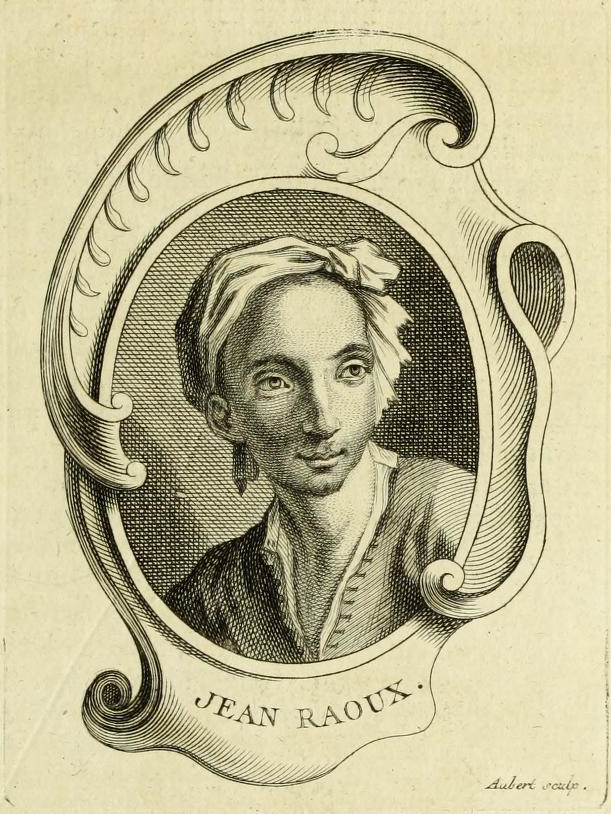
Jean Raoux, by Michel Aubert, from the 1752 editions of Dezallier d'Argenville's Abregé

Jean Raoux (1677 – 10 February 1734), French painter, was born at Montpellier.

After the usual course of training he became a member of the Academy in 1717 as an historical painter. His reputation had been previously established by the acclaimed decorations executed during his three years in Italy on the palace of Giustiniani Solini in Venice, and by some easel paintings, the Four Ages of Man (National Gallery), commissioned by the grand prior of Vendôme. To this latter class of subject Raoux devoted himself, refusing to paint portraits except in character.

The list of his works is a long series of sets of the Seasons, of the Hours, of the Elements, or of those scenes of amusement and gallantry in the representation of which he was immeasurably surpassed by his younger rival Watteau. After his stay in England (1720) he lived much in the Temple, where he decorated several rooms. He died in Paris in 1734. His best pupils were Chevalier and Montdidier. His works were much engraved by Poilly, Moyreau, Dupuis, etc.

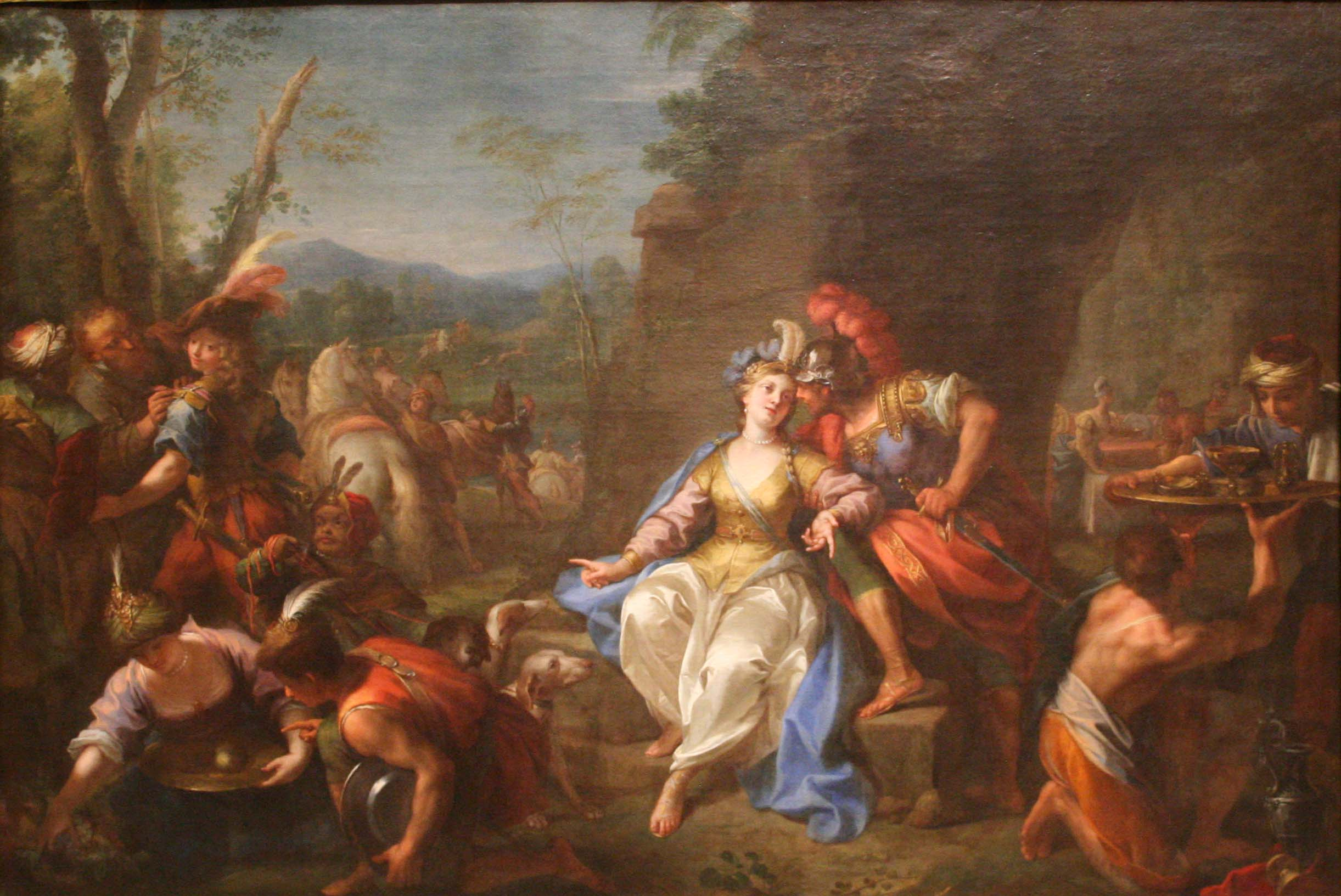
La chasse de Didon et Énée

== Gallery ==
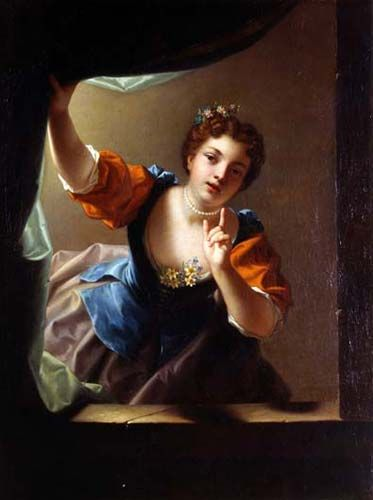
L'indiscrète (1728)

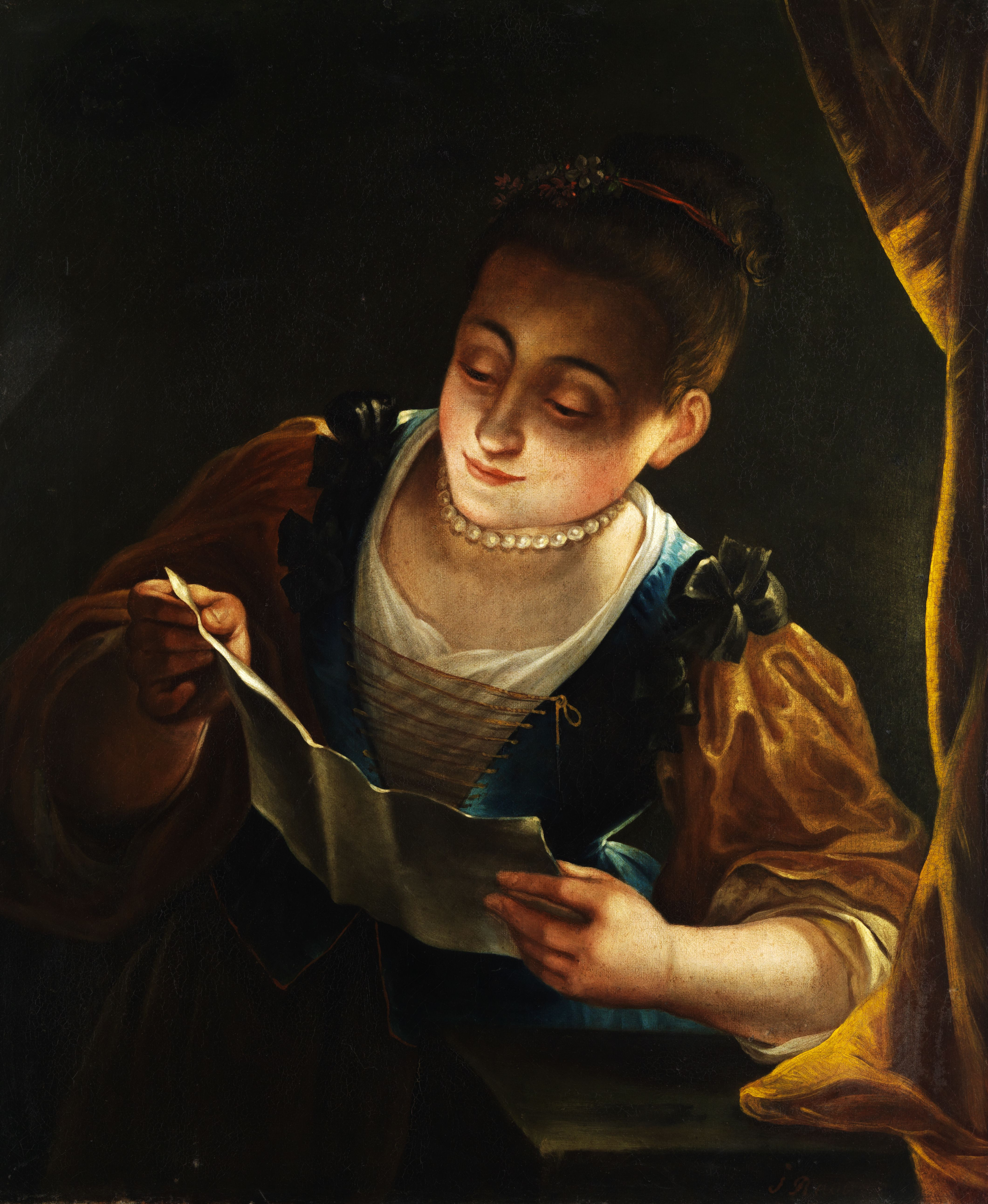
Jeune femme lisant une lettre II

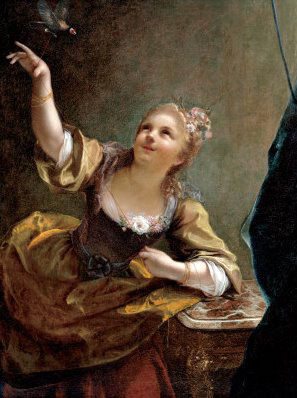
Jeune fille qui fait voler un oiseau (1717)

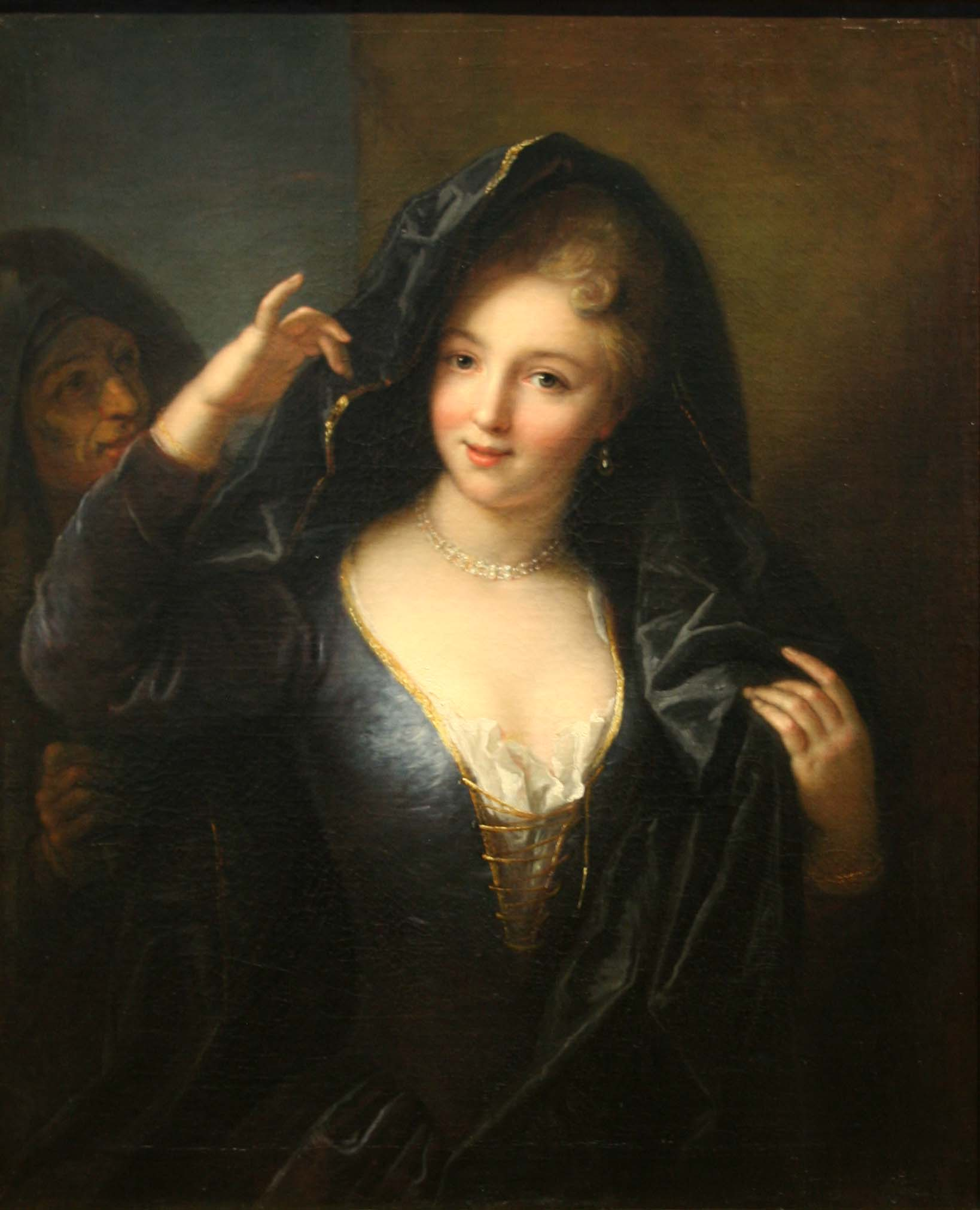
Jeune fille au collier de perles

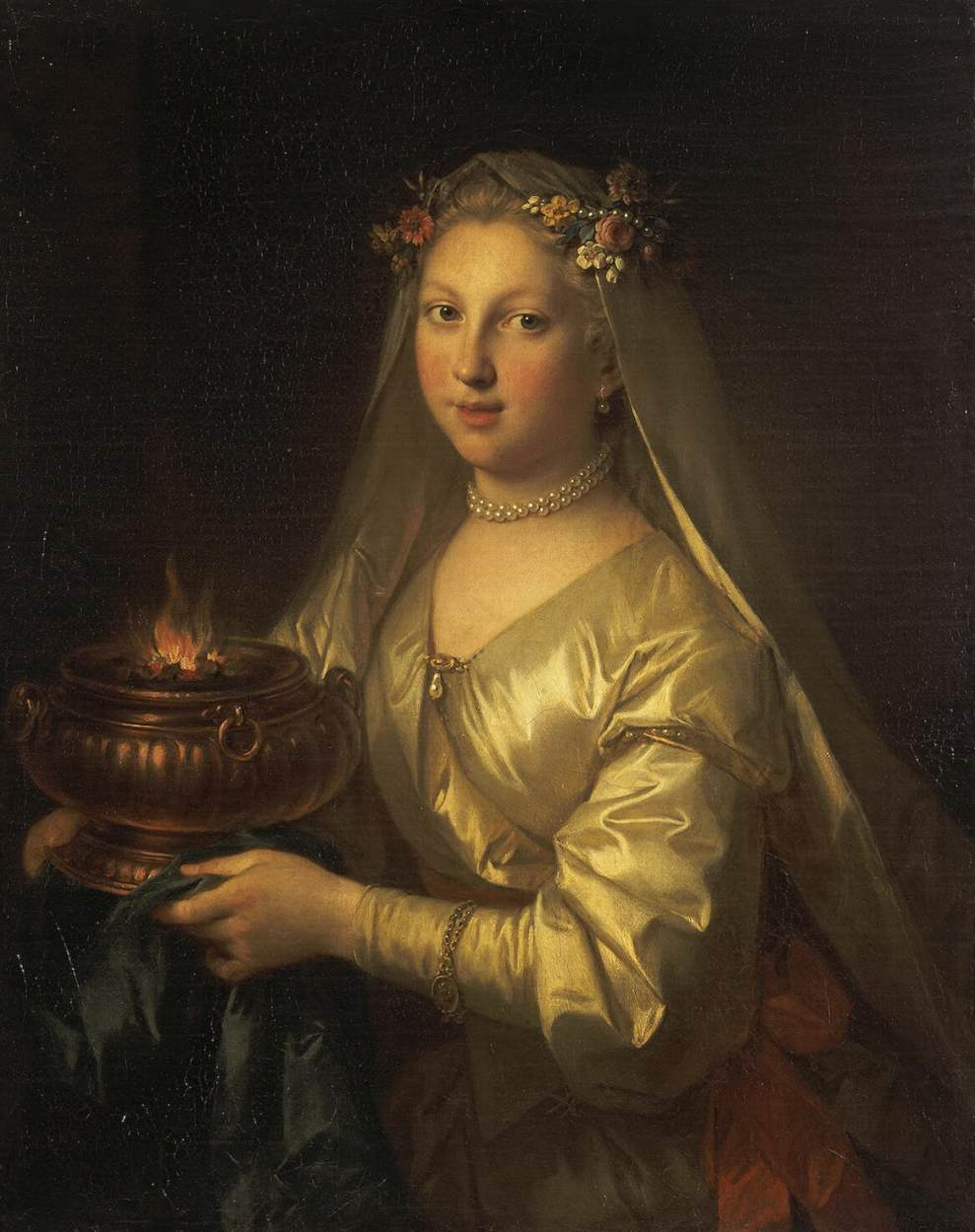
Vestal Virgin

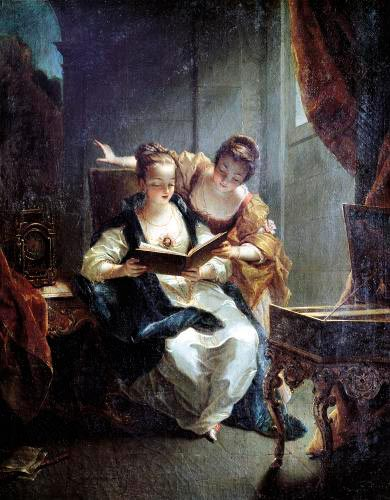
Les petites musiciennes

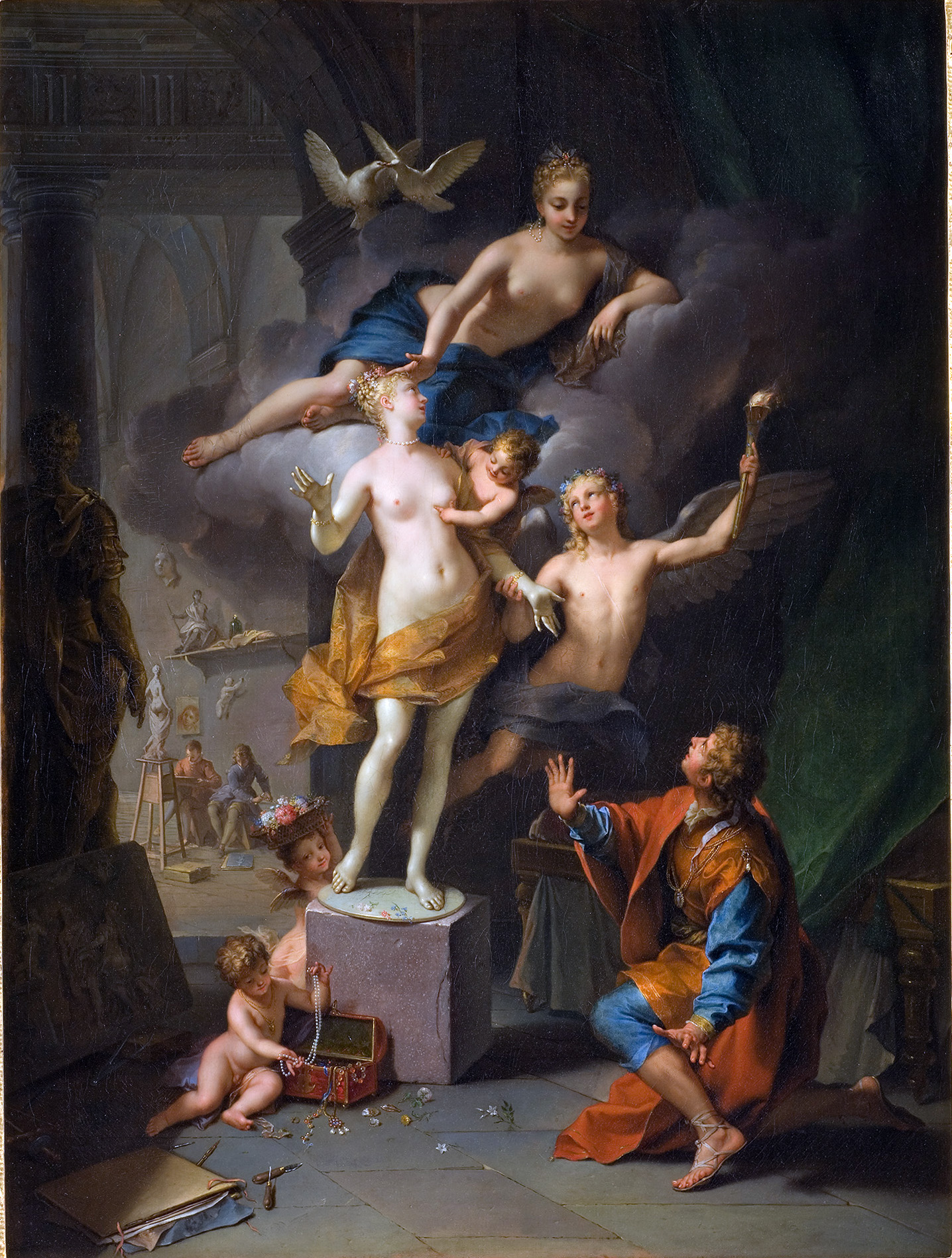
Pygmalion amoureux de sa statue (1717)

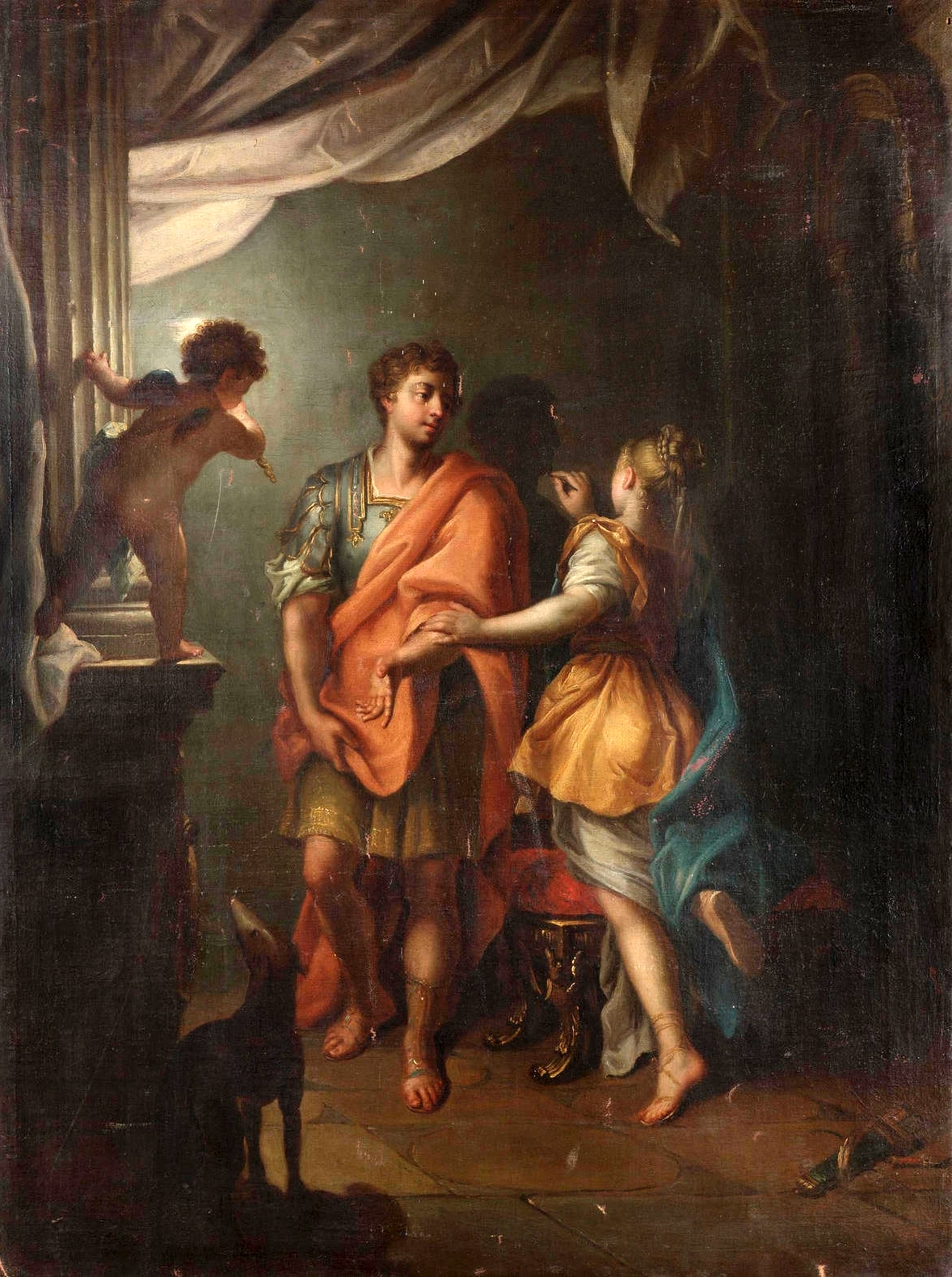
L'origine du peinture Dibutades Tracing the Portrait of her Lover

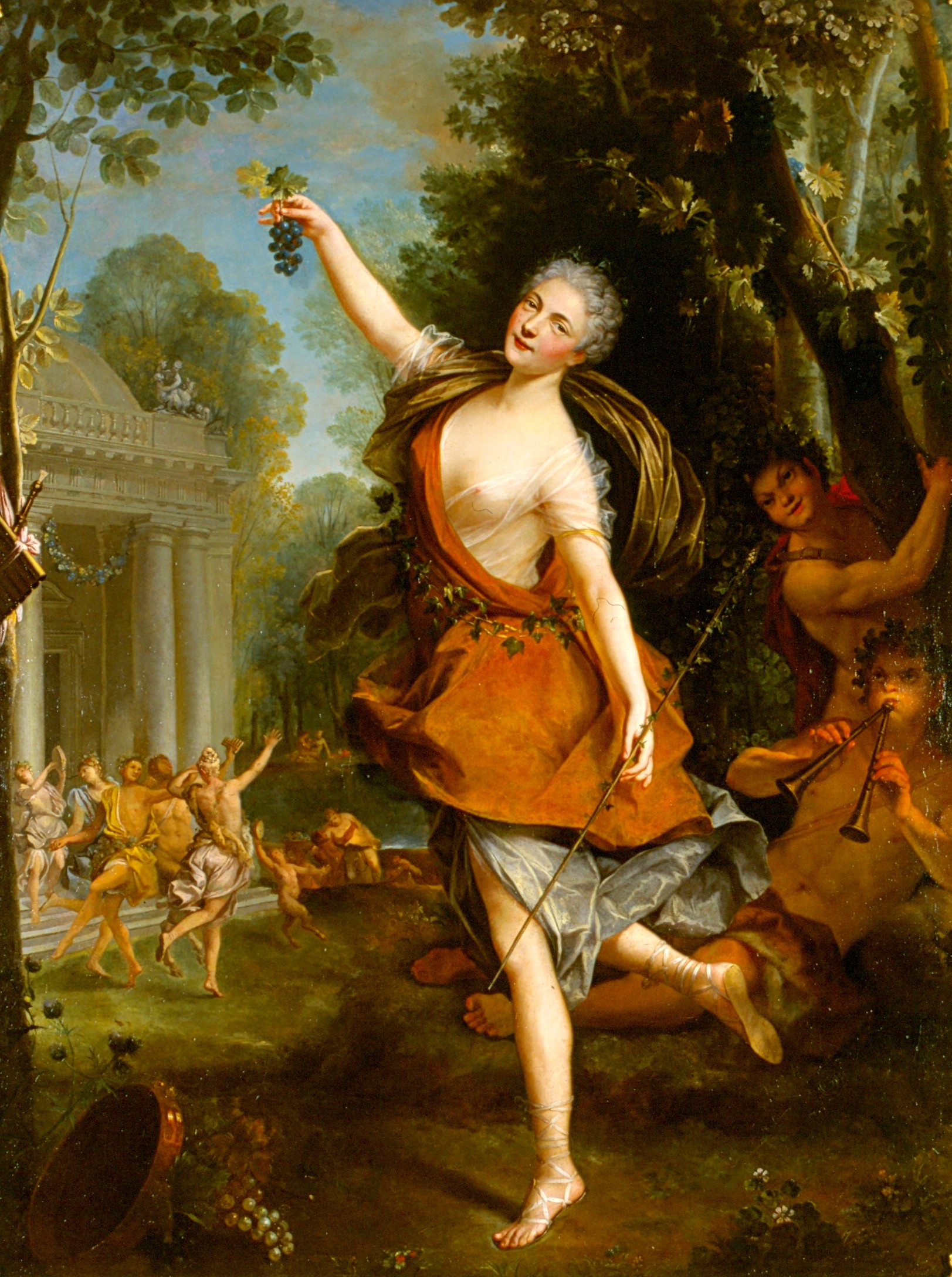
Mademoiselle Prévost, Bacchante

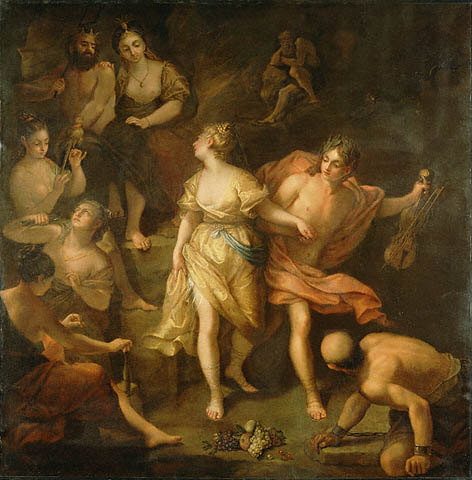
Orpheus and Eurydice (c. 1718–1720)

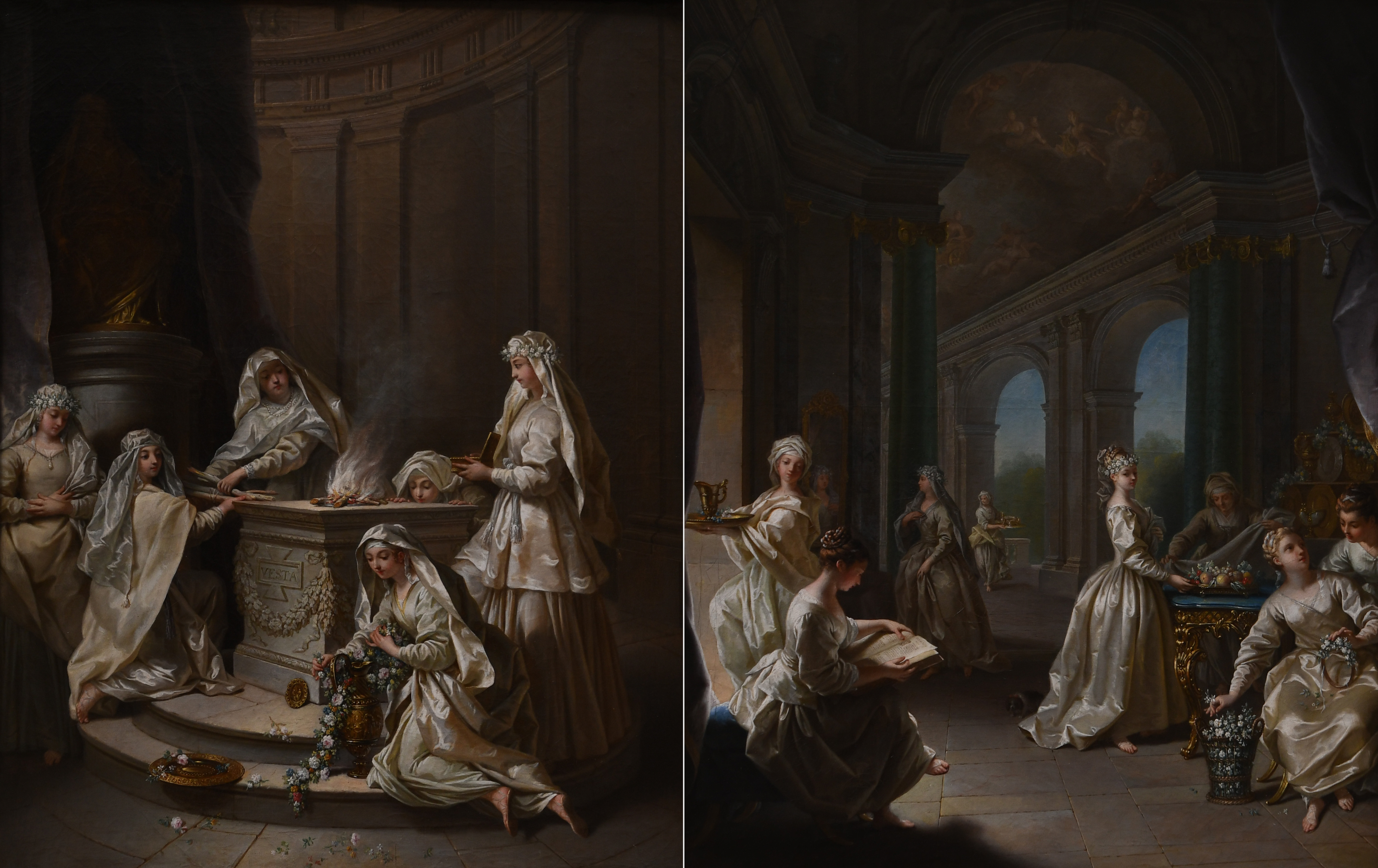
Antique Virgins (Left, 1727) and Moderne Virgins (right, 1728)
