= The Dreamer (painting) =

Painting by Antoine Watteau

- La Rêveuse (French)
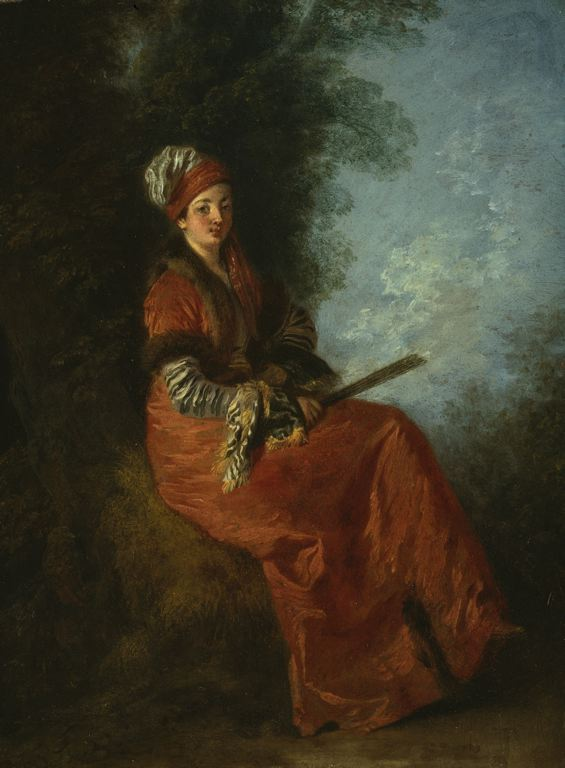
- Artist: Antoine Watteau
- Year: c. 1712–1717; See § Provenance and dating
- Catalogue: H 45; G 88; DV 166; R 100; HA 145; EC 165; RM 120; RT 79
- Medium: oil on panel
- Dimensions: 23.2 cm × 17 cm (9.1 in × 6.7 in)
- Location: Art Institute, Chicago
- Accession: 1960.305

The Dreamer (La Rêveuse) is an oil on panel painting of c. 1712–1717 in the Art Institute, Chicago, by the French Rococo artist Antoine Watteau. The painting is a single-figure, full-length composition that shows a seated young woman amid a landscape, dressed in somewhat an exotic attire consisting of long red gown with fur garment and white bonnet; it is a recurring subject that is also present in numerous paintings and drawings by Watteau such as The Coquettes, dit Actors of the Comédie-Française. There were attempts to identify the sitter of the painting, who was notably thought to be Watteau's contemporary, the Comédie-Française actress Charlotte Desmares.

In the early 18th century, The Dreamer belonged to the Abbé Pierre-Maurice Haranger, canon at the Saint-Germain l'Auxerrois who was one of Watteau's closest friends. During two centuries, the painting passed through various private collections, until coming into possession of the art dealer and connoisseur Georges Wildenstein, who sold it to the Art Institute of Chicago in 1960.

== Exhibition history ==
List of major exhibitions featuring the work
Year	Title	Location	Cat. no.
1874	Ouvrages de peinture exposés au profit de la colonisation de l’Algérie par les Alsaciens-Lorrains au Palais de la Présidence ou Corps législatif…	Société de protection des alsaciens et lorrains demeurés français, Paris	526
1883–1884	L’Art du XVIIIe siècle	Galerie Georges Petit, Paris	145
1943	Fashion in Headdress 1450 - 1943	Wildenstein & Company Building, New York City	36
1956	De Watteau a Prud’hon	Gazette des Beaux-Arts, Paris	95
1959	Age of Elegance: The Rococo and its Effect	Museum of Art, Baltimore	35
1975	The Age of Louis XV: French Painting 1710-1774	Museum of Art, Toledo	120
1976	Selected Works of 18th Century French Art in the Collections of the Art Institute of Chicago	Art Institute, Chicago	2
1984–1985	Watteau 1684–1721	National Gallery of Art, Washington, D.C.; Galeries nationales du Grand Palais, Paris; Charlottenburg Palace, Berlin	P. 26
General references: Grasselli, Rosenberg & Parmantier 1984, p. 306, Wise & Warner 1996, p. 170.
