= Nicolas Vleughels =

French painter (1668–1737)

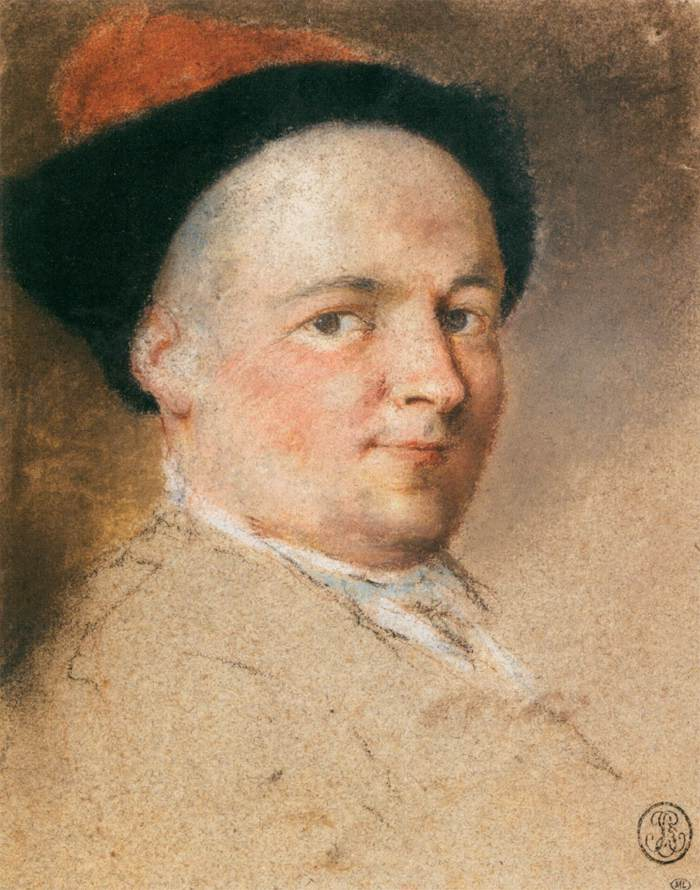
Self-portrait, c. 1714

Nicolas Vleughels (6 December 1668 – 11 December 1737) was a French painter. In his role as director of the French Academy in Rome, which he held from 1724 until his death, he played a pivotal role in the interchange between France and Italy in the first third of the 18th century.

== Life ==
Nicolas Vleughels was born in Paris as the son of the Flemish painter Philippe Vleughels, a native of Antwerp, who had emigrated to Paris. His father was part of a large community of Flemish artists residing in Paris. Nicolas Vleughels is said to have studied painting with Pierre Mignard. He also regularly copied works of Rubens. He only obtained the second prize of the Académie royale de peinture et de sculpture in 1694 and therefore had to fund his trip to Rome from his own pocket. His finances were not very good at this time. He was likely in Rome from 1703. Here he met the famous Dutch vedute painter Caspar van Wittel and the sculptor Pierre Le Gros the Younger at whose marriage he acted as witness in 1704. In 1707 he travelled to Venice where he became an admirer of the work of Veronese and some of his works inspired by Veronese were subsequently wrongly attributed to Veronese. It is not known how long he resided there.

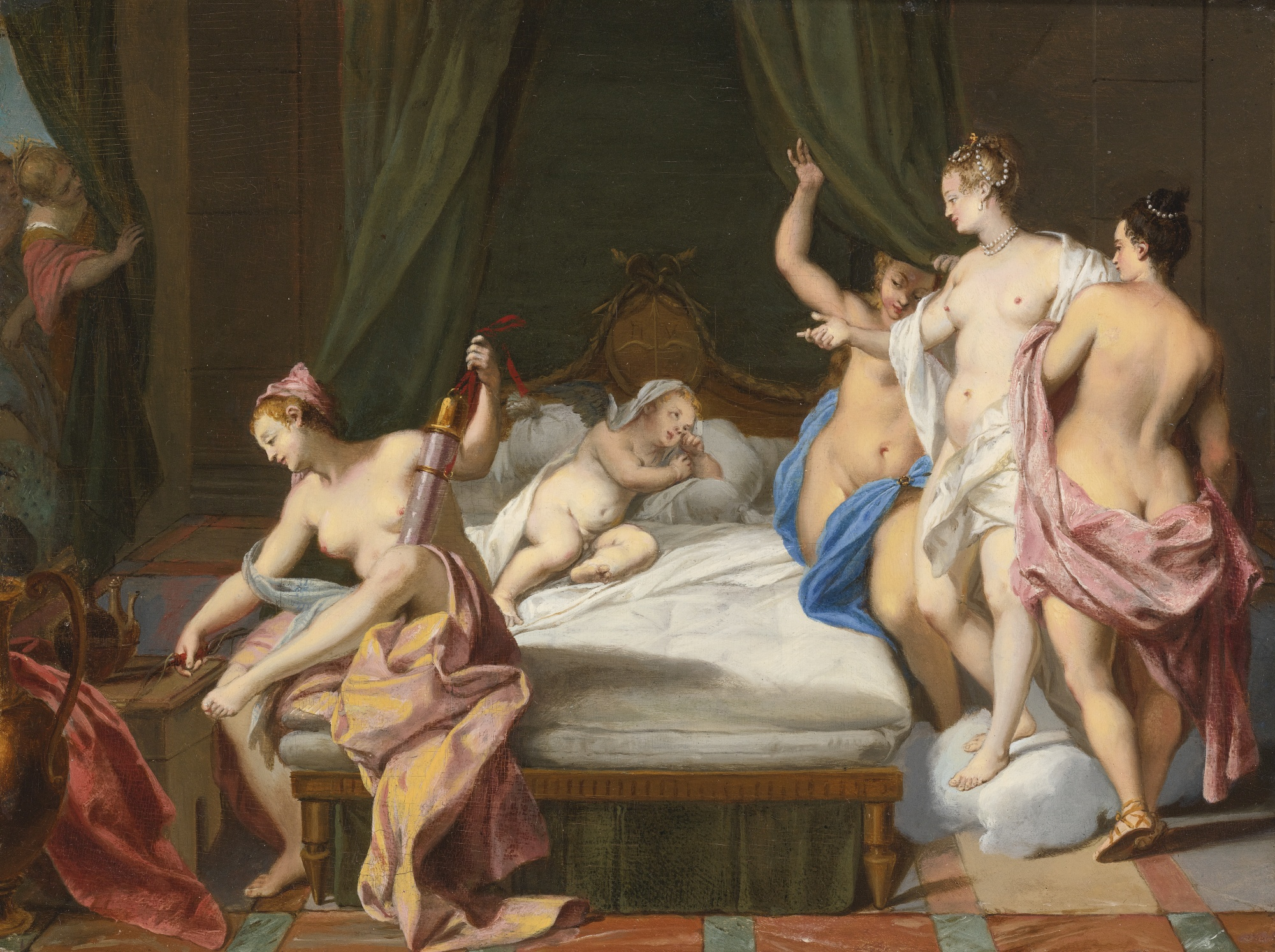
Venus and the Three Graces Tending Cupid

In 1709 Vleughels returned to Rome. The artist returned to Venice in late 1711 or early 1712. He was involved in the sale of the duke of Mantua’s art collection. Around 1712–13, Vleughels spent much time in Modena. Around 1715 he returned to Paris where in July 1715 he was received at the Académie royale de peinture et de sculpture. Back in Paris Vleughels became a close friend of Jean-Antoine Watteau. He lived with Watteau from about 1716 and shared a home in 1719.

In 1724 he was appointed co-director of the Académie de France in Rome. He thus became a pivotal figure in the interchange between French and Italian art and artists in the first third of the eighteenth century.
