= Champmeslé =

French actor and playwright (1642–1701)

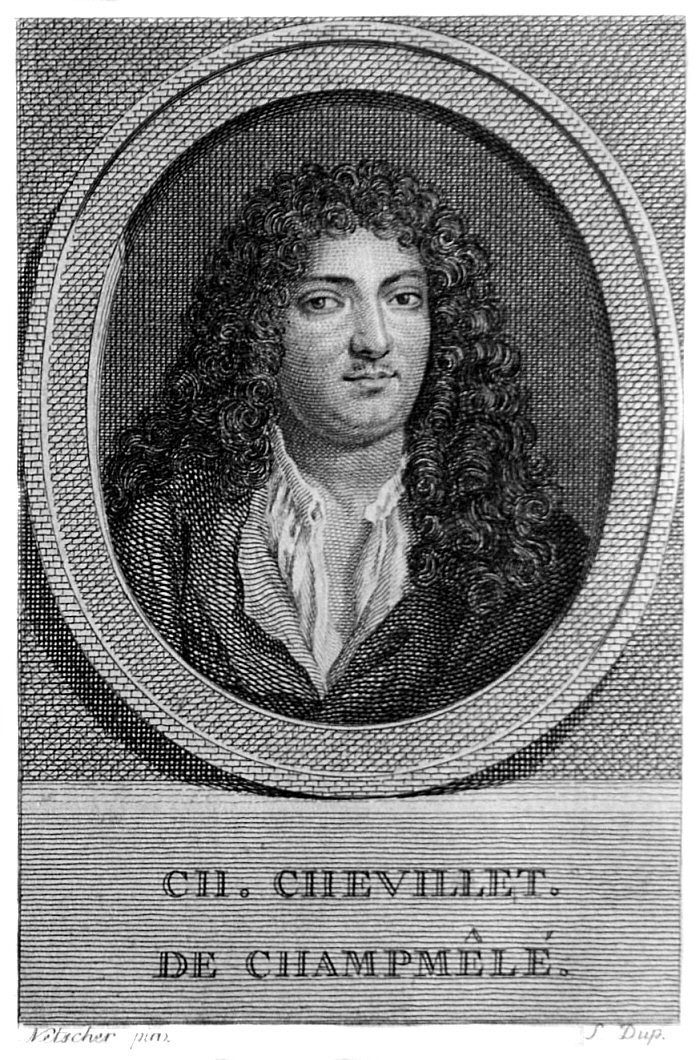
- Charles Chevillet de Champmêlé engraving after Netscher (1789). Image CÉSAR
- Born: Charles Chevillet; 20 October 1642; Paris
- Died: 22 August 1701 (aged 58); Paris
- Occupations: Actor; Playwright
- Spouse: Marie Desmares

Charles Chevillet, sieur de Champmeslé, (20 October 1642 – 22 August 1701) was a 17th-century French actor and playwright (see Troupe of the Comédie-Française in 1680).

== Biography ==
Champmeslé made his theatre debut in 1665 in a troupe of the province, and married Marie Desmares in Rouen on 9 January 1666. He then played at the Théâtre du Marais then at the Hôtel de Bourgogne and became one of the first sociétaires of the Comédie-Française.

When he died, coming out of a tavern, the priest of Saint-Sulpice refused the funeral service and Champmeslé was buried in the garden of his house in Asnières.

Champmeslé also wrote less than a dozen theatre plays, including some in collaboration with Jean de La Fontaine.

== Works ==
He wrote several comedies such as:

- Les Grisettes, 3 acts;
- Les Grissettes ou Crispin chevalier, 1 act;
- Le Florentin;
- La Coupe enchantée; these two last plays he composed in association with Jean de La Fontaine.

His Œuvres were collected in 1696.
