= Marie Champmeslé =

French actress

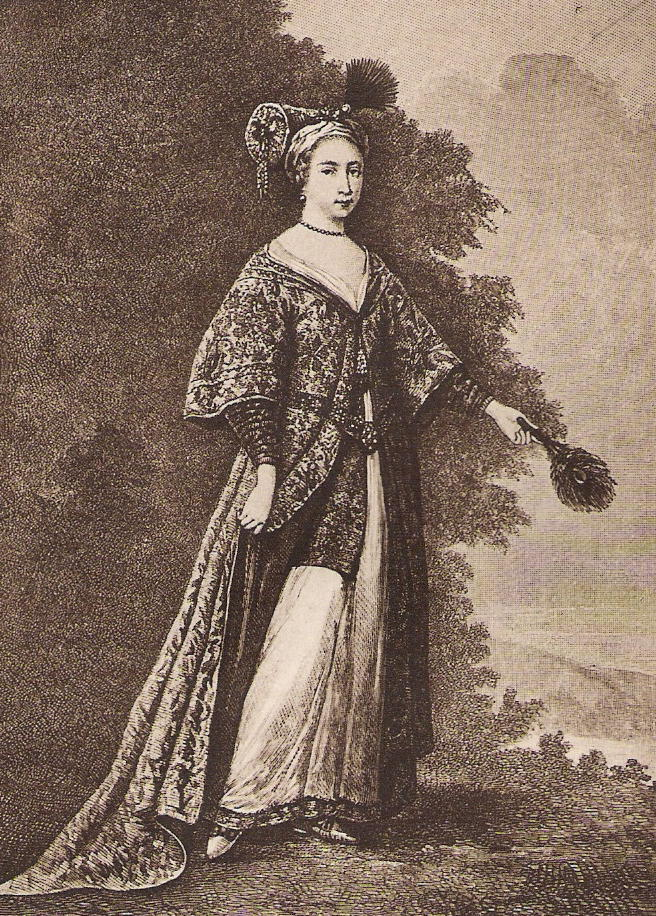
Marie Champmeslé

Marie Champmeslé (French pronunciation: [maʁi ʃɑ̃mɛle]; née Desmares [demaʁ]; 18 February 1642 – 15 May 1698) was a French stage actress.

== Biography ==
She was born in Rouen of a wealthy family; her father's name was Desmares. She made her first appearance on the stage at Rouen with Charles Chevillet Champmeslé (1645-1707), who called himself sieur de Champmeslé, and they were married in 1666. By 1669 they were playing in Paris at the Theatre du Marais, her first appearance there being as Venus in Boyer's Fête de Vénus. The next year, as Hermione in Jean Racine's Andromaque, she had a great success at the Hotel de Bourgogne.

Her intimacy with Racine dates from then. Some of his finest tragedies were written for her, but her repertoire was not confined to them, and many an indifferent play - like Thomas Corneille's Ariane and Comte d'Essex - owed its success to her natural manner of acting, and her pathetic rendering of the hapless heroine. Phèdre was the climax of her triumphs.

She and her husband deserted the Hotel de Bourgogne for the Théâtre Guénégaud. When the latter company merged into the new Comédie-Française, Phaedre was selected for the opening on 26 August 1680 (see Troupe of the Comédie-Française in 1680). Here, with Madame Guerin as the leading comedy actress, she played the great tragic love parts for more than thirty years.

During her career, "La Champmeslé" created a large number of famous roles. Besides those already mentioned, she did Bérénice, Ariane, Atalide in Bajazet, Monime in Mithridate, Iphigénie in Iphigénie en Aulide, and the same character in Oreste et Pylade. She left the stage in a vain attempt to restore her health at Anteuil, where she died.

La Fontaine dedicated to her his novel Belphegor, and Boileau immortalized her in verse.

== Family ==
- Her husband Charles distinguished himself both as actor and playwright.
- Her brother was the actor Nicolas Desmares (c. 1650–1714).
- Her niece, Christine Antoinette Charlotte Desmares (1682–1753), was also an actress.
