= Actors of the Comédie-Française =

Painting by Antoine Watteau

- Coquettes qui pour voir
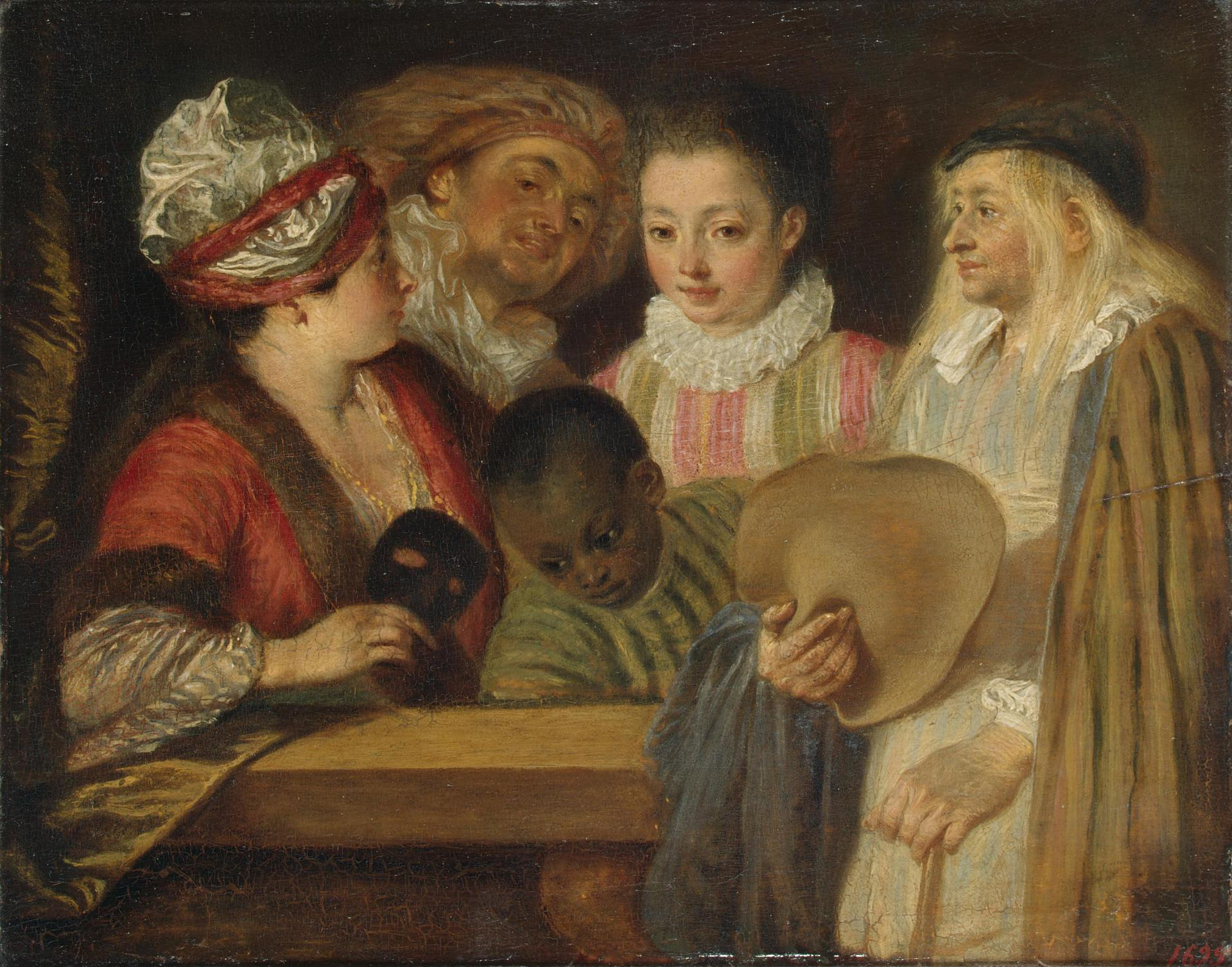
- Artist: Antoine Watteau
- Year: c. 1711–1718; See § Dating
- Catalogue: H 30; G 78; DV 36; R 107; HA 154; EC 162; F B32; RM 118; RT 77
- Medium: oil on panel
- Dimensions: 20 cm × 25 cm (7.9 in × 9.8 in)
- Location: Hermitage Museum, Saint Petersburg
- Accession: ГЭ-1131

Actors of the Comédie-Française, (Note: Russian: «Актёры Французского театра», usually translated into English as Actors of the Comédie-Française. For details on variant titles of the painting, see § Naming.) also traditionally known as The Coquettes (Les Coquettes; from Coquettes qui pour voir), is an oil on panel painting in the Hermitage Museum, Saint Petersburg, by the French Rococo artist Antoine Watteau (1684–1721). Variously dated within the 1710s by scholars, the painting forms a compact half-length composition that combines portraiture and genre painting, notably influenced by Venetian school, the Le Nain brothers, and Watteau's master Claude Gillot; one of the rarest cases in Watteau's body of work, it shows five figures — two women, two men, and a black boy — amid a darkened background, in contrary to landscapes that are usually found in Watteau's fêtes galantes.

For three centuries, there were numerous attempts to identify the subject and the characters represented by Watteau; various authors thought the painting to be either a theatrical scene featuring commedia dell'arte masks, or a group portrait of Watteau's contemporaries. Beginning from the late 20th century, Russian and Western sources accept a theory developed within the Hermitage Museum that holds the painting to be a group portrait of the Comédie-Française players who performed in the playwright Florent Carton Dancourt's play The Three Cousins. Given a variety of available interpretations, the painting has been known under a number of various titles; its traditional naming is derived from anonymous verses, with which the painting was published as an etching in the 1730s.

By the mid-18th century, Actors of the Comédie-Française belonged to Louis Antoine Crozat, Baron de Thiers, a nephew of the Parisian merchant and art collector Pierre Crozat; as part of the Crozat collection, the painting was acquired in 1772 for Empress Catherine II of Russia. Since then the painting was among Russian imperial collections in the Hermitage and, later, in the Gatchina Palace, before entering the Hermitage again in the 1920s; as part of the museum's permanent exhibition, it remains on display in the Winter Palace.

== Description ==
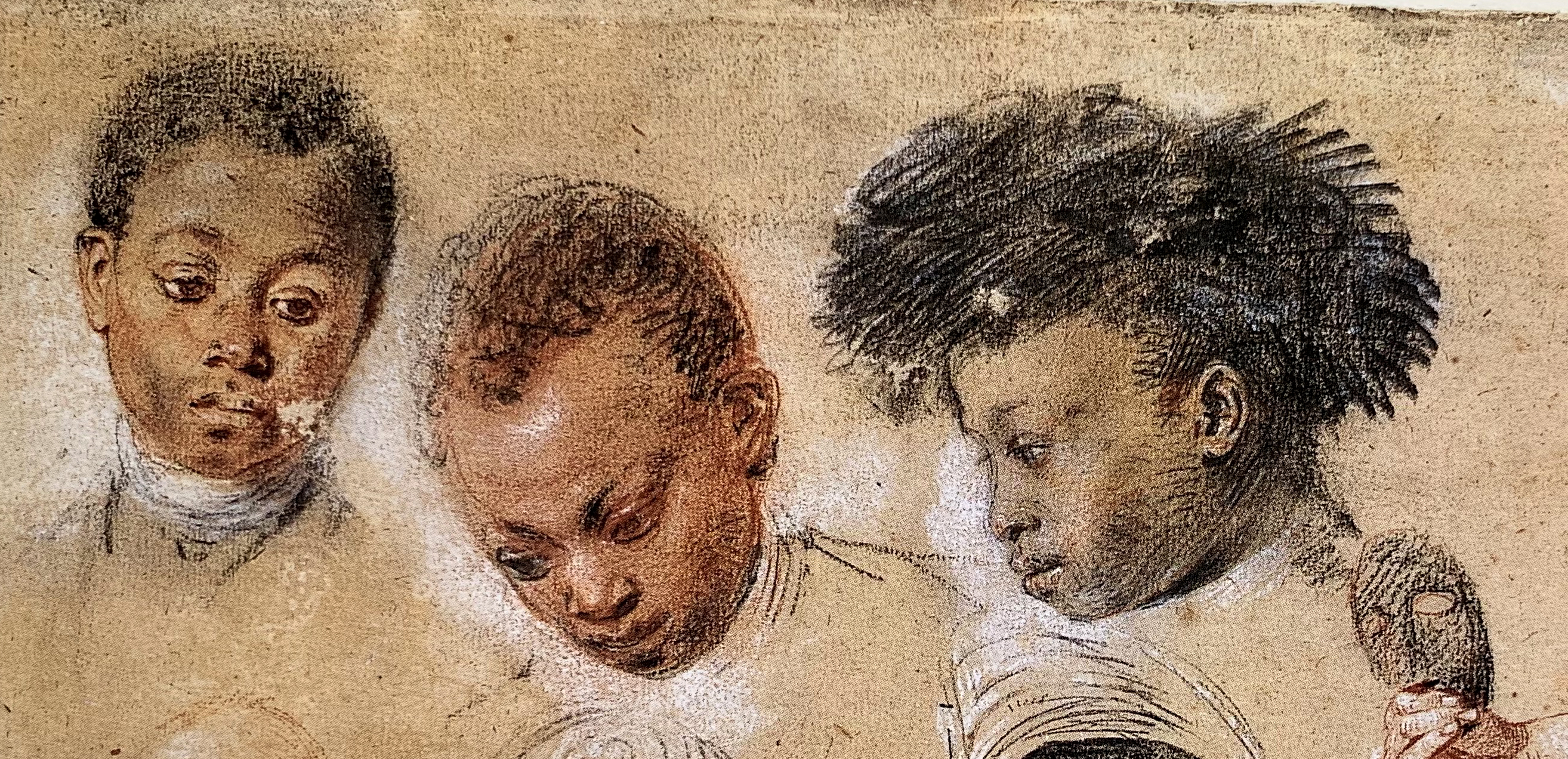
Study of the Black child at the center of the painting.

Actors of the Comédie-Française is an oil painting on a pearwood panel that measures approximately 20 by 25 cm. The painting is a compact half-length composition that shows five figures standing around a high wooden balustrade; most of the figures can be related to extant drawings, either directly or through comparable studies in Watteau's body of work. It has been noted by scholars that the half-length representation of Watteau's painting was influenced by Venetian painting; influences from French school such as the Le Nain brothers and Watteau's master Claude Gillot are also cited.

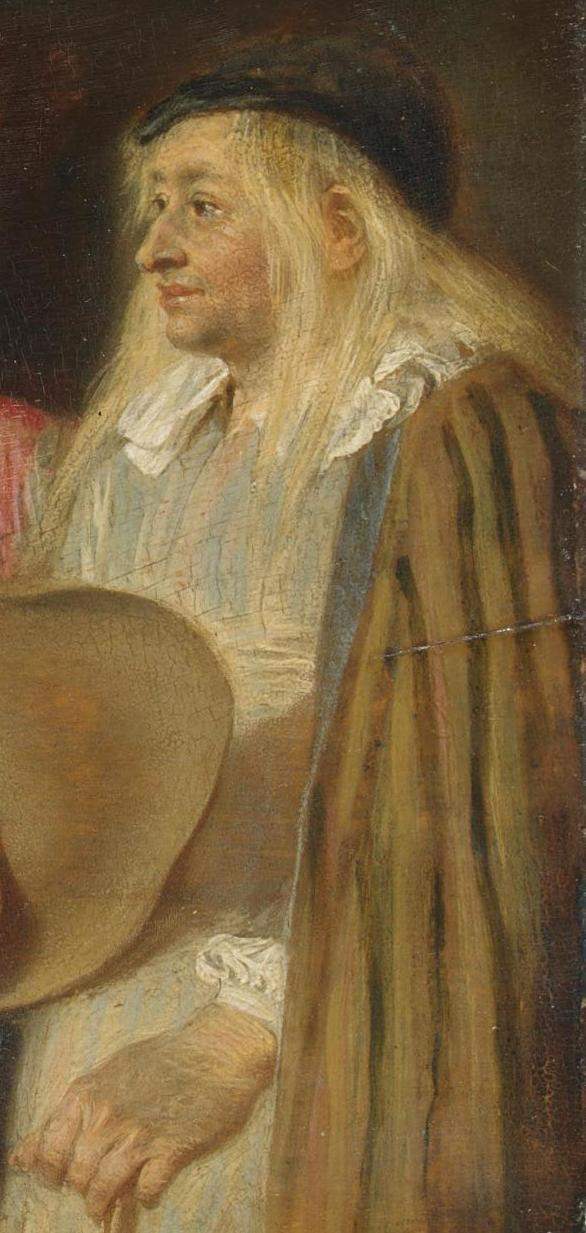
Detail showing the rightmost figure

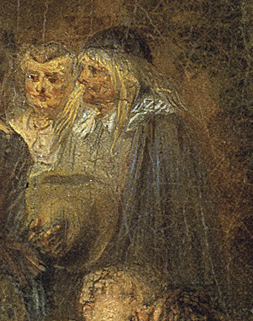
Detail from Watteau's Marriage Contract and Country Dancing, c. 1711-1713, Prado, Madrid

The rightmost figure is an outwardly old man dressed in a skullcap; he leans on a cane in the left hand, while holding a mushroom hat in the right hand. The figure is generally associated with an early full-length sanguine study (PM 64; RP 75), published as an etching engraved by Jean Audran (FDC 157); the earlier version of the subject was introduced by Watteau in Marriage Contract and Country Dancing (now in the Prado, Madrid) and L'Accordee du Village (now in Sir John Soane's Museum, London). It has been noted, however, that the study is probably a reduced version of a larger, more vibrant study drawn from life, similar to other studies such as the ones located in the British Museum, London (PM 84; RP 130), and in the Teylers Museum, Haarlem (PM 53; RP 135), respectively. Given the rendering of the hand holding the cane and the quality of the man's face, it has been suggested that Watteau relied on additional drawings for the painting.

By the balustrade's other side, a young girl is shown in a lightly colored, striped dress with ruff, standing behind a black boy servant in green-striped clothes; over the girl's shoulder, a head of a young man, dressed as Mezzetino, appears in a large motley beret. The girl and the boy's figures are usually related to a Louvre sheet of eight head studies, with the boy's head directly adopted into the Hermitage painting; the girl's figure is also thought to be related to the Louvre drawing, exactly a girl's head notably used in a version of The Embarkation for Cythera located in the Charlottenburg Palace. Young people of color were a recurrent theme in Watteau's paintings and drawings, possibly influenced by works of Paolo Veronese; these are also present in Les Charmes de la vie (Wallace Collection, London), La Conversation (Toledo Museum of Art), and Les Plaisirs du Bal (Dulwich Gallery, London). The head of the young man has no directly related drawings, but is notably present, with slight differences, in The Italian Comedians now in the Getty Museum, Los Angeles; the figure has also been associated by Nemilova with a head on a sheet of studies located in a private collection in New York City (PM 746; RP 456) and, to a lesser success, with a figure from a sheet now in the National Gallery of Art, Washington, D.C. (PM 665; RP 475), while Yuri Zolotov thought the head to be related with Il Capitano's figure present in the Louvre-owned Pierrot.

Opposite to the old man, the leftmost figure is a young woman turned to the right in profile, wearing Polish-styled red dress and white chipper, leaning on the balustrade and holding a black mask in the right hand; from the X-ray analysis, it has been found that she was to be bareheaded, wearing a different attire, and had to have her mask placed on the balustrade rather than holding it. Similarly to the old man's figure, the woman's figure has been related to an early, small, full-length study (RP 44) of a similarly dressed yet differently posed woman, that has been adopted into a more detailed drawing, later used in The Polish Woman, traditionally but not definitively attributed to Watteau (now in the National Museum, Warsaw). Various studies of women's hands holding masks have been related to the painting, with a study in the Kupferstichkabinett, Berlin (PM 828; RP 417), regarded as the closest. There is also a now untraced sanguine and black chalk study of the woman and the boy (PM 541; RP R591) that closely corresponds, albeit in reverse, with the painting; Parker and Mathey, who attributed the drawing to Watteau, considered it to be a preliminary study, and so did Nemilova and, during the 1984–1985 exhibition, Rosenberg; however, Eidelberg rejected that relation, as well as the sheet's authenticity, pointing out that the drawing is more corresponding to the etching rather than to the painting; in the 1996 catalogue raisonné, Rosenberg and Louis-Antoine Prat also list the sheet as rejected.

The painting is generally in good condition, despite losses and restorations undergone in the past. Damages found by visual observations include a restored crack along the old man's cloak, to the right; cracks in shaded areas, more importantly along the lower edge and around the girl's head; and a loss painted in above the girl's left shoulder. X-ray analysis of the painting, performed by the Hermitage scholars in the 1970s, also revealed alterations made to the leftmost figure during the painting's production: the woman was to be bare-headed rather than wearing the bonnet, and was to wear a free-flowing costume with horizontal stripes, different from a Polish-styled one found in the final painting; her hand didn't hold the mask, but lay on the banister.

== Identity of the subject ==
Until the middle of the 20th century, sources and studies on Watteau variously defined the work's subject. In notes to Pellegrino Antonio Orlandi's Abecedario pittorico, Pierre-Jean Mariette referred to the work as Coquettes qui pour voir galans au rendez vous (transl. "Coquettish women, who to meet gallant men go around..."), after the first verses of quatrains accompanying Thomassin's engraving for the Recueil Jullienne; Mariette thought the panel depicts "people in disguise for a ball, among whom is one dressed as an old man." François-Bernard Lépicié refers to the composition as Retour de Bal in a 1741 obituary of Henri Simon Thomassin, believing the figures to be returning from a ball; in contrary, Catalogue Crozat of 1755 and Dezallier d'Argenville fils described it as a depiction of masked figures preparing for a ball.

Later sources, more prominently in France and Russia, similarly had various definitions on the subject: Johann Ernst von Munnich refers to the work as Personnages en masques (transl. "Characters in Masks") in the manuscript catalogue of the Hermitage collection; the Hermitage's 1797 catalogue features the title The Mascarade, whereas the 1859 inventory registry features only the work's description—"two women, talking with two men, and a negro beside them". In his writings, Pierre Hédouin referred to the work as Le Rendez-vous du bal masqué, before Edmond de Goncourt's Catalogue raisonné... introduced the Mariette-mentioned title into common use.

In an 1896 article published in Gazette des Beaux-Arts, the French author Gaston Schéfer was the first to consider The Coquettes to be based on portrait drawings rather than being a theatrical scene. Schéfer suggested from an inscription under Boucher's etching after the Berlin drawing, found in a copy of Figures des differents caracteres held by the Bibliothèque de l'Arsenal, that the old man on the right of the painting was modelled after Pierre-Maurice Haranger, a canon of the Saint-Germain l'Auxerrois who was a close friend of Watteau; the lady in red was thought by Schéfer to be the Comédie-Française actress Charlotte Desmares, (Note: Christine Antoinette Charlotte Desmares (1682–1753) performed in the Comédie-Française from 1690 to 1721; at some point, she was a mistress of Philippe II, Duke of Orléans. According to François Moureau's article "Watteau in His Time" published in the Watteau, 1684–1721 exhibition catalogue, Desmares "had numerous reasons for meeting Watteau." Nemilova presumed that Watteau was introduced to Desmares by his friend, Mercure de France editor Antoine de Laroque.) based on comparison of the composition with Lepicié's etching of her portrait by Charles-Antoine Coypel. (Note: "L'étude n" 198, gravée par Boucher, nous représente le barbon de la Comédie italienne, posé de trois quarts, assis sur une chaise. Il est coiffé d'une perruque à cheveux longs. Une autre étude (n° 69), également gravée par Boucher, le figure de face, un large chapeau sur la tète. Sous l'étude n" 198, Mariette a écrit : « Portrait de l'abbé Larancher. » C'est ainsi qu'il est nommé également dans le Mercure. Mais il a effacé le nom et l'a corrigé par « Aranger », selon l'orthographe de l'Abecedario. Un prêtre sous un tel habit, voilà qui paraît surprenant; mais au XVIII^{e} siècle l'Eglise avait sa bonhomie. Watteau ne croyait pas plus faire œuvre de scandale en déguisant l'abbé Haranger sous la perruque de Géronte que Cochin en dessinant l'abbé Pommyer sous l'habit du Paysan de Gandelu. D'ailleurs, l'abbé Haranger avait une si bonne physionomie de théâtre que l'on rencontre son portrait sous un autre nom : « La Thourilère, La Thorillière. » Peut-être même une autre étude de l'abbé Haranger a-t-elle servi au vieillard du tableau des Coquettes. Mais ici la ressemblance n'est pas assez directe pour qu'on puisse rien affirmer. Ce tableau des Coquettes n'est probablement fait que de portraits, de ces têtes d'etudes que Watteau crayonnait sur ses cahiers. Quels portraits? nous l'ignorons. Tout au plus hasarderons-nous quelque supposition vraisemblable sur cette jeune femme au nez retroussé, aux joues rebondies, que l'on voit à droit, coiffée d'un grand bonnet oriental et qui rappelle Mlle Desmares, de la Comédie Française. Assurément, ce n'est pas la Pèlerine dont Watteau a tracé la frête silhouette dans les "Figures de Mode"; cette figurine est si menue que l'on a peine à distinguer sa physionomie. Mais le grande portrait de Lepicié nous donne assez exactement le visage et les formes abondantes de la comédienne pour que notre hypothèse soit autorisée.") Later in the early 1900s, playwright Virgile Josz presumed the painting to be a depiction of commedia dell'arte masks, with the old man as Pantalone, the women as Rosaura and Isabella, and the young man as Scapino; in later years, these points were adopted by a number of scholars (Note: Virgile Josz's description of Coquettes... had been notably represented in Russian literature in the early 20th century, adopted by authors such as Alexandre Benois, Valentin Miller, and Sergei Ersnt, as well as the Hermitage Museum's 1958 catalogue of the painting collection; it was present in Western sources, as well) Josz's contemporary Louis de Fourcaud considered figures to be a family group dressed for an elegant masquerade."

In a 1950 monograph on Watteau, Hélène Adhémar identified the lady in red as Charlotte Desmares, similarly to Schéfer; Adhémar's point was furthered in Karl Parker and Jacques Mathey's 1957–1958 catalogue of Watteau drawings; they concluded that the old man could be another Comédie-Française player, Pierre Le Noir. (Note: Pierre Le Noir, sieur de la Thorillière (September 3, 1659 — September 18, 1731), also called La Thorillière Jr. or La Thorillière fils, was the son of François Le Noir, dit La Thorillière, a prominent actor associated with Molière's company. He joined the latter in 1671 as a touring player, and passed into the Comédie-Française following its establishment in 1680; in 1684, Le Noir became a sociétaire of the Comédie-Française. Early in his career, Le Noir performed secondary tragic and comic characters, before going to a greater success into à manteau roles he played following the company-mate Jean-Baptiste Raisin's death in 1693. In November 1685, Le Noir had married Caterina Biancolelli, the Columbina of the original Comédie-Italienne and daughter of Domenico Bianconelli, the said troupe's Harlequin; he was also the brother-in-law to his company-mate, the playwright and actor Dancourt. Le Noir retired in August 1731, shortly before his death a month later; he was succeeded by the son, Anne-Maurice Le Noir.) In the Soviet Union, the Hermitage staff member Inna Nemilova supported these points, and also concluded the young man to be Philippe Poisson. In addition, Nemilova pointed out Desmares could be possibly depicted by Watteau in both versions of The Embarkation for Cythera, and also other canvas (Note: These include The Island of Cythera (The Embarkation's preceding work, now in the Städel Museum in Frankfurt), The Dreamer (now in the Art Institute of Chicago), The Polish Woman (copy in the National Museum, Warsaw), and the lost La Polonnoise engraved by Michel Aubert.) and various drawings.

== Provenance ==
In an article on the Hermitage's 1922–1925 exhibition of French paintings, published in the March 1928 issue of Gazette des Beaux-Arts, the Russian scholar Sergei Ersnt reported that according to an inscription found on the panel's verso, The Coquettes belonged to the painter Nicolas Bailly (Note: Zolotov 1973, p. 138, translated into English as Zolotov 1985, p. 98 and Zolotov 1996, p. 88, refers to the owner as N. Bolz which, according to Eidelberg 2019, may be an error in transcription from French to Russian.) (1659–1736), a curator of the royal collections who authored a 1709–1710 inventory of the paintings in possession of King Louis XIV; in 1984, Rosenberg said that he wasn't surprised about Ernst's report, given Bailly's relations within artistic circles. (Note: Grasselli, Rosenberg & Parmantier 1984, pp. 311–312, states that through his sisters Geneviève and Jeanne, Bailly was a brother-in-law to the etcher Simon Philippe Thomassin and the architect Jean Sylvain Cartaud.) The label has been deciphered as "N Bailly [prove]nant <...> de lonay aux gallery;" it has been noted that de Lonay was an expert mentioned by the Parisian merchant and art collector Pierre Crozat — once a patron of Watteau — in his last will and testament; in the early 1900s, Virgile Josz speculated that Crozat could once own the painting.

By the mid-18th century, The Coquettes came into possession of Louis Antoine Crozat, Baron de Thiers, Pierre Crozat's nephew; it was present in the 1755 catalogue of Crozat de Thiers' collection, and later in the 1771 inventory compiled by François Tronchin upon the collector's death. As part of the Crozat collection, The Coquettes was acquired for the Hermitage, then recently established by Empress Catherine the Great in Saint Petersburg. At some point in the mid-19th century, the painting was taken to the Gatchina Palace; it was present in the Oval Chamber, a personal room of Tsar Paul I in the palace's ground floor, where it was photographed in the early 1910s. In 1920, The Coquettes was restored to the Hermitage; as part of the museum's contemporary exhibition, the painting is on display in room 284, formerly the second room of military pictures in the Winter Palace.

=== Authorship ===
Authenticity of the panel has never been seriously questioned until the early 20th century, when the Russian art historian Nicolas Wrangel considered it to be a copy by Philippe Mercier, a prominent English follower of Watteau; in a letter to the German scholar Ernst Heinrich Zimmermann, who compiled an album and catalogue of Watteau's work, Wrangel pointed out that the blond actress lacks the coiffure seen in Thomassin's print, and there were also differences in the actor at the right. On the Russian fellow's advice, Zimmermann had classified the painting among the "doubtful pictures". In the early 1970s, the panel's authenticity was questioned in the four-volume survey edited by Jean Ferré that, based on Wrangel's doubts and inconsistency found in contemporary sources, listed The Coquettes as "attributed to Watteau." Later studies have ruled reservations out, given the work's condition as well as related drawings and Thomassin's print; in the 1960s, Nemilova presumed Wrangel have been led to his conclusion because of the painting's obscurity during its provenance in the Gatchina Palace; much later, Martin Eidelberg adds that Mercier could not paint with the same characteristics and artistic level Watteau had.

=== Dating ===
Dating of the painting remains somewhat imprecise, varying from early to late years of Watteau's career. In 1950, Adhémar listed The Coquettes as a Spring-Autumn 1716 work. In 1957, Charles Sterling suggested a 1716–1717 dating, while in 1959, Jacques Mathey proposed a relatively early date of 1714. Regarding aforementioned datings as too late, Nemilova dated the painting c. 1711–1712; (Note: Hermitage Museum 1958, p. 270, and Nemilova 1964, p. 182, date The Coquettes c. 1712. Nemilova 1970, p. 156, Hermitage Museum 1976, p. 189, and subsequent iterations of Nemilova's research (Zolotov 1973, pp. 139–140, translated into English as Zolotov 1985, p. 100 and Zolotov 1996, p. 88; Nemilova 1982, p. 133, cat. no. 45, reiterated as Nemilova 1985b, p. 445, cat. no. 348; Nemilova 1985a, p. 222), maintain a c. 1711–1712 dating. Claims of Nemilova's other or changed datings, notably by Camesasca, and later during the Bordeaux exhibition of 1980, are considered to be incorrect.) the Soviet scholar based her dating on comparing the painting with Du bel âge..., (Note: Du bel âge..., also called Le Concert, is a presumably lost painting that has been published as an etching by Jean Moyreau, announced for sale in the June 1728 issue of Mercure de France; in the Recueil Jullienne, Moyreau's print appears on the same sheet with Benoît Audran the Younger's etching after Les entretiens badins..., a Watteau painting that is also presumed lost. According to Goncourt, Du bel âge... was likely the painting formerly in Vivant Denon's collection, featured on the latter's sale in 1826. According to Dacier and Vuaflart, Du bel âge... and Les entretiens badins... appeared on the market at the Caissotti sale in February 1850; however, it was stated by Eidelberg that the Caissotti painting was a different composition from not likely Du bel âge..., for it featured six figures of commedia dell'arte masks, whilst Du bel âge... has only four. Adhémar and Posner dated Du bel âge... c. 1712, while Mathey used a dating not earlier than 1704–1705. Camesasca, who considered Du bel âge... and Les entretiens badins... to be pendants, used a 1710 dating.; translated as Camesasca 1971, p. 100 in the 1980s, Roland Michel dated the lost painting c. 1712–1714, thinking it to be a pendant to The Coquettes.) a lost painting by Watteau that is similarly a half-length composition, having compositional rhythm and visual features similar to these found on the Hermitage painting. In her dating, Nemilova also relied upon several other works attributed to the early 1710s by Adhémar and Mathey: La Conversation, The Dreamer, La Polonnoise, and Polish Woman; to Nemilova, who considered Polish-styled costumes to be fashionable in France during the early 1710s, in light of the then recent Battle of Poltava, the sitter's dress was the most important point for her dating.

In later publications, a variety of dating is also given. In a 1968 catalogue raisonné, Ettore Camesasca preferred c. 1717, a dating also used by Donald Posner and Federico Zeri. In the 1980s, Marianne Roland Michel attributed The Coquettes to c. 1712–1714, but later in 1984, she dated it c. 1714–1715, objecting Nemilova's dating as too early and not taking into account the psychological study of subjects. In the 1984–1985 exhibition catalogue, Rosenberg also dates it c. 1714–1715, and so does Mary Vidal. In 2000, Helmut Börsch-Supan chose a later dating to c. 1718, and in 2002, Renaud Temperini proposed c. 1716–1717; in a 2004 thesis, Belova proposes a c. 1717–1718 dating, based on her analysis.

== Related prints ==
In the early 1730s, Actors of the Comédie-Française was published as an etching in reverse, part of the Recueil Jullienne, by Henri Simon Thomassin. The print was notably mentioned in François-Bernard Lépicié's obituary notice for Thomassin that appeared in the March 1741 issue of Mercure de France, and later by Pierre-Jean Mariette in Notes manuscrites; in subsequent years, it served as a source to a number of pastiches.

Thomassin's etching was anonymously reproduced as a miniature print, captioned L'Amour, sous un déguisment.... A Favourite Sultana (also called Preparation for the Masquerade), an oval stipple print depicting the turbaned woman at the right of Thomassin's engraving, was produced in London in 1785 by Italian-born artist Francesco Bartolozzi, and has the misleading declaration "Watteau pinxt." Another engraving of the composition, called La Comédie italienne, was produced by Félix-Jean Gauchard after Thomassin's print, to accompany the entry on Watteau published in Charles Blanc's series Histoire des peintres des toutes les écoles. École français in 1862-63.

Mascarade (also spelled Masquerade), a mezzotint by French-born English printmaker John Simon, was mentioned by Charles Le Blanc and John Chaloner Smith in their respective studies, and was presumed to be a repetition of Thomassin's print by some authors (notably including Dacier and Vuaflart), given similarity in the number of characters.

Related prints
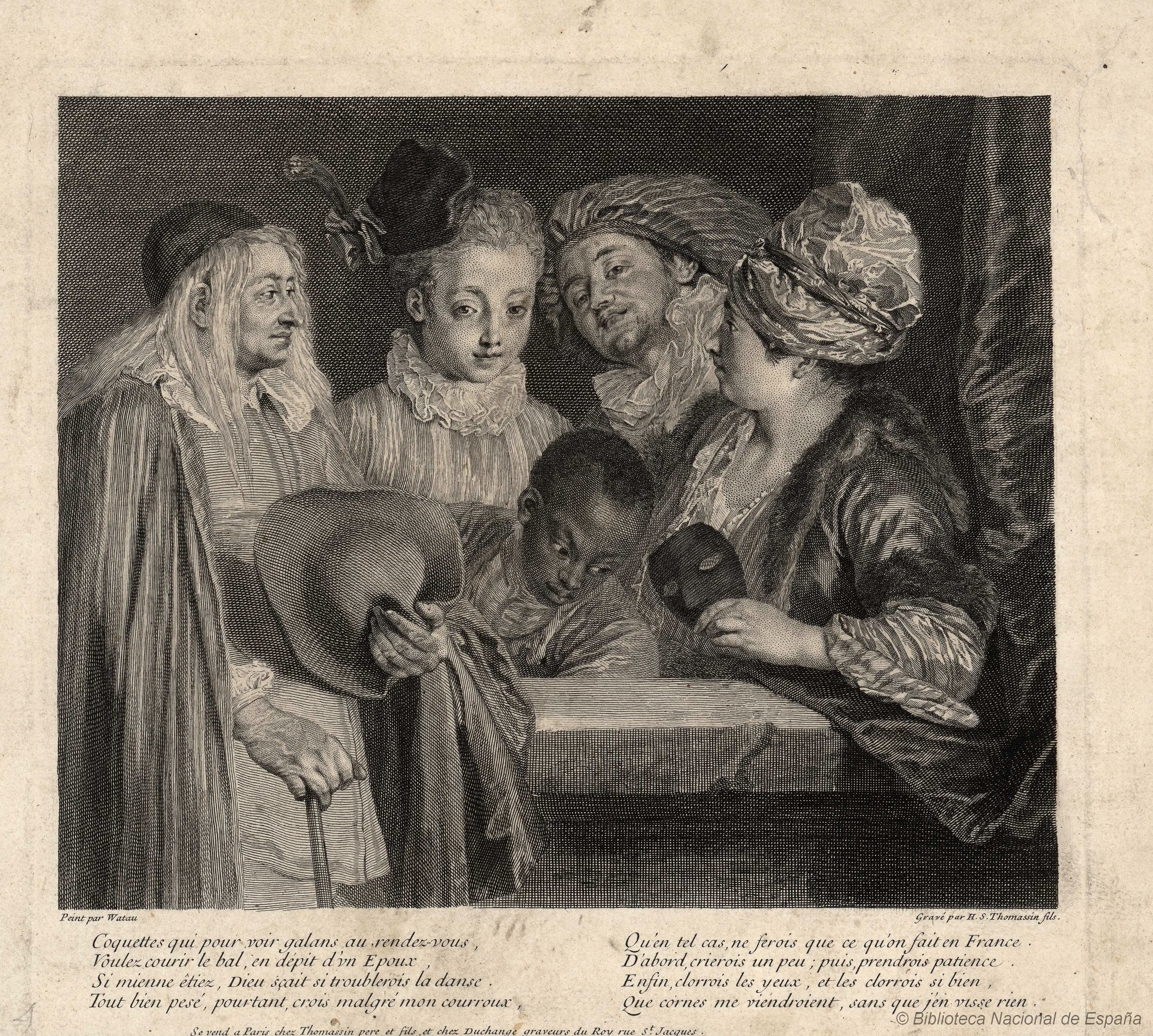
Henri Simon Thomassin after Watteau, Coquettes qui pour voir, before 1731, etching, Biblioteca Nacional de España, Madrid

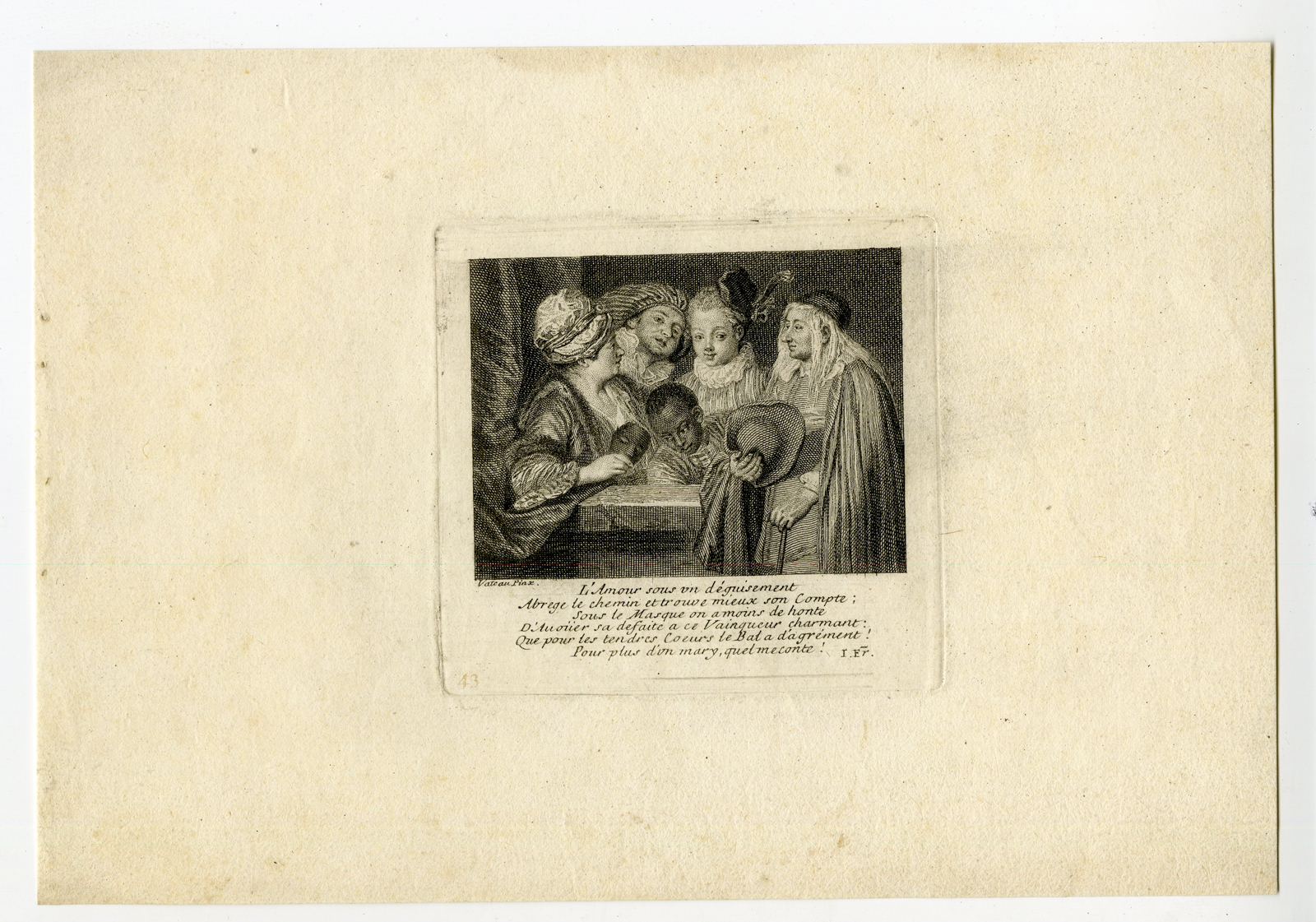
Anonymous artist after Watteau, L'Amour, sous un déguisment..., 1730s, etching

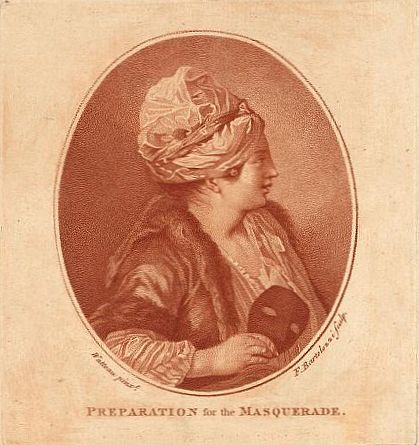
Francesco Bartolozzi after Watteau, Preparation for the Masquerade, 1785, stipple engraving, Hermitage Museum, Saint Petersburg

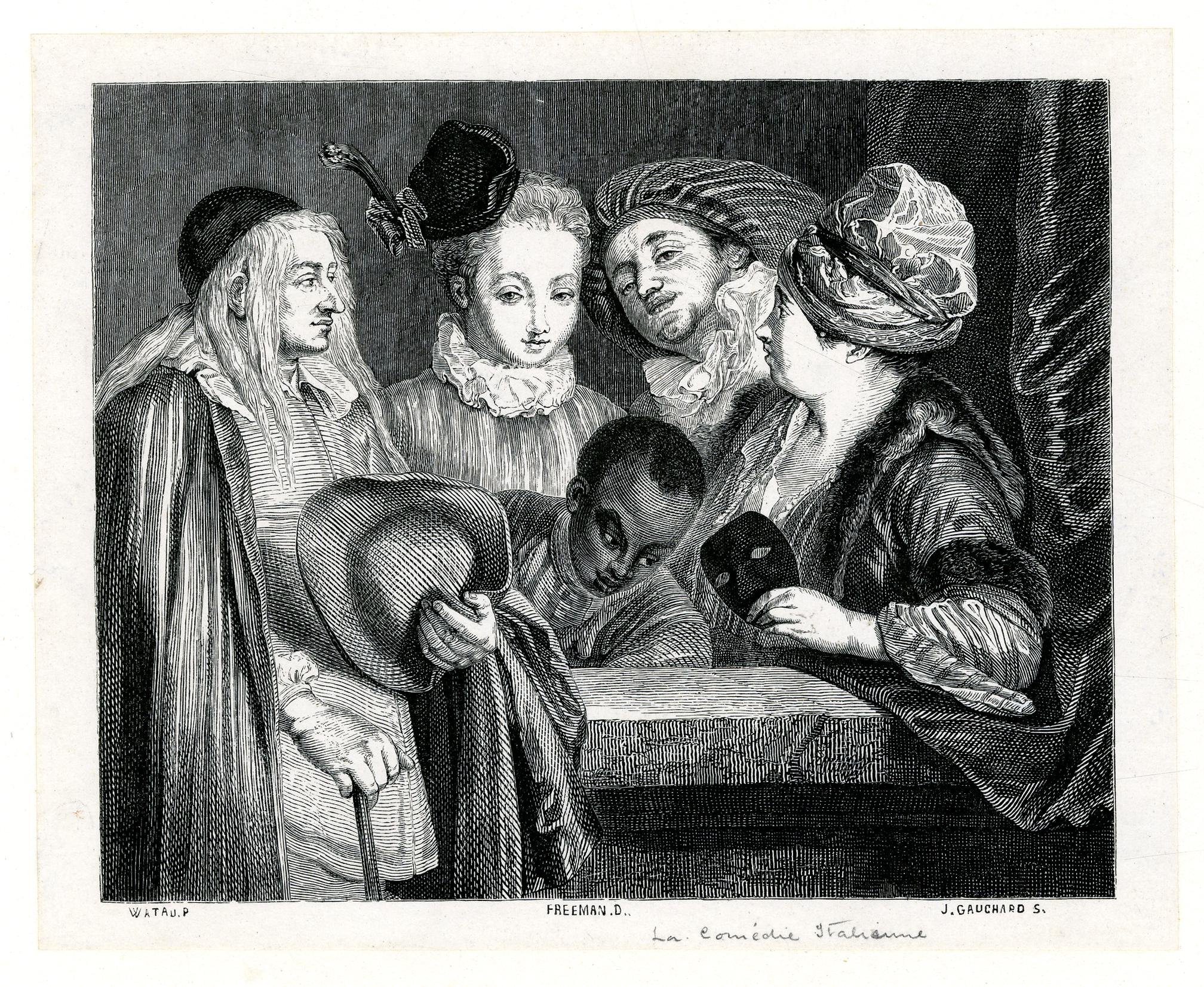
Félix Jean Gauchard after Watteau, La Comédie Italienne, ca. 1862–1863, woodcut, British Museum, London

== Exhibition history ==
List of major exhibitions featuring the work
Year	Title	Location	Cat. no.	References
1908	Les anciennes écoles de peinture dans les palais et collections privées russes, by the Starye gody magazine	Imperial Society for the Encouragement of the Arts, Saint Petersburg	286	
1922–1925	Temporary exhibition of new acquisition from French painting of the 17th and 18th centuries	Hermitage Museum, Petrograd (later Leningrad)	*	
1955	An Exhibition of French Art of the 15th-20th Centuries	Pushkin Museum, Moscow	*	
1956	An Exhibition of French Art of the 12th-20th Centuries	Hermitage Museum, Leningrad	*	
1965	Chefs-d'oeuvre de la peinture française dans les musees de l'Ermitage et de Moscou	Musée des Beaux-Arts de Bordeaux, Bordeaux	43	
1965–1966	Chefs-d'oeuvre de la peinture française dans les musees de l'Ermitage et de Moscou	Louvre, Paris	41	
1972	Watteau and His Time	Hermitage Museum, Leningrad	5	
1980	Les arts du théâtre de Watteau à Fragonard	Galerie des Beaux-Arts, Musée des Beaux-Arts de Bordeaux, Bordeaux	67	
1984	Антуан Ватто. 300 лет со дня рождения	Hermitage Museum, Leningrad	*	
1984–1985	Watteau 1684–1721	National Gallery of Art, Washington, D.C.; Galeries nationales du Grand Palais, Paris; Charlottenburg Palace, Berlin	P. 29	
General references: Grasselli, Rosenberg & Parmantier 1984, p. 313, Nemilova 1985b, p. 445, Eidelberg 2019. "*" denotes an unnumbered entry.
