= The Embarkation for Cythera =

Painting by Antoine Watteau

The Embarkation for Cythera (Louvre version): Many commentators note that it depicts a departure from the island of Cythera, the birthplace of Venus, thus symbolizing the temporary nature of human happiness.

The Embarkation for Cythera ("L'embarquement pour Cythère") is a painting by the French painter Jean-Antoine Watteau.

It is also known as Voyage to Cythera and Pilgrimage to the Isle of Cythera. Watteau submitted this work to the Royal Academy of Painting and Sculpture as his reception piece in 1717. The painting is now in the Louvre, Paris. A second version of the work, sometimes called Pilgrimage to Cythera to distinguish it, was painted by Watteau about 1718 or 1719 and is in the Charlottenburg Palace, Berlin. These elaborated a much simpler depiction painted by Watteau in 1709 or 1710, which is now in Frankfurt.

The painting was featured in the 1980 BBC Two series 100 Great Paintings.

== Subject ==
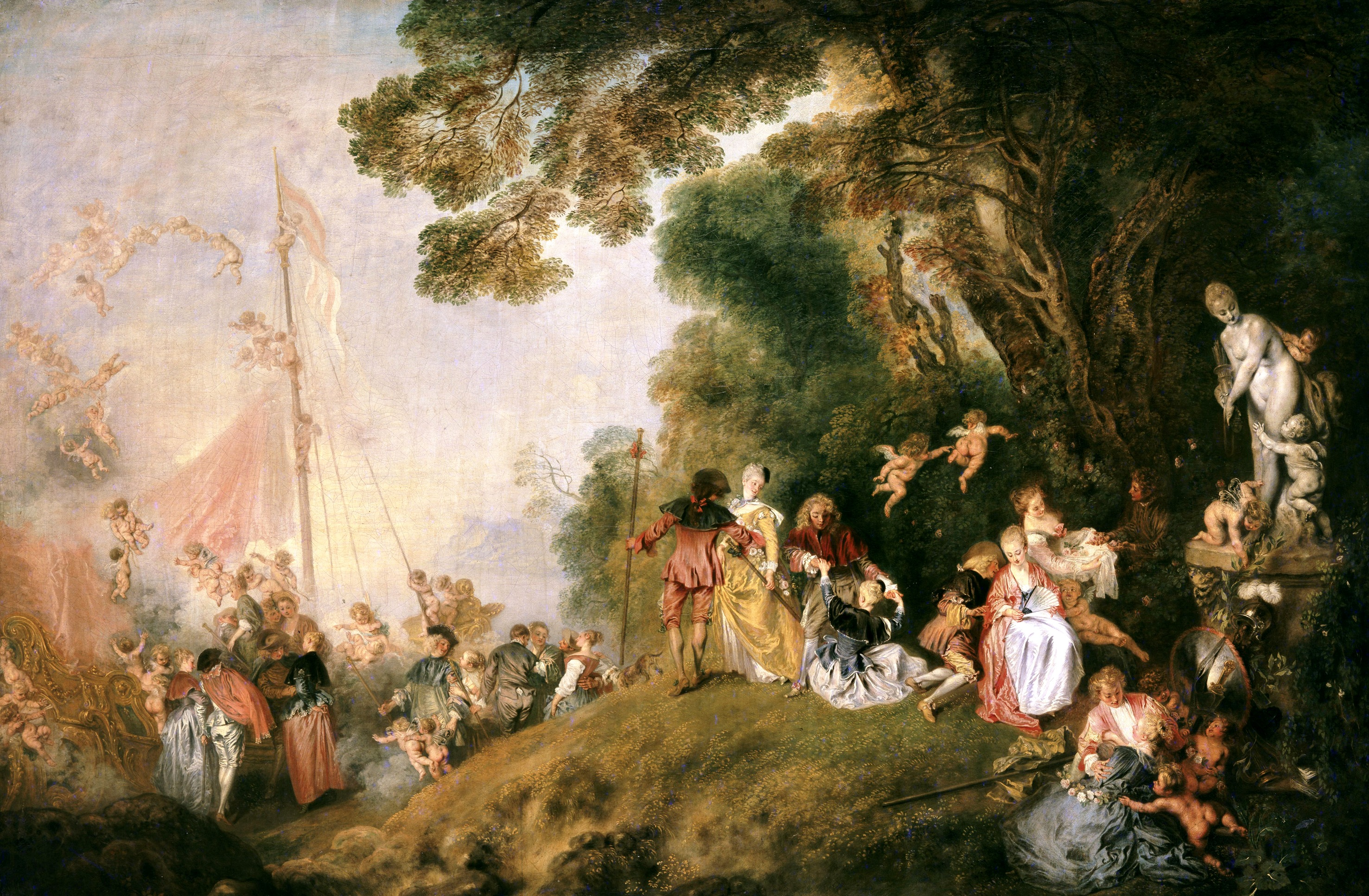
Pilgrimage to Cythera is an embellished repetition of Watteau's earlier painting, and demonstrates the frivolity and sensuousness of Rococo painting. (c. 1718–19, Berlin)

The painting portrays a "fête galante"; an amorous celebration or party enjoyed by the aristocracy of France after the death of Louis XIV, which is generally seen as a period of dissipation and pleasure, and peace, after the sombre last years of the previous reign.

The work celebrates love, with many cupids flying around the couples and pushing them closer together, as well as the statue of Venus (the goddess of love). There are three pairs of lovers in the foreground. While the couple on the right by the statue are still engaged in their passionate tryst, another couple rises to follow a third pair down the hill, although the woman of the third pair glances back fondly at the goddess's sacred grove. At the foot of the hill, several more happy couples are preparing to board the golden boat at the left. With its light and wispy brushstrokes, the hazy landscape in the background does not give to any clues about the season, or whether it is dawn or dusk.

It has often been noted that, despite the title, the people on the island seem to be leaving rather than arriving, especially since they have already paired up. Many art historians have come up with a variety of interpretations of the allegory of the voyage to the island of love. Watteau himself purposely did not give an answer.

In the ancient world, Cythera, one of the Greek islands, was thought to be the birthplace of Venus, goddess of love. Thus, the island became sacred to the goddess and love. However, the subject of Cythera may have been inspired by certain 17th century operas or an illustration of a minor play. In Florent Carton (Dancourt)'s Les Trois Cousines (The Three Cousins), a girl dressed as a pilgrim steps out from the chorus line and invites the audience to join her on a voyage to the island, where everyone will meet their ideal partner. Watteau's Actors of the Comédie-Française (c. 1711 or later) is now thought to contain portraits of a cast for this play.

== History ==
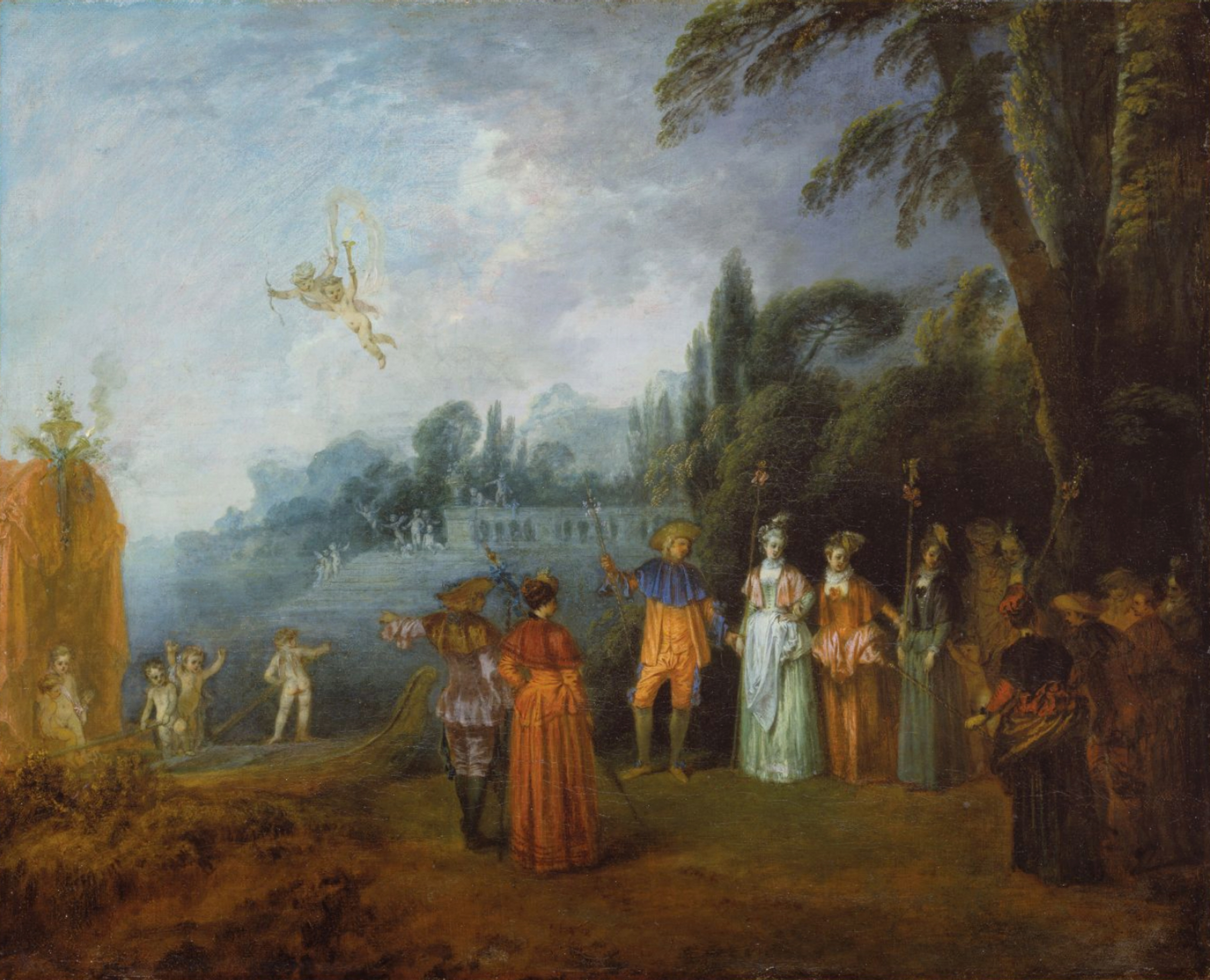
The early version in Frankfurt, 1709-10

It was around 1710 that Watteau painted his first, more literal version of the subject, which nonetheless bears a compositional similarity to the Louvre painting. This work is now in the Städtische Galerie im Städelschen Kunstinstitut, Frankfurt-am-Main.

When Watteau was accepted as a member of the academy in 1714, he was expected to present the customary reception piece. Although he was given unusual freedom in choosing a subject for his painting, his failure to submit a work brought several reprimands. Meanwhile, Watteau worked on numerous private commissions that his rising reputation brought him. Finally, in January 1717, the academy called Watteau to task, and in August of that year he presented his painting, which had been painted quickly in the preceding eight months.

The painting caused the academy to invent a new classification for it, since the subject was so striking and new. This resulted in the fête galantes (elegant fêtes or outdoor entertainments), a genre subsequently practiced by imitators of Watteau, such as Jean-Baptiste Pater and Nicolas Lancret. While the creation of the new category acknowledged Watteau as the originator of the genre, it also prevented him being recognised as history painter, the highest class of painter, and the only one from which the academy's professors were drawn. Charles-Antoine Coypel, the son of its then director, later said: "The charming paintings of this gracious painter would be a bad guide for whoever wished to paint the Acts of the Apostles."

== Popularity ==
External videos
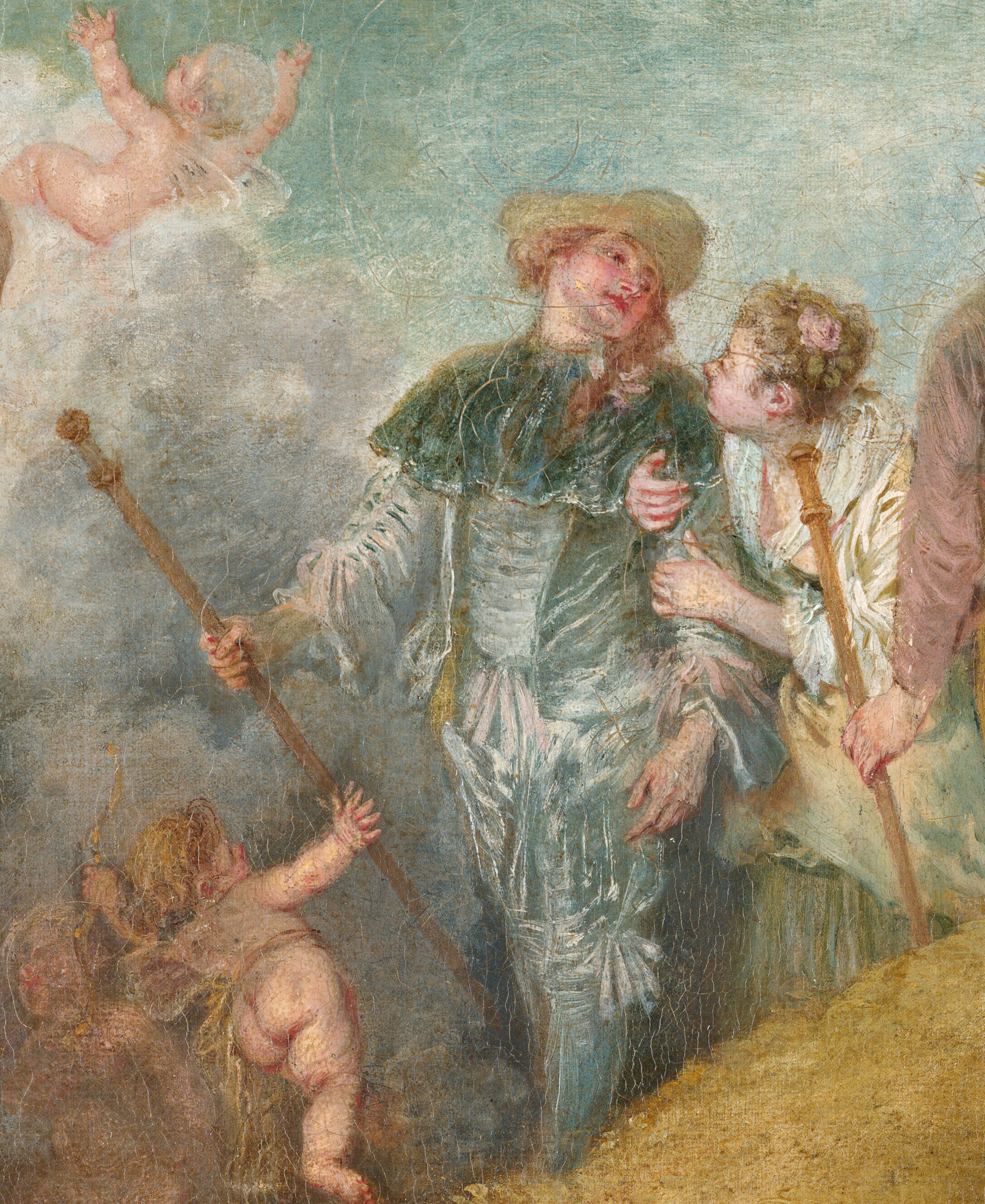
- Antoine Watteau, Pilgrimage to Cythera, 1717, Smarthistory

In the years after Watteau's death, his art fell out of fashion. During the French Revolution, some eighty years after the work was painted, his depictions of lavishly set pastoral escapades were associated with the old days of the monarchy and a frivolous aristocracy. This particular piece, which had entered the collection of the Louvre in 1795, was used by art students for target practice; an account by Pierre-Nolasque Bergeret (1782–1863) describes the drawing students throwing bread pellets at it. In the early 19th century the curator at the Louvre was forced to place it in storage until 1816 in order to protect the painting from angry protesters. It was not until the 1830s that Watteau and the Rococo returned into fashion.

== Derivative works ==
In 1904 Claude Debussy wrote a piece for solo piano titled "L'isle joyeuse", which may have been inspired by the painting; the colorful and brilliant piano writing depicts the ecstasy of the lovers. Four decades later, Debussy's compatriot Francis Poulenc wrote a lively piece for two pianos which took the name of the painting for its title, "L'Embarquement pour Cythere".

== On screen ==
''Les secrets de la fête galante. Le pèlerinage à l'île de Cythère, film by Alain Jaubert from Palettes series (1995).
