= Louisa Margaretta West =

English dancer (1754–1832)

- Born: 1754
- Died: 1832 (aged 77–78)
- Occupation: Dancer
- Years active: 1768–1781
- Spouse: Richard Suett (m. 1781)

Louisa Margaretta West (1754–1832) was an English dancer.

Louisa was the daughter of two theatrical performers, Mr and Mrs D. West. She and her siblings William, James and Miss D. all entered the theatrical profession.

Louisa trained under Giuseppe Grimaldi (father of Joseph Grimaldi) and made her debut at Drury Lane Theatre in 1768–9 at the age of 14. She performed as an entr’acte dancer and Columbine at London theatres including Haymarket, Sadler's Wells and Covent Garden, and in other cities across England, Scotland and Ireland. She often performed with her brother William. They performed before the royal family at Kew Palace in 1780.

On 8 September 1781, Louisa married actor Richard Suett and retired.
