= Caterina Biancolelli =

Italian actress (1665–1716)

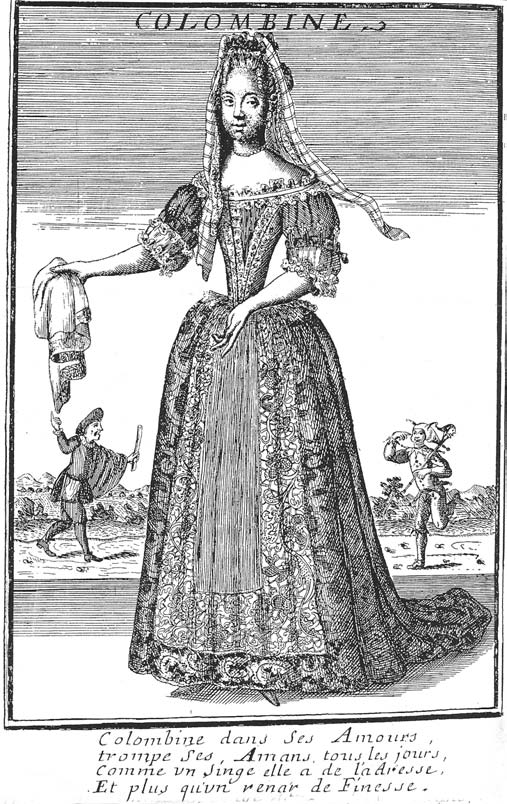
- Biancolelli as the character Colombina
- Born: 1665
- Died: 1716
- Occupation: Actress
- Years active: 1683–1697
- Known for: Portrayal of commedia dell'arte character Colombina

Caterina Biancolelli (1665–1716) was an Italian actress in the commedia dell'arte style of theater. She was one of the earliest actresses to play the role of Colombina, and one of the most famous.

Biancolelli was the daughter of actors Domenico Biancolelli (1636–1688), famous for playing Harlequin, and Orsola Cortesi (1637–1718), who played an innamorata named Eularia. Her grandmother was the actress Isabella Franchini Biancolelli, who had also played Colombina. Biancolelli and her family were members of the Comédie-Italienne troupe Ancienne Troupe de la Comedia Italienne, which performed in France.

Biancolelli began playing Colombina in her family's troupe in 1683. In that same year, she and the rest of the troupe received positive reviews from Donneau de Visé in the journal Mercure galant. In 1695, she played Arlecchina, a female version of Harlequin, in Le Retour de la foire de Bezons by Evaristo Gherardi. Along with acting, she was known for her singing, dancing, and musical talents. Her acting career ended when Italian theater in Paris was closed in 1697 and she refused to join the French theater.

== See also ==
- Commedia dell'arte
- Colombina
