= L'isle joyeuse =

Piano composition by Claude Debussy

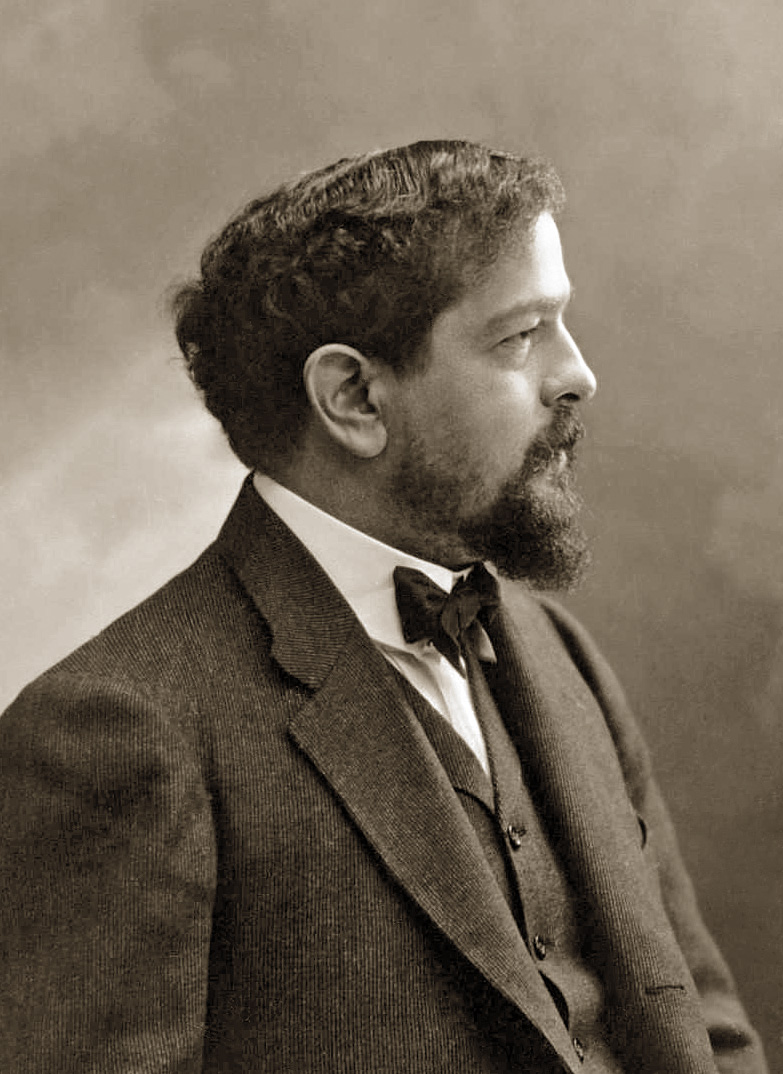
Debussy in 1905

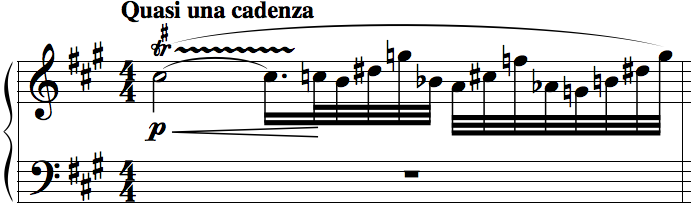
L'isle Joyeuse begins with a chromatically descending whole tone cadenza.

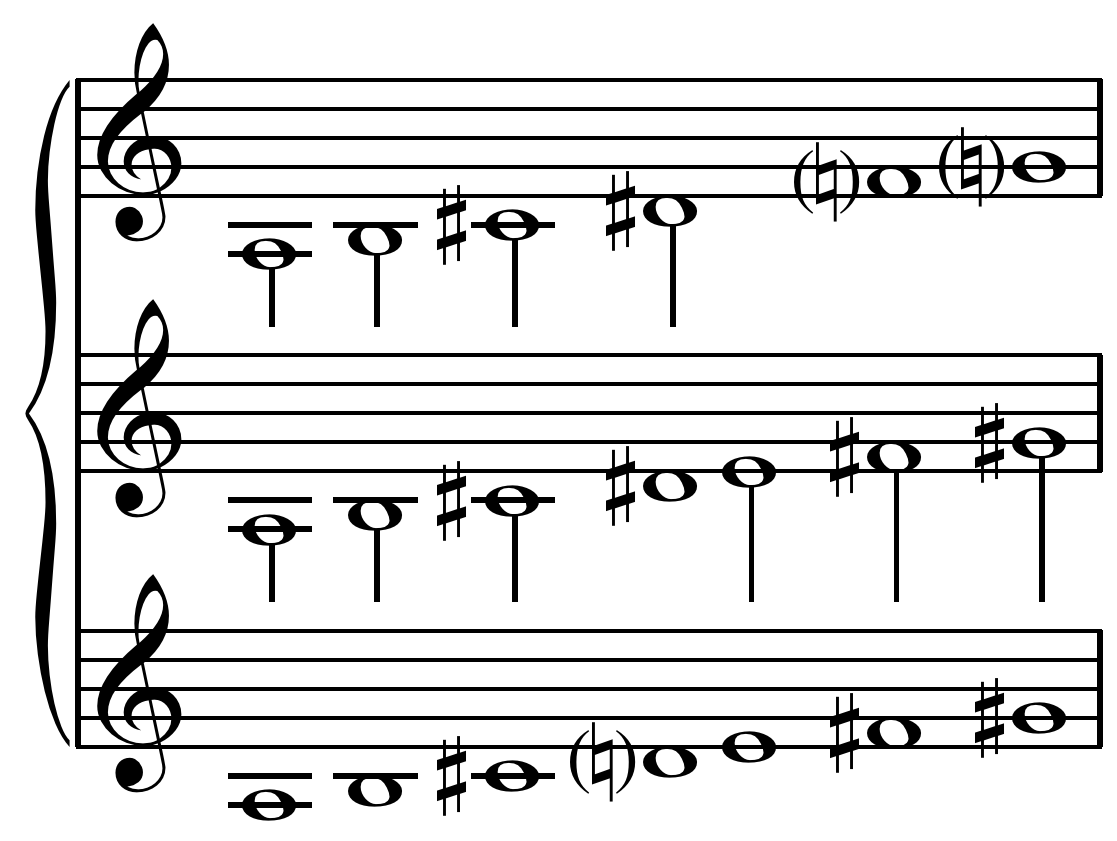
Whole tone, lydian, and major scales on A.

L'isle joyeuse, L. 106 (The Joyful Island) is a piece for solo piano by Claude Debussy composed in 1904. It is assumed that the painting The Embarkation for Cythera by Jean-Antoine Watteau served as inspiration for the piece, with Debussy reimagining a group's journey to Cythera, the island considered Aphrodite's birthplace, and their subsequent ecstatic unions of love upon arrival. According to Jim Samson (1977), the "central relationship in the work is that between material based on the whole-tone scale, the Lydian mode and the diatonic scale, the Lydian mode functioning as an effective mediator between the other two."

== Structure ==
=== Exposition, bars 1–98 ===
The introduction creates a whole tone context. This changes to an A Lydian context which, in bars 15–21, transitions, through the addition of G natural, to the whole tone context of a new motive at bar 21. This A Lydian context serves to transition from the whole tone mode on A to the A major context, inflected by occasional Lydian D♯s, of the second theme at bar 67.

=== Middle, bars 99–159 ===
The other transposition of the whole tone scale, avoided in the outer sections, is used and provides further harmonic contrast.

=== Recapitulation, bars 160–255 ===
The second subject appears in pure A major, the "ultimate tonal goal of the piece". The opening codas "louder and more animatedly until the very end". It ends with a loud tremolo, a group of grace notes ascending to two octaves of A notes in the highest registers of the piano, and a quick, final arpeggio, the same arpeggio used to accompany the first use of the second subject, played downwards, hitting the lowest note on the keyboard (A_{0}) markedly.

L´isle joyeuse
Performance in 2016 by Eunmi Ko on piano, live at Museum of Romanticism (Madrid) (6:13)
