= Reception piece =

Diploma artwork submitted to an academy

The Embarkation for Cythera, 1717, was Jean-Antoine Watteau's reception piece for the Académie Royale de Peinture et de Sculpture.

In art, a reception piece is a work submitted by an artist to an academy for approval as part of the requirements for admission to membership.

The piece is normally representative of the artist's work, and the organization's judgement of its skill may or may not form part of the criteria for accepting a new entrant. The work itself is usually retained by the academy, and many academies have large and valuable collections acquired in this way. Alternative terms include diploma work at the Royal Academy in London (where some 18th and 19th century examples are on display), diploma piece, and in France at the Académie royale de peinture et de sculpture, tableau de réception or morceau de réception. The term masterpiece originated in the same way under the earlier system of guilds, including those for artists.

== Origins ==
The requirement to submit a reception or diploma piece is closely related to the practice in the medieval period and later of requiring a craftsman to submit one or more virtuoso or test-pieces to a guild to demonstrate his skill before he was granted membership.

== Joining an academy ==
Membership of an academy may be by genre or technique and limited by numbers or age. The Royal Academy, London, for instance, at one time limited the number of engravers who could join, and where artistic styles and tastes change, new categories of membership may be created as necessary.

When Antoine Watteau applied to join the Académie Royale de Peinture et de Sculpture, there was no suitable category for his fête galante works, so the academy simply created one rather than reject his application, describing him as a "peintre des festes galantes". While this acknowledged Watteau as the originator of the genre, it also prevented him being recognised as a history painter, the highest class of painter, and the only one from which the academy's professors were drawn. Charles-Antoine Coypel, the son of its then director, later said: "The charming paintings of this gracious painter would be a bad guide for whoever wished to paint the Acts of the Apostles."

In 1728, when Jean-Baptiste-Siméon Chardin was admitted to the same academy for The Ray, it was as a "painter of animals and fruits".

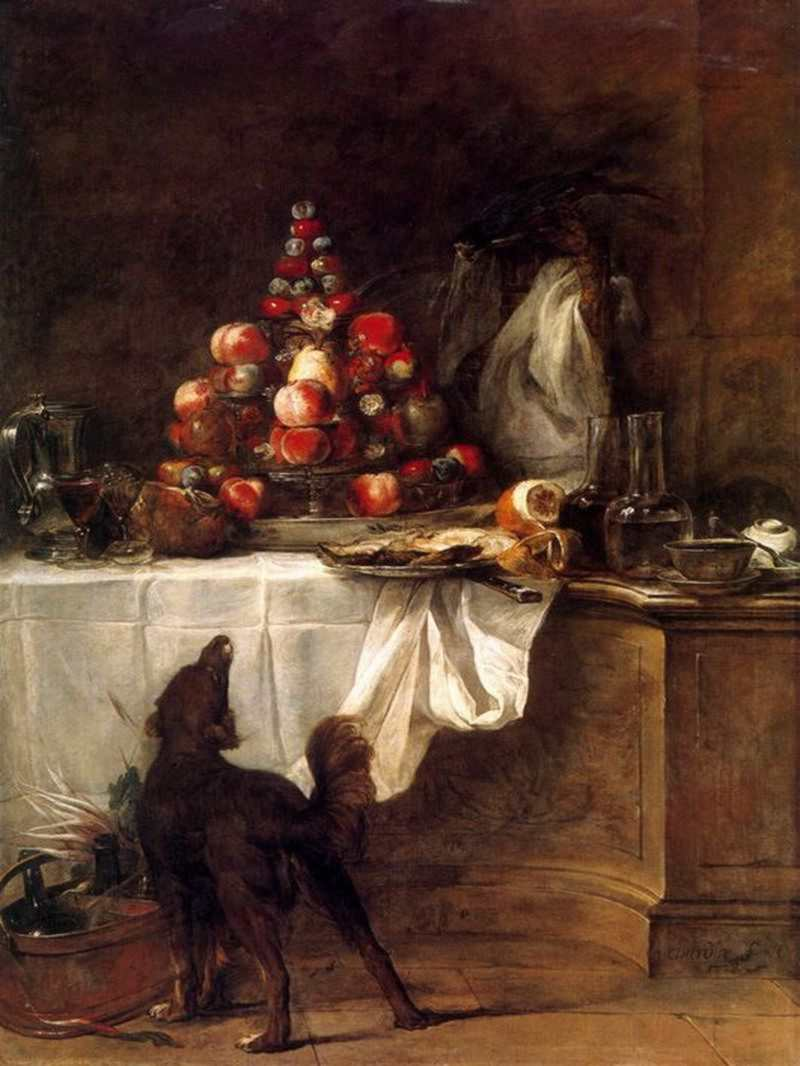
Le Buffet, Jean-Baptiste-Siméon Chardin

== Gallery ==
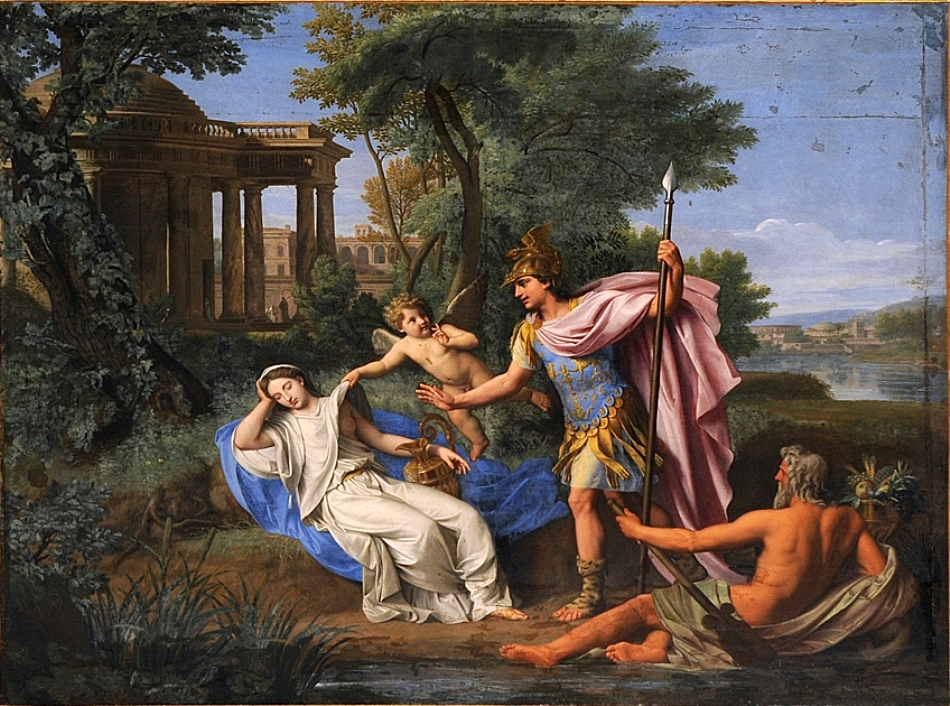
Mars and Rhea Silvia by Nicolas Colombel, 1694, for the Académie Royale de Peinture et de Sculpture.

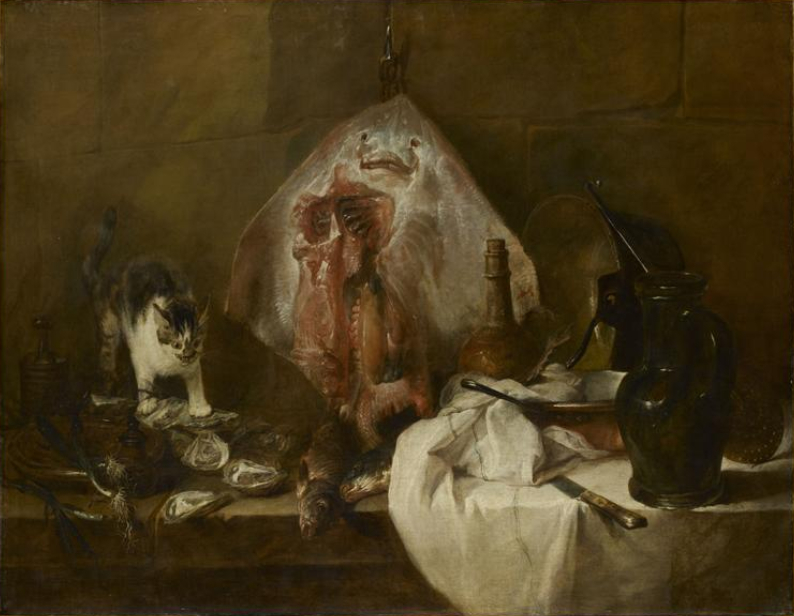
Chardin's The Ray for the Académie Royale de Peinture et de Sculpture, 1728.

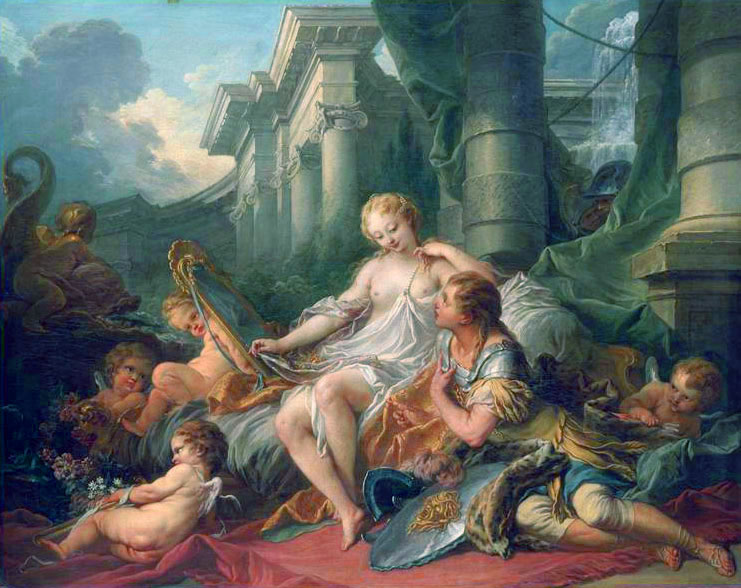
Rinaldo and Armida by François Boucher for the Académie Royale de Peinture et de Sculpture, 1734.

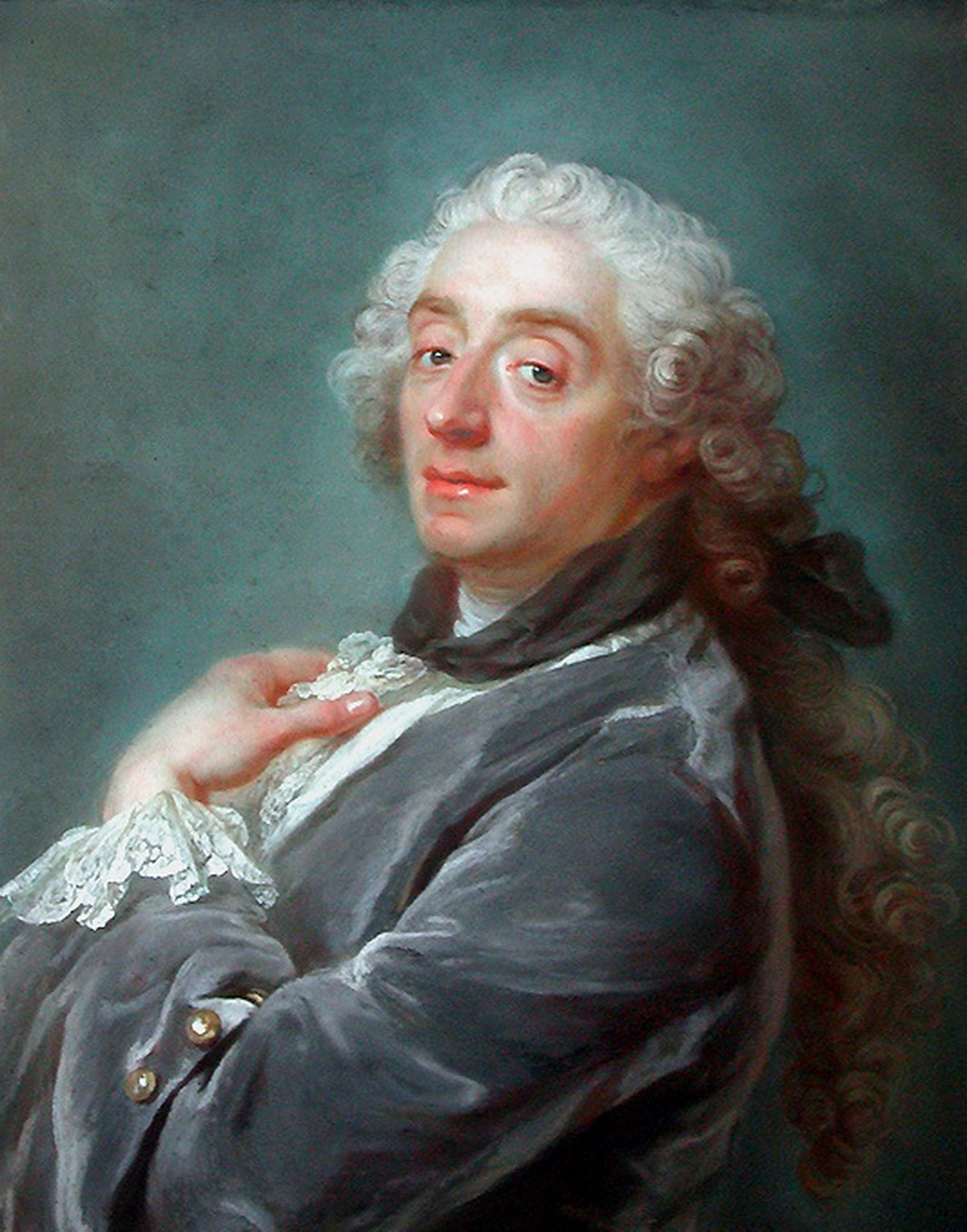
François Boucher by Gustav Lundberg, 1741. One of two works by Lundberg presented to the Académie Royale de Peinture et de Sculpture 1742.

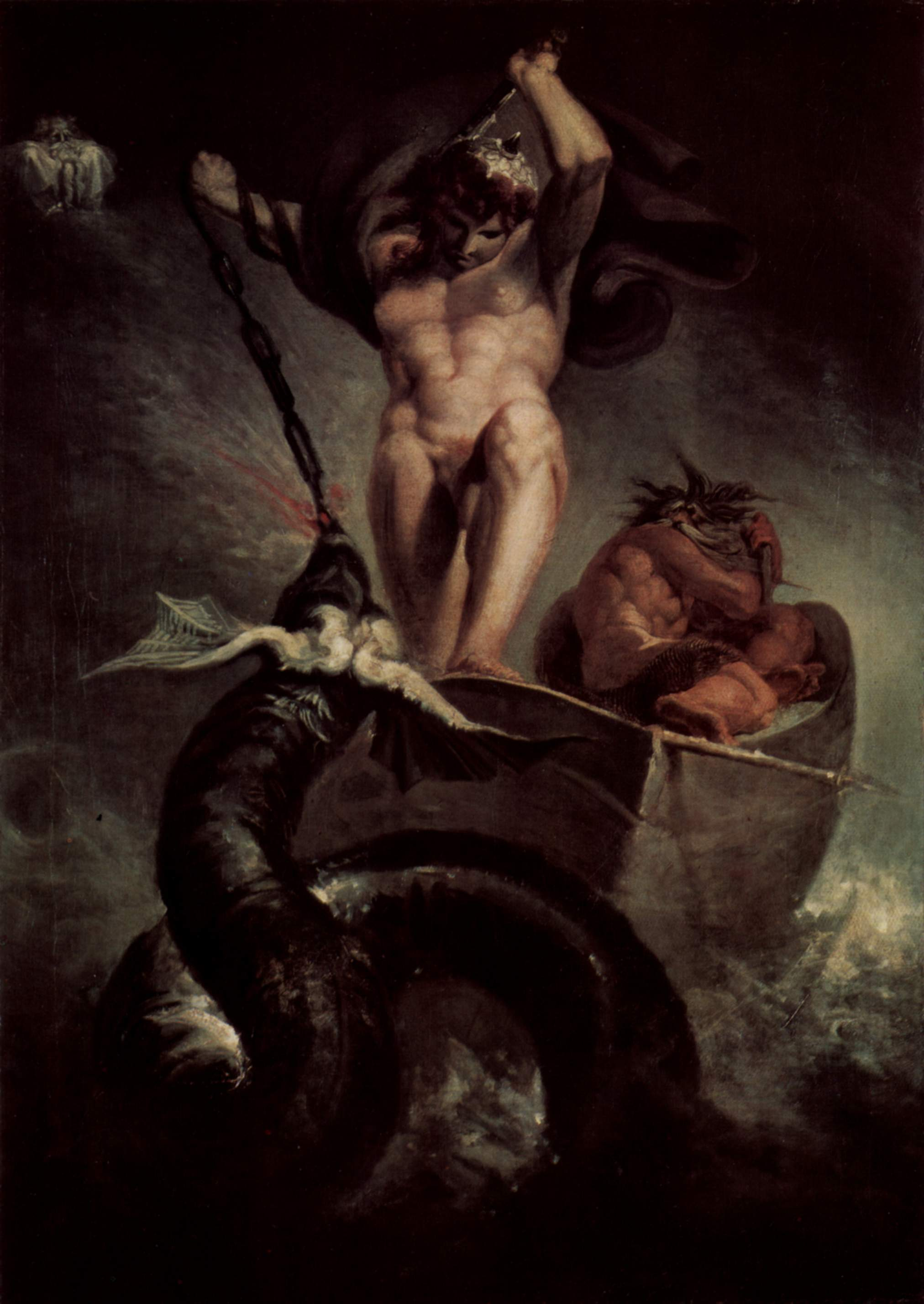
Henry Fuseli's Thor battering the Midgard Serpent, was his Diploma Work for the Royal Academy, accepted 1790.

== See also ==
- Masterpiece
