= Marriage Contract and Country Dancing =

c. 1711 painting by Antoine Watteau

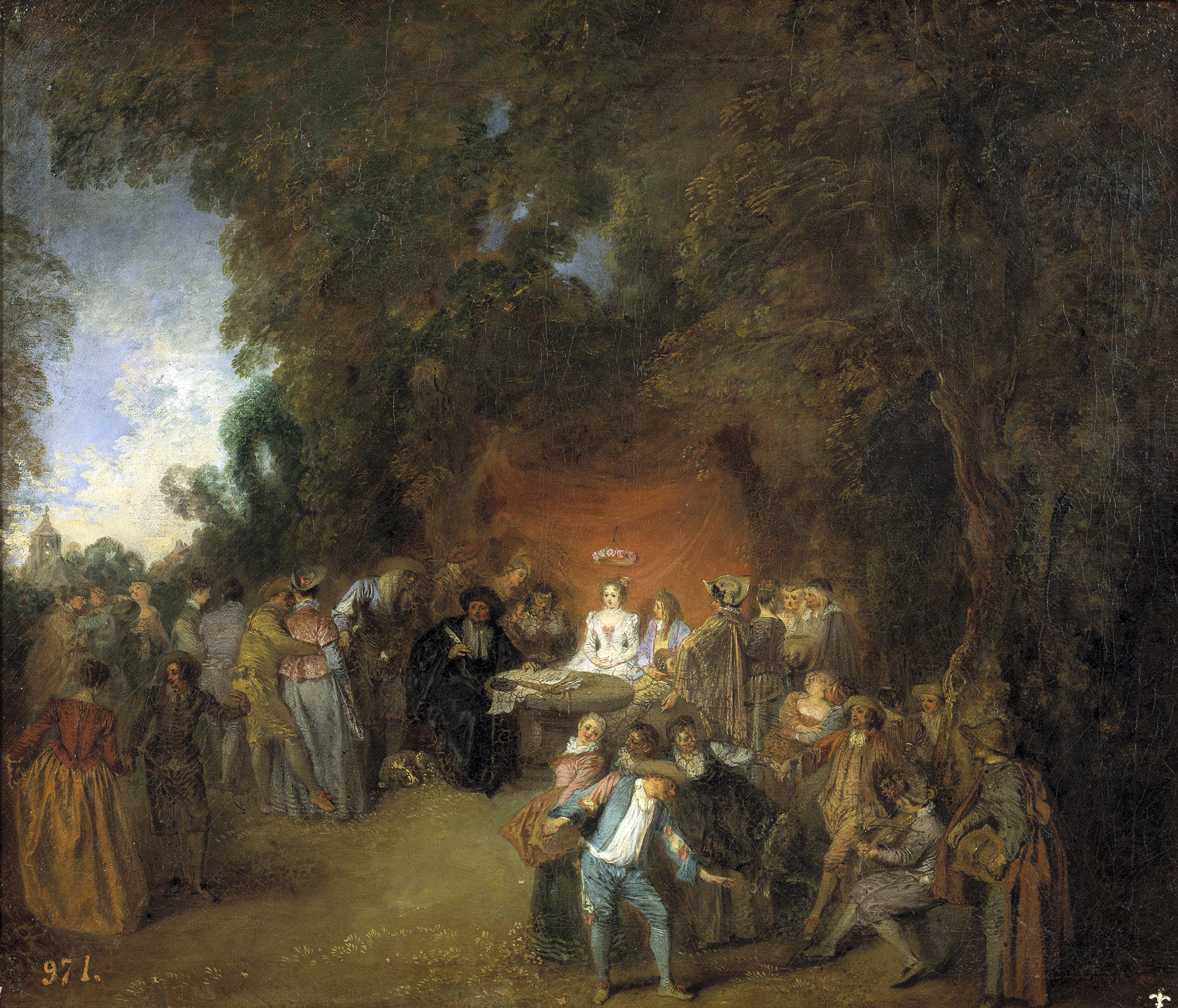
- Artist: Antoine Watteau
- Year: c. 1711
- Medium: oil on canvas
- Dimensions: 47 cm × 55 cm (19 in × 22 in)
- Location: Museo del Prado, Madrid

Marriage Contract and Country Dancing is a c. 1711 oil-on-canvas painting by French artist Antoine Watteau. It entered the Spanish royal collection as part of the collection of Isabella Farnese and was recorded in the La Granja de San Ildefonso Palace in Segovia. It is now in the Prado Museum, in Madrid. It shows the signing of a marriage contract in a rural landscape.
