= Antoine de La Roque =

French journalist and librettist (1672–1744)

Antoine Watteau, Antoine de la Roque, c. 1718, Tokyo Fuji Art Museum

Antoine de La Roque (1672, Marseille, Provence – 3 October 1744, Paris) was an 18th-century French librettist.

== Biography ==
When La Roque was constable of the Royal Guard, a cannonball smashed his leg during the battle of Malplaquet, and they had to cut it off above the knee. He left the service with the Cross of Chevalier of the Order of Saint Louis and a pension from Louis XIV.

In 1721, he took over the privilege of the Mercure de France, to which his brother Jean de Laroque also participated and perfected it, writing in collaboration with Fuzelier and Dufresny, from June 1721 up to 31 October 1744. When Dufresny died in October 1724, La Roque was left alone to administer the review and d’Antoine also participated.

He also wrote an opera, Théoné, five-act tragédie lyrique, Paris, Ribou, (1715). Abbott Pellegrin under the name La Roque gave the theater his tragedy Medée et Jason, which was even printed several times under his own name from 1716 until 1760.

Antoine La Roque was also known for being a great collector, particularly of paintings. In 1745, Gersaint, the famous art dealer of the Pont Notre-Dame, wrote a catalog of chevalier La Roque's cabinet. Among the 300 paintings from his collection were the Flight into Egypt by Paul Veronese, a St. George by Rubens, drinkers and auctioneers by Terburg, a lady by Gérard Nesscher, Bathsheba leaving her bath by Nicolas Poussin, two landscapes by Claude Lorrain, three paintings by Wouwerman, two paintings by Antoine Watteau etc. All these paintings would be sold at a modest price, probably given the disasters of France.

== Sources ==
- Grasselli, Margaret Morgan; Rosenberg, Pierre; Parmantier, Nicole; et al. (1984). Watteau, 1684–1721 (PDF) (exhibition catalogue). Washington: National Gallery of Art. ISBN 0-89468-074-9. OCLC 557740787 – via the National Gallery of Art archive.
- Guicharnaud, Hélène (1996). "La Roque, Chevalier Antoine de". In Turner, Jane (ed.). The Dictionary of Art. Vol. 18. New York: Grove's Dictionaries. p. 796. ISBN 1-884446-00-0. OCLC 1033666240 – via the Internet Archive.
- Rival, Pierre (2006). Pour l'honneur d'une belle : les chroniques indiscrètes d'Antoine de Laroque, chevalier journaliste (in French). Paris: Flammarion. ISBN 2-08-068860-X. LCCN 2006501806 – via the Internet Archive.
- Antoine de Léris, Dictionnaire portatif historique et littéraire des théâtres (Leris), Paris, C. A. Jombert, p. 611-2.
- Joseph-Marie Quérard, La France littéraire, t. 4, Paris, Firmin Didot, 1830, p. 570.
