= Evaristo Gherardi =

Italian actor and playwright

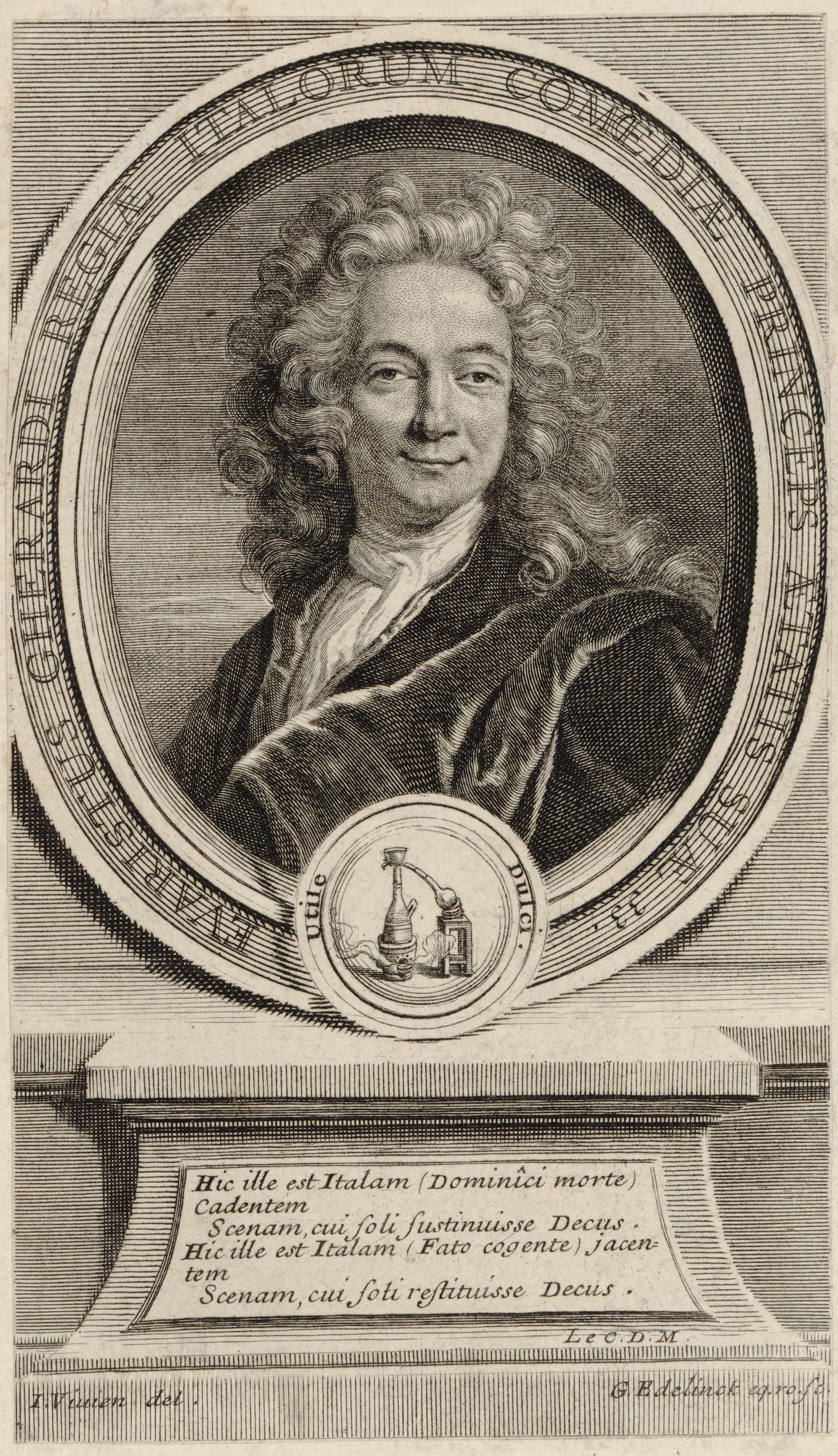
Engraving of Évariste Gherardi by Gérard Edelinck

Evaristo Gherardi (born 11 Novembre 1663 in Prato, Tuscany; assassinated 31 August 1700 in Paris), known in France as Évariste Gherardi, was an Italian actor and playwright, who arrived in France at the beginning of the 1670s.

The son of two actors of the Italian troupe, Leonarda Galli and Giovanni Gherardi dit Flautin (Spoleto, ?? - Paris, 23 March 1683), he made his debut at the Théâtre italien de Paris 1 October 1689 in the role of Arlequin.

He wrote Le Retour de la foire de Bezons for this theatre and collected numerous anonymous plays in six volumes titled Théâtre italien, ou Recueil de toutes les scènes françaises qui ont été jouées sur le théâtre italien de l'Hôtel de Bourgogne (1694–1700).

He never took French citizenship.

== Bibliography ==
- Scherer, Colette (2008). "Gherardi (recueil de)", p. 618, in Dictionnaire encyclopédique du théâtre à travers le monde, edited by Michel Corvin. Paris: Bordas. ISBN 9782047312957.
