= Columbine (stock character) =

Commedia dell'arte stock character

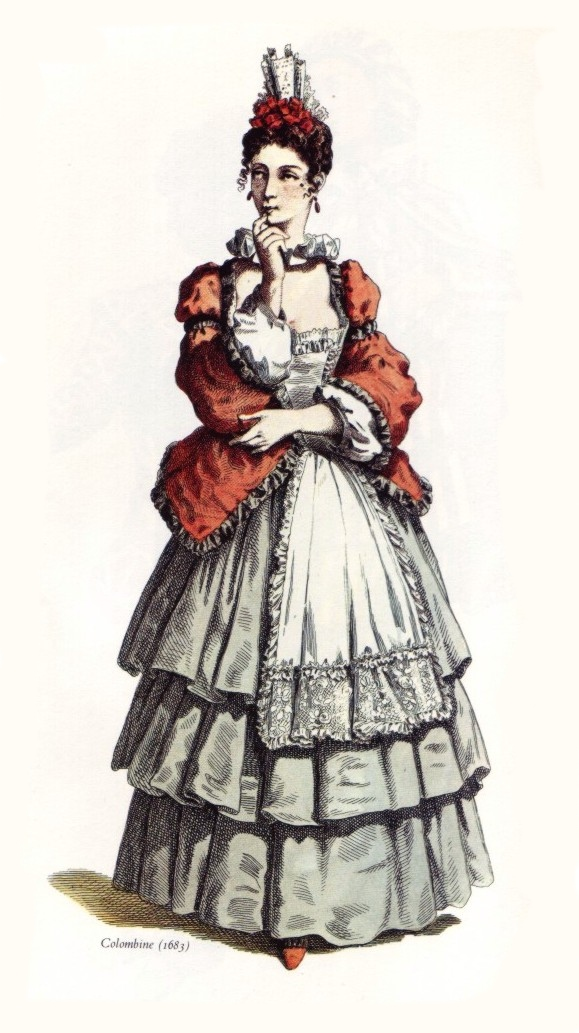
1862 depiction of a Columbine set in 1683

Columbine (Italian: Colombina; French: Colombine; lit. 'little dove') is a stock character in the commedia dell'arte. She is Harlequin's mistress, a comic servant playing the tricky slave type, and love interest of Pierrot. Rudlin and Crick use the Italian spelling Colombina in Commedia dell'Arte: A Handbook for Troupes.

== History ==
The role of the female servant was originally that of an entr'acte dancer. Women were not allowed to be part of the story that was being played out on stage, but they were allowed to have a dance in-between the action. Eventually these women became the buxom and gossipy servants of characters that were already allowed on stage, and then, later, the counterparts to the Zanni characters. Columbine was very down to earth and could always see the situation for what it actually was. She was also sometimes portrayed as a prostitute. She was very infrequently without something to say to or about someone.

She is dressed in a very short ragged and patched dress, appropriate to a master of the arts. These characters were usually played unmasked, but with bonnets and metal chokers. She was also known to wear heavy makeup around her eyes and carry a tambourine, which she could use to fend off the amorous advances of Pantalone. Columbine was sometimes chased after by Harlequin (Arlecchino) or was close friends with him. There is record of Columbine using numerous disguises to trick or seduce Harlequin. Where most other characters are content with one disguise, Gheraldi's Columbine has several different disguises to confuse Harlequin and to keep the audience on their toes.

She was sometimes the only functional intellect on the stage, but not always. Columbine aided her mistress, the innamorata, to gain the affections of her one true love. She is sometimes the lover of Harlequin, but not always. They sometimes engage in sexual activity, but not always. She may be a flirtatious and impudent character, indeed a soubrette.

In the verismo opera Pagliacci by Ruggero Leoncavallo, the head of the troupe's wife, Nedda, playing as Columbine, cheats on her husband, Canio, playing as Pierrot, both onstage with Harlequin and offstage with Silvio.

Although Columbine is one name associated with the female servant prostitute character archetype, other names under which the same character is played in commedia dell'arte performances include Franceschina, Smeraldina, Oliva, Nespola, Spinetta Ricciolina, and Corallina Diamantina. Colombina became the most common name used to describe the sobretta character, especially as Colombine in France and Columbine in England.

One of the actresses who made this character famous was Silvia Roncagli, the first woman recorded doing a seretta role named Francheschina in about 1570. One of the first women to play the role named Colombina was Italian actress Isabella Franchini Biancolelli. Her granddaughter, Caterina Biancolelli, was one of the most famous serettas whose name was Colombina. She played the part about 1683.

There is record of the French playwright Molière having attended many performances of the Comédie-Italienne, or commedia dell'arte. He is even referenced in a performance by Angelo Costantini of his show Une Vie de Scaramouche, which refers to the writer and poet. This might suggest that the servant character in many of Molière's plays, such as Dorine in his play Tartuffe, might be based on this particular character archetype from the commedia dell'arte.

== Gallery ==
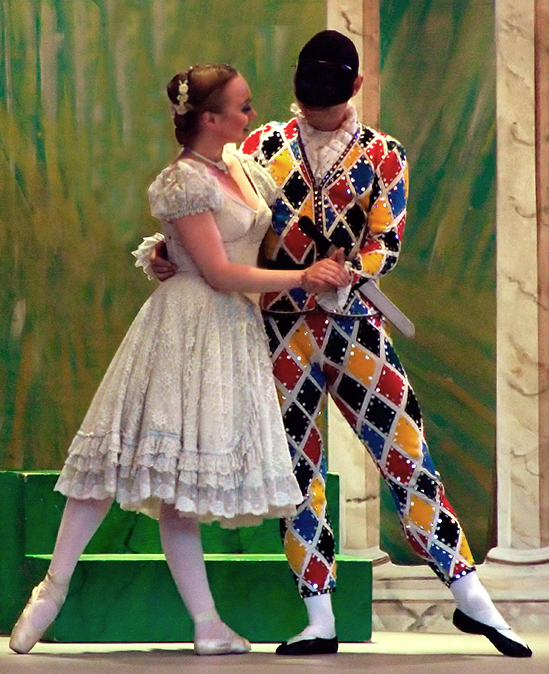
Harlequin dancing with Columbine

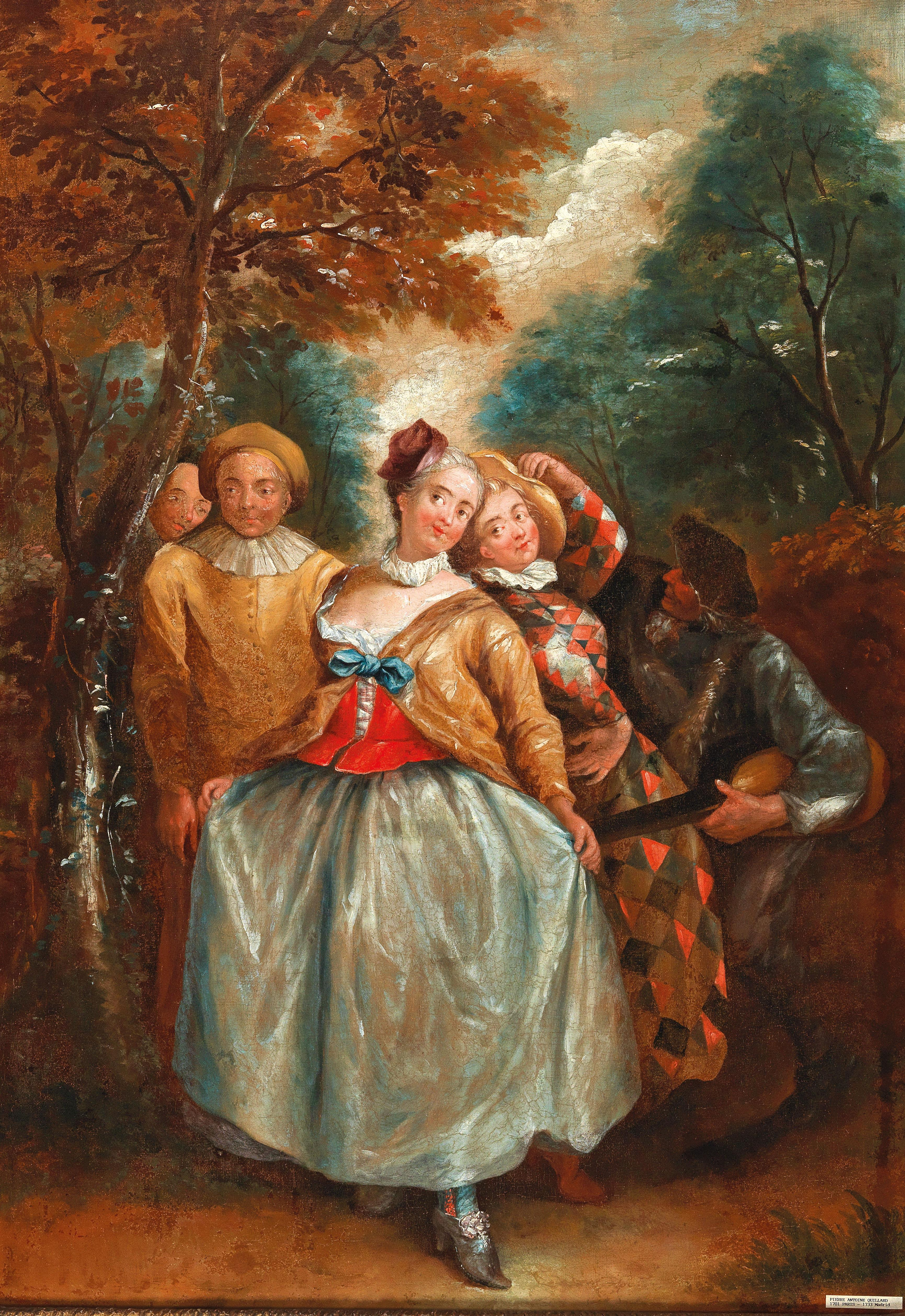
Pierrot, Columbine, and Harlequin (painting by Pierre-Antoine Quillard, c. 1733)

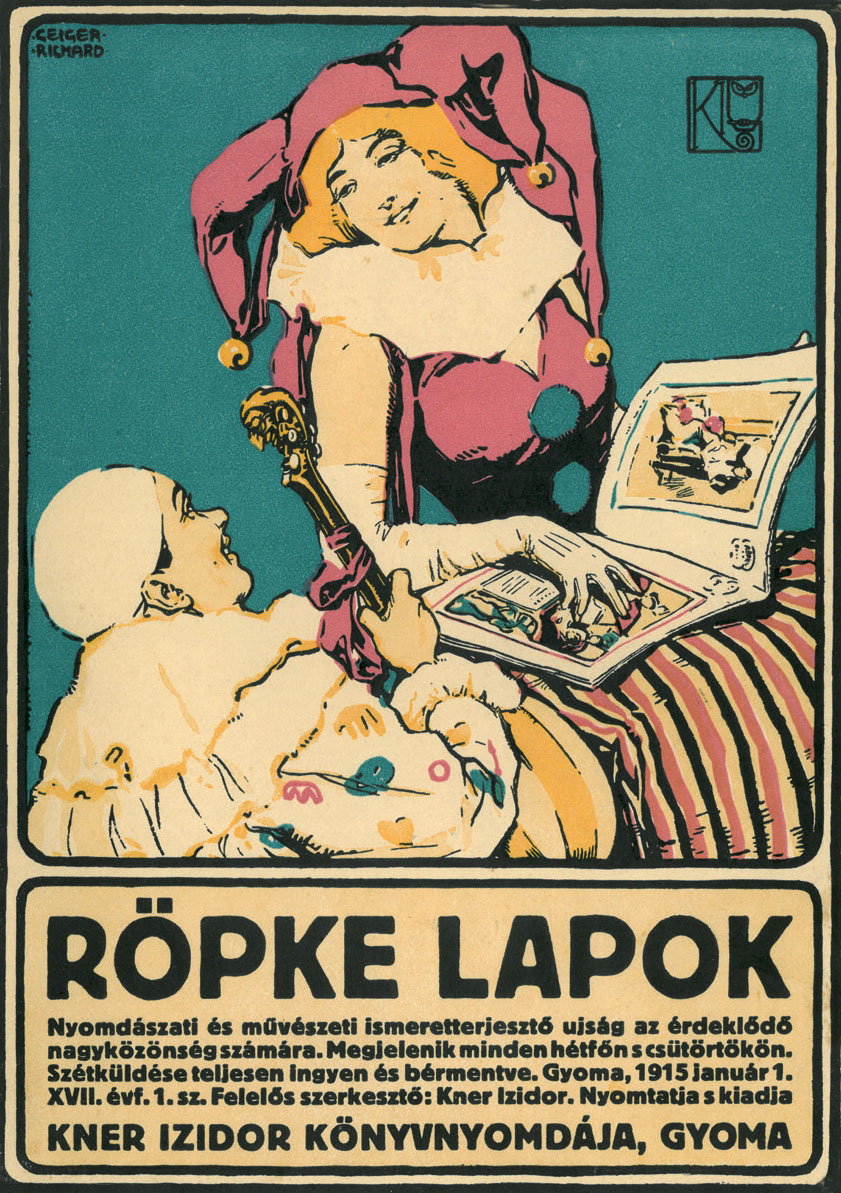
The cover of the newspaper Röpke Lapok by Richard Geiger featuring Pierrot and Columbine

== See also ==
- Commedia dell'arte
- Pierrot
- Caterina Biancolelli

== Bibliography ==
- Rudlin, John (1994). Commeida dell'Arte. New York: Routledge. p. 129. ISBN 978-0415047708.
- Grantham, Barry (2000). Playing Commedia: A Training Guide to Commedia Techniques. Portsmouth NH: Heinemann Drama. ISBN 9780325003467.
- Oreglia, Giacomo (1968). The Commedia dell'Arte. New York: Hall and Wang. ISBN 9780374961527.
- Radulescu, Domnica (March 2008). "Caterina's Colombina: The Birth of a Female Trickster in Seventeenth-Century France". Theatre Journal. 60 (1): 87–113. doi:10.1353/tj.2008.0059. ISSN 0192-2882. JSTOR 25070159. S2CID 191330309.
- Smith, Winifred (1964). The Commedia dell'Arte. Benjamin Blom, Inc. ISBN 9780405089848.
- Moland, Louis (1867). Molière et la Comédie Italienne. Paris: Dider et Cie.
