= Florent Carton (Dancourt) =

French dramatist and actor

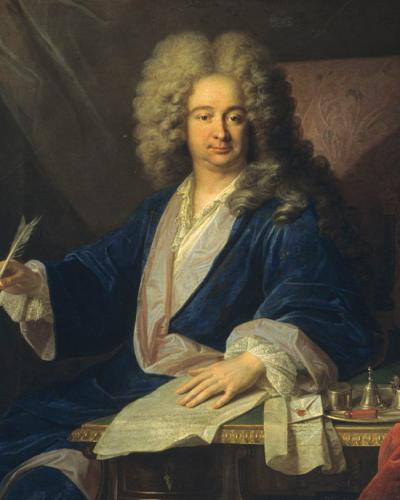
Florent Carton (Dancourt)

Florent Carton aka Dancourt (1 November 1661 – 7 December 1725), French dramatist and actor, was born at Fontainebleau. He belonged to a family of rank, and his parents entrusted his education to Pere de la Rue, a Jesuit, who made earnest efforts to induce him to join the order. But he had no religious vocation and proceeded to study law.

He practised at the bar for some time, but his marriage to the daughter of the comedian Francois Lenoir de la Thorilliere led him to become an actor, and in 1685, in spite of the strong opposition of his family, he appeared at the Theatre Francais. His gifts as a comedian gave him immediate and marked success, both with the public and with his fellow actors. He was the spokesman of his company on occasions of state, and in this capacity he frequently appeared before Louis XIV., who treated him with great favour.

One of his most famous impersonations was Alceste in Molière's The Misanthrope. His first play, Le Notaire obligeant, produced in 1685, was well received. La Désolation des joueuses (1687) was still more successful. Le Chevalier à la mode (1687) is generally regarded as his best work, though his claim to original authorship in this and some other cases has been disputed. In Le Chevalier à la mode appears the bourgeoise infatuated with the desire to be an aristocrat. The type is developed in Les Bourgeoises de la mode (1692) and Les Bourgeoises de qualité (1700). Dancourt was a prolific author, and produced some sixty plays in all, including Le Diable boiteux (1707, an adaptation of the eponymous novel from Lesage).

Some years before his death he terminated his career both as an actor and as an author by retiring to his chateau at Courcelles le Roi, in Berry, where he employed himself in making a poetical translation of the Psalms and in writing a sacred tragedy.

The plays of Dancourt are faithful descriptions of the manners of the time, and as such have real historical value. The characters are drawn with a realistic touch that led to his being styled by Charles Palissot the Teniers of comedy. He is very successful in his delineation of low life, and especially of the peasantry. The dialogue is sparkling, witty and natural. Many of the incidents of his plots were derived from actual occurrences in the fast and scandalous life of the period, and several of his characters were drawn from well-known personages of the day. Most of the plays incline to the type of farce rather than of pure comedy. Voltaire defined his talent in the words: "What Regnard was in respect to Moliere in the high comedy, Dancourt was in the farce." (French: "Ce que Regnard était à l'égard de Molière dans la haute comédie, le comédien Dancourt l'était dans la farce.")

His two daughters, Manon and Marie-Anne (Mimi), both obtained success on the stage of the Théâtre Francais.
