= Barteau =

Notable people with the surname include:

- Mark Alan Barteau, American engineer
- Vincent Barteau (born 1962), French cyclist

== See also ==
- Bertot, Bertaud, Berteau, Berteaux, Bertaux, Barto
