= Bertot =

Notable people with the surname include:

- Fabrizio Bertot, Italian politician
- John Carlo Bertot (1964-), American information scientist
- Sophie Alouf-Bertot (born 1945), Belgian graphic designer

== See also ==
- Bertot, Bertaud, Berteau, Berteaux, Bertaux, Barto
