= Cupid Disarmed (Watteau) =

Painting by Antoine Watteau

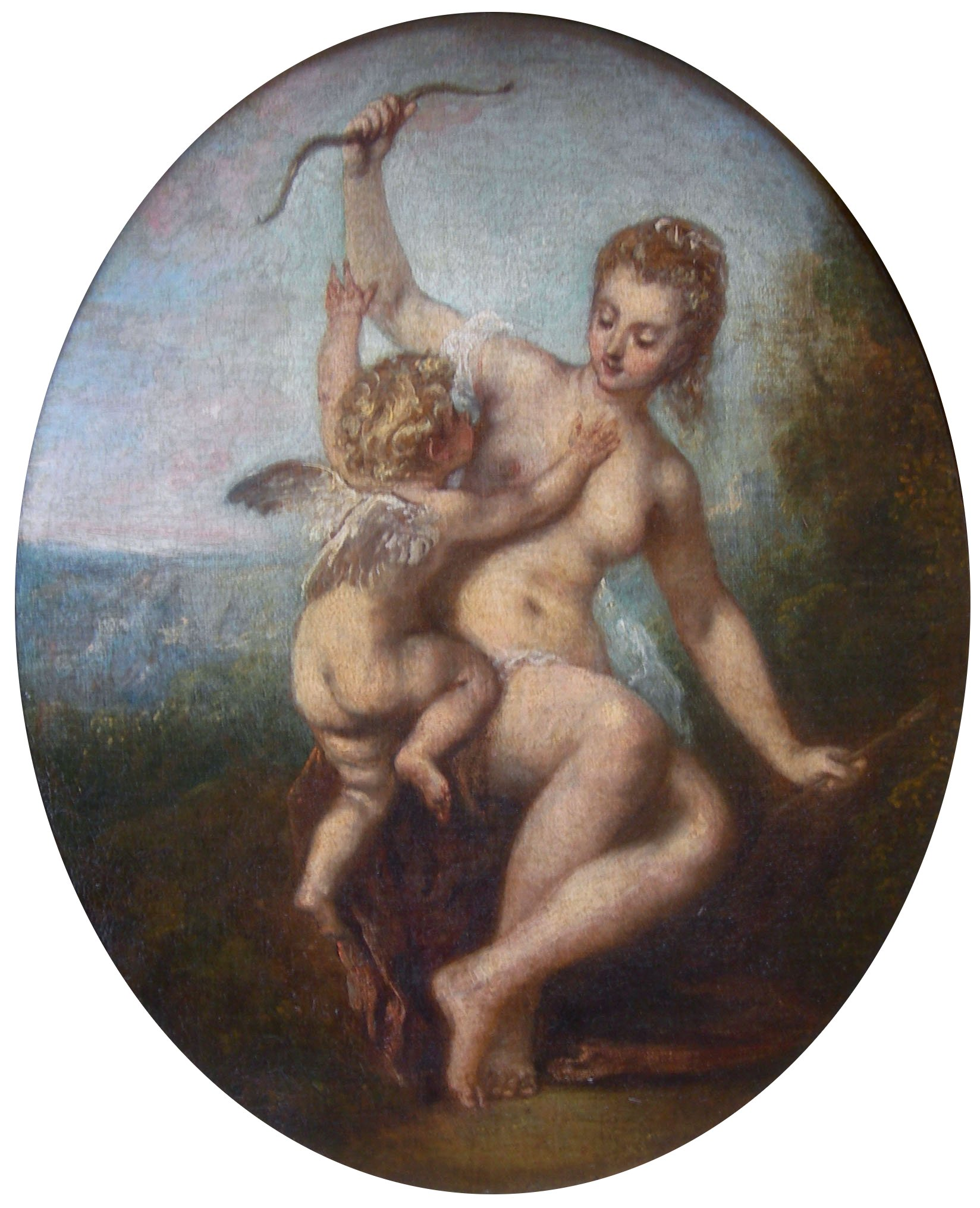
Cupid Disarmed (c. 1715) attributed to Jean-Antoine Watteau

Cupid Disarmed (L'Amour désarmé) is a c. 1715 oil-on-canvas painting, usually but not definitively attributed to Antoine Watteau. It is one of eight paintings kept by Watteau's friend and protector Jean de Jullienne until the latter's death in 1766. Benoît Audran engraved it in 1727 and described and reproduced it in an inventory of the Jullienne collection in 1756. After Jullienne's death the art dealer Boileau jajaja bought it for Jean-Baptiste de Montullé, Jullienne's executor.

It was sold again in 1783 and seems to have been sold from the hôtel Bullion to a British collector after the Reign of Terror, before returning to France just before 1848. It then entered the collection of the marquis de Maison, with which it was bought by Henri d'Orleans, Duke of Aumale in 1868, who hung it in the salle de la Tribune in his château de Chantilly. It still forms part of the Musée Condé.

== Topic ==
It is one of the rare mythological paintings painted by Watteau, representing Venus grasping Cupid's bow. One hypothesis is that it was painted at the time of the reception of the painter into the Académie royale de peinture et de sculpture. According to Pierre-Jean Mariette, Watteau was inspired by a drawing by Paolo Veronese which had belonged to Pierre Crozat then to Mariette himself and which is now kept in the Louvre museum.

By its format and its characters, the painting has also been compared to another painting by Watteau: Autumn, which is also kept at the Louvre.

There are many replicas of it. It is a relatively common theme in academic painting, taken up by François Boucher in 1751.
