= Élisabeth Haudry =

French noblewoman and salon-holder

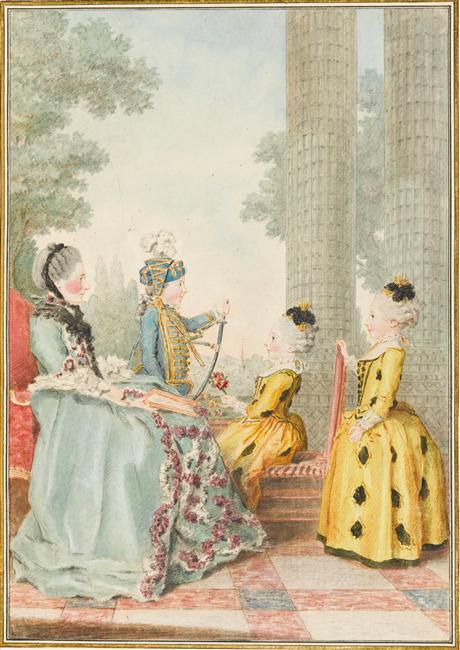
Louis Carrogis Carmontelle, Madame de Montullé and her children, musée Condé, Chantilly

Élisabeth Françoise de Montullé, née Élisabeth Françoise Haudry (1727 – 13 March 1800) was a French noblewoman and salon-holder. She was the daughter of the fermier général André Haudry, wife of the magistrate Jean-Baptiste de Montullé and mother of the painter Émilie-Sophie de Montullé.
