= Lancelot-Théodore Turpin de Crissé =

French painter

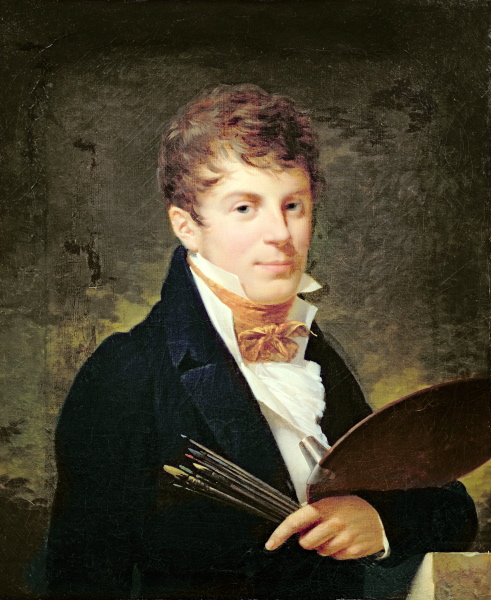
Lancelot-Théodore Turpin de Crissé; portrait by Louis-André-Gabriel Bouchet (after 1800)

Lancelot-Théodore, Comte de Turpin de Crissé (French: [lɑ̃slo teɔdɔʁ tyʁpɛ̃ də kʁise]; 9 July 1782 – 15 May 1859) was a French writer and painter from Paris. His most familiar works are landscapes with structures, usually set in Italy.

== Biography ==
His father was Colonel Henri Roland Lancelot Turpin de Crissé, an amateur painter of some note. The family was financially ruined by the Revolution and had to flee Paris. Still, he was able to finish his studies in Switzerland and Italy, thanks to the patronage of Marie-Gabriel-Florent-Auguste de Choiseul-Gouffier. Upon his return to France in 1809, he exhibited at the Salon. He was then granted the protection of the Imperial Family and became Chamberlain to the former Empress Josephine after her divorce. In 1810, he accompanied her on a trip to Switzerland and Savoy, returning with a large album of drawings.

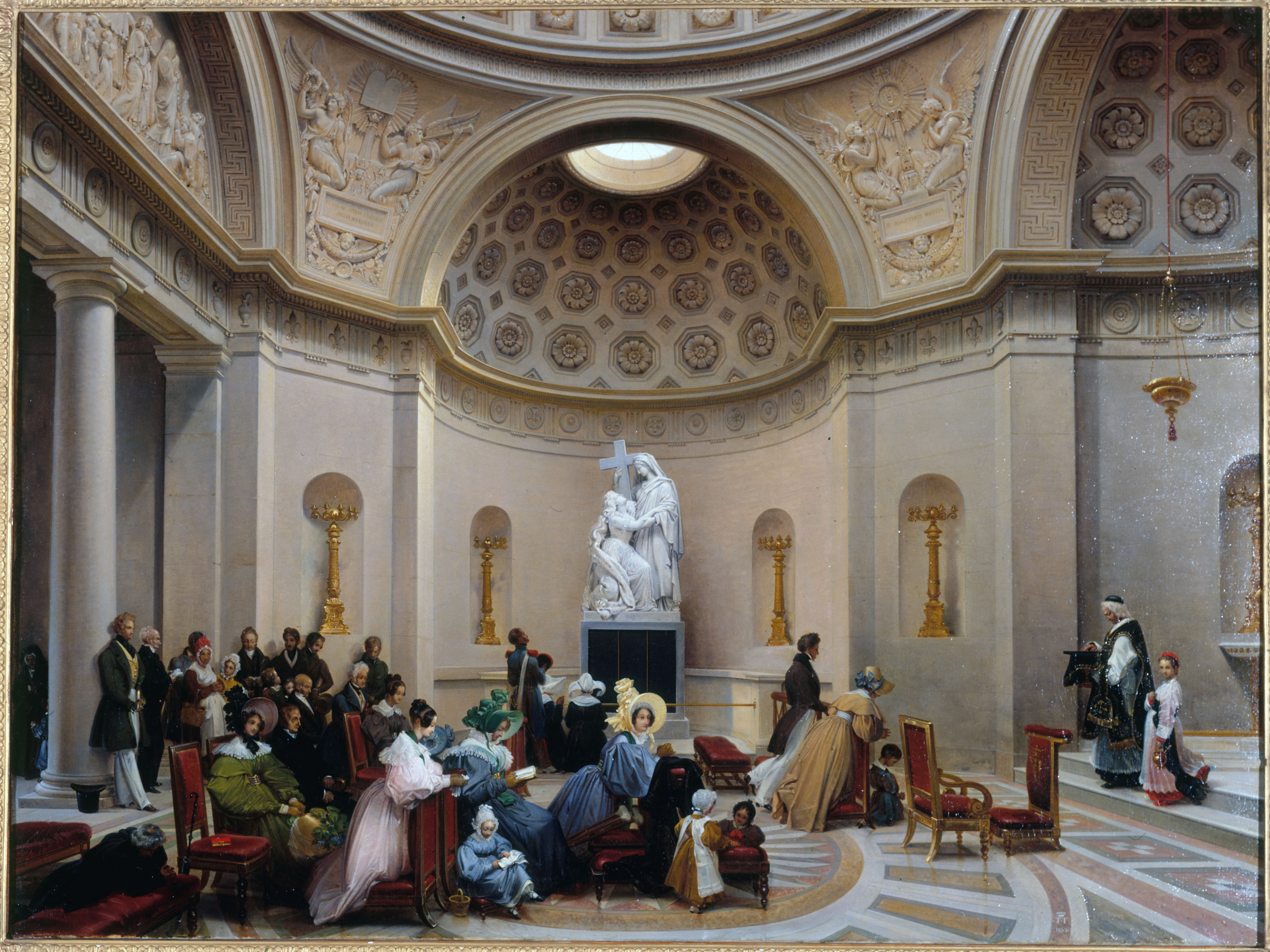
Mass at the Chapelle Expiatoire (1835)

In 1813, he married into a noble family and received a large inheritance from a cousin. Three years later, he became a member of the Académie des Beaux-Arts. He was then appointed to the "Board of Royal Museums" (1824) and Inspector-General for the "Département des Beaux-Arts" (1825). That same year, he was awarded the Légion d'honneur. He was named an honorary member of the Maison du Roi in 1829. During this period, he made three lengthy trips to Italy, the last on the occasion of his appointment to the Accademia di Belle Arti di Venezia.

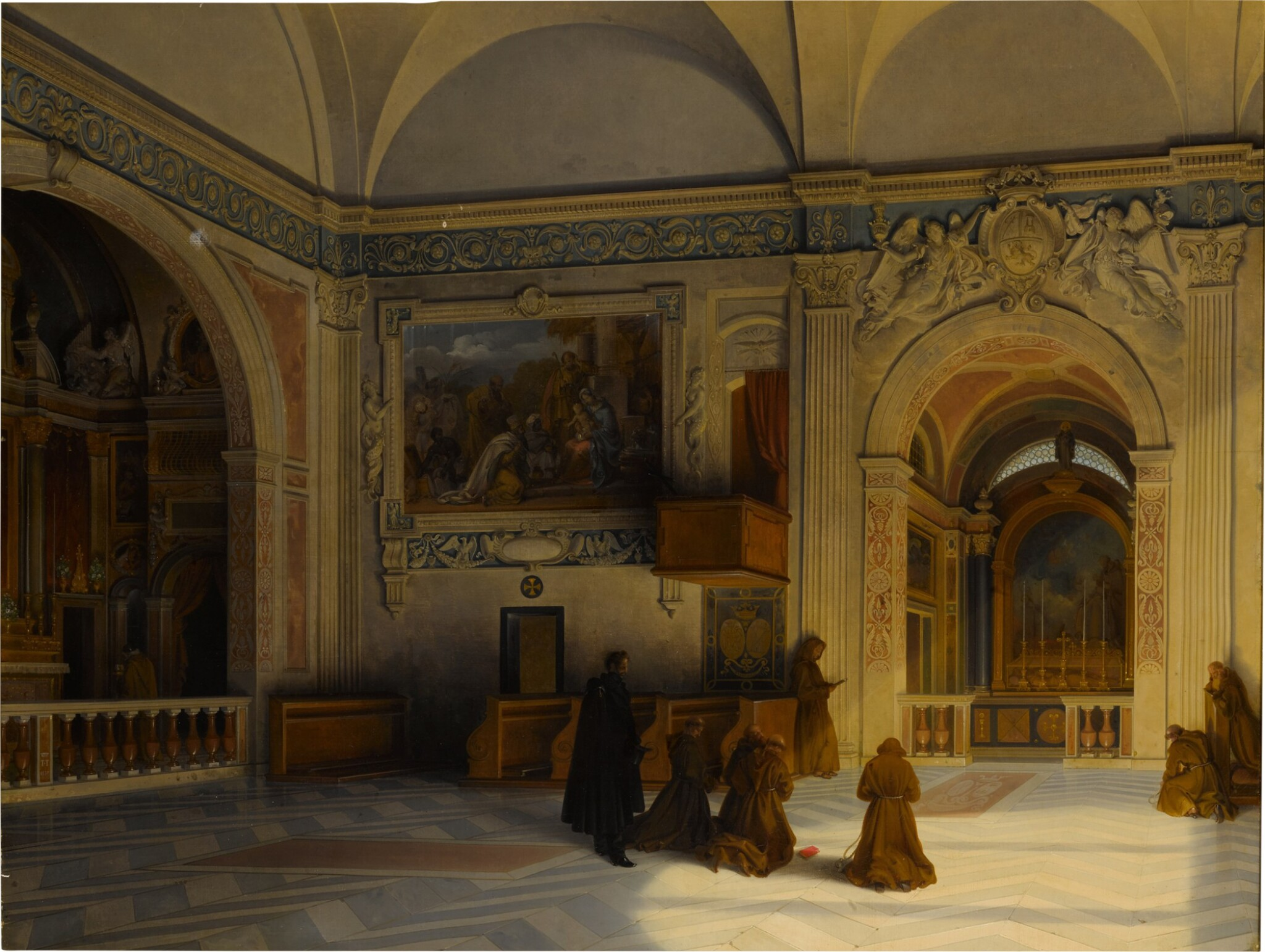
Monks in a church interior (1837)

Despite his association with the Bonapartes, he was a staunch Legitimist. He resigned all of his offices following the advent of the July Monarchy in 1830 and returned to private life. He continued to exhibit, however, including a show at the Royal Academy of Arts in 1832. Three years later, he published Souvenirs du vieux Paris, exemples d'architecture de temps et de styles divers. He continued to advocate for the Bourbons until his death.

He was also known as an avid art collector, promoting many contemporary artists by purchasing their works. Among them were Blondel, Granet and Ingres. His collection also included antiquities, which he donated to the Musée des Beaux-Arts d'Angers. From December 2006 to April 2007, the museum presented a major retrospective of his works to make his name known again.
