= Bertaux =

Bertaux may refer to:

== People ==
- Daniel Bertaux (1939–), French sociologist
- Hélène Bertaux (1825–1909), French sculptor and women's rights advocate
- Jean Duplessis-Bertaux (1747–1819), French artist
- Pierre Bertaux (1907–1986), French resistance fighter and scholar of German literature

== Other ==
- Maison Bertaux, a French pâtisserie in London
- Ouled Hamla, a town in Algeria called Bertaux from about 1830 to 1962

== See also ==
- Bertot, Bertaud, Berteau, Berteaux, Bertaux, Barto
