= Bertaud =

Bertaud is a French-language surname derived from the Germanic dithematic given name Berhtwald (or similar) produced from stems berht, 'bright' and wald, 'power' Notable people with the name include:

- Alain Bertaud (born 1939), French urban planner and author
- Dimitry Bertaud (born 1998), French-Congolese footballer
- Jean Bertaud (1898–1987), French politician
- Lloyd W. Bertaud (1895–1927), American aviator
- Lucie Bertaud (born 1985), French boxer and mixed martial arts fighter
- Marie Rosalie Bertaud (1738 – early 19th century), French engraver

== See also ==
- Bertot, Bertaud, Berteau, Berteaux, Bertaux, Barto
