= Émilie-Sophie de Montullé =

French painter

Émilie-Sophie de Montullé, marquise Turpin de Crissé (8 May 1756 – 12 May 1816) was a French painter. She was the daughter of the magistrate Jean-Baptiste-François de Montullé (1721–1787) and the salon-holder Élisabeth Haudry (1727–1800). On 18 January 1775, she married Henri Roland Lancelot Turpin de Crissé (1754 – before 1799).
