= Sophie Alouf-Bertot =

Belgian graphic designer (born 1945)

- Born: 1945 (age 80–81)
- Education: Institut Sainte Marie, La Cambre
- Occupation: Painter · graphic designer · educator
- Years active: 1969-present
- Website: https://www.sophiealouf.com/

Sophie Alouf-Bertot (born 1945) is a Belgian graphic designer, painter, and teacher living and working in Brussels.

== Education ==
Sophie Alouf first studied at the Institut Sainte Marie in Brussels. After that, she joined the graphic arts department of the National Superior School for Architecture and Visual Arts La Cambre (ENSAAV), where she received training in the workshop of Luc Van Malderen, who was the head of the department at the time.

Typography was taught by Fernand Baudin. She has mentioned that it is easy to settle into the world of graphic design because her mother was one of the first students at La Cambre in that field and also taught graphic communication there. Her speciality was everything that concerned the third dimension—shop window design, etc. Sophie Alouf-Bertot obtained her diploma in 1969.

== Design practice ==
After graduating from La Cambre, Sophie Alouf-Bertot started working at Elizabeth Arden, where her responsibilities included designing shop windows in the Benelux countries. Despite the financial security offered by the company, after about a year and a half, she decided to leave Elizabeth Arden and set up a design studio with her husband, Sami Alouf, who had also studied at La Cambre, where the couple met. After graduating, Sami, who comes from Lebanon, had gone to Beirut to open a studio. In 1970, they got married, and Sophie and Sami opened a workshop together named "S+S Alouf Design".

In their collaboration, Sophie has a predilection for bright colours, contrasts and illustrative work, whereas Sami specializes in creating logotypes, typography and anything connected with corporate identity programs. Although they have specific roles in their practice and sometimes one of them exclusively deals with the creation, their preferred approach is to make final decisions for the finished version on the design together.

One of their first clients was Woluwe and Westland Shopping Centers, which commissioned them to create a graphic identity as well as posters for thematic exhibitions that were organised every two to three months. This resulted in the design of about 200 posters of a luxurious finish, as they used a screen printing technique to produce them. These posters were produced in small runs, which made this printing method possible.

Sophie Alouf-Bertot and Sami Alouf have designed orientation systems for several institutions. Their conviction was that orientation systems must not only be clear and easy to read but also attractive; therefore, one should not limit the colour scheme to the conventional black and white. However, in their opinion, colour must be used primarily to emphasize visual information, rather than to demonstrate creativity for its own sake. They believe that the task of a graphic designer is to take into account individual characteristics of every project and building, rather than use stereotyped signage.

In the shopping center in Nivelles, they created an orientation system that also served as a trademark, using the basic elements "N" and an arrow. Two illuminated panels made out of those arrows, placed at the main entrance, made it distinct from the entrance doors for the staff. The same arrow-shaped panels guided customers from the parking area towards the main entrance, above which was an illuminated shop sign measuring 26 feet. Inside the building, a number of arrows arranged one above another created an impression of a street crossing.

For the Université Libre de Bruxelles (ULB), they took another approach. They selected a different colour related to each department, which then guided students and visitors through the campus. The colour code was supplemented by about 40 pictographs.

They also designed an orientation system for the festival hall of the Palais des Beaux-Arts in Brussels, built by Victor Horta. There, they adapted the style of the building by using enamelled steel plates of the same beige colour as the walls of the building, and bright green or bright blue letters and arrows, thereby creating a distinguished, bright, and friendly look.

Other clients of S+S Alouf Design include the Design Center in Brussels, the Commission of the European Communities Culture and Communication Directorate and Media Program, as well as international projects for hotels such as the hotel chain Sheraton Management Corporation (Starwood) in Africa, Europe, the United States, and the Middle East, for which they designed trademarks and identities.

In an interview with Sara De Bondt for the exhibition at the Design Museum Ghent in 2019, Sophie Alouf-Bertot describes her working method. She uses a cutting and pasting technique for designing her posters. Clippings glued on see-through cellophane sheets allow her to experiment with color, shapes, and composition until the desired result is made. After completing the poster image, she would add placeholder text to design the layout, approaching it as a complete image rather than as separate text and picture elements. She also uses painting, which gives her even more freedom.

== Teaching ==
Sophie Alouf-Bertot devoted a large part of her professional life to teaching. From 1979 to 1992, she taught graphic arts in the Graphic Arts Workshop at the Institut St. Luc in Brussels and headed the department from 1992 to 2010. During this time she gave lectures on communication through image and colour until 2004, after being invited to be a jury member and filling in for someone several times at ENSAAV (La Cambre) Typography Department in 1988.

== Painting ==
In 2020, Sophie Alouf-Bertot dedicated a large part of her time to painting.

== Group exhibitions and catalogues ==
Sophie Alouf-Bertot has participated in several group exhibitions in Brussels, Kortrijk, Beirut, Metz, Amsterdam, Luxembourg, Paris and Athens, exhibiting works by her studio and her paintings. These include:

- 15 October – 21 November 1976: Exhibition and catalogue of the Milton Glaser exhibition at the Royal Museums of Fine Arts of Belgium in Brussels.
- 1978: International Poster Biennale in Warsaw.
- 1978: Biennale of Graphic Design in Brno.
- 4 April – 4 May 1980: Exhibition "Poster Art in Belgium form 1900 – 1980" at Galerie CGER in Brussels. The catalogue included a poster of the Woluwe Shopping Center.
- 2012: Group exhibition of paintings at the Brussels Seed Factory.
- 2013: "75 ans de Spirou" at the Brussels Seed Factory.
- 25 October 2019 – 16 February 2020: "Off the Grid", a Belgian graphic design exhibition at the Design Museum Gent.

Several posters by S+S Alouf Design are in the collection of the Royal Museums of Fine Arts of Belgium.

== Sources ==
- "Sophie Alouf". Issuu.
- "Sophie Alouf". boulderton (in French).
- "Do Graphic Designers Make Good Graphic Design Curators?". Eye on Design. 2019-10-30.
- "Off the Grid. Belgian Graphic Design from the 1960s and 1970s as Seen by Sara De Bondt". Design Museum Gent.
