= Pierre Bertaux =

French resistance fighter and German literature scholar

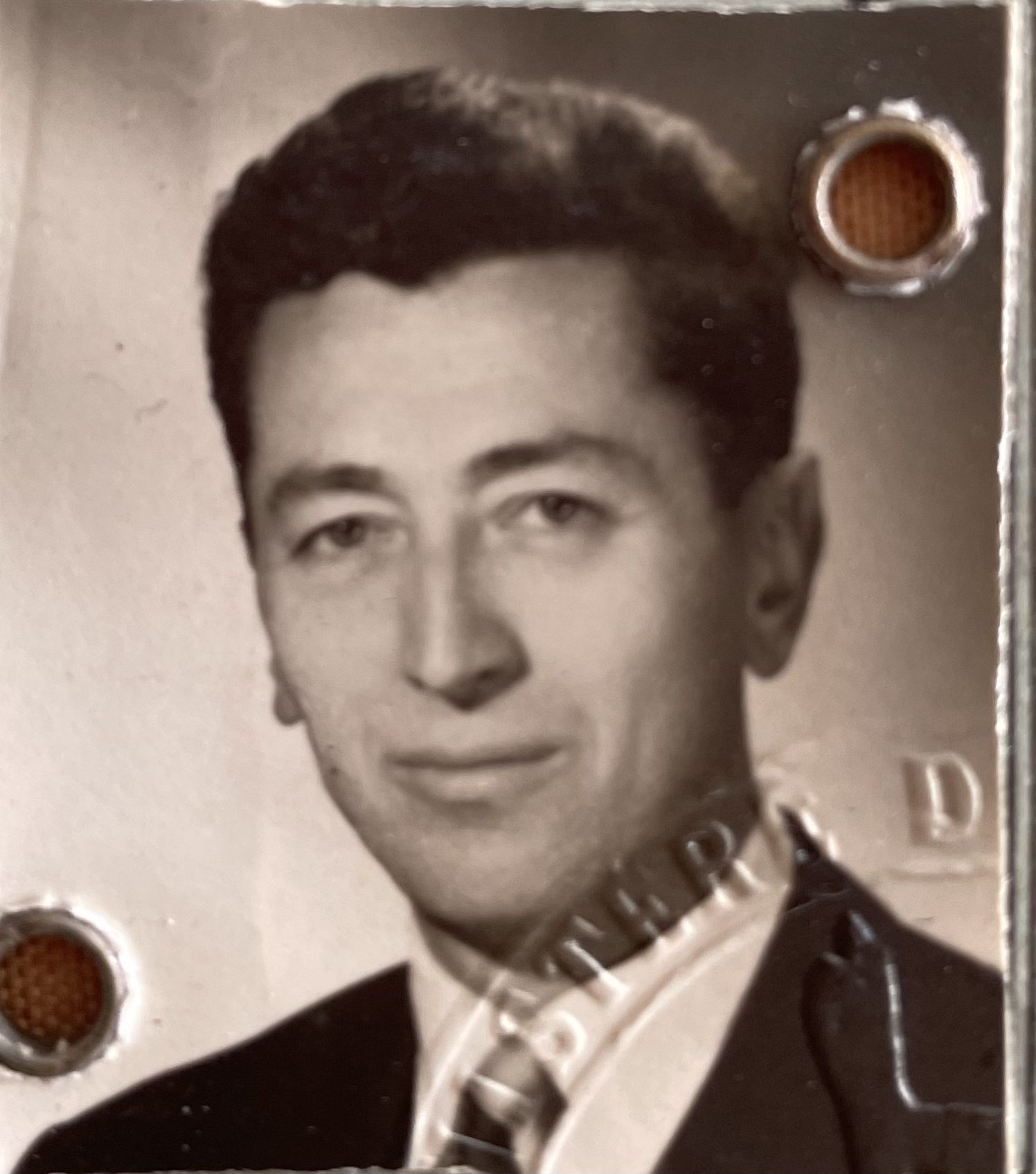
Image of Pierre Bertaux

Pierre Bertaux (8 October 1907 in Lyon – 14 August 1986 in Saint-Cloud, Hauts-de-Seine) was a noted French resistance fighter and scholar of German literature. While holding administrative positions, he also wrote on Friedrich Hölderlin. He participated in the French resistance in Toulouse, where as a Commissioner of the Republic he imposed Charles de Gaulle's authority during the liberation of France. After the war he was a high-ranking police officer.

In 1968 he founded a Department of German Language and Literature at the New Sorbonne in Asnières. In 1970 he received the Goethe Medal, and in 1975 the Heinrich Heine prize of the city of Düsseldorf. He had three sons, two of whom have become renowned academics on their own right: Daniel Bertaux and Jean-Loup Bertaux.

== Work ==
French

- Hölderlin, Essai de biographie intérieure, Paris, Hachette, 1936
- La mutation humaine, 1964
- La libération de Toulouse et de sa région, éd. Hachette, 1973
- Hölderlin ou le temps d'un poète, Paris, Gallimard, 1983
- Mémoires interrompus par Pierre Bertaux, Hansgerd Schulte, Presses Sorbonne Nouvelle, 2000 ISBN 2-910212-14-9
- Un normalien à Berlin, lettres 1927 1933

German

- Friedrich Hölderlin. Frankfurt/Main 1981 und 2000
- Hölderlin und die Französische Revolution. Frankfurt/Main 1969, Berlin 1990
- Afrika. Von der Vorgeschichte bis zu den Staaten der Gegenwart. Frankfurt/M. 1966
- Mutation der Menschheit - Diagnosen und Prognosen. Frankfurt/M. 1963
