= Jean-Baptiste de Montullé =

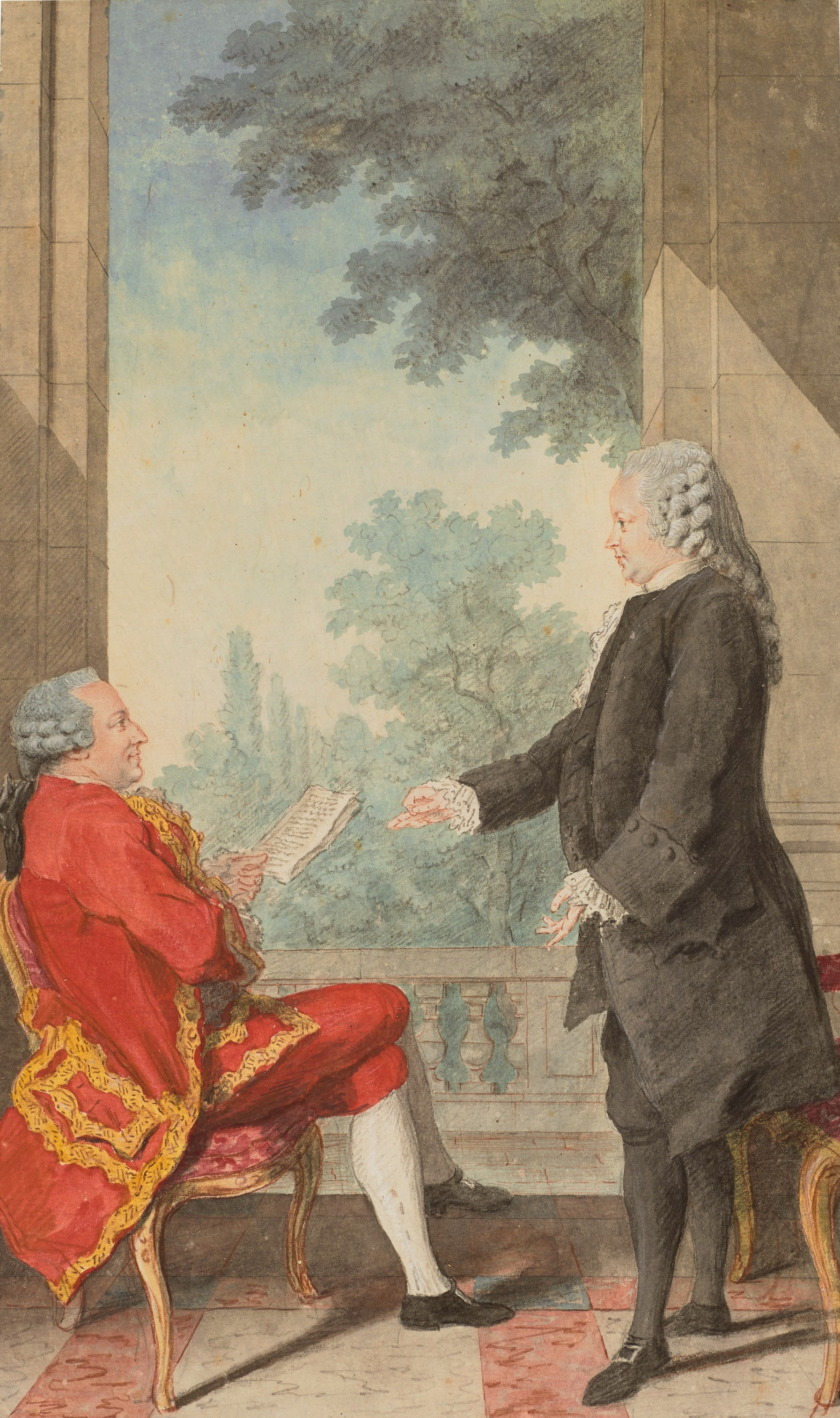
Portrait of Jean-Baptiste-François de Montullé (en rouge) with his brother-in-law Jean-Baptiste d'Albertas, drawn by Carmontelle

Jean-Baptiste-François de Montullé (3 February 1721 – 26 August 1787) was a French magistrate, who was born and died in Paris. His daughter Émilie-Sophie became an artist, whilst Jean-Baptiste himself was an art collector, though he had to sell off his collection thanks to financial difficulties at the end of 1783 - it included five paintings by Antoine Watteau. He was also executor to the collector Jean de Jullienne.

== Biography ==
Son of Jean-Baptiste de Montullé, seigneur d'Hangsé et de Salles, conseiller au Parlement of Paris and Françoise Glucq († 1730), Jean-Baptiste-François de Montullé was received as conseiller au Parlement de Paris on February 10, 1741 in the fifth Chambre des enquestes (later in the third). After the resignation of his uncle, Claude Glucq, he became a Conseiller d'État (France), and in 1754 acquired the office of Secretary of the Commandments of Queen Marie Leszczyńska; on her death, this office became that of the Dauphine. Grand bailli de Melun et de Moret, he wore the sword.

In March 1750, he married Élisabeth Haudry, daughter of farmer-general André Haudry and a woman of great spirit. Together they raised five children, and named one of their daughters Émilie.

A great Bookworm like his father, and a lover of art and science, he collected paintings and drawings by old masters and modern artists, as well as fashionable curiosities. His wife, Baroness de Saint-Port and Dame de Sainte-Assise, contributed to her husband's cabinet. In 1766, she commissioned an oval painting from Claude-Joseph Vernet, Les pêcheurs à la ligne, which she had translated into an engraving by Marie Rosalie Bertaud.

Jean-Baptiste-François de Montullé writes an extract from the Mémoires de French Academy of Sciences and an abridged version of Buffon's Histoire naturelle for his children's instruction. On October 16, 1764, he was elected a free associate member of the Académie royale de peinture et de sculpture.

His grandfather, Jean Glucq (†1718), founder of a dyeing and fine cloth factory at Gobelins, had chosen his wife's nephew, Jean de Jullienne - master dyer - to succeed him at the head of the establishment, but the three Montullé children remained its sponsors.

In 1748, along with his sisters, he inherited the Château de Sainte-Assise in Seine-Port from his other uncle, Jean-Baptiste Glucq, and the prosperous family manufacture from Jean de Jullienne in 1766. Having been named universal legatee and executor of his will by Jean de Jullienne on May 24, 1764, he had a Catalogue raisonné of all the objets d'art in his estate published in advance in February 1767.

He sold the Château de Sainte-Assise in 1773 and bought the Château de la Briche in Épinay-sur-Seine in August of the same year. However, serious financial difficulties forced him to part with the property in 1781, and his art collections - including five paintings by Antoine Watteau - were sold at the end of 1783 under the initials “M.T.” at the Hôtel Bullion in an attempt to compensate his brother-in-law, Jean-Baptiste d'Albertas (1716-1790), who had demanded his wife's share of the inheritance. In 1784, having rented out his grand hotel on rue du Cherche-Midi, he tried to save his factory from being sold by moving in with three of his children.

But by 1786, he was living alone at 50 Galerie Montpensier in the Palais-Royal, where he died the following year; the last remaining assets of his former collections were dispersed at a final sale on November 19, 1787.

He is buried in his ancestors' vault in Saint-Séverin, Paris.

A drawing by Louis Carrogis Carmontelle shows him seated, in red, conversing with his young nephew, Jean-Baptiste-Suzanne d'Albertas, whom he often entertained at Sainte-Assise.

== Sources ==
- Notes prises aux archives de l'État-civil de Paris, par le comte de Chastellux, Paris, 1875, p. 443.
