= Maximilien Vox =

French cartoonist and writer (1894–1974)

- Born: Samuel Théodore William Monod; 16 December 1894; Condé-sur-Noireau
- Died: 18 December 1974; Lurs
- Occupations: Publisher, calligrapher, writer
- Employers: Editions Arts et Métiers Graphiques; Beaux-Arts de Paris; Éditions Denoël

Maximilien Vox (real name: Samuel William Théodore Monod) was a French writer, cartoonist, illustrator, publisher, journalist, critic art theorist and historian of the French letter and typography.

He was born on 16 December 1894 in Condé-sur-Noireau in Calvados, where his father was a minister, and educated at the Corneille school in Rouen.

In 1914 he published his humorous cartoons in L'Humanité, Floréal and La Guerre Sociale and became editor of Le Mot, the review produced by Paul Iribe. Most of his cartoons were signed by Sam Monod or Esmono. Monod adopted a number of aliases before settling on Maximilien Vox. After getting married he went to Paris to learn typography, and in 1926 was awarded the Prix Blumenthal, worth 20,000 Francs, for a series of 24 book covers.

During the Second World War, he worked as a department head for the Ministry of Information while continuing his editorial activities. In 1942 he founded The Union Bibliophile de France, which published artworks.

After the war he concentrated on typography and created in 1949 the professional magazine Characters, which he edited until 1964. He created the VOX-ATypI classification of type characters.

In 1952 he moved to Lurs to live in a house he called Monodière and founded Rencontres internationales de Lure. He died there on 18 December 1974 and was buried in Lurs. He had married Eliane Poulain in 1917 and had five sons.
