= Catherine Delcroix =

French sociologist

Catherine Delcroix (born 1955) is a French sociologist whose work employs methods drawn from sociology and biographical tools. Her major sociological works concern poverty, inequality and homelessness. She is a professor of sociology in the French Strasbourg University and a fellow of the “UMR Printemps”, a French research institute specializing in sociological and biographical studies.

Catherine Delcroix is a member of the Executing Committee of the European Sociological Association (or ESA), an association aimed to facilitate sociological research, teaching and communication on European issues, and to build networks between European sociologists. She is also a member of its Qualitative Methods Research Network.

== Principal works ==
- 2001, Ombres et lumières de la famille Nour. Comment certains résistent à la précarité ?, Payot, 258 pages (deuxième édition augmentée en poche, Payot Rivages, mars 2005), Paris
- 1998, (with Anne Guyaux), Double mixte, le mariage comme lieu de rencontre de deux cultures, L’Harmattan, en coédition avec l’éditeur belge " Contradictions " et l’ADRI, 132 pages, Paris
- 1996, (with Chahla Beski) Des médiatrices dans les quartiers fragilisés : le lien, La Documentation Française, 136 pages, Paris
- 1996, « L’immigration, histoires et mémoires, la présence des pères », Informations sociales, n° 55, CNAF, Paris
- 1986, Espoirs et réalités de la femme arabe : Egypte-Algérie, L’Harmattan, 236 pages, Paris
