= Berteau =

Berteau is a French surname of the same origin as Bertaud. Notable people with the surname include:

- Martin Berteau (1691–1771), French musician
- Victoire Berteau (born 2000), French cyclist

== See also ==
- Bertot, Bertaud, Berteau, Berteaux, Bertaux, Barto
