= Fabrizio Bertot =

Italian politician

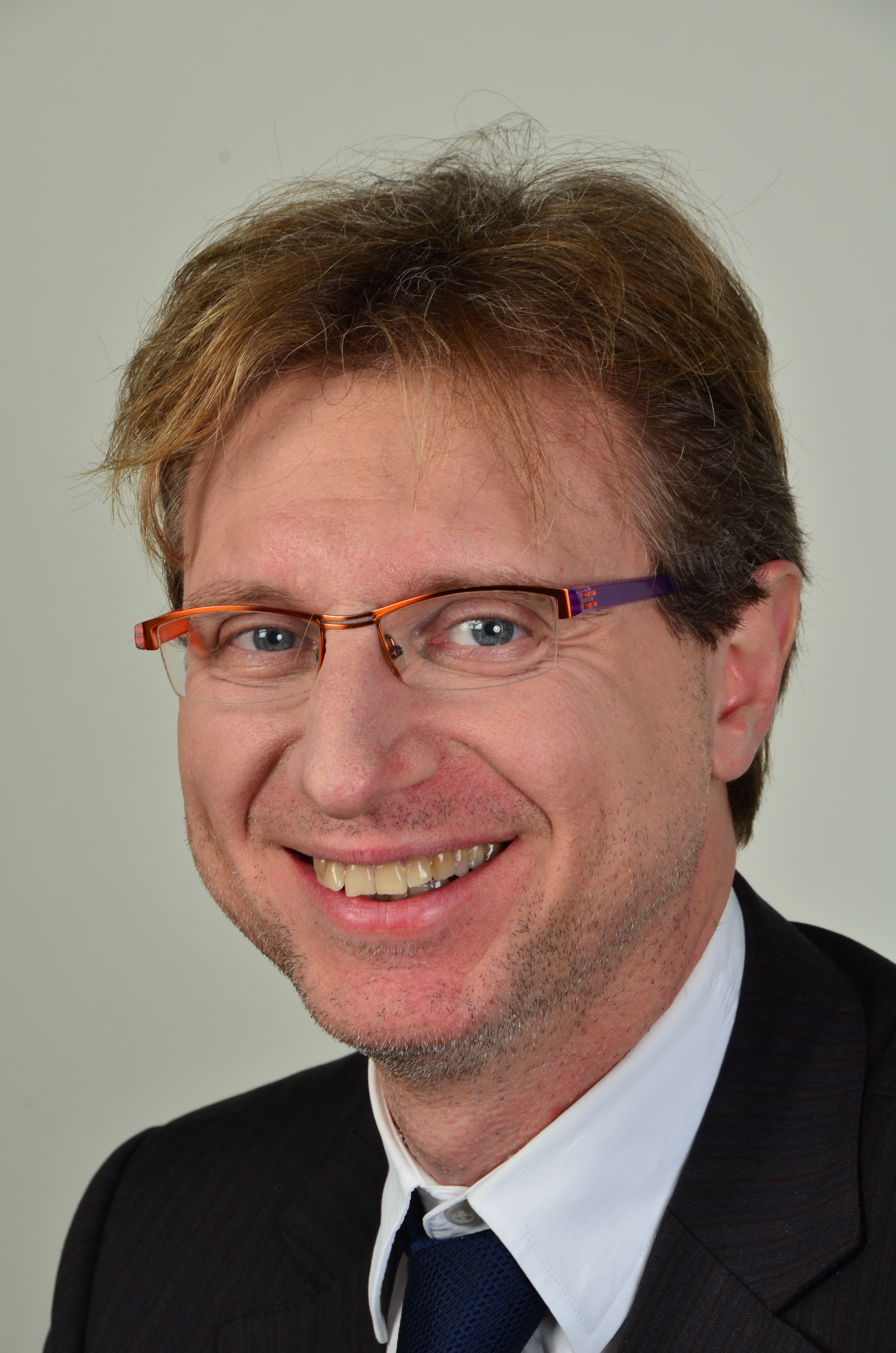
Bertot in February 2014

Fabrizio Bertot (born 23 February 1967, Turin) is an Italian politician, member of the European Parliament from 12 April 2013 to 30 June 2014 for the Berlusconi's party PDL (later FI). Ukraine, on 2 May 2018, has forbidden Bertot entry for three years with blocking of the right to dispose of assets and the property belonging. From 2003 to 2012 he was the Major of Rivarolo Canavese for the centre-right coalition.
