= André Haudry =

Fermier général (1688–1769)

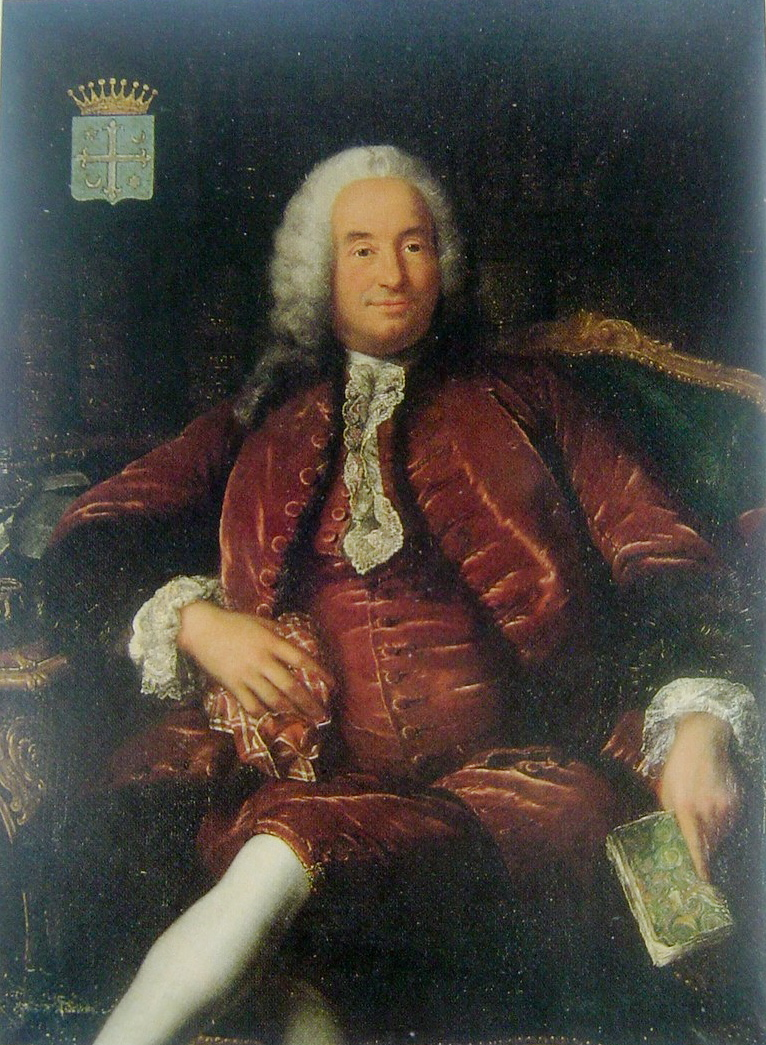
- Haudry by an unknown artist
- Born: 1688
- Died: 1769 (aged 80–81)
- Occupation: Fermier général

André Haudry, lord of Soucy (hamlet of Fontenay-lès-Briis), Fontenay, Janvry, de Segrez and other places (7 November 1688 – 30 December 1769) was an 18th-century French fermier général.

== Biography ==
Born in Corbeil-Essonnes. He was successively assistant tax collector in Corbeil, head of the Paris tax office, tax collector for Brittany (1738–1740), involved in the king's affairs in 1740, deputy tax collector for the Aides and Domaines (1726–1744), then tax collector general from 1745 to 1769.

In 1740, he purchased the office of advisor-secretary to the King, House and Crown of France, which conferred a first-degree knighthood, resigning in 1765.

He died in his Paris home in 1769 and was buried in the chapel of his château de Soucy on 1 January 1770. His body was moved to the communal cemetery in Fontenay-lès-Briis by decision of its town council in 1857.
