= Fernand Baudin =

Belgian Book Designer and Author

- Born: 1918; Bachte-Maria-Leerne
- Died: 2005 (aged 86–87); Grez-Doiceau
- Education: ENSAD La Cambre
- Known for: Book designer, author and typographer

Fernand Baudin (1918, Bachte-Maria-Leerne - 2005, Grez-Doiceau) was a Belgian book designer, author, typographer, and teacher. Baudin was active in the field of graphic design in many ways and described himself as a “typographiste”. He was part of national and international typographic organizations, like ATypI (Association Typographique Internationale), the Graphica-Belgica Prize, and Rencontres internationales de Lure.

Throughout his career he focused on the importance of (hand)writing in graphic design. He wrote and designed two books: How Typography Works (And why it is important) and L'Effet Gutenberg, that summarize his ideas on writing and designing.

After his death, because of his influence in the history of design, the Prize for the Most Beautiful Books in Brussels and Wallonia was named after him, called the Fernand Baudin Prize.

== Education ==
Since his early youth, Baudin expressed an interest in art and literature, despite his father's disapproval. He consumed book after book, researched the various typefaces, and learned how they were printed. He sent his first drawing to the Verviers daily Le Jour: the sketch of a prominent citizen.

In 1936 the family moved from Ghent to Brussels, where they agreed that Fernand could follow night classes at the Academy for Fine Arts in Elsene and by day would work as an apprentice with the printing house Tilbury.

He extended his education at La Cambre, The National High School for Decorative Arts in Brussels, with a course in book decoration, that he later changed to typography. One of his teachers at the Academy for Fine Arts in Elsene, Maurice Gaspar, showed him the special issue of Arts & métiers graphiques, that influenced his change to the typography course. His first efforts as a printer were done with typefaces from the school, which had type specimens such like Futura and Garamont. It had body types sizes from 8 to 18, which back then was quite exceptional in Belgium. Eight of the works that he made at La Cambre have survived.

Fernand Baudin was very well-read. His library shows a great amount of high end literature, that gives a glimpse at his education and ideas. With the change to typography in his third year, he continued his education as a book designer in private study that consisted mainly of professional literature in several languages. His collection included books by and about Marcus Aurelius and Stanley Morison. He studied the work of, among others, D. B. Updike, Edward Johnston, and Arthur S. Osley.

Baudin has been described as someone with a lively mind; his numerous interests, even outside his field, make him a many-sided and very likeable person. With short and striking statements he revealed his fascinating personality, for example: “There are two levels of design: that of the page and that of the whole book. Everyone should be familiar with composing a page. The whole book will always remain the task of the designer”.

After leaving school and spending time as a prisoner of war Fernand searched for a stable employment, which was with the Brussels branch of type-foundry ‘Amsterdam’. During the twelve years of his employment, from 1954 to 1966, he met with different designers such like Dick Dooijes and Willem Ovink. Throughout his career he received assignments mainly for small-scale printed matter and so stayed on as freelance typographer and consultant.

He later donated his archive to the Free University of Brussels. The total collection was classified by Baudin himself. It includes, besides a large number of publications and books, more than a hundred files, such like correspondence, manuscripts, typescripts, proofs, and prins of his articles and conferences, as well as many documents that give insight in his career as a graphic designer.

== Organisations ==
Baudin was part of national and international typographic organisations, like ATypI (Association Typographique Internationale), the Graphica-Belgica Prize, Rencontres internationales de Lure, the Royal Library of Belgium, and the Plantin-Moretus Prize.

Through all these organisations he met with different graphic designers, with whom he kept a (handwritten) correspondence throughout his career: Stanley Morison, Gerrit Noordzij, Rosemary Sassoon, Nicolete Gray, John Dreyfus...

=== ATypI ===
Association Typographique Internationale (ATypI), is a French society that provides meetings for people professionally or otherwise concerned with typography. It was founded in 1957 and Baudin was a member from its beginning. In 1991 he became vice-president. At a meeting in Hamburg on 12 June 1985 he suggested the idea for ‘A tentative scheme for the abc programme or series of the so-called Printing and the Hand of Man project, abc and more letterforms’. For quite a while the Dutch were superior on these meetings, whereas Baudin was the only Belgian present.

=== Graphica-Belgica Prize ===
The Graphica-Belgica Prize is an award that is given to the best technically and graphically designed book. It was founded in 1962 on the initiative of Count de Villages de Clercamps. Baudin won the prize two times before he was asked to be a member of the jury. He edited and designed the reports.

=== Rencontres internationales de Lure ===
Rencontres internationales de Lure is an organisation where different artists come together every year and talk about various problems in the graphic arts. It was established in the early fifties by Maximilien Vox, together with Robert Ranc and Jean Garcia. Baudin attended from 1958 to 1974. With every meeting there would be a report published which would include the topics that were discussed. From 1960 onwards Baudin made same-like reports for the Belgian press, first in La revue graphique, later Imprivaria, and Grafisch tijdschrift. He edited Dossier Michel Butor (21st meeting) and Dossier mise en page (22nd meeting). He concluded his activities with Dossier Vox (25th meeting).

=== Royal Library of Belgium ===
In 1956 Fernand Baudin approached the chief curator at the Royal Library, Herman Liebaers, and asked him if there was a job available. Liebaers, who appreciated well-designed books, saw an opportunity to introduce a house style for the library and so hired Fernand as a typographic consultant. During his career he worked regularly for the library. At the request by Liebaers, he even wrote a paper entitled L’écriture des écritures: la lettre avant l’image.

=== Plantin-Moretus Prize ===
The Plantin-Moretus Prize was founded by the Federation of Belgian Publishers. It awards the 20 best designed Belgian books of the year by giving them gold, silver, and bronze medals. Fernand Baudin was elected chairman in 1975.

== Writings ==
Fernand Baudin works were dominated by his love for the written word, particularly handwriting in graphic design and its importance. He argued that literacy involves a knowledge about how to form letters and how to order them into a coherent visual structure. The space between letters, words and lines is as important as the type itself. He called this ‘visual editing of text’. At the end of his career he wrote two books that sum up his ideas on writing and designing: How Typography Works (And why it is important) and L'Effet Gutenberg.

His work is characterized by its simplicity and legibility. “It is for the sake of the letter, for the sake of reading and ultimately for the sake of the reader that printing was invented now five hundred years ago”. His typography can be described as dynamic due to his so-called ‘scissors and paste’ work method. He always supplied one or more lay-outs, often done in ‘calque’, with information about where to place the illustrations and other things.

Baudin's career came to an end just when the computer became an everyday object in the public's lives. Although he kept his distance from it, he still discussed the dangers and possibilities of it. Throughout his career there had been numerous inventions, such like the typewriter and with the computer adding to it, and it became more and more important for Baudin to talk about the importance of (hand)writing in graphic design. Because the computer made typography available to the masses, it was important that we should become more critical. “Our civilization of word and image does not depend on the computer. It depends on script and typeface. With computer assistance. For the time being. While waiting for something better. It is therefore necessary to learn and to teach how to distinguish between well-drawn letters and bad ones. Whatever the technique used to create them. One does not have to be a calligrapher to do this, just as one does not need to be a member of the Académie Française to teach French”.

=== How Typography Works (And why it is important) ===
How Typography Works is the English version of La Typografie au Tableau Noir which was first published in French in 1984. The book gives a general introduction to the subject of letterforms and layout. It discusses among others the variations and the principles of letter design but also the layout of pages from papyrus fragments to the modern newspaper. How Typography Works also gives a glimpse at Baudin's philosophical ideas on the meaning of literacy in the modern age. It can be used by teachers as a manual. It's written in Baudin's handwriting and is accompanied by his own illustrations. The result is a dynamic work in which the character of Baudin is prominently visible.

Before How Typography Works, Fernand Baudin wrote De drukletter (1965). Which could also be considered as a manual for typography. It includes chapters on various typefaces, type sizes, book formats, punctuation marks...

=== L’Effet Gutenberg ===
L’Effet Gutenberg (1994) talks about 500 years of typography. The first pages are on pre-Gutenberg manuscripts followed by chapters on Plantin, Moxon, Fournier, Baskerville, Bodoni, Thibaudeau, Morison, Tschichold & Zapf. Afterwards there are pages with considerations about writing and the computer and to finish there are annexes on Morison, Kandinsky, Bayer, Tschichold, Albers...

=== Selected writings ===
Next to his two books How Typography Works (And why it is important) and L'Effet Gutenberg, Fernand Baudin has written essays on writing, typography and (book) design in the Belgian and international periodicals Arts et techniques graphiques, Cahiers GUTenberg, Letterletter, and Visible Language, amongst others.

- Baudin, Fernand, "The manuscript book", The Penrose Annual, London, Hastings House, vol. 67, décembre 1974, p. 121-136.
- Baudin, Fernand, "Education in the making and shaping of written words", by Rosemary Sassoon, Computers and Typography, England, Oxford, 1993, p. 102-129.
- Baudin, Fernand, How Typography Works (And why it is Important), Lund Humphries Publishers Ltd, 1989. (in French: 'La Typographie au tableau noir', Retz, 1984)
- Baudin, Fernand, L'Effet Gutenberg, Éditions du Cercle de la Librairie, 1994.
- Baudin, Fernand, "Het gedrukte boek in West-Europa van de 17de eeuw tot het einde van de 19de eeuw", by H.D.L. Vervliet in, Liber Librorum: 5000 jaar boekkunst, Brussel, 1973, p. 429.
- Baudin, Fernand, De drukletter: vorm, vervaardiging, indeling, toepassing, Brussel, 1965.

He was also initiator, designer and editor of the "Dossiers" for the Association des Compagnons de Lure, Rencontres internationales de Lure, Lurs-en-Provence (1969–1975).

- Baudin, Fernand, Blanchard, Gérard, Lagneau, Gérard, Richaudeau, François (dir.), 'MMcL', Rencontres internationales de Lure, Lurs-en-Provence, 1969.
- Baudin, Fernand (dir.), Dossier Butor, Rencontres internationales de Lure, Lurs-en-Provence, 1971.
- Baudin, Fernand, Dreyfus, John (dir.), Dossier Mise en page, Rencontres internationales de Lure, Lurs-en-Provence, 1972.
- Baudin, Fernand, Dreyfus, John (dir.), Dossier A-Z, Rencontres internationales de Lure, Lurs-en-Provence, 1973.
- Baudin, Fernand (dir.), Dossier Vox, Rencontres internationales de Lure, Lurs-en-Provence, 1975.

== Teacher ==
Baudin had always a desire to communicate his vision on typography to anyone who would be interested to learn more about it. Until the end of his career he was asked numerous times to give classes, lectures or contribute to papers. “Fernand gives the impression of being a cheerful fellow. He is agile and presents himself as a fluent talker. And while he talks it never takes him long to get on typography and the importance of type. Typography earns him his living, but that is not the end of the matter for him. He talks about typography because he loves it with every fibre of his being. This is what makes him happy: he belongs to the enviable minority of people who can say that their hobby has become their work and their work their hobby”.

In 1986 he was asked to speak at a colloquium organised by the University of Namur. His lecture was called: ‘Pour la qualité “typographique” en informatique’. The focus was on the relationship between information provider and consumer.

== Fernand Baudin Prize ==
Three years after his death, the Prize for the Most Beautiful Books in Brussels and Wallonia was named after him, called the Fernand Baudin Prize. Unfortunately the prize does no longer exist. In the years when it was still active, books of any category could be submitted. Then an international jury would make a selection. They question what “a most beautiful book” is and discuss not only the concept of the book but also the realisation used such as printing and binding methods. The prize wanted to support and encourage contemporary bookmaking in Brussels and Wallonia. By doing that they highlighted graphic design as a creative industry and got more public awareness.
