= Berteaux =

Notable people with the surname include:

- Bryan Berteaux (194–2020), African-American news photographer
- Henri Maurice Berteaux, French politician
- Hippolyte Berteaux, French painter

== See also ==
- Bertot, Bertaud, Berteau, Berteaux, Bertaux, Barto
