= Jean Bertaud =

French politician (1898–1987)

Jean Bertaud (9 September 1898 – 8 March 1987) was a French politician.

Bertaud was born in Nîmes. He served as mayor of Saint-Mandé from 1944 to 1983, when he was replaced by Robert-André Vivien. Bertaud was a member of the France between 1948 and 1977. While affiliated with the Union for the New Republic, he held several senior positions within the senatorial UNR group. Bertaud was also active in a succeeding political party, the Rally for the Republic. As a senator, Bertaud represented Seine-et-Oise until the department's dissolution, and afterwards held the Val-de-Marne seat.
