= Henri Roland Lancelot Turpin de Crissé =

French painter

Henri-Roland-Lancelot, marquis Turpin de Crissé (French: [ɑ̃ʁi ʁɔlɑ̃ lɑ̃səlo]; 19 May 1754 – c. 1800) was a French army officer and amateur painter, most notable for his landscapes and architectural studies. He was born in Paris and married the painter Émilie-Sophie de Montullé.

When the French Revolution broke out he was dismissed from his commission. To try to survive he bought new buildings in 1792 and tried to set up a factory to produce English-style faience. However, in 1793 he was forced to sell this and all his property to fund his escape to Britain. He then sailed from there to the US in 1794 and died completely bankrupt in Philadelphia around 1800.

== Paintings ==
- View of the Villa Madame near Rome, The Porticoes of Tivoli and View of the Villa Medici, c. 1786, exhibited at the 1787 Paris Salon
- Temple of Sibyl at Tivoli and Triumphal Arch of Janus in Rome, c. 1786, musée des beaux-arts d'Angers
- The Bridge at Warwick Castle, c. 1789–1793, musée des beaux-arts d'Angers
