= Barto =

Barto may refer to:

- Agniya Barto (1906–1981), Russian poet and children's writer
- Barry Barto (born 1950), American soccer player and coach
- Barto Township, Roseau County, Minnesota
- Barto, Pennsylvania
- Andrew Barto (born 1948), professor of computer science
- Tzimon Barto (born 1963), American pianist
- Barto (band), an electropunk and electroclash band from Saint Petersburg, Russia
- Barto and Mann, a comedic dance act from the late 1920s to the early 1940s
- El Barto, an alter ego of Bart Simpson in The Simpsons

== See also ==
- Bertot, Bertaud, Berteau, Berteaux, Bertaux, Barto
