= Daniel Bertaux =

French sociologist

Daniel Bertaux (born 27 February 1939) is a French sociologist. He uses biographies in the study of sociology, and studies social mobility and life histories. He has been active in the International Sociological Association, European Sociological Association and French Sociological Association (as founder and president). He edited Biography and Society (1981), texts presented in the World Congress of Sociology in Uppsala 1978. After the fall of the Soviet Union he collected and analysed life stories in Russia.

The life history method, previously known as part of the Chicago School and Polish Sociology, had largely fallen into disrepute in sociology until Oscar Lewis popularized the use of life stories in his Children of Sanchez. Inspired by Lewis, Bertaux collected the stories of French family bakers to show how the lives of bakers, bakers' apprentices and their women were interconnected.

He was educated as an engineer. Bertaux has worked with Raymond Aron, Pierre Bourdieu and Alain Touraine. He is married and publishes together with Catherine Delcroix.

== Publications ==
- Destins personnels et structure de classe (Individual destinies and class structure), Presses Universitaires de France, Paris, 1977
- La mobilité sociale (Social mobility), Hatier, coll. « Profil société », Paris, 1985
- (ed, with Paul Thompson): Pathways To Social Class. A Qualitative Approach To Social Mobility. Clarendon Press, Oxford 1997. 323 p.
- (with Isabelle Bertaux-Wiame): Une enquête sur la boulangerie artisanale en France Vol 1 (A study on artisanal bakery in France Vol I) (Vol 2).
  CORDES, 1980, offset, 2 vol.: vol 1, 401 p.; vol. 2, 124 p.
- (with Isabelle Bertaux-Wiame): "Artisanal Bakery in France. How It Lives and Why It Survives", pp. 155–81 in Frank Bechhofer and Brian Elliott (Eds), The Petite Bourgeoisie. Comparative Studies of the Uneasy Stratum, London, MacMillan, 1981
- (with Isabelle Bertaux-Wiame): "Life Stories in the Baker's trade", pp. 169–189 in D. Bertaux (Ed): Biography and Society, London and Beverly Hills: Sage Publications, Londres, 1981; 2nd ed., California Press 1983
- "The Life-Cycle Approach as a Challenge to the Social Sciences", pp. 125–150 in Tamara K. Hareven and Kate J. Adams (Eds): Aging and Life Course Transitions. An Interdisciplinary Perspective. New York, The Guilford Press, 1982.
- "Stories as Clues to Sociological Understanding", pp. 93–108 in Paul Thompson (Ed): Our Common History: The Transformation of Europe, Pluto Press, London 1982
- Histoires de vies - ou récits de pratiques ? Méthodologie de l'approche biographique en sociologie (Life stories - Methodology of the biographical approach in sociology). CORDES, 1976, ronéo, 235 p., bibl.
- (ed) Biography And Society. The Life-History Approach In The Social Sciences, Sage, London and Beverly Hills, 1981, 309 p.
- (with Catherine Delcroix) Des pères face au divorce : la fragilisation du lien paternel (Fathers in divorce: the weakening of the paternal relationship), CNAF, coll. « Espaces et Familles », Paris, 1991
- (ed with Paul Thompson: Between Generations. Family Models, Myths And Memories. Oxford University Press, Oxford 1993; 210 p.
- (with Victoria Semyonova and Yekaterina Foteyeva (in Russian): Sudby lyudei: Russia XX Vek (Russian destinies in the 20th century), Moscow, 1996
- Les récits de vie. Perspective ethnosociologique (Life stories, an ethnosociological perspective), Nathan, coll. « 128 », Paris, 1997
- (with Véronique Garros): Lioudmilla. Une Russe dans le siècle (Lyudmila, a Russian of the century), La Dispute, coll. « Instants », Paris, 1998
- (ed, with Paul Thompson and Anna Rotkirch): On Living in Soviet Russia. Routledge, London 2004. 277 p.
