= John Carlo Bertot =

American information scientist (1964-)

John Carlo Bertot was appointed dean of the College of Information on July 1, 2026. Formerly, he was a professor and co-director of the Information Policy & Access Center at the College of Information at the University of Maryland, where he was also Associate Provost for Faculty Affairs.

== Education ==
Bertot received his Ph.D. from the School of Information Studies at Syracuse University.

== Career ==
Bertot served as an associate professor at the College of Information and as the director of the Information Institute at Florida State University (FSU) from 2001 to 2008. Before joining FSU, Bertot served on the faculty at the State University of New York at Albany.

According to the University of Maryland, Bertot served as editor of Government Information Quarterly from 2000 to 2015, and as co-editor/editor of The Library Quarterly from 2002 to 2014. He joined the University of Maryland's iSchool faculty in August 2008, and before being named Associate Provost in 2015, he was the director of the iSchool's MLS program from 2011- 2015. His research includes e-government, information and telecommunications policy, government agency technology planning and evaluation, and library planning and evaluation. He has been conducting research concerning the Internet and public libraries since 1994. In addition, Bertot also serves as co-editor of the journal Advances in Librarianship.

Bertot has received funding for his research from multiple organizations, including: the National Science Foundation, the Bill & Melinda Gates Foundation, the Government Accountability Office, the American Library Association, and the U.S. Institute of Museum and Library Services.

Bertot also spoke out in favor of the recent extensive renovations to the Enoch Pratt Free Library in Baltimore, Maryland led by former CEO and current Librarian of Congress, Carla Hayden, stating that the shift to the digital age was a shift in focus towards the surrounding community. "You should be able to walk into the Pratt after the renovation and recognize its bones, but also say, 'Wow, this is a great space that allows me to do everything I have to do.' "

In July 2026, John Bertot was appointed dean of the College of Information. Bertot, a professor, researcher, who first joined the college in 2008, returned to the institution after nearly two decades of service at the University of Maryland. His stated vision for the institution emphasizes people, impact, and service.
