= Marie Rosalie Bertaud =

French engraver (1738 – early 19th century)

Marie Rosalie Bertaud after Claude-Joseph Vernet, Impetuous Storm [Orage impétueux], c. 1770, engraving

Marie Rosalie Bertaud (born 1738 – died early 19th century) also referred to as Mme Rosalie Bertaud, Me Re Bertaud, or Rosalie Bertrand, was a French engraver.

== Life and work ==
Marie Rosalie Bertaud was an engraver born in Paris, France in 1738. She studied under Pierre Philippe Choffard and Augustin de Saint-Aubin, both well-known French engravers. Bertaud was skilled and left her mark as a distinguished engraver at a time when female engravers were in a minority.

In her lifetime, she produced numerous engravings after Claude-Joseph Vernet’s seascapes, often as pendant pairs. She has been referred to as a loyal follower of his work. Bertaud was known to take liberties in reproducing Vernet’s compositions, which is particularly evident in her figural arrangements, scale, and cropping. She typically engraved the composition on the plate in reverse, so when it was printed the engraving and painting had the same orientation. Her engraving of The Dangers of the Sea [Les dangers de la mer] is a notable exception as a mirror image of the original painting.

Her prints were often publicized in the Gazette de France and the Mercure. In a January 1, 1770 announcement regarding Impetuous Storm [Orage impétueux], her name was mistakenly printed as ‘Bertrand.’ At this point, Bertrand and Bertaud became recognizable as one and the same. The announcements were inconsistent, but generally provided a brief description of the print, the price and where it was available for purchase in Paris. Announcements were made for the following works between 1770 and 1772, usually printed first in the Gazette and in the Mercure later in the month or the following month: Impetuous Storm [Orage impétueux], The Boat Set Afloat [La barque mise à flot], The Italian Fishermen [Les pècheurs italiens], Fishing in the Moon Light [La peche au clair de la lune], and The Pierced Rock [Le rocher percé].

Her engravings have been collected by Harvard Art Museums, Bowdoin College Museum of Art, Reading Public Museum, the Philadelphia Museum of Art, and the Metropolitan Museum of Art. At one time The Dangers of the Sea [Les dangers de la mer] was in the collection of Louis Roederer, a French patron of the arts and proprietor of the eponymous champagne house. It is unclear where the print is today.

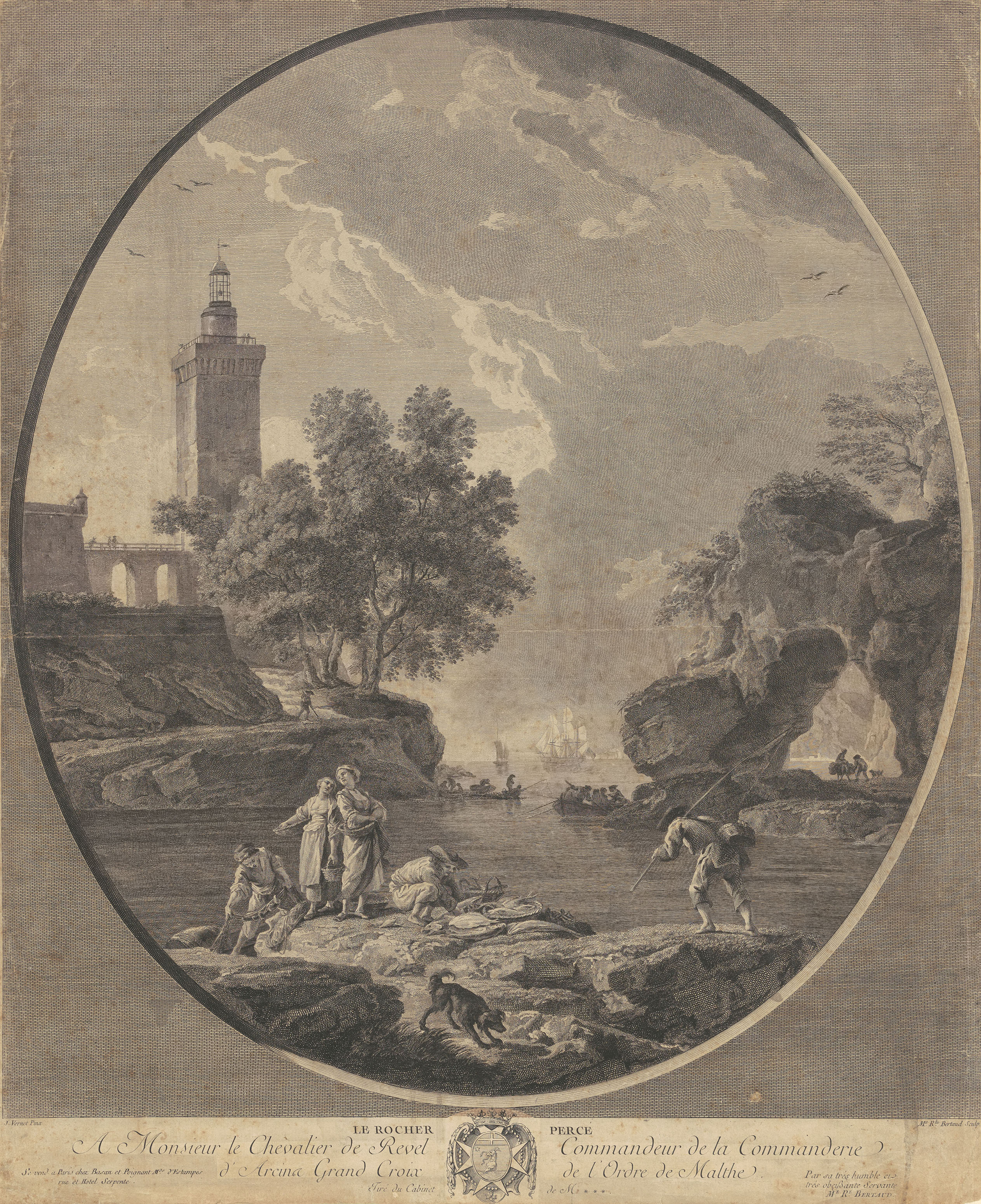
Marie Rosalie Bertaud after Claude-Joseph Vernet, The Pierced Rock [Le rocher percé], before 1800, engraving and etching

There is no documentation detailing the end of Bertaud's career or her exact death date, only that she died in the early 19th century.

== Engravings after Claude-Joseph Vernet ==
- Impetuous Storm [Orage impétueux], c. 1770
- Anglers [Les pècheurs à la ligne], c. 1770
- The Pierced Rock [Le rocher percé], before 1800 (pendant to The Boat Set Afloat [La barque mise à flot])
- The Boat Set Afloat [La barque mise à flot], 1770 (pendant to The Pierced Rock [Le rocher percé])
- Fishing in the Moon Light [La peche au clair de la lune], c. 1771
- The Italian Fishermen [Les pècheurs italiens], c. 1770
- Effect of Thunder [Effet du tonnerre], c. 1755–85
- The Dangers of the Sea [Les dangers de la mer], c. 1773

== Gallery ==
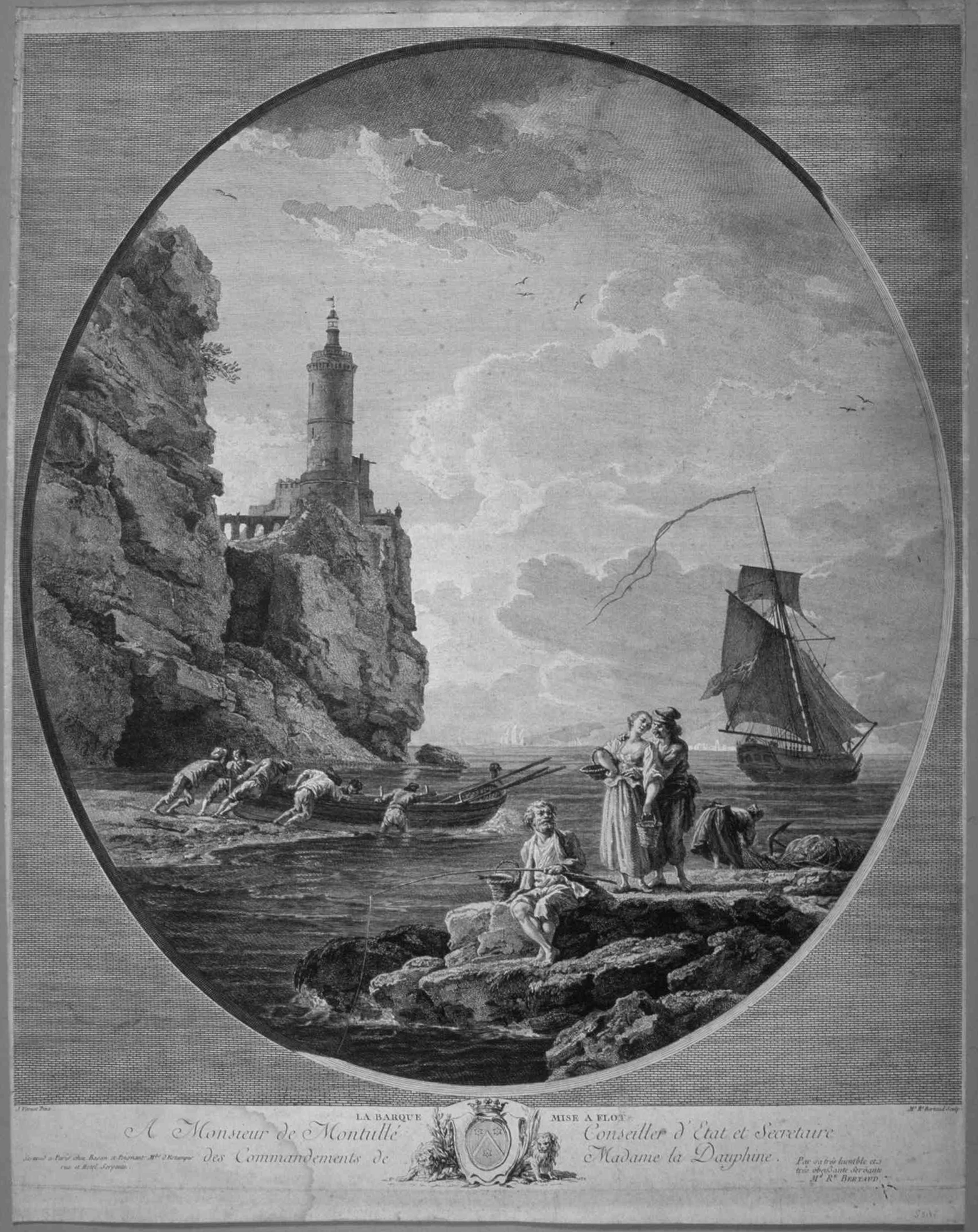
Marie Rosalie Bertaud after Claude-Joseph Vernet, The Boat Set Afloat [La barque mise à flot], 1770, engraving

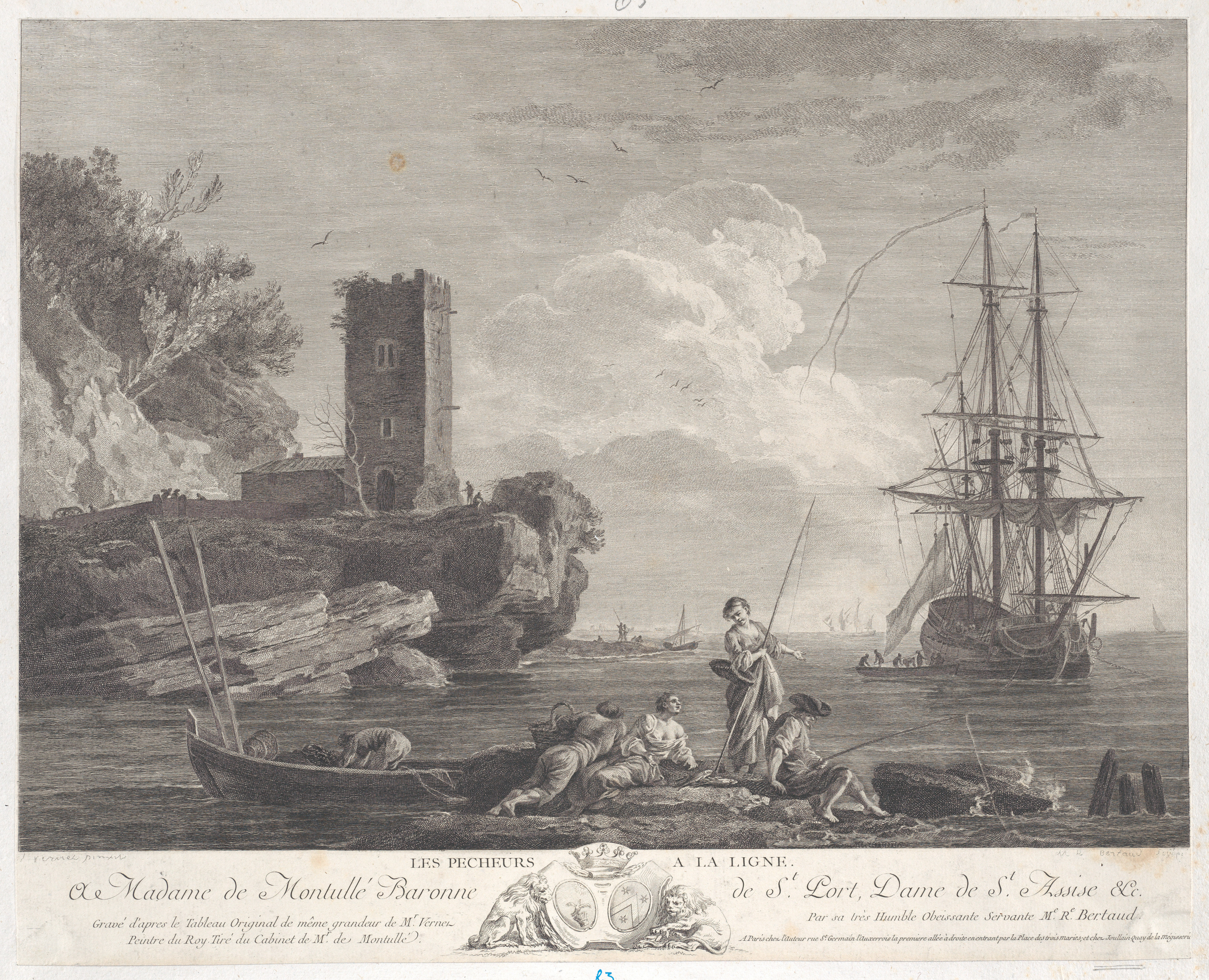
Marie Rosalie Bertaud after Claude-Joseph Vernet, Anglers, [Les pecheurs a la ligne], c. 1770, engraving

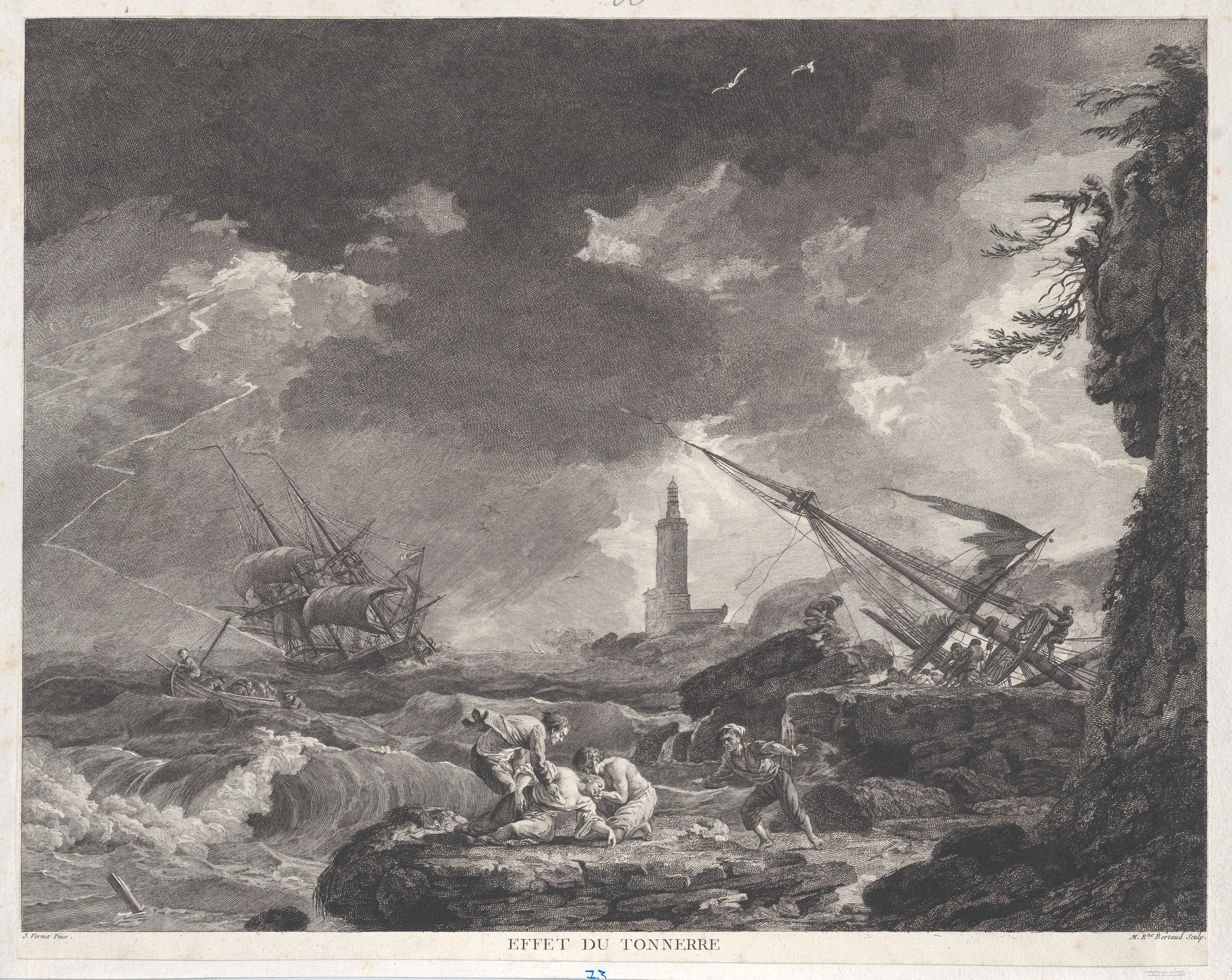
Marie Rosalie Bertaud after Claude-Joseph Vernet, Effect of Thunder [Effet du tonnerre], c. 1755–85, engraving

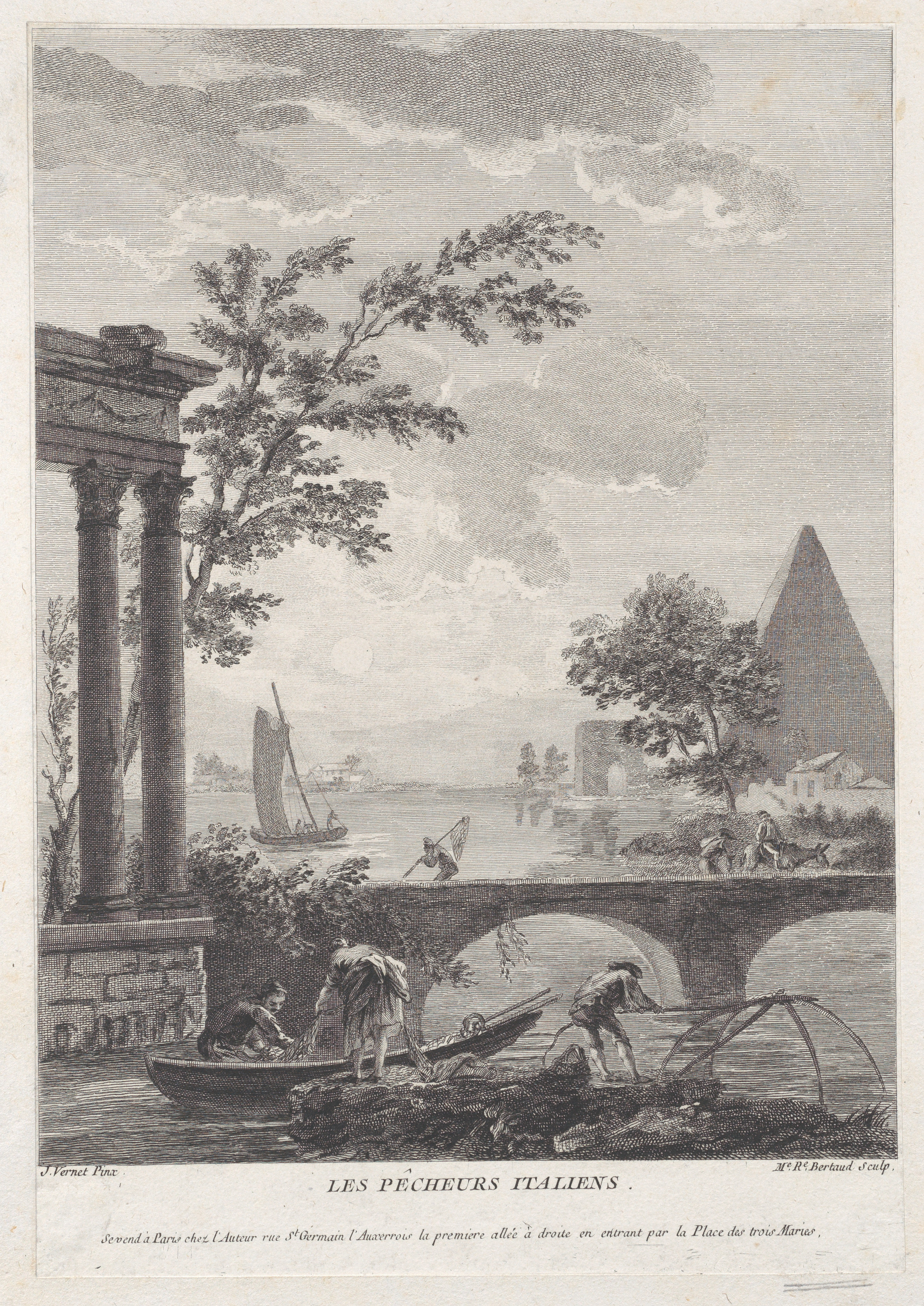
Marie Rosalie Bertaud after Claude-Joseph Vernet, The Italian Fisherman [Les pêcheurs italiens], c. 1770, engraving

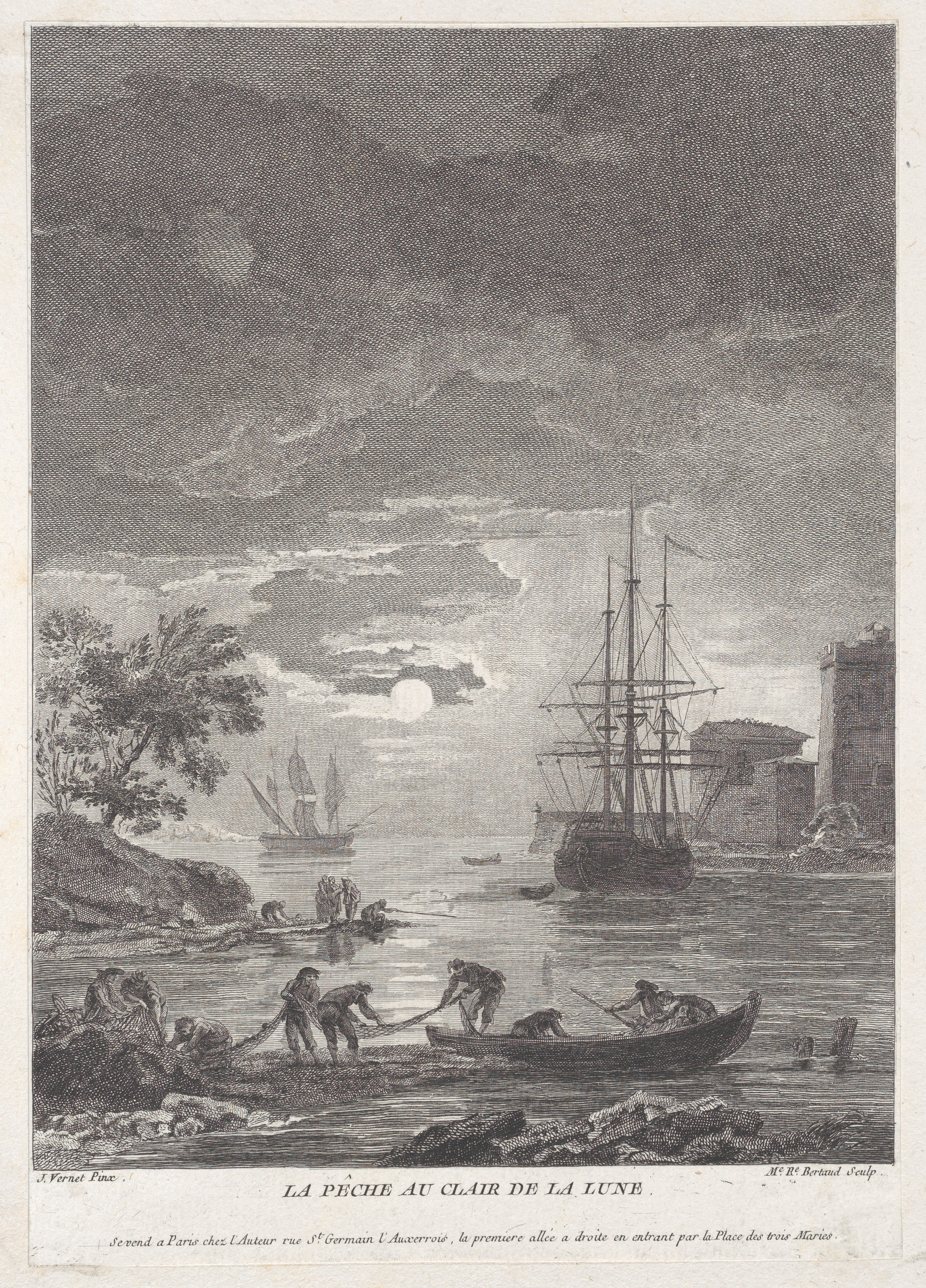
Marie Rosalie Bertaud after Claude-Joseph Vernet, Fishing in the Moon Light [La pêche au clair de la lune], c. 1771, engraving
